= Rimbez-et-Baudiets =

- Commune
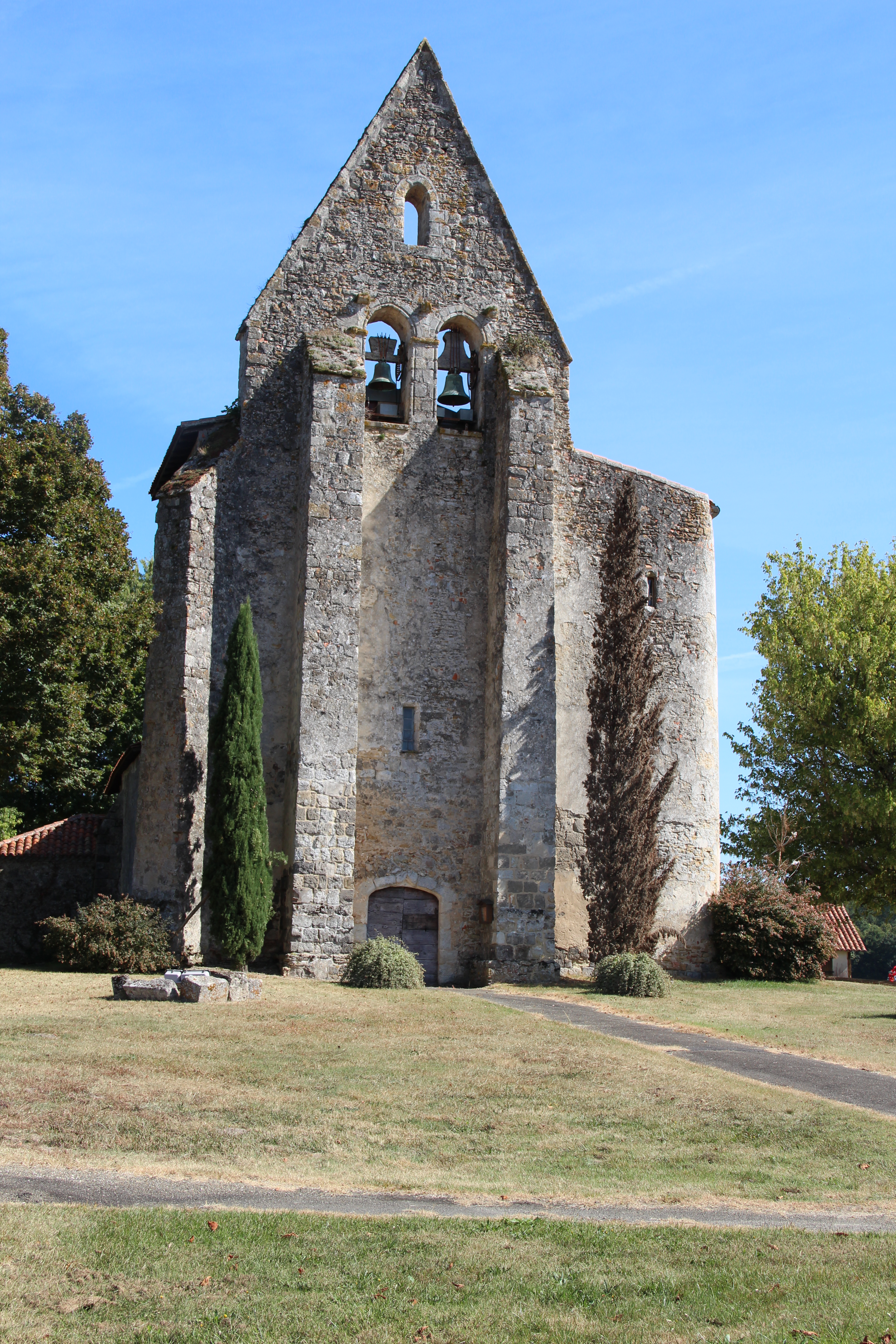
- Location of Rimbez-et-Baudiets
- Location within France Location within Nouvelle-Aquitaine
- Coordinates: 44°03′10″N 0°03′12″E
- Country: France
- Region: Nouvelle-Aquitaine
- Department: Landes
- Arrondissement: Mont-de-Marsan
- Canton: Haute Lande Armagnac

Government
  - Mayor (2020–2026): Nicolas Lafon
- Area^{1}: 32.84 km^{2} (12.68 sq mi)
- Elevation: 148 m (486 ft)
- Highest elevation: 154 m (505 ft)
- Lowest elevation: 88 m (289 ft)
- Population (2023): 104
  - Density: 3.17/km^{2} (8.20/sq mi)
- Time zone: UTC+01:00 (CET)
  - Summer (DST): UTC+02:00 (CEST)
- INSEE/Postal code: 40242 /40310
- ^{1} French Land Register data, which excludes lakes, ponds, glaciers > 1 km^{2} (0.386 sq mi or 247 acres) and river estuaries.

Rimbez-et-Baudiets is a commune in the Landes department in Nouvelle-Aquitaine in southwestern France.

== Population ==
Historical population
Year	Pop.	±% p.a.
1968	97	—
1975	83	−2.20%
1982	60	−4.53%
1990	79	+3.50%
1999	86	+0.95%
2007	93	+0.98%
2012	101	+1.66%
2017	105	+0.78%
2023	104	−0.16%
Source: INSEE

== Geography ==
=== Location ===
The municipality is located in the Landes forest on the Rimbez. It borders the administrative division of Lot-et-Garonne.

=== Neighboring municipalities ===
The neighboring municipalities are Arx, Baudignan, Escalans, Herré, Losse, Lubbon, and Sos.

== See also ==
- Communes of the Landes department
