= Centre d'expertise aérienne militaire =

French aeronautical research and test centre

CEAM
- Mont-de-Marsan Air Base, Aquitaine

Site information
- Type: Research establishment
- Owner: Direction Générale de l'Armement (1933–)
- Controlled by: France French Air and Space Force

Location
- Position in Aquitaine
- Coordinates: 43.92°N 0.50°W

Site history
- Built: 1933 (Reims)
- In use: 1945 - (Mont-de-Marsan)

The Centre d’expertise aérienne militaire, or also widely known as CEAM, is the main French aeronautical research and test centre, in south-west France, towards Spain. It is currently located at Mont-de-Marsan Air Base, Aquitaine.

== History ==
Mont-de-Marsan (Base aérienne 118 Mont-de-Marsan) was the home of France's first nuclear bombers, the Dassault Mirage IV.

CEAM was established as the Centre d'expériences aériennes militaires at Reims in northern France (Grand Est) on 26 April 1933, then moved to Orléans – Bricy Air Base BA 123 (Centre-Val de Loire) in 1939, and Mont-de-Marsan in 1945. CEAM is translated as the Military Air Experiment Centre.

CEAM changed its name to Centre d’expertise aérienne militaire on 1 September 2015.

== Structure ==
It is situated at Mont-de-Marsan Air Base (ICAO: LFBM), directly to the north of Mont-de-Marsan, in Landes, Aquitaine. It is accessed via the D53 road (for Canenx-et-Réaut), off the D834. The north–south A65 autoroute is a few miles to the east.

== See also ==
- CEA Cesta, where the French design their nuclear weapons
- French air defence radar systems
