= Saint-Gor =

- Commune
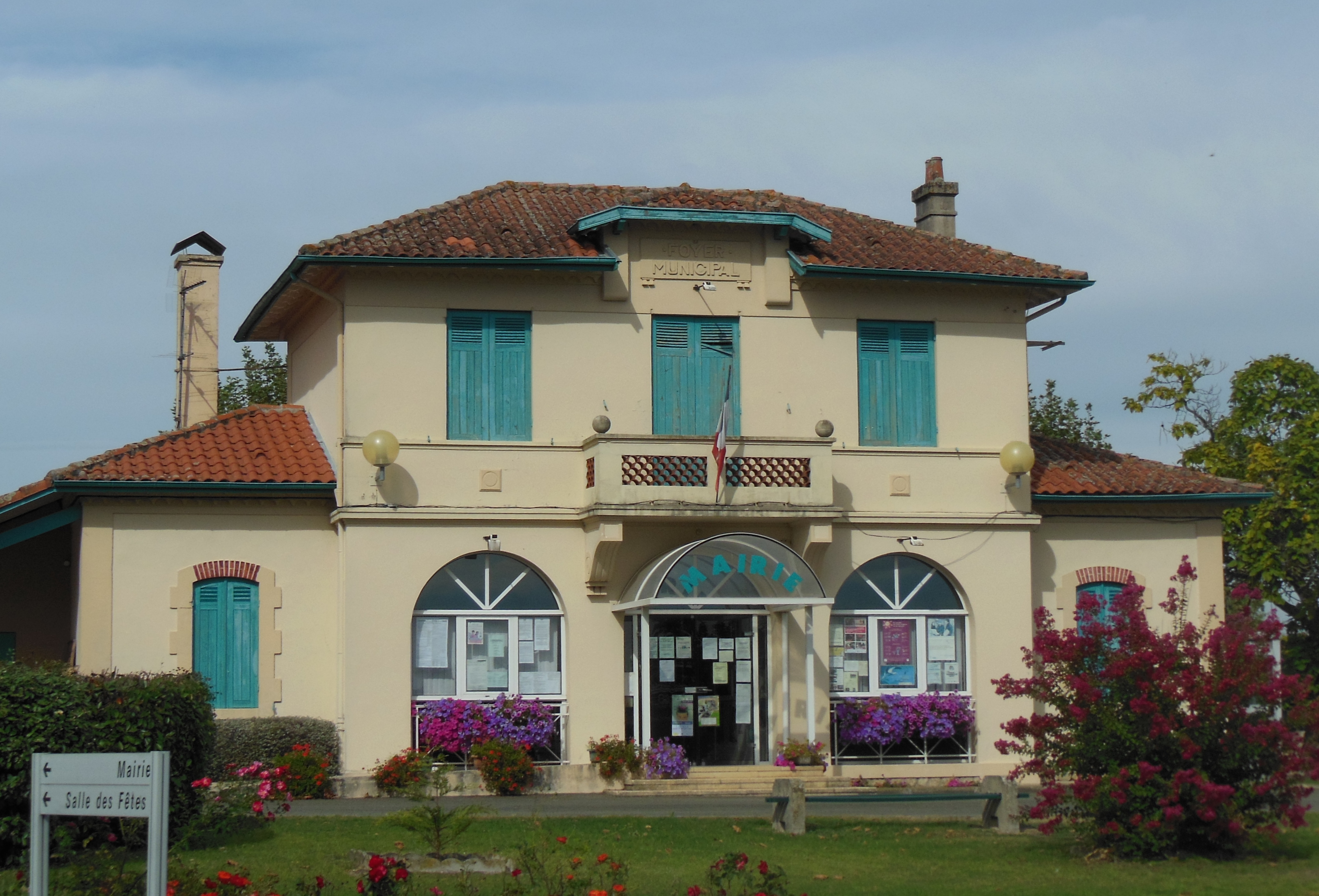
- Town hall
- Location of Saint-Gor
- Location within France Location within Nouvelle-Aquitaine
- Coordinates: 44°03′17″N 0°14′23″W
- Country: France
- Region: Nouvelle-Aquitaine
- Department: Landes
- Arrondissement: Mont-de-Marsan
- Canton: Haute Lande Armagnac

Government
  - Mayor (2020–2026): Guillaume Depoumps
- Area^{1}: 53.72 km^{2} (20.74 sq mi)
- Elevation: 120 m (390 ft)
- Highest elevation: 128 m (420 ft)
- Lowest elevation: 65 m (213 ft)
- Population (2023): 308
  - Density: 5.73/km^{2} (14.8/sq mi)
- Time zone: UTC+01:00 (CET)
  - Summer (DST): UTC+02:00 (CEST)
- INSEE/Postal code: 40262 /40120
- ^{1} French Land Register data, which excludes lakes, ponds, glaciers > 1 km^{2} (0.386 sq mi or 247 acres) and river estuaries.

Saint-Gor (French pronunciation: [sɛ̃ ɡɔʁ]; Occitan: Sengòr) is a commune in the Landes department in Nouvelle-Aquitaine in southwestern France.

== Population ==
Historical population
Year	Pop.	±% p.a.
1968	308	—
1975	251	−2.88%
1982	232	−1.12%
1990	241	+0.48%
1999	270	+1.27%
2007	270	+0.00%
2012	323	+3.65%
2017	302	−1.34%
2023	308	+0.33%
Source: INSEE

== See also ==
- Communes of the Landes department
