= Escource =

- Commune
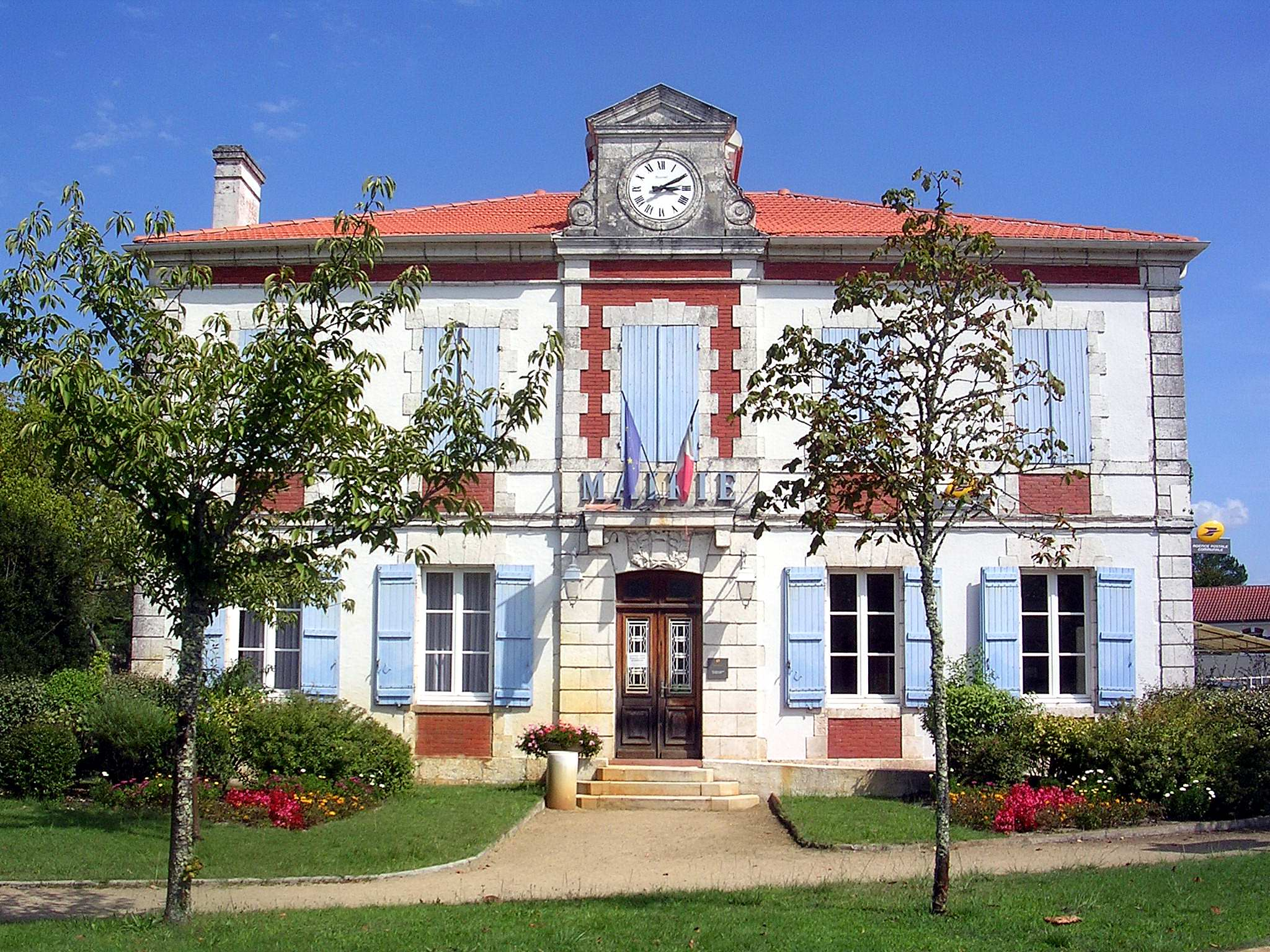
- Town hall
- Location of Escource
- Location within France Location within Nouvelle-Aquitaine
- Coordinates: 44°09′55″N 1°01′55″W
- Country: France
- Region: Nouvelle-Aquitaine
- Department: Landes
- Arrondissement: Mont-de-Marsan
- Canton: Haute Lande Armagnac

Government
  - Mayor (2024–2026): Pierre Lasterra
- Area^{1}: 102.74 km^{2} (39.67 sq mi)
- Elevation: 75 m (246 ft)
- Highest elevation: 84 m (276 ft)
- Lowest elevation: 23 m (75 ft)
- Population (2023): 824
  - Density: 8.02/km^{2} (20.8/sq mi)
- Time zone: UTC+01:00 (CET)
  - Summer (DST): UTC+02:00 (CEST)
- INSEE/Postal code: 40094 /40210
- ^{1} French Land Register data, which excludes lakes, ponds, glaciers > 1 km^{2} (0.386 sq mi or 247 acres) and river estuaries.

Escource (French pronunciation: [ɛskuʁs]; Occitan: Escorce) is a commune in the Landes department in Nouvelle-Aquitaine in southwestern France.

== Population ==
Historical population
Year	Pop.	±% p.a.
1968	585	—
1975	522	−1.61%
1982	523	+0.03%
1990	612	+1.98%
1999	606	−0.11%
2007	595	−0.23%
2012	633	+1.25%
2017	721	+2.64%
2023	824	+2.25%
Source: INSEE

== See also ==
- Communes of the Landes department
