= Canton of Haute Lande Armagnac =

Coordinates: 44.11°N 0.54°W

The canton of Haute Lande Armagnac is an administrative division of the Landes department, southwestern France. It was created at the French canton reorganisation which came into effect in March 2015. Its seat is in Labrit.

It consists of the following communes:

1. Argelouse
2. Arue
3. Arx
4. Baudignan
5. Bélis
6. Betbezer-d'Armagnac
7. Bourriot-Bergonce
8. Brocas
9. Cachen
10. Callen
11. Canenx-et-Réaut
12. Cère
13. Commensacq
14. Créon-d'Armagnac
15. Escalans
16. Escource
17. Estigarde
18. Gabarret
19. Garein
20. Herré
21. Labastide-d'Armagnac
22. Labouheyre
23. Labrit
24. Lagrange
25. Lencouacq
26. Losse
27. Lubbon
28. Luglon
29. Luxey
30. Maillas
31. Maillères
32. Mauvezin-d'Armagnac
33. Parleboscq
34. Retjons
35. Rimbez-et-Baudiets
36. Roquefort
37. Sabres
38. Saint-Gor
39. Saint-Julien-d'Armagnac
40. Saint-Justin
41. Sarbazan
42. Le Sen
43. Solférino
44. Sore
45. Trensacq
46. Vert
47. Vielle-Soubiran
