= Maillères =

- Commune
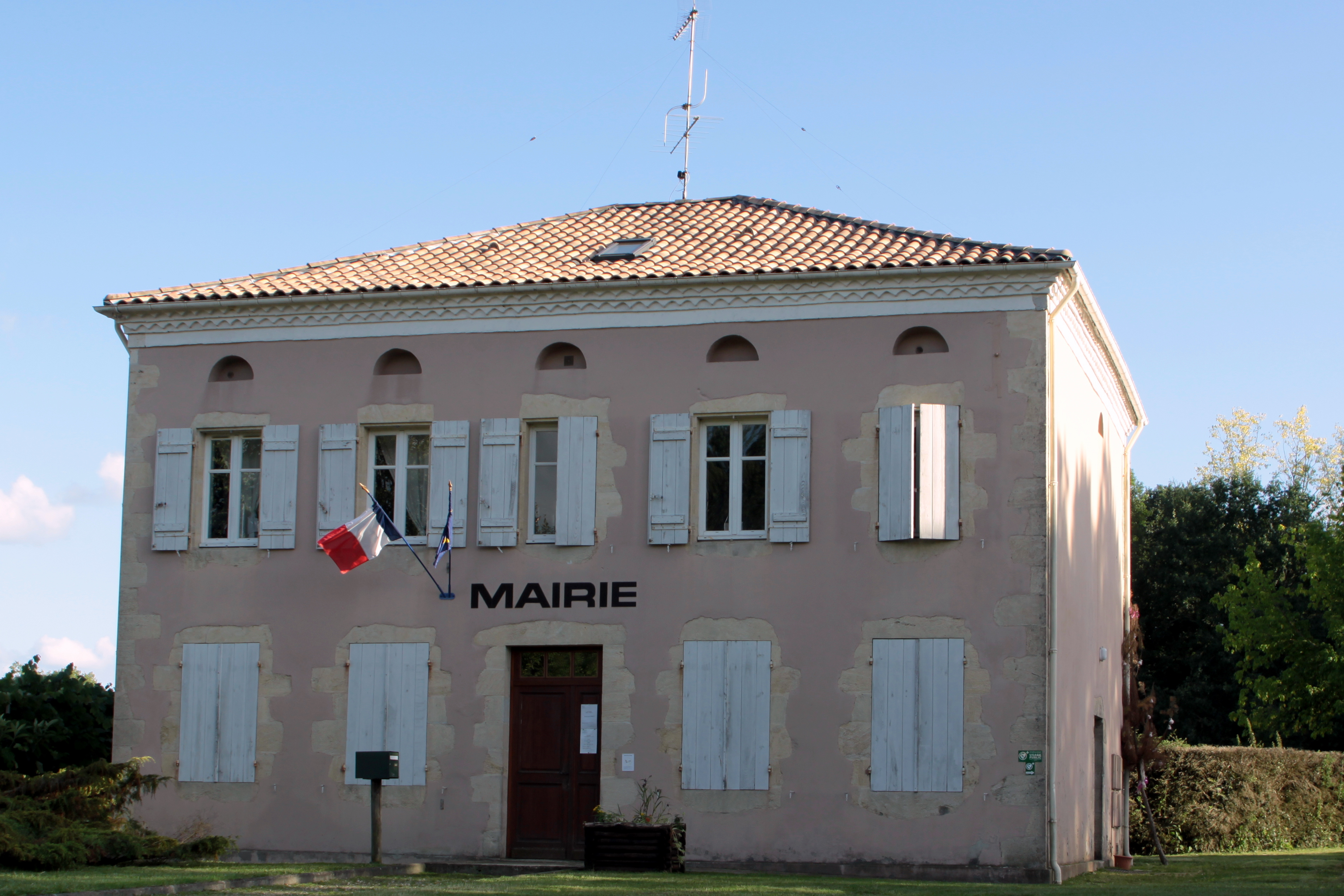
- The town hall in Maillères
- Location of Maillères
- Location within France Location within Nouvelle-Aquitaine
- Coordinates: 44°01′45″N 0°26′34″W
- Country: France
- Region: Nouvelle-Aquitaine
- Department: Landes
- Arrondissement: Mont-de-Marsan
- Canton: Haute Lande Armagnac
- Intercommunality: Cœur Haute Lande

Government
  - Mayor (2020–2026): Jeanne Coutière
- Area^{1}: 15.05 km^{2} (5.81 sq mi)
- Elevation: 91 m (299 ft)
- Highest elevation: 118 m (387 ft)
- Lowest elevation: 44 m (144 ft)
- Population (2023): 230
  - Density: 15/km^{2} (40/sq mi)
- Time zone: UTC+01:00 (CET)
  - Summer (DST): UTC+02:00 (CEST)
- INSEE/Postal code: 40170 /40120
- ^{1} French Land Register data, which excludes lakes, ponds, glaciers > 1 km^{2} (0.386 sq mi or 247 acres) and river estuaries.

Maillères (French pronunciation: [majɛʁ]; Occitan: Malhèras) is a commune in the Landes department in Nouvelle-Aquitaine in south-western France.

== See also ==
- Communes of the Landes department
