= Solférino =

- Commune
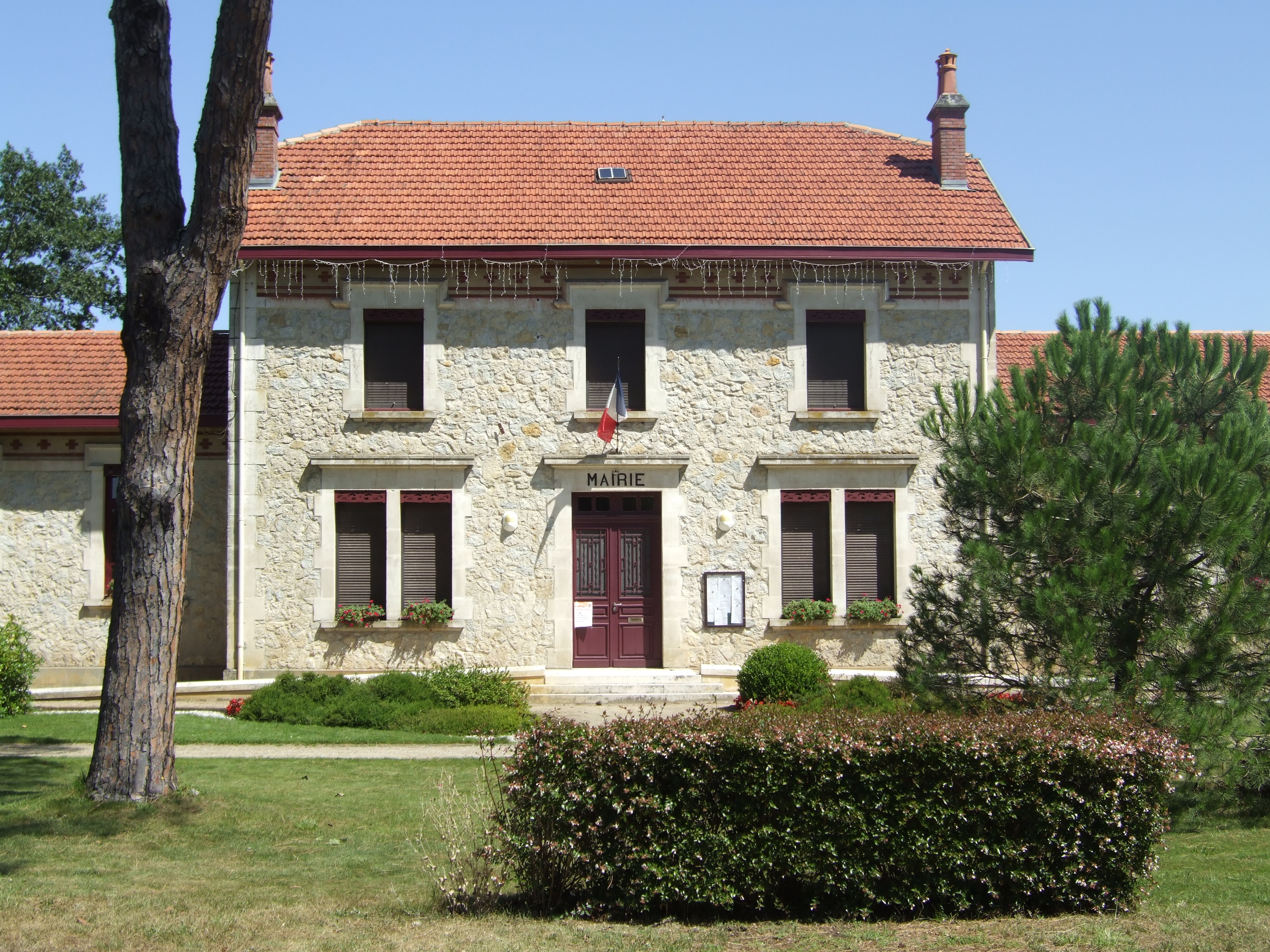
- Town hall
- Location of Solférino
- Location within France Location within Nouvelle-Aquitaine
- Coordinates: 44°08′47″N 0°54′57″W
- Country: France
- Region: Nouvelle-Aquitaine
- Department: Landes
- Arrondissement: Mont-de-Marsan
- Canton: Haute Lande Armagnac

Government
  - Mayor (2020–2026): Raymonde Piedanna
- Area^{1}: 97.83 km^{2} (37.77 sq mi)
- Elevation: 83 m (272 ft)
- Highest elevation: 85 m (279 ft)
- Lowest elevation: 74 m (243 ft)
- Population (2023): 374
  - Density: 3.82/km^{2} (9.90/sq mi)
- Time zone: UTC+01:00 (CET)
  - Summer (DST): UTC+02:00 (CEST)
- INSEE/Postal code: 40303 /40210
- ^{1} French Land Register data, which excludes lakes, ponds, glaciers > 1 km^{2} (0.386 sq mi or 247 acres) and river estuaries.

Solférino (French pronunciation: [sɔlfeʁino]; Occitan: Solferino) is a commune in the Landes department in Nouvelle-Aquitaine in southwestern France.

It was created in 1863 by Napoléon III by uniting several neighboring communities. It is named after the Battle of Solferino.

== Population ==
Historical population
Year	Pop.	±% p.a.
1968	447	—
1975	486	+1.20%
1982	414	−2.26%
1990	403	−0.34%
1999	348	−1.62%
2007	350	+0.07%
2012	341	−0.52%
2017	324	−1.02%
2023	374	+2.42%
Source: INSEE

== See also ==
- Communes of the Landes department
- Parc naturel régional des Landes de Gascogne
