= Commensacq =

- Commune
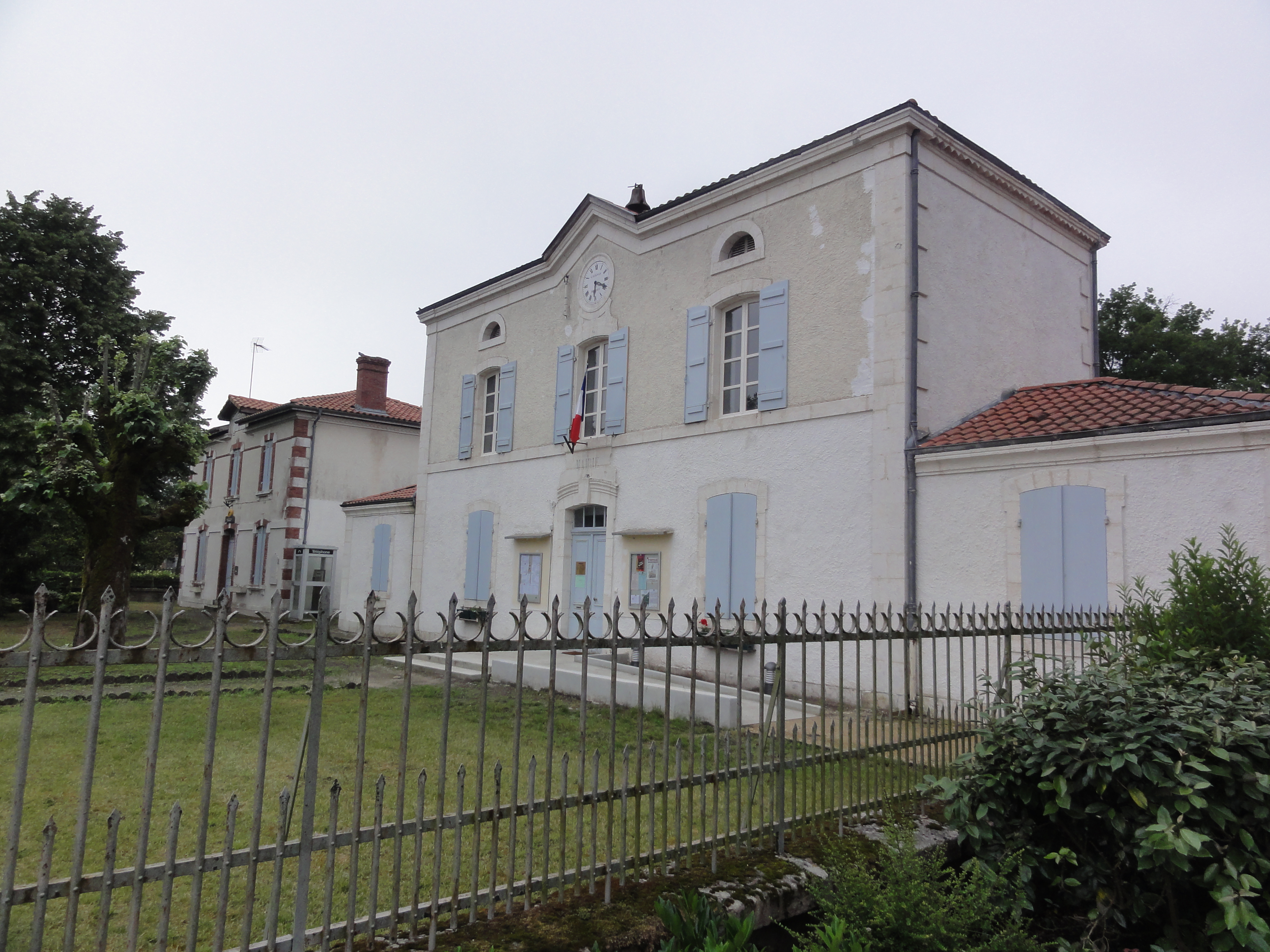
- Town hall
- Location of Commensacq
- Location within France Location within Nouvelle-Aquitaine
- Coordinates: 44°12′42″N 0°49′27″W
- Country: France
- Region: Nouvelle-Aquitaine
- Department: Landes
- Arrondissement: Mont-de-Marsan
- Canton: Haute Lande Armagnac
- Intercommunality: Cœur Haute Lande

Government
  - Mayor (2020–2026): Richard Cabanac
- Area^{1}: 71.24 km^{2} (27.51 sq mi)
- Elevation: 75 m (246 ft)
- Highest elevation: 84 m (276 ft)
- Lowest elevation: 49 m (161 ft)
- Population (2023): 440
  - Density: 6.2/km^{2} (16/sq mi)
- Time zone: UTC+01:00 (CET)
  - Summer (DST): UTC+02:00 (CEST)
- INSEE/Postal code: 40085 /40210
- ^{1} French Land Register data, which excludes lakes, ponds, glaciers > 1 km^{2} (0.386 sq mi or 247 acres) and river estuaries.

Commensacq (French pronunciation: [kɔmɛ̃sak]; Occitan: Comensac) is a commune in the Landes department in Nouvelle-Aquitaine in southwestern France.

== Population ==
Historical population
| Year | Pop. | ±% p.a. |
|---|---|---|
| 1968 | 436 | — |
| 1975 | 332 | −3.82% |
| 1982 | 328 | −0.17% |
| 1990 | 345 | +0.63% |
| 1999 | 320 | −0.83% |
| 2007 | 380 | +2.17% |
| 2012 | 421 | +2.07% |
| 2017 | 432 | +0.52% |
| 2023 | 440 | +0.31% |
Source: INSEE

== See also ==
- Communes of the Landes department
- Parc naturel régional des Landes de Gascogne
