= Le Sen =

- Commune
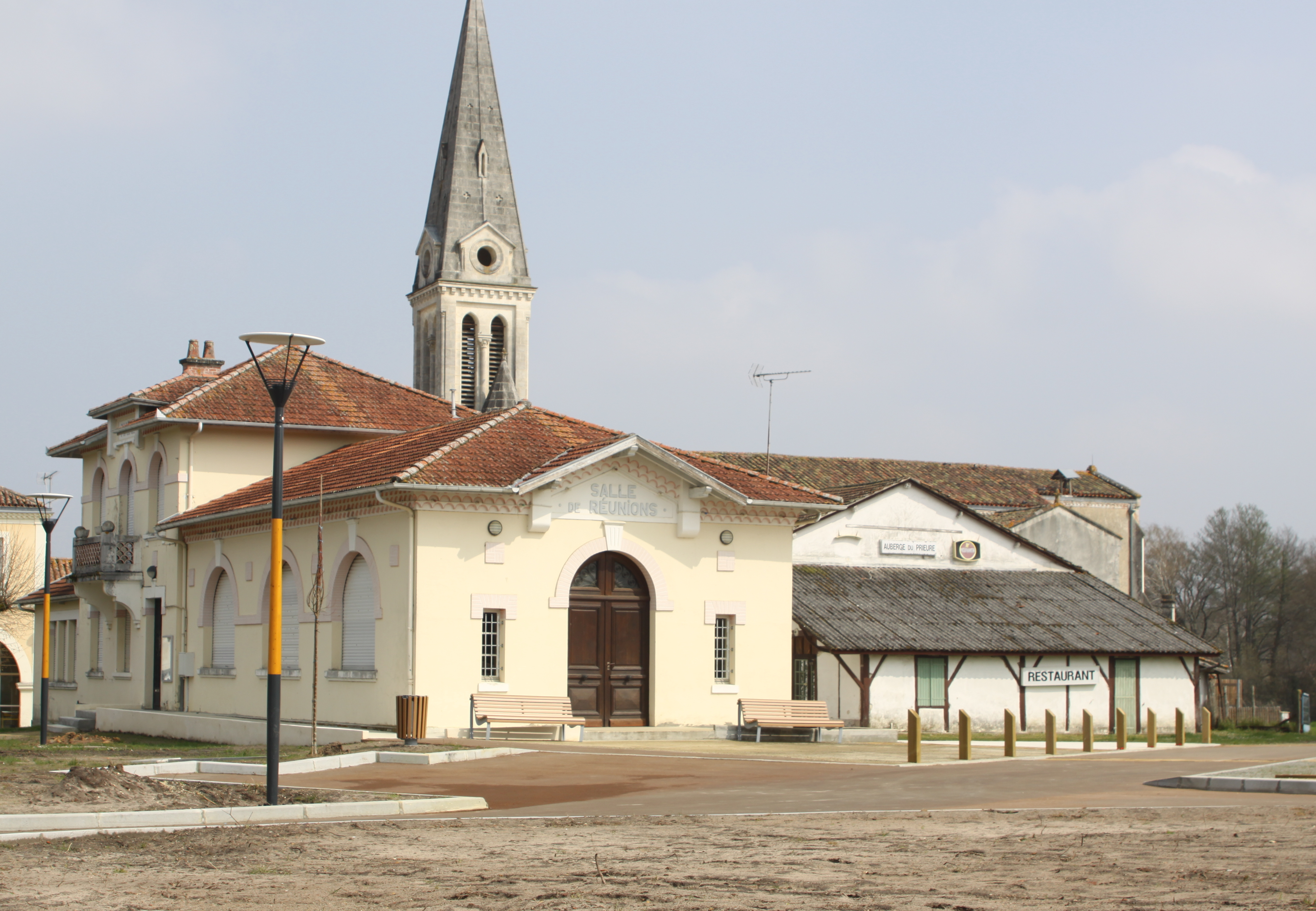
- Location of Le Sen
- Location within France Location within Nouvelle-Aquitaine
- Coordinates: 44°07′39″N 0°29′59″W
- Country: France
- Region: Nouvelle-Aquitaine
- Department: Landes
- Arrondissement: Mont-de-Marsan
- Canton: Haute Lande Armagnac
- Intercommunality: Cœur Haute Lande

Government
  - Mayor (2020–2026): Jean-Pierre Puybaraud
- Area^{1}: 51.1 km^{2} (19.7 sq mi)
- Elevation: 87 m (285 ft)
- Highest elevation: 123 m (404 ft)
- Lowest elevation: 88 m (289 ft)
- Population (2023): 215
  - Density: 4.21/km^{2} (10.9/sq mi)
- Time zone: UTC+01:00 (CET)
  - Summer (DST): UTC+02:00 (CEST)
- INSEE/Postal code: 40297 /40420
- ^{1} French Land Register data, which excludes lakes, ponds, glaciers > 1 km^{2} (0.386 sq mi or 247 acres) and river estuaries.

Le Sen (Occitan: Lo Sen) is a commune in the Landes department in Nouvelle-Aquitaine in southwestern France.

== Population ==
Historical population
| Year | Pop. | ±% p.a. |
|---|---|---|
| 1968 | 182 | — |
| 1975 | 127 | −5.01% |
| 1982 | 127 | +0.00% |
| 1990 | 161 | +3.01% |
| 1999 | 201 | +2.50% |
| 2007 | 205 | +0.25% |
| 2012 | 204 | −0.10% |
| 2017 | 227 | +2.16% |
| 2023 | 215 | −0.90% |
Source: INSEE

== See also ==
- Communes of the Landes department
- Parc naturel régional des Landes de Gascogne
