= Vielle-Soubiran =

- Commune
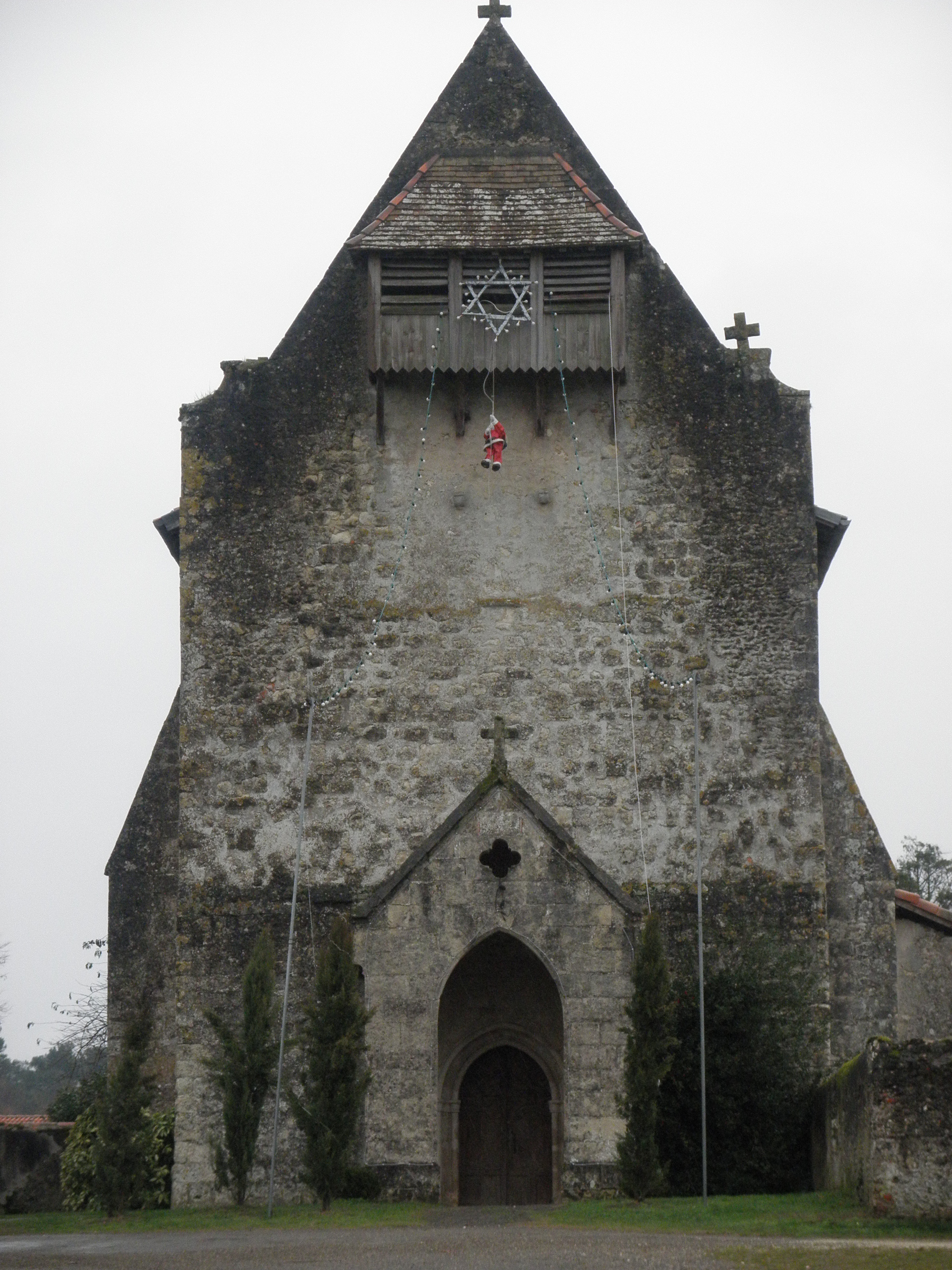
- Location of Vielle-Soubiran
- Location within France Location within Nouvelle-Aquitaine
- Coordinates: 44°02′45″N 0°11′02″W
- Country: France
- Region: Nouvelle-Aquitaine
- Department: Landes
- Arrondissement: Mont-de-Marsan
- Canton: Haute Lande Armagnac

Government
  - Mayor (2020–2026): Sylvie Lauron
- Area^{1}: 32.71 km^{2} (12.63 sq mi)
- Elevation: 120 m (390 ft)
- Highest elevation: 142 m (466 ft)
- Lowest elevation: 92 m (302 ft)
- Population (2023): 226
  - Density: 6.91/km^{2} (17.9/sq mi)
- Time zone: UTC+01:00 (CET)
  - Summer (DST): UTC+02:00 (CEST)
- INSEE/Postal code: 40327 /40240
- ^{1} French Land Register data, which excludes lakes, ponds, glaciers > 1 km^{2} (0.386 sq mi or 247 acres) and river estuaries.

Vielle-Soubiran (French pronunciation: [vjɛl subiʁɑ̃]; Occitan: Vièla Sobiran) is a commune in the Landes department in Nouvelle-Aquitaine in southwestern France.

== Population ==
Historical population
| Year | Pop. | ±% p.a. |
|---|---|---|
| 1968 | 219 | — |
| 1975 | 216 | −0.20% |
| 1982 | 219 | +0.20% |
| 1990 | 208 | −0.64% |
| 1999 | 197 | −0.60% |
| 2007 | 238 | +2.39% |
| 2012 | 247 | +0.75% |
| 2017 | 229 | −1.50% |
| 2023 | 226 | −0.22% |
Source: INSEE

== See also ==
- Communes of the Landes department
