= Parleboscq =

- Commune
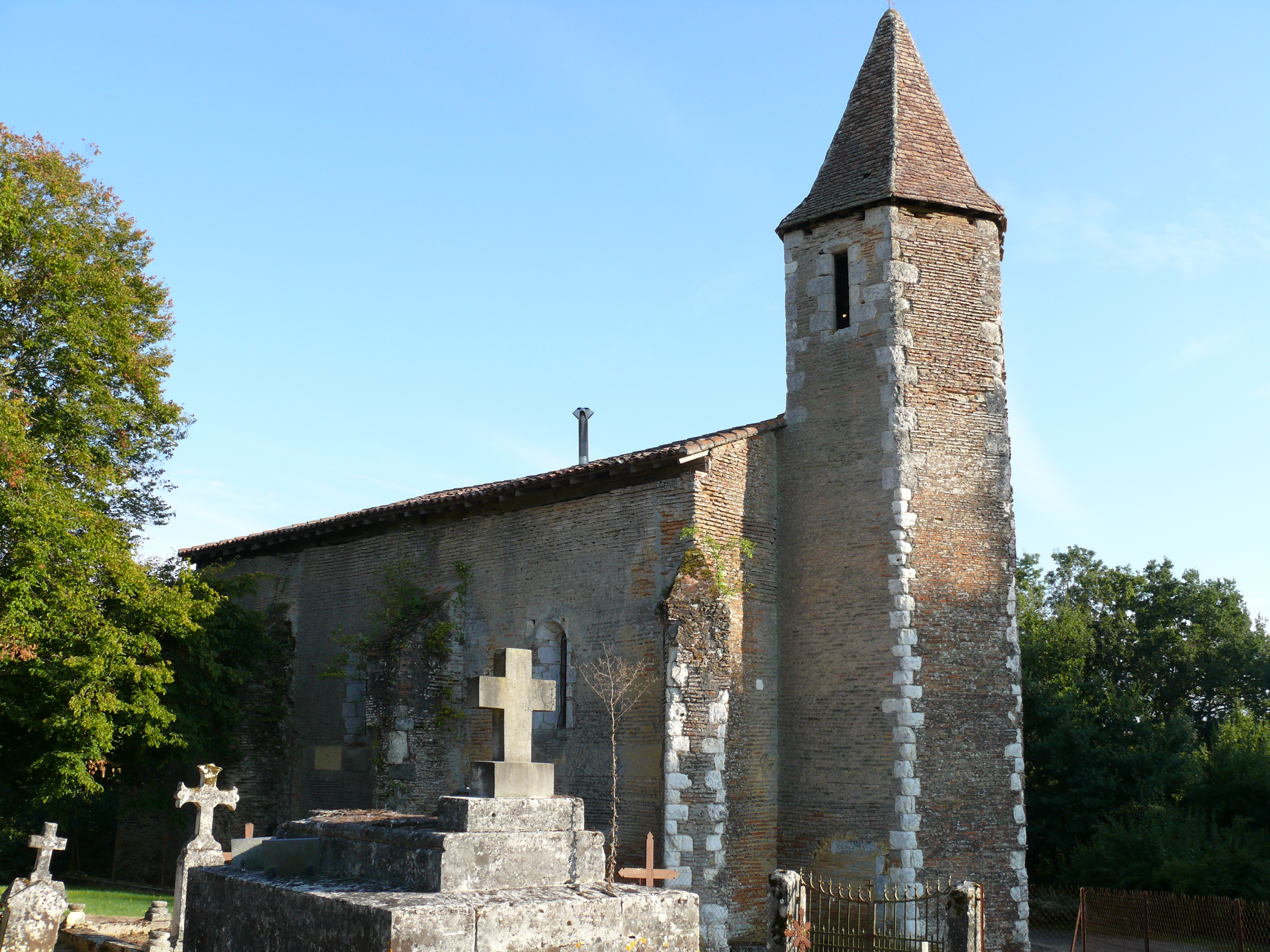
- Location of Parleboscq
- Location within France Location within Nouvelle-Aquitaine
- Coordinates: 43°56′53″N 0°02′16″E
- Country: France
- Region: Nouvelle-Aquitaine
- Department: Landes
- Arrondissement: Mont-de-Marsan
- Canton: Haute Lande Armagnac

Government
  - Mayor (2020–2026): Serge Tintané
- Area^{1}: 40.19 km^{2} (15.52 sq mi)
- Elevation: 141 m (463 ft)
- Highest elevation: 182 m (597 ft)
- Lowest elevation: 87 m (285 ft)
- Population (2023): 451
  - Density: 11.2/km^{2} (29.1/sq mi)
- Time zone: UTC+01:00 (CET)
  - Summer (DST): UTC+02:00 (CEST)
- INSEE/Postal code: 40218 /40310
- ^{1} French Land Register data, which excludes lakes, ponds, glaciers > 1 km^{2} (0.386 sq mi or 247 acres) and river estuaries.

Parleboscq (French pronunciation: [paʁləbɔsk]; Occitan: Parlebòsc) is a commune in the Landes department in Nouvelle-Aquitaine in southwestern France.

== Population ==
Historical population
Year	Pop.	±% p.a.
1968	653	—
1975	554	−2.32%
1982	541	−0.34%
1990	550	+0.21%
1999	504	−0.97%
2007	512	+0.20%
2012	511	−0.04%
2017	506	−0.20%
2023	451	−1.90%
Source: INSEE

== See also ==
- Communes of the Landes department
