= Mauvezin-d'Armagnac =

- Commune
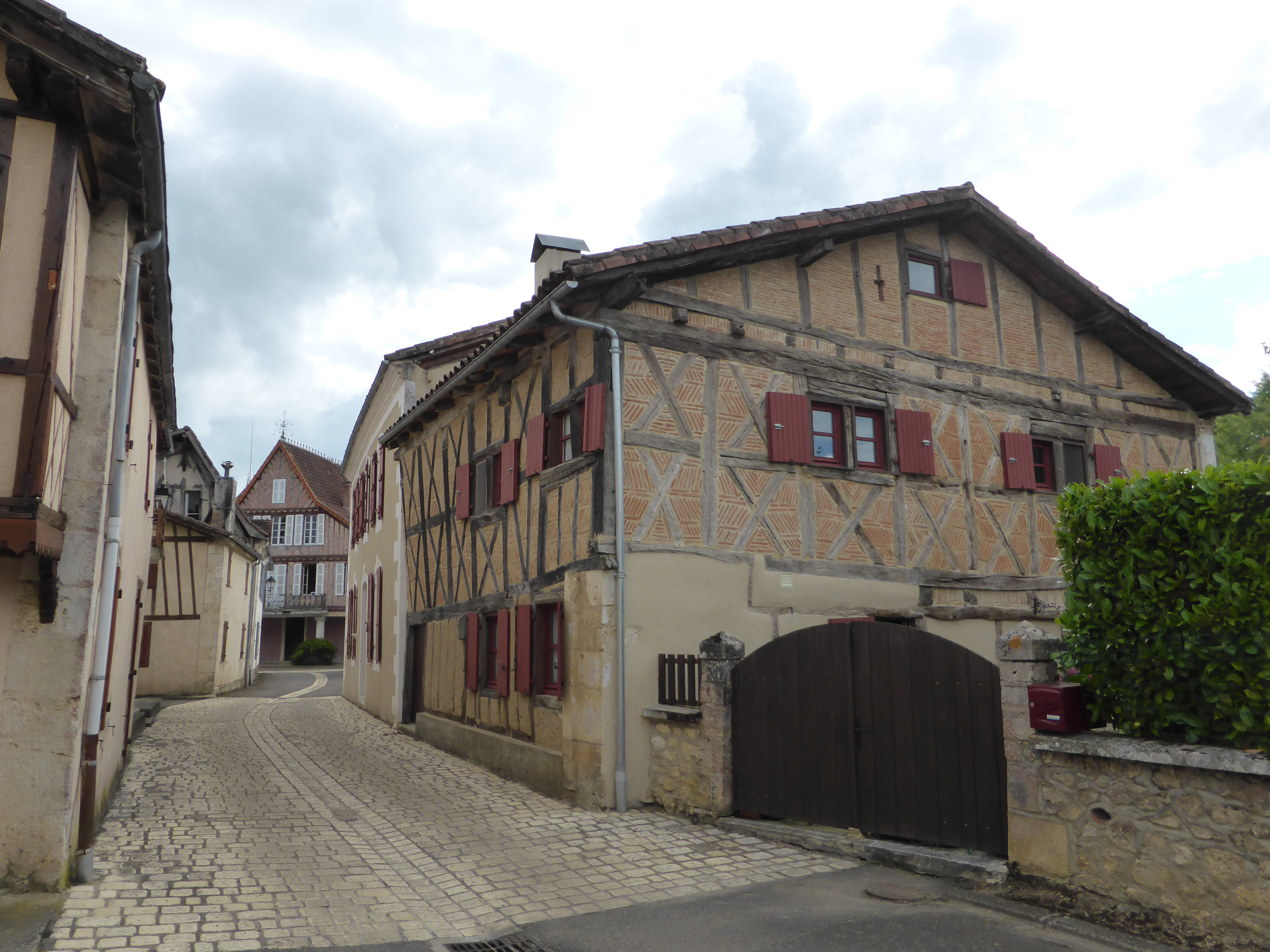
- A street in Mauvezin-d'Armagnac
- Location of Mauvezin-d'Armagnac
- Location within France Location within Nouvelle-Aquitaine
- Coordinates: 43°57′13″N 0°07′12″W
- Country: France
- Region: Nouvelle-Aquitaine
- Department: Landes
- Arrondissement: Mont-de-Marsan
- Canton: Haute Lande Armagnac
- Intercommunality: Landes d'Armagnac

Government
  - Mayor (2020–2026): Antoine Lequertier
- Area^{1}: 4.68 km^{2} (1.81 sq mi)
- Elevation: 96 m (315 ft)
- Highest elevation: 132 m (433 ft)
- Lowest elevation: 82 m (269 ft)
- Population (2023): 105
  - Density: 22.4/km^{2} (58.1/sq mi)
- Time zone: UTC+01:00 (CET)
  - Summer (DST): UTC+02:00 (CEST)
- INSEE/Postal code: 40176 /40240
- ^{1} French Land Register data, which excludes lakes, ponds, glaciers > 1 km^{2} (0.386 sq mi or 247 acres) and river estuaries.

Mauvezin-d'Armagnac (French pronunciation: [mov(ə)zɛ̃ daʁmaɲak], literally Mauvezin of Armagnac; Occitan: Mauvesin d'Armanhac) is a commune in the Landes department in Nouvelle-Aquitaine in south-western France.

== Notable people ==
Diana Rigg, owner of a property in the village where she often resided.

== See also ==
- Communes of the Landes department
