= Bourriot-Bergonce =

- Commune
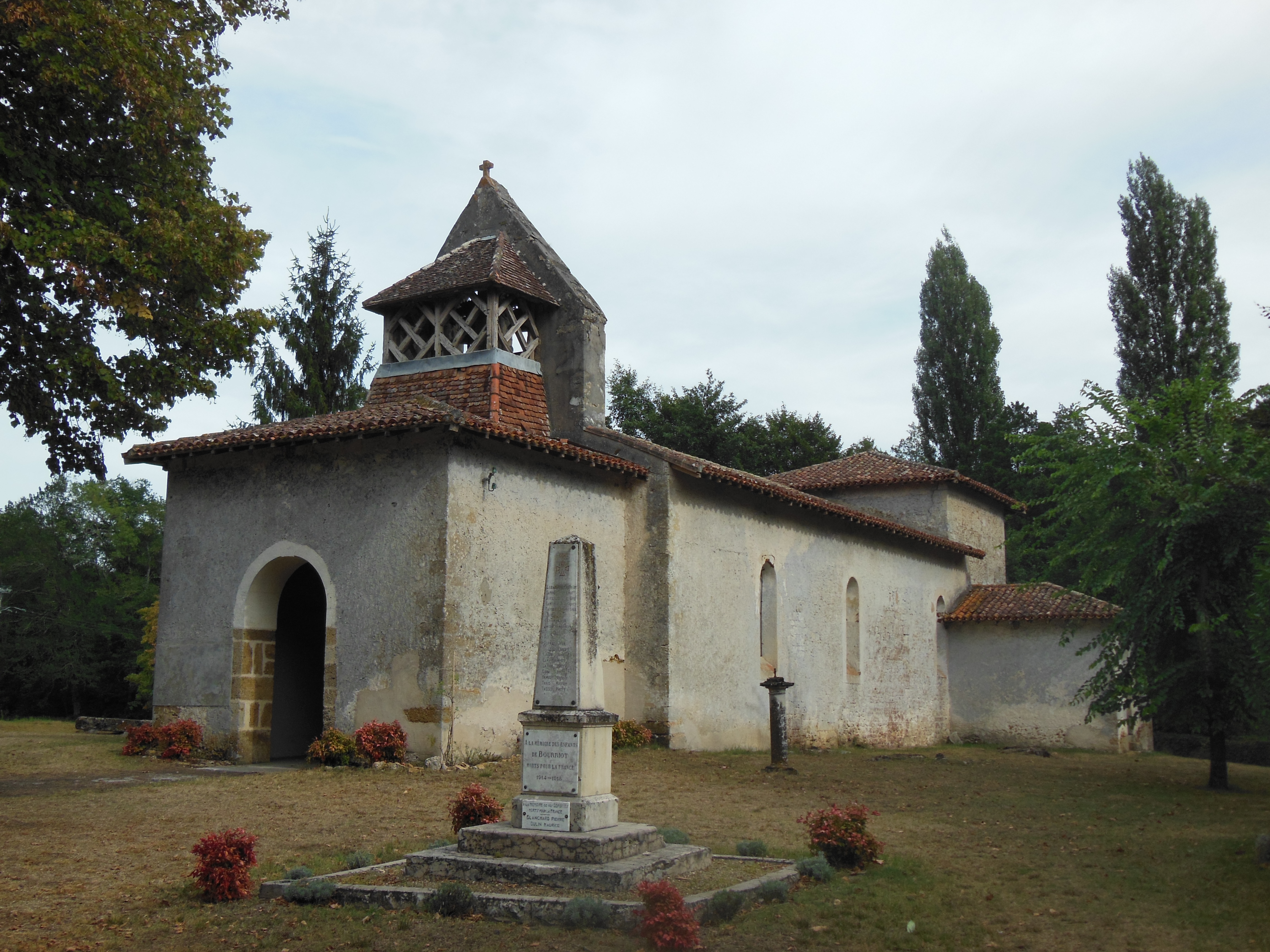
- Location of Bourriot-Bergonce
- Location within France Location within Nouvelle-Aquitaine
- Coordinates: 44°07′42″N 0°14′58″W
- Country: France
- Region: Nouvelle-Aquitaine
- Department: Landes
- Arrondissement: Mont-de-Marsan
- Canton: Haute Lande Armagnac
- Intercommunality: Landes d'Armagnac

Government
  - Mayor (2020–2026): Nadine Lalagüe
- Area^{1}: 82.65 km^{2} (31.91 sq mi)
- Elevation: 115 m (377 ft)
- Highest elevation: 148 m (486 ft)
- Lowest elevation: 89 m (292 ft)
- Population (2023): 326
  - Density: 3.94/km^{2} (10.2/sq mi)
- Time zone: UTC+01:00 (CET)
  - Summer (DST): UTC+02:00 (CEST)
- INSEE/Postal code: 40053 /40120
- ^{1} French Land Register data, which excludes lakes, ponds, glaciers > 1 km^{2} (0.386 sq mi or 247 acres) and river estuaries.

Bourriot-Bergonce (French pronunciation: [buʁjo bɛʁɡɔ̃s]; Occitan: Borriòt e Bergonsa) is a commune in the Landes department in Nouvelle-Aquitaine in southwestern France.

== Population ==
Historical population
Year	Pop.	±% p.a.
1968	490	—
1975	423	−2.08%
1982	383	−1.41%
1990	305	−2.81%
1999	311	+0.22%
2007	312	+0.04%
2012	335	+1.43%
2017	310	−1.54%
2023	326	+0.84%
Source: INSEE

== See also ==
- Communes of the Landes department
