= Cère, Landes =

Cère
- Commune
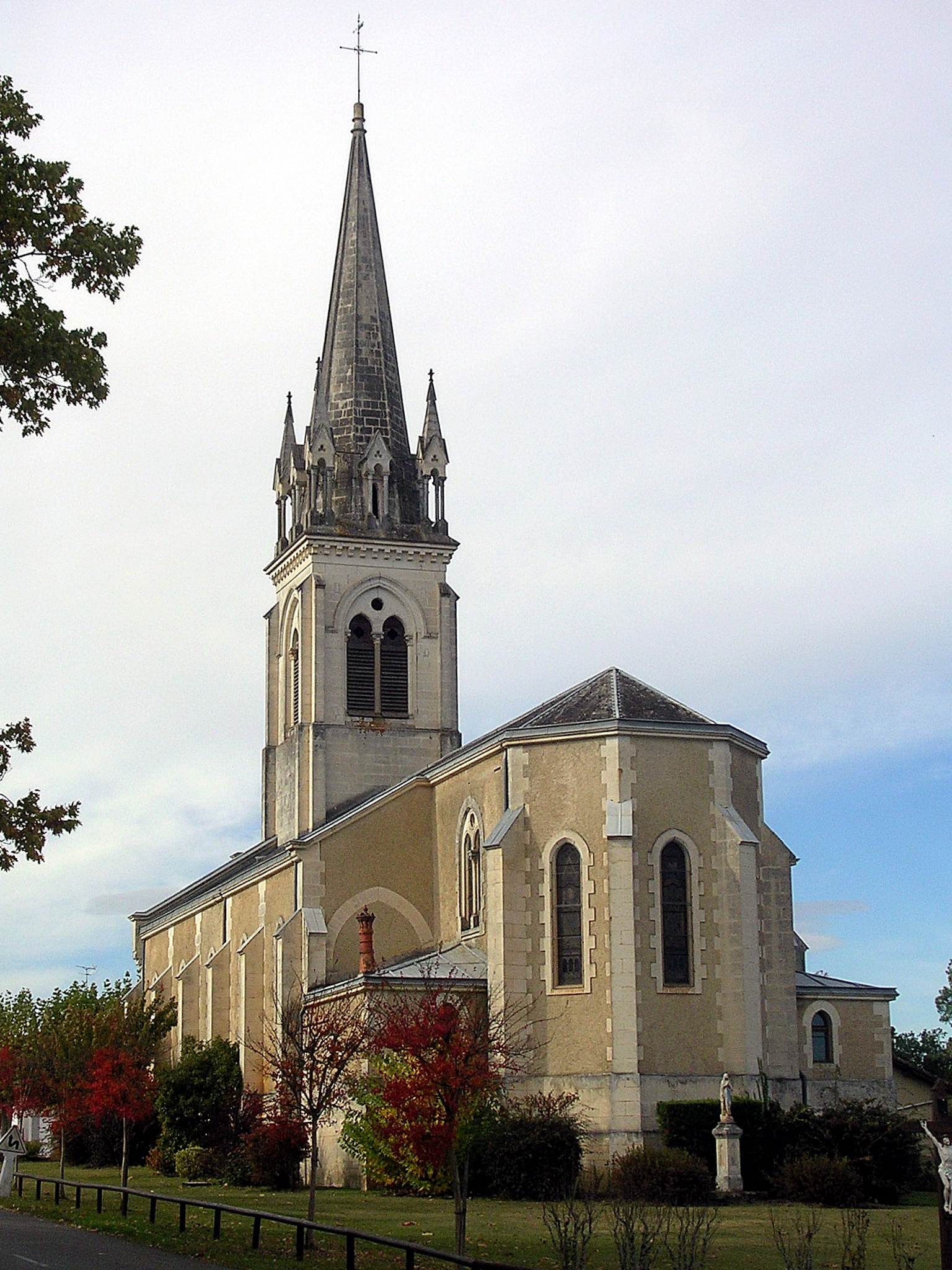
- Location of Cère
- Location within France Location within Nouvelle-Aquitaine
- Coordinates: 43°59′34″N 0°32′01″W
- Country: France
- Region: Nouvelle-Aquitaine
- Department: Landes
- Arrondissement: Mont-de-Marsan
- Canton: Haute Lande Armagnac

Government
  - Mayor (2020–2026): Michel Bareyt
- Area^{1}: 39.87 km^{2} (15.39 sq mi)
- Elevation: 49 m (161 ft)
- Highest elevation: 99 m (325 ft)
- Lowest elevation: 42 m (138 ft)
- Population (2023): 420
  - Density: 11/km^{2} (27/sq mi)
- Time zone: UTC+01:00 (CET)
  - Summer (DST): UTC+02:00 (CEST)
- INSEE/Postal code: 40081 /40090
- ^{1} French Land Register data, which excludes lakes, ponds, glaciers > 1 km^{2} (0.386 sq mi or 247 acres) and river estuaries.

Cère (French pronunciation: [sɛʁ]; Occitan: Cèra) is a commune in the Landes department in Nouvelle-Aquitaine in southwestern France.

== Population ==
Historical population
Year	Pop.	±% p.a.
1968	254	—
1975	225	−1.72%
1982	258	+1.97%
1990	279	+0.98%
1999	274	−0.20%
2007	399	+4.81%
2012	407	+0.40%
2017	411	+0.20%
2023	420	+0.36%
Source: INSEE

== See also ==
- Communes of the Landes department
