= Saint-Julien-d'Armagnac =

- Commune
- Location of Saint-Julien-d'Armagnac
- Location within France Location within Nouvelle-Aquitaine
- Coordinates: 43°59′03″N 0°07′42″W
- Country: France
- Region: Nouvelle-Aquitaine
- Department: Landes
- Arrondissement: Mont-de-Marsan
- Canton: Haute Lande Armagnac

Government
  - Mayor (2020–2026): Sophie Ducoudré
- Area^{1}: 14.64 km^{2} (5.65 sq mi)
- Elevation: 110 m (360 ft)
- Highest elevation: 157 m (515 ft)
- Lowest elevation: 94 m (308 ft)
- Population (2023): 108
  - Density: 7.38/km^{2} (19.1/sq mi)
- Time zone: UTC+01:00 (CET)
  - Summer (DST): UTC+02:00 (CEST)
- INSEE/Postal code: 40265 /40240
- ^{1} French Land Register data, which excludes lakes, ponds, glaciers > 1 km^{2} (0.386 sq mi or 247 acres) and river estuaries.

Saint-Julien-d'Armagnac (Gascon: Sent Julian d'Armanhac) is a commune in the Landes department in Nouvelle-Aquitaine in southwestern France.

== Population ==
Historical population
Year	Pop.	±% p.a.
1968	160	—
1975	159	−0.09%
1982	156	−0.27%
1990	139	−1.43%
1999	102	−3.38%
2007	116	+1.62%
2012	112	−0.70%
2017	108	−0.72%
2023	108	+0.00%
Source: INSEE

== See also ==
- Communes of the Landes department
