= Vert, Landes =

Vert
- Commune
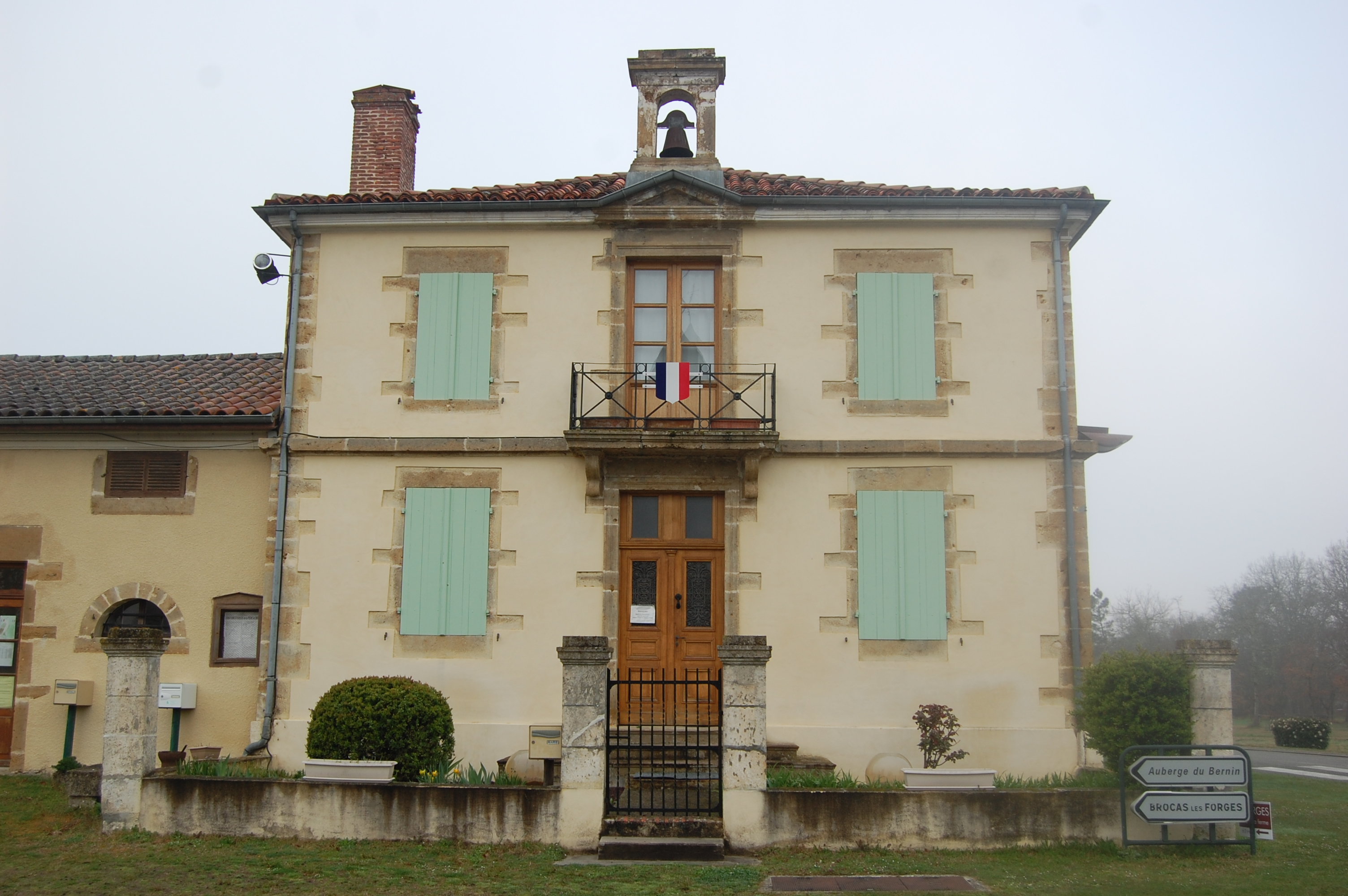
- Town hall
- Location of Vert
- Location within France Location within Nouvelle-Aquitaine
- Coordinates: 44°05′29″N 0°34′44″W
- Country: France
- Region: Nouvelle-Aquitaine
- Department: Landes
- Arrondissement: Mont-de-Marsan
- Canton: Haute Lande Armagnac

Government
  - Mayor (2020–2026): Denis Lanusse
- Area^{1}: 40.03 km^{2} (15.46 sq mi)
- Elevation: 90 m (300 ft)
- Highest elevation: 106 m (348 ft)
- Lowest elevation: 69 m (226 ft)
- Population (2023): 235
  - Density: 5.87/km^{2} (15.2/sq mi)
- Time zone: UTC+01:00 (CET)
  - Summer (DST): UTC+02:00 (CEST)
- INSEE/Postal code: 40323 /40420
- ^{1} French Land Register data, which excludes lakes, ponds, glaciers > 1 km^{2} (0.386 sq mi or 247 acres) and river estuaries.

Vert (French pronunciation: [vɛʁ]; Occitan: Verd) is a commune in the Landes department in Nouvelle-Aquitaine in southwestern France.

== Population ==
Historical population
Year	Pop.	±% p.a.
1968	221	—
1975	213	−0.53%
1982	206	−0.48%
1990	193	−0.81%
1999	209	+0.89%
2007	238	+1.64%
2012	238	+0.00%
2017	270	+2.56%
2023	235	−2.29%
Source: INSEE

== See also ==
- Communes of the Landes department
- Parc naturel régional des Landes de Gascogne
