= Bélis =

- Commune
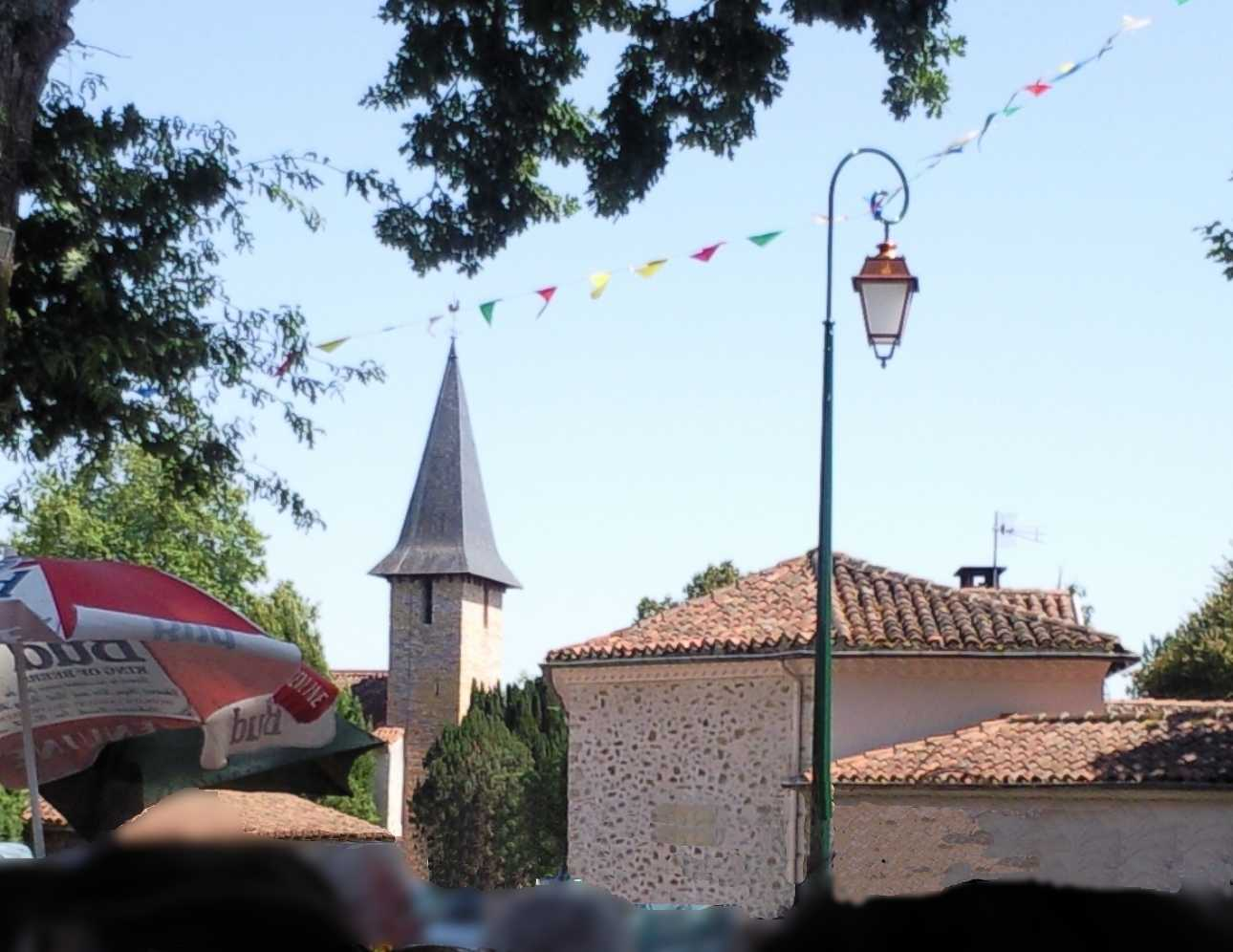
- The village during the festival
- Location of Bélis
- Location within France Location within Nouvelle-Aquitaine
- Coordinates: 44°03′52″N 0°27′36″W
- Country: France
- Region: Nouvelle-Aquitaine
- Department: Landes
- Arrondissement: Mont-de-Marsan
- Canton: Haute Lande Armagnac

Government
  - Mayor (2021–2026): Marylène Renaud
- Area^{1}: 20.46 km^{2} (7.90 sq mi)
- Highest elevation: 111 m (364 ft)
- Lowest elevation: 62 m (203 ft)
- Population (2023): 166
  - Density: 8.11/km^{2} (21.0/sq mi)
- Time zone: UTC+01:00 (CET)
  - Summer (DST): UTC+02:00 (CEST)
- INSEE/Postal code: 40033 /40120
- ^{1} French Land Register data, which excludes lakes, ponds, glaciers > 1 km^{2} (0.386 sq mi or 247 acres) and river estuaries.

Bélis is a commune in the Landes department in Nouvelle-Aquitaine in southwestern France.

== Population ==
Historical population
Year	Pop.	±% p.a.
1968	227	—
1975	170	−4.05%
1982	150	−1.77%
1990	128	−1.96%
1999	137	+0.76%
2007	139	+0.18%
2012	162	+3.11%
2017	165	+0.37%
2023	166	+0.10%
Source: INSEE

== See also ==
- Communes of the Landes department
