= Sarbazan =

- Commune
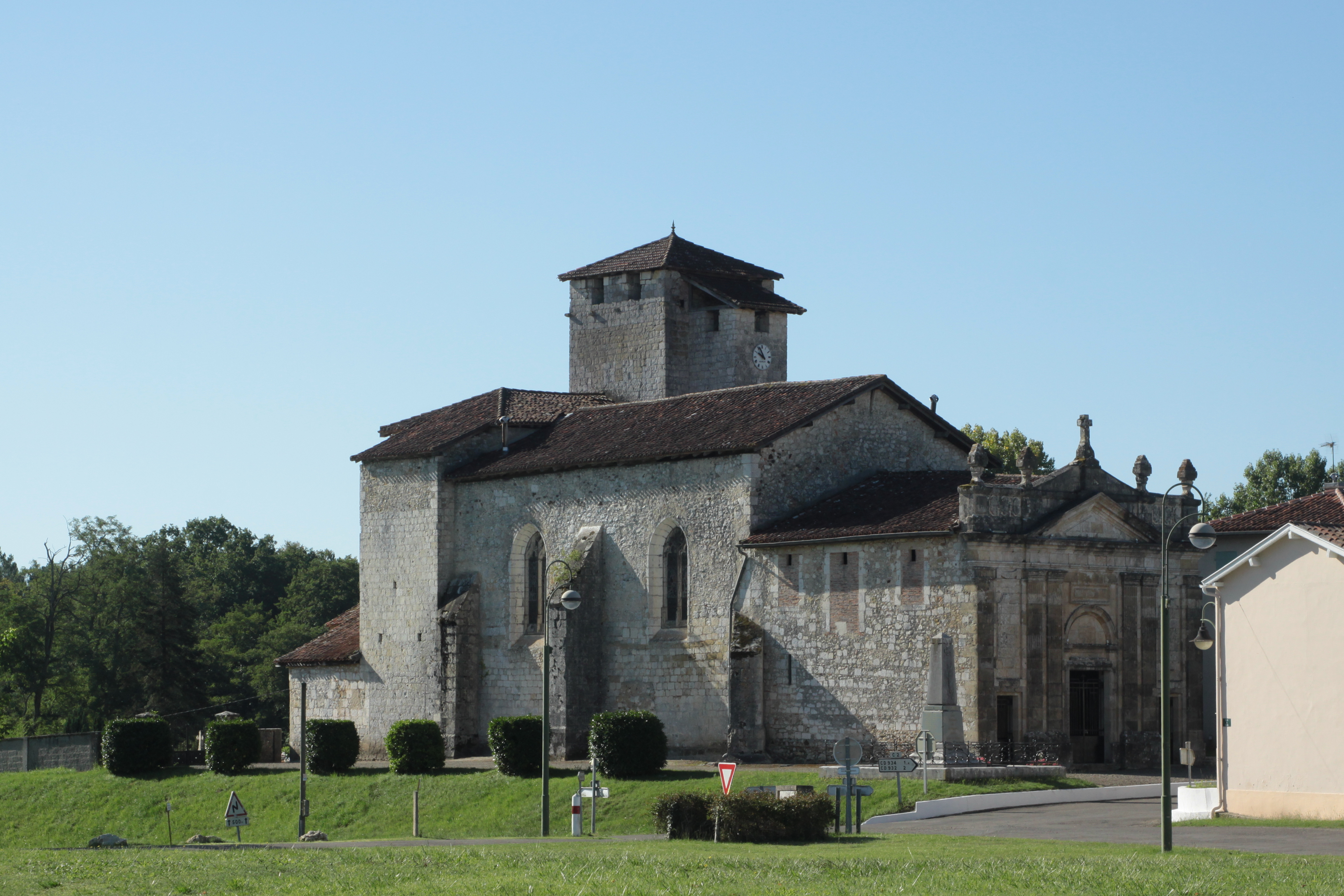

- Coat of arms
- Location of Sarbazan
- Location within France Location within Nouvelle-Aquitaine
- Coordinates: 44°01′11″N 0°18′37″W
- Country: France
- Region: Nouvelle-Aquitaine
- Department: Landes
- Arrondissement: Mont-de-Marsan
- Canton: Haute Lande Armagnac

Government
  - Mayor (2020–2026): Philippe Lamarque
- Area^{1}: 22.44 km^{2} (8.66 sq mi)
- Elevation: 100 m (330 ft)
- Highest elevation: 112 m (367 ft)
- Lowest elevation: 54 m (177 ft)
- Population (2023): 1,167
  - Density: 52.01/km^{2} (134.7/sq mi)
- Time zone: UTC+01:00 (CET)
  - Summer (DST): UTC+02:00 (CEST)
- INSEE/Postal code: 40288 /40120
- ^{1} French Land Register data, which excludes lakes, ponds, glaciers > 1 km^{2} (0.386 sq mi or 247 acres) and river estuaries.

Sarbazan (French pronunciation: [saʁbazɑ̃]; Occitan: Sarbasan) is a commune in the Landes department in Nouvelle-Aquitaine in southwestern France.

== Population ==
Historical population
Year	Pop.	±% p.a.
1968	730	—
1975	806	+1.42%
1982	872	+1.13%
1990	940	+0.94%
1999	941	+0.01%
2007	1,084	+1.78%
2012	1,138	+0.98%
2017	1,176	+0.66%
2023	1,167	−0.13%
Source: INSEE

== See also ==
- Communes of the Landes department
