= Labrit =

- Commune
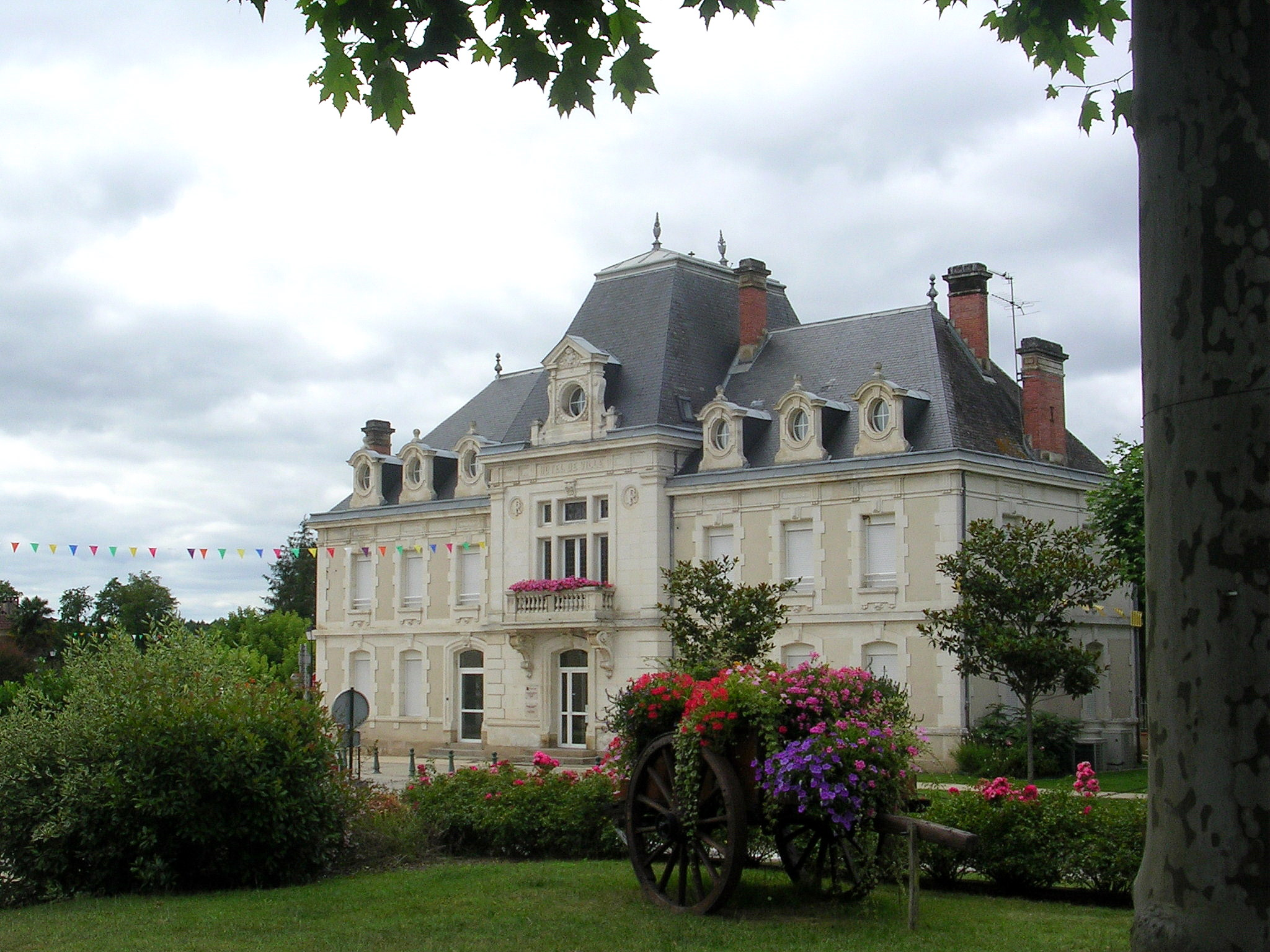
- The town hall in Labrit

- Coat of arms
- Location of Labrit
- Location within France Location within Nouvelle-Aquitaine
- Coordinates: 44°06′20″N 0°32′36″W
- Country: France
- Region: Nouvelle-Aquitaine
- Department: Landes
- Arrondissement: Mont-de-Marsan
- Canton: Haute Lande Armagnac
- Intercommunality: Cœur Haute Lande

Government
  - Mayor (2020–2026): Dominique Coutière
- Area^{1}: 72.18 km^{2} (27.87 sq mi)
- Elevation: 45 m (148 ft)
- Highest elevation: 113 m (371 ft)
- Lowest elevation: 70 m (230 ft)
- Population (2023): 842
  - Density: 11.7/km^{2} (30.2/sq mi)
- Time zone: UTC+01:00 (CET)
  - Summer (DST): UTC+02:00 (CEST)
- INSEE/Postal code: 40135 /40420
- ^{1} French Land Register data, which excludes lakes, ponds, glaciers > 1 km^{2} (0.386 sq mi or 247 acres) and river estuaries.

Labrit (French pronunciation: [labʁit]) is a commune in the Landes department in Nouvelle-Aquitaine in south-western France. As of 2018, it has a population of 861, Making it the least populous Canton seat of all Departments in France.

It was the original seat of the lords of Albret.

== See also ==
- Communes of the Landes department
- Parc naturel régional des Landes de Gascogne
