= Estigarde =

- Commune
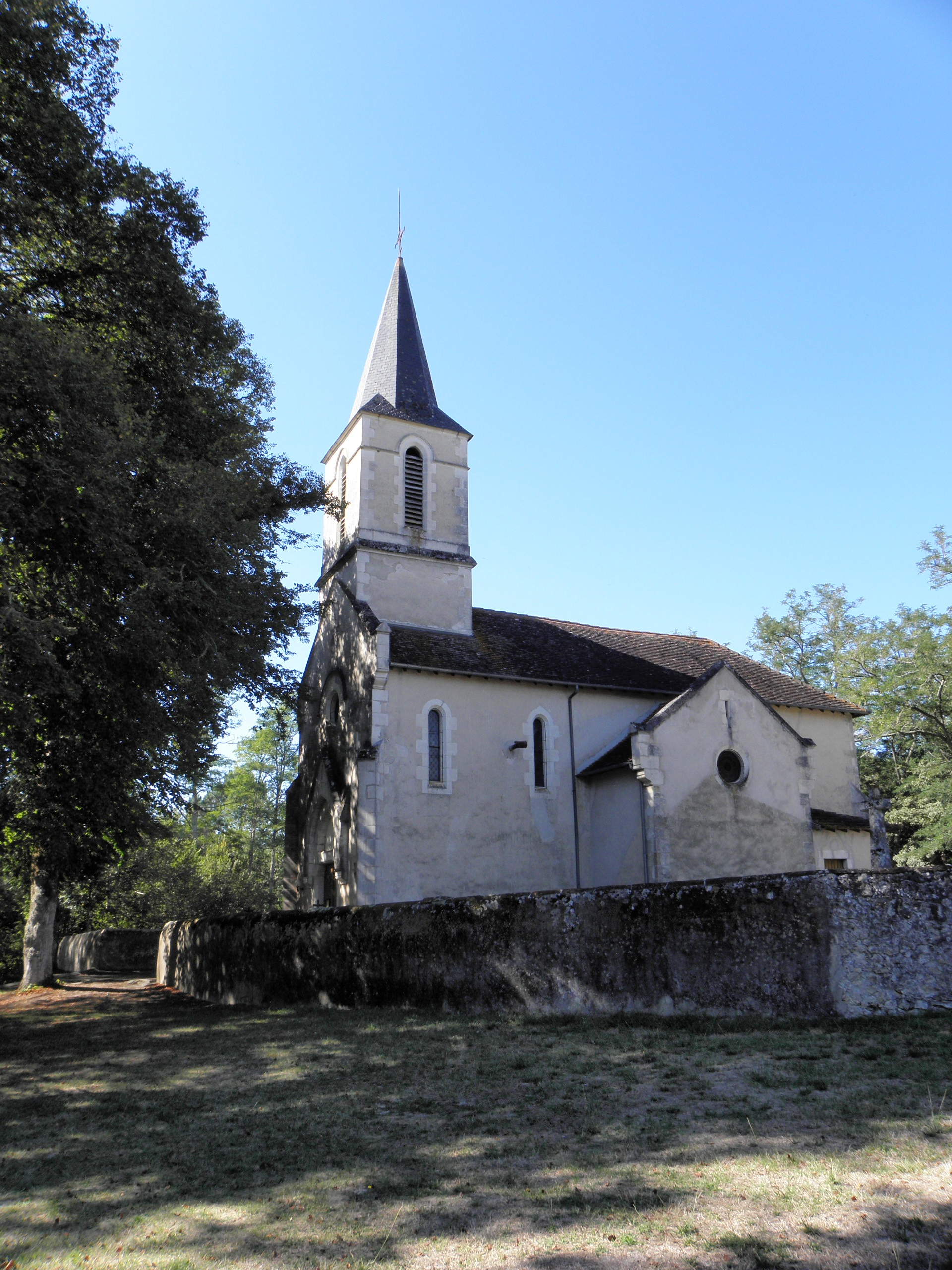
- Location of Estigarde
- Location within France Location within Nouvelle-Aquitaine
- Coordinates: 44°01′47″N 0°06′44″W
- Country: France
- Region: Nouvelle-Aquitaine
- Department: Landes
- Arrondissement: Mont-de-Marsan
- Canton: Haute Lande Armagnac

Government
  - Mayor (2020–2026): Michel Herrero
- Area^{1}: 29.65 km^{2} (11.45 sq mi)
- Elevation: 144 m (472 ft)
- Highest elevation: 151 m (495 ft)
- Lowest elevation: 113 m (371 ft)
- Population (2023): 100
  - Density: 3.4/km^{2} (8.7/sq mi)
- Time zone: UTC+01:00 (CET)
  - Summer (DST): UTC+02:00 (CEST)
- INSEE/Postal code: 40096 /40240
- ^{1} French Land Register data, which excludes lakes, ponds, glaciers > 1 km^{2} (0.386 sq mi or 247 acres) and river estuaries.

Estigarde (French pronunciation: [ɛstiɡaʁd]; Occitan: Estiguarda) is a commune in the Landes department in Nouvelle-Aquitaine in southwestern France.

== Population ==
Historical population
Year	Pop.	±% p.a.
1968	98	—
1975	97	−0.15%
1982	93	−0.60%
1990	93	+0.00%
1999	74	−2.51%
2007	74	+0.00%
2012	94	+4.90%
2017	121	+5.18%
2023	100	−3.13%
Source: INSEE

== See also ==
- Communes of the Landes department
