= Callen, Landes =

Callen
- Commune
- Location of Callen
- Location within France Location within Nouvelle-Aquitaine
- Coordinates: 44°17′57″N 0°28′29″W
- Country: France
- Region: Nouvelle-Aquitaine
- Department: Landes
- Arrondissement: Mont-de-Marsan
- Canton: Haute Lande Armagnac

Government
  - Mayor (2020–2026): Yann Bouffin
- Area^{1}: 87.86 km^{2} (33.92 sq mi)
- Elevation: 89 m (292 ft)
- Highest elevation: 119 m (390 ft)
- Lowest elevation: 65 m (213 ft)
- Population (2023): 153
  - Density: 1.74/km^{2} (4.51/sq mi)
- Time zone: UTC+01:00 (CET)
  - Summer (DST): UTC+02:00 (CEST)
- INSEE/Postal code: 40060 /40430
- ^{1} French Land Register data, which excludes lakes, ponds, glaciers > 1 km^{2} (0.386 sq mi or 247 acres) and river estuaries.

Callen is a commune in the Landes department in Nouvelle-Aquitaine in southwestern France.

== Population ==
Historical population
Year	Pop.	±% p.a.
1968	140	—
1975	129	−1.16%
1982	136	+0.76%
1990	143	+0.63%
1999	149	+0.46%
2007	142	−0.60%
2012	147	+0.69%
2017	144	−0.41%
2023	153	+1.02%
Source: INSEE

== See also ==
- Communes of the Landes department
- Parc naturel régional des Landes de Gascogne
