= Brocas =

- Commune
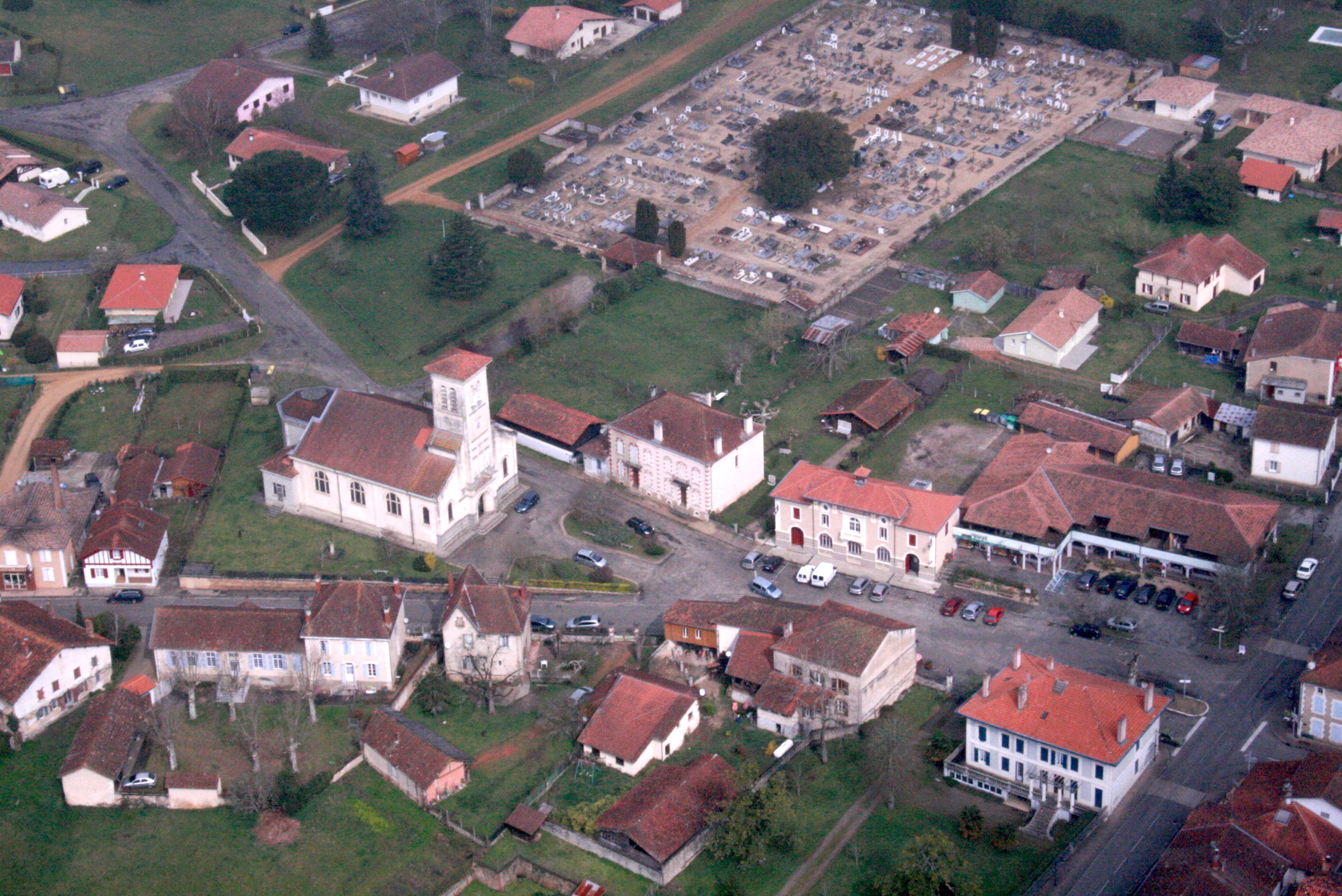
- Aerial view
- Location of Brocas
- Location within France Location within Nouvelle-Aquitaine
- Coordinates: 44°02′41″N 0°32′02″W
- Country: France
- Region: Nouvelle-Aquitaine
- Department: Landes
- Arrondissement: Mont-de-Marsan
- Canton: Haute Lande Armagnac

Government
  - Mayor (2020–2026): Jean-Luc Blanc-Simon
- Area^{1}: 53.46 km^{2} (20.64 sq mi)
- Elevation: 65 m (213 ft)
- Highest elevation: 111 m (364 ft)
- Lowest elevation: 54 m (177 ft)
- Population (2023): 721
  - Density: 13.5/km^{2} (34.9/sq mi)
- Time zone: UTC+01:00 (CET)
  - Summer (DST): UTC+02:00 (CEST)
- INSEE/Postal code: 40056 /40420
- ^{1} French Land Register data, which excludes lakes, ponds, glaciers > 1 km^{2} (0.386 sq mi or 247 acres) and river estuaries.

Brocas (French pronunciation: [bʁɔka]; Occitan: Brocars) is a commune in the Landes department in Nouvelle-Aquitaine in southwestern France.

== Population ==
Historical population
Year	Pop.	±% p.a.
1968	718	—
1975	639	−1.65%
1982	616	−0.52%
1990	656	+0.79%
1999	700	+0.72%
2007	787	+1.48%
2012	773	−0.36%
2017	789	+0.41%
2023	721	−1.49%
Source: INSEE

== See also ==
- Communes of the Landes department
- Parc naturel régional des Landes de Gascogne
