= Trensacq =

- Commune
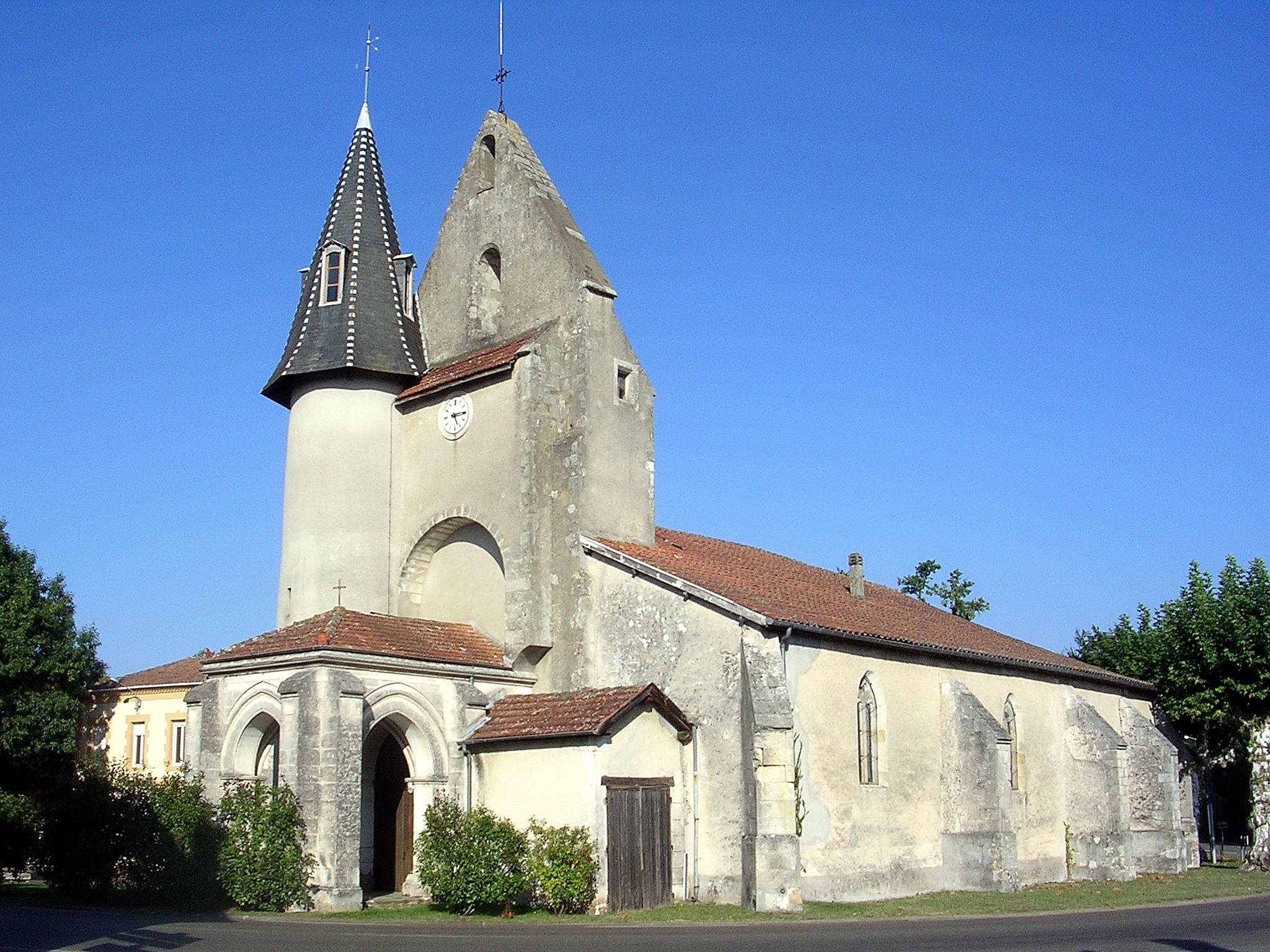
- Location of Trensacq
- Location within France Location within Nouvelle-Aquitaine
- Coordinates: 44°12′54″N 0°45′04″W
- Country: France
- Region: Nouvelle-Aquitaine
- Department: Landes
- Arrondissement: Mont-de-Marsan
- Canton: Haute Lande Armagnac

Government
  - Mayor (2020–2026): Isabelle Lacaze
- Area^{1}: 79.25 km^{2} (30.60 sq mi)
- Elevation: 65 m (213 ft)
- Highest elevation: 104 m (341 ft)
- Lowest elevation: 45 m (148 ft)
- Population (2023): 284
  - Density: 3.58/km^{2} (9.28/sq mi)
- Time zone: UTC+01:00 (CET)
  - Summer (DST): UTC+02:00 (CEST)
- INSEE/Postal code: 40319 /40630
- ^{1} French Land Register data, which excludes lakes, ponds, glaciers > 1 km^{2} (0.386 sq mi or 247 acres) and river estuaries.

Trensacq (French pronunciation: [tʁɛ̃sak]; Occitan: Trensac) is a commune in the Landes department in Nouvelle-Aquitaine in southwestern France.

== Population ==
Historical population
Year	Pop.	±% p.a.
1968	243	—
1975	198	−2.88%
1982	235	+2.48%
1990	226	−0.49%
1999	234	+0.39%
2007	276	+2.08%
2012	267	−0.66%
2017	245	−1.71%
2023	284	+2.49%
Source: INSEE

== See also ==
- Communes of the Landes department
- Parc naturel régional des Landes de Gascogne
