= Cachen =

- Commune
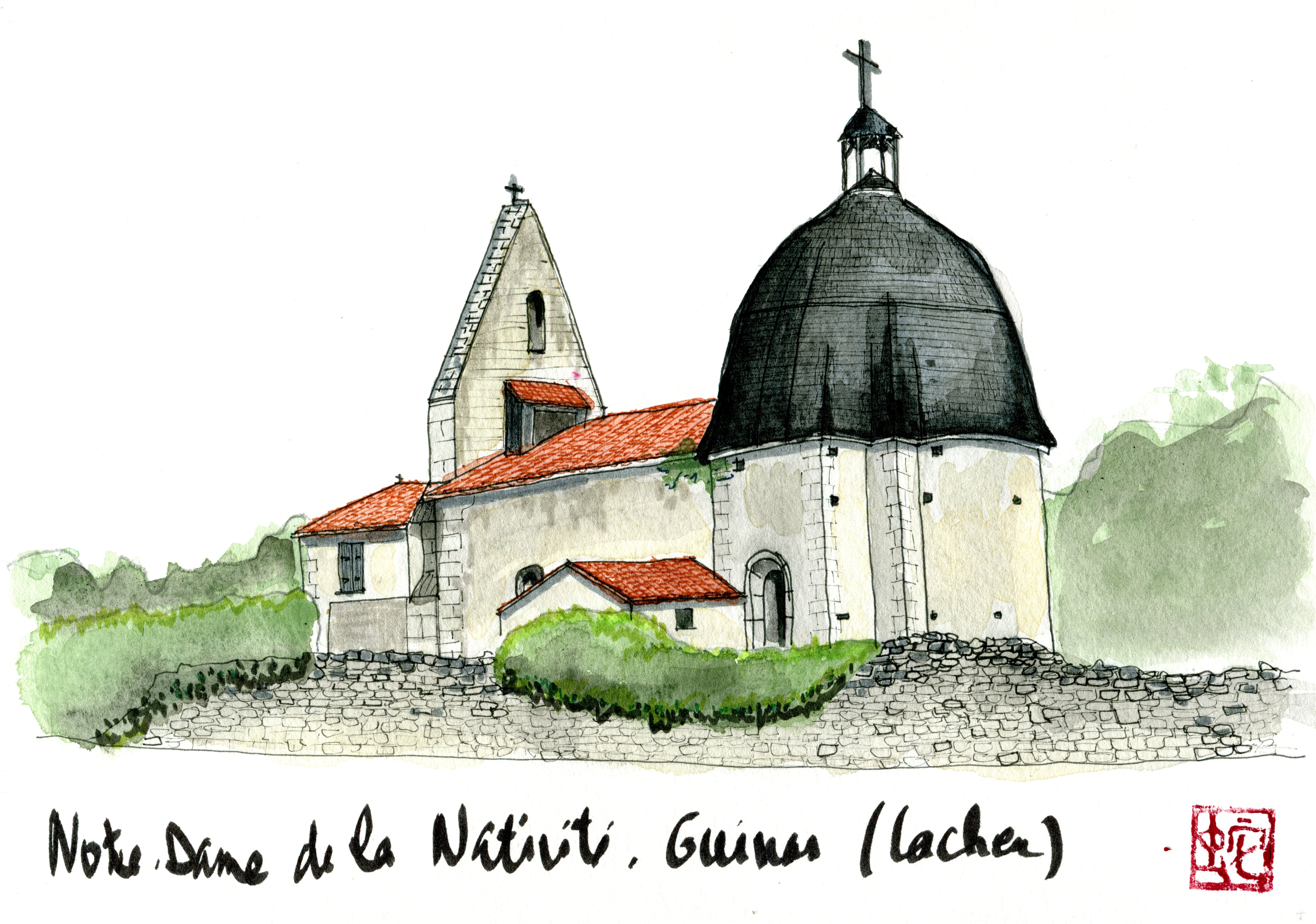
- Watercolor of the church in Cachen

- Coat of arms
- Location of Cachen
- Location within France Location within Nouvelle-Aquitaine
- Coordinates: 44°04′15″N 0°25′43″W
- Country: France
- Region: Nouvelle-Aquitaine
- Department: Landes
- Arrondissement: Mont-de-Marsan
- Canton: Haute Lande Armagnac

Government
  - Mayor (2020–2026): Marie-Rose Langlade
- Area^{1}: 35.66 km^{2} (13.77 sq mi)
- Elevation: 88 m (289 ft)
- Highest elevation: 114 m (374 ft)
- Lowest elevation: 62 m (203 ft)
- Population (2023): 233
  - Density: 6.53/km^{2} (16.9/sq mi)
- Time zone: UTC+01:00 (CET)
  - Summer (DST): UTC+02:00 (CEST)
- INSEE/Postal code: 40058 /40120
- ^{1} French Land Register data, which excludes lakes, ponds, glaciers > 1 km^{2} (0.386 sq mi or 247 acres) and river estuaries.

Cachen is a commune in the Landes department in Nouvelle-Aquitaine in southwestern France.

== Population ==
Historical population
Year	Pop.	±% p.a.
1968	312	—
1975	260	−2.57%
1982	242	−1.02%
1990	211	−1.70%
1999	216	+0.26%
2007	216	+0.00%
2012	229	+1.18%
2017	226	−0.26%
2023	233	+0.51%
Source: INSEE

== See also ==
- Communes of the Landes department
