= Lagrange, Landes =

Lagrange
- Commune
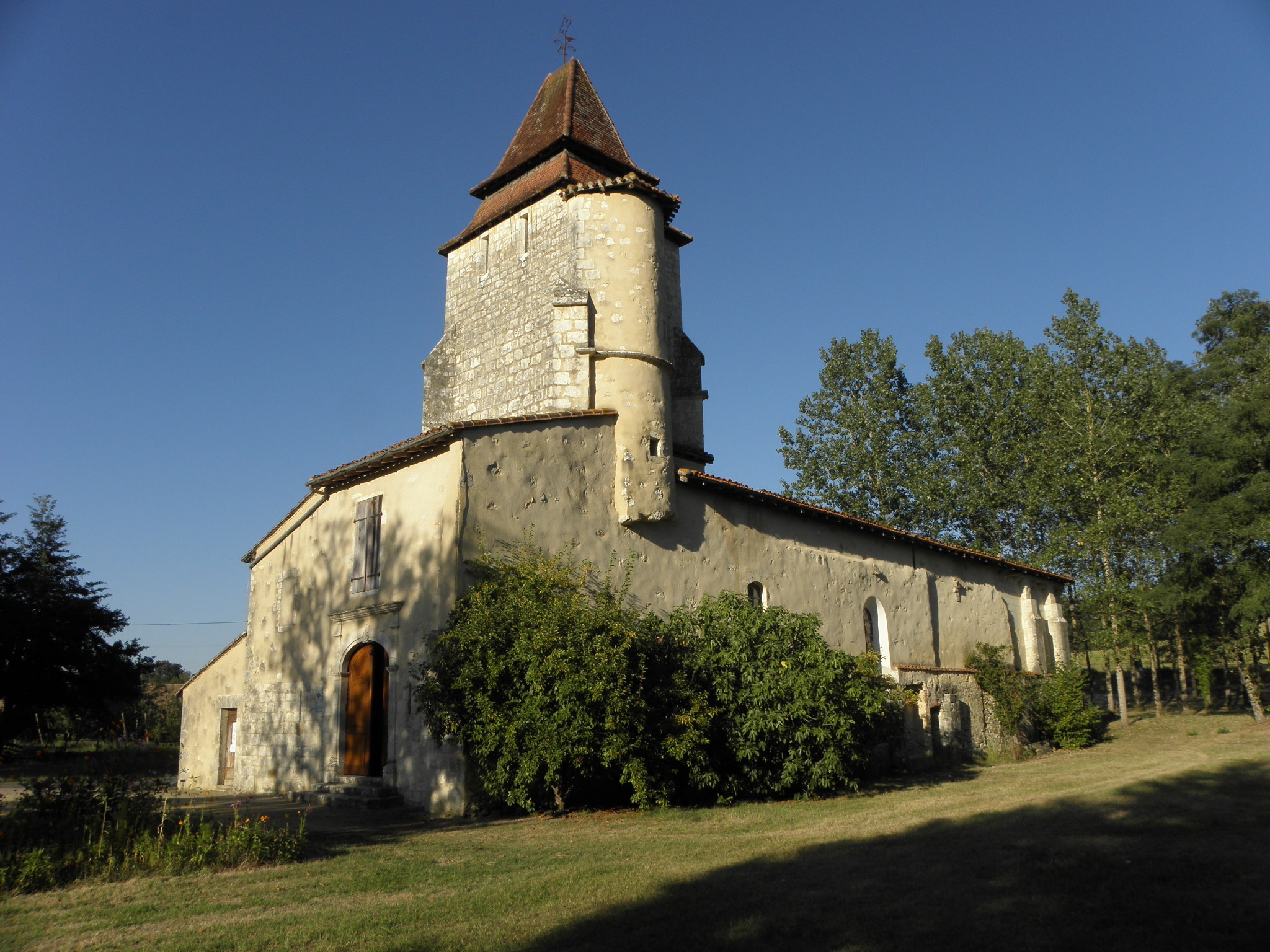
- The church in Lagrange
- Location of Lagrange
- Location within France Location within Nouvelle-Aquitaine
- Coordinates: 43°58′26″N 0°05′56″W
- Country: France
- Region: Nouvelle-Aquitaine
- Department: Landes
- Arrondissement: Mont-de-Marsan
- Canton: Haute Lande Armagnac
- Intercommunality: Landes d'Armagnac

Government
  - Mayor (2024–2026): Anthony Bister
- Area^{1}: 21.13 km^{2} (8.16 sq mi)
- Elevation: 125 m (410 ft)
- Highest elevation: 167 m (548 ft)
- Lowest elevation: 90 m (300 ft)
- Population (2023): 185
  - Density: 8.76/km^{2} (22.7/sq mi)
- Time zone: UTC+01:00 (CET)
  - Summer (DST): UTC+02:00 (CEST)
- INSEE/Postal code: 40140 /40240
- ^{1} French Land Register data, which excludes lakes, ponds, glaciers > 1 km^{2} (0.386 sq mi or 247 acres) and river estuaries.

Lagrange (French pronunciation: [laɡʁɑ̃ʒ]; Occitan: La Granja) is a commune in the Landes department in Nouvelle-Aquitaine in south-western France.

== See also ==
- Communes of the Landes department
