= Créon-d'Armagnac =

- Commune
- Coat of arms
- Location of Créon-d'Armagnac
- Location within France Location within Nouvelle-Aquitaine
- Coordinates: 43°59′44″N 0°06′16″W
- Country: France
- Region: Nouvelle-Aquitaine
- Department: Landes
- Arrondissement: Mont-de-Marsan
- Canton: Haute Lande Armagnac
- Intercommunality: Landes d'Armagnac

Government
  - Mayor (2020–2026): Catherine Dupouy
- Area^{1}: 21.26 km^{2} (8.21 sq mi)
- Elevation: 150 m (490 ft)
- Highest elevation: 163 m (535 ft)
- Lowest elevation: 110 m (360 ft)
- Population (2023): 331
  - Density: 15.6/km^{2} (40.3/sq mi)
- Time zone: UTC+01:00 (CET)
  - Summer (DST): UTC+02:00 (CEST)
- INSEE/Postal code: 40087 /40240
- ^{1} French Land Register data, which excludes lakes, ponds, glaciers > 1 km^{2} (0.386 sq mi or 247 acres) and river estuaries.

Créon-d'Armagnac is a commune in the Landes department in Nouvelle-Aquitaine in southwestern France.

== Population ==
Historical population
Year	Pop.	±% p.a.
1968	299	—
1975	289	−0.48%
1982	258	−1.61%
1990	286	+1.30%
1999	282	−0.16%
2007	306	+1.03%
2012	354	+2.96%
2017	362	+0.45%
2023	331	−1.48%
Source: INSEE

== See also ==
- Communes of the Landes department
