= Luglon =

- Commune
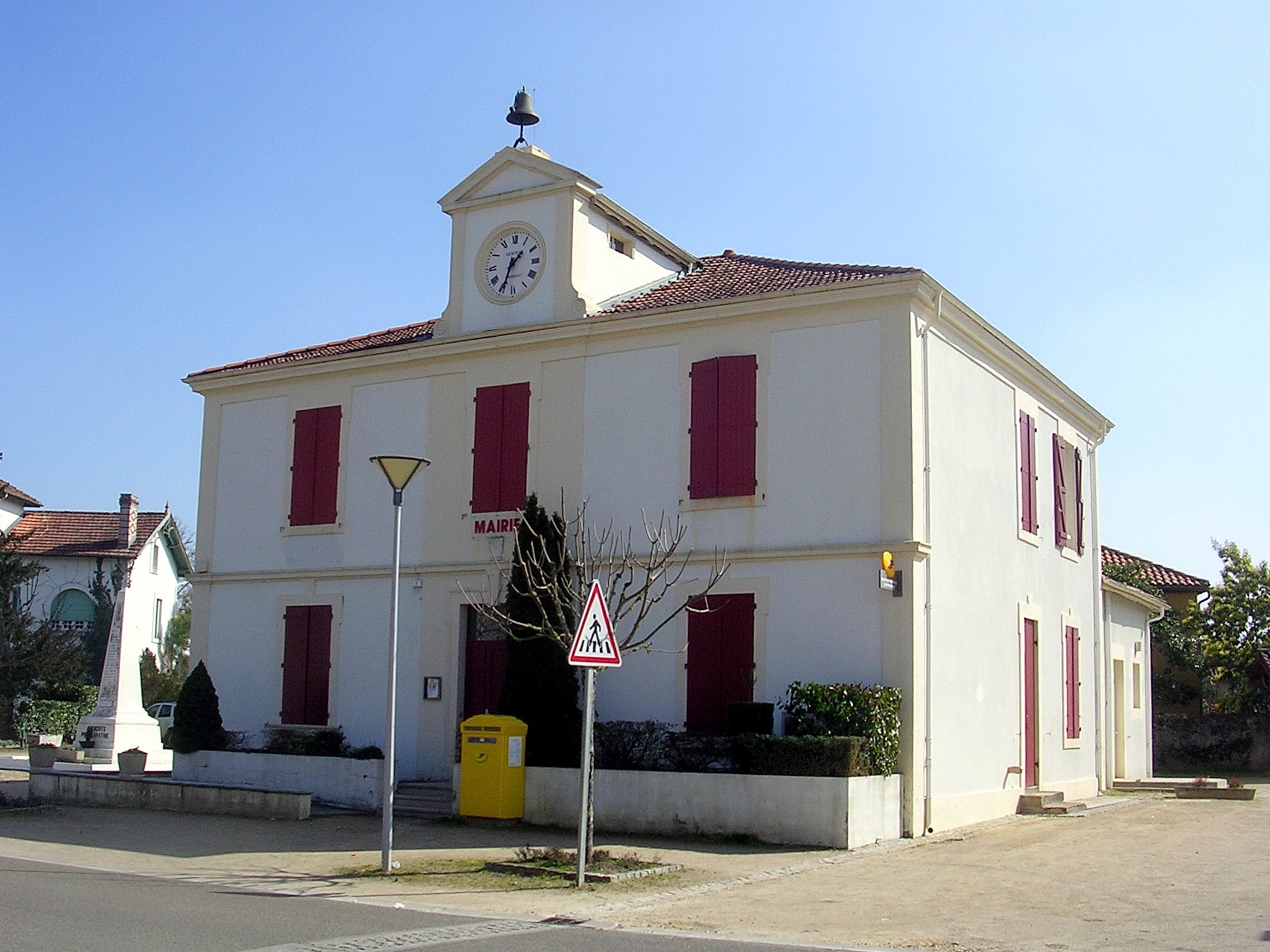
- The town hall in Luglon
- Location of Luglon
- Location within France Location within Nouvelle-Aquitaine
- Coordinates: 44°04′59″N 0°42′59″W
- Country: France
- Region: Nouvelle-Aquitaine
- Department: Landes
- Arrondissement: Mont-de-Marsan
- Canton: Haute Lande Armagnac
- Intercommunality: Cœur Haute Lande

Government
  - Mayor (2020–2026): François Mussou
- Area^{1}: 41.07 km^{2} (15.86 sq mi)
- Elevation: 90 m (300 ft)
- Highest elevation: 103 m (338 ft)
- Lowest elevation: 79 m (259 ft)
- Population (2023): 373
  - Density: 9.08/km^{2} (23.5/sq mi)
- Time zone: UTC+01:00 (CET)
  - Summer (DST): UTC+02:00 (CEST)
- INSEE/Postal code: 40165 /40630
- ^{1} French Land Register data, which excludes lakes, ponds, glaciers > 1 km^{2} (0.386 sq mi or 247 acres) and river estuaries.

Luglon (French pronunciation: [lyɡlɔ̃]; Occitan: Luclong) is a commune in the Landes department in Nouvelle-Aquitaine in south-western France.

== See also ==
- Communes of the Landes department
- Parc naturel régional des Landes de Gascogne
