= Lubbon =

- Commune
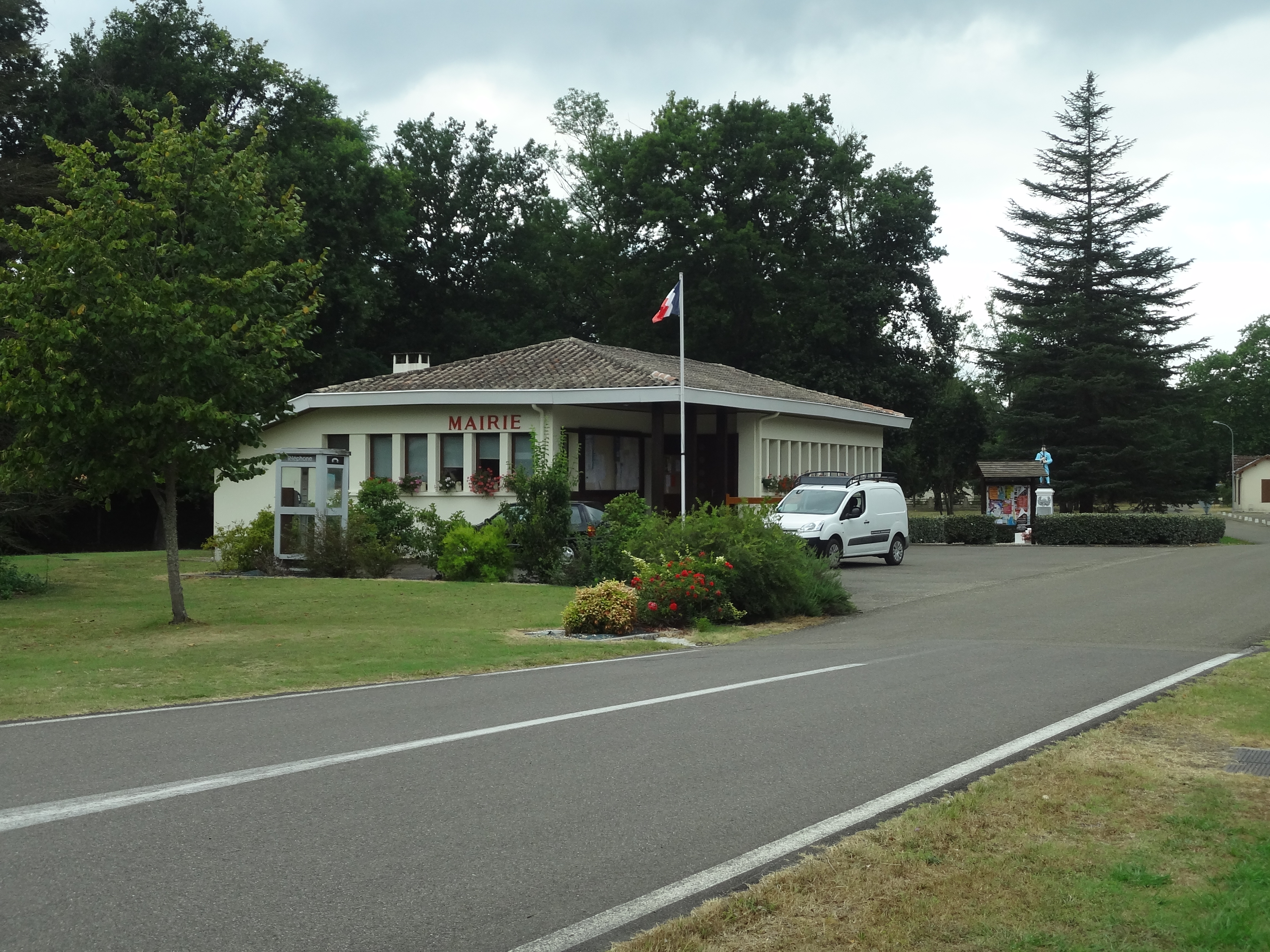
- The town hall in Lubbon
- Location of Lubbon
- Location within France Location within Nouvelle-Aquitaine
- Coordinates: 44°06′20″N 0°01′30″W
- Country: France
- Region: Nouvelle-Aquitaine
- Department: Landes
- Arrondissement: Mont-de-Marsan
- Canton: Haute Lande Armagnac
- Intercommunality: Landes d'Armagnac

Government
  - Mayor (2020–2026): Marie Joëlle Marielle Capot
- Area^{1}: 47.74 km^{2} (18.43 sq mi)
- Elevation: 150 m (490 ft)
- Highest elevation: 156 m (512 ft)
- Lowest elevation: 134 m (440 ft)
- Population (2023): 85
  - Density: 1.8/km^{2} (4.6/sq mi)
- Time zone: UTC+01:00 (CET)
  - Summer (DST): UTC+02:00 (CEST)
- INSEE/Postal code: 40161 /40240
- ^{1} French Land Register data, which excludes lakes, ponds, glaciers > 1 km^{2} (0.386 sq mi or 247 acres) and river estuaries.

Lubbon (French pronunciation: [lybɔ̃]; Occitan: Lucbon) is a commune in the Landes department in Nouvelle-Aquitaine in south-western France.

== See also ==
- Communes of the Landes department
