= Escalans =

- Commune
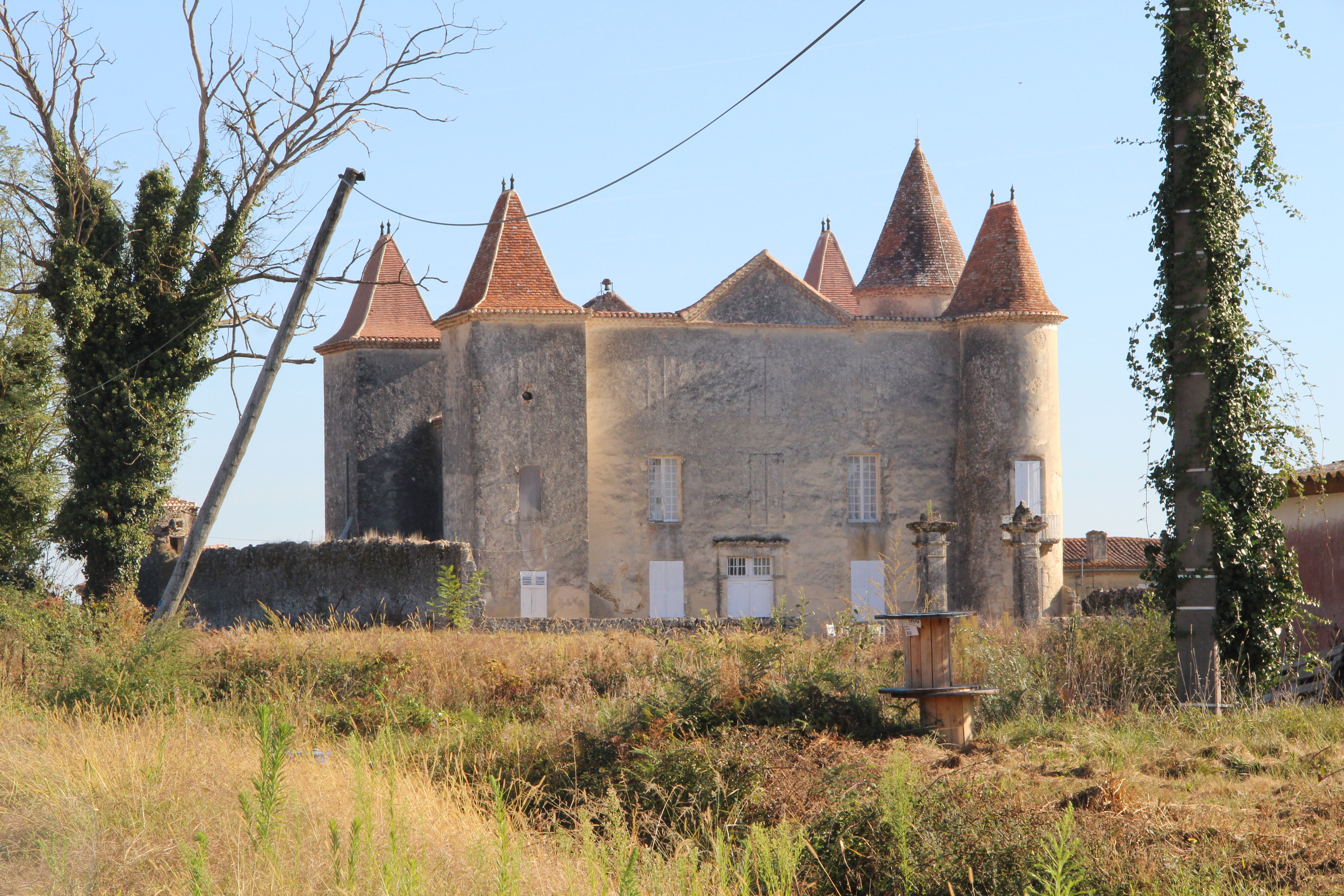
- Château
- Location of Escalans
- Location within France Location within Nouvelle-Aquitaine
- Coordinates: 44°00′51″N 0°02′38″E
- Country: France
- Region: Nouvelle-Aquitaine
- Department: Landes
- Arrondissement: Mont-de-Marsan
- Canton: Haute Lande Armagnac

Government
  - Mayor (2020–2026): Jean Barrere
- Area^{1}: 30.31 km^{2} (11.70 sq mi)
- Elevation: 150 m (490 ft)
- Highest elevation: 176 m (577 ft)
- Lowest elevation: 86 m (282 ft)
- Population (2023): 215
  - Density: 7.09/km^{2} (18.4/sq mi)
- Time zone: UTC+01:00 (CET)
  - Summer (DST): UTC+02:00 (CEST)
- INSEE/Postal code: 40093 /40310
- ^{1} French Land Register data, which excludes lakes, ponds, glaciers > 1 km^{2} (0.386 sq mi or 247 acres) and river estuaries.

Escalans is a commune in the Landes department in Nouvelle-Aquitaine in southwestern France.

== Population ==
Historical population
Year	Pop.	±% p.a.
1968	301	—
1975	251	−2.56%
1982	218	−1.99%
1990	220	+0.11%
1999	219	−0.05%
2007	248	+1.57%
2012	264	+1.26%
2017	259	−0.38%
2023	215	−3.06%
Source: INSEE

== See also ==
- Communes of the Landes department
