= Arx, Landes =

Arx
- Commune
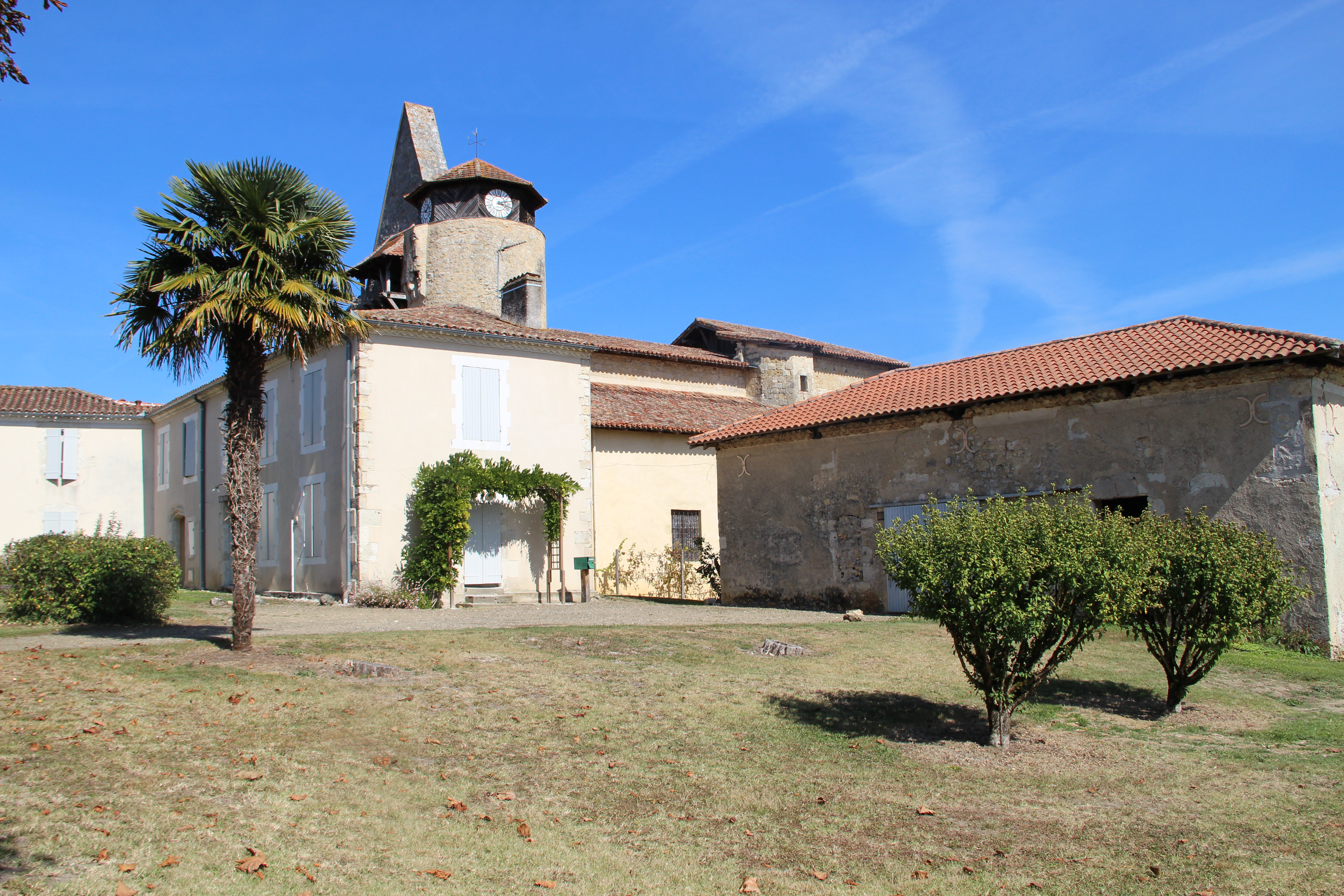
- The church of Arx
- Location of Arx
- Location within France Location within Nouvelle-Aquitaine
- Coordinates: 44°06′26″N 0°04′33″E
- Country: France
- Region: Nouvelle-Aquitaine
- Department: Landes
- Arrondissement: Mont-de-Marsan
- Canton: Haute Lande Armagnac
- Intercommunality: CC Landes Armagnac

Government
  - Mayor (2020–2026): Patricia Peter
- Area^{1}: 24.18 km^{2} (9.34 sq mi)
- Elevation: 130 m (430 ft)
- Highest elevation: 159 m (522 ft)
- Lowest elevation: 90 m (300 ft)
- Population (2023): 57
  - Density: 2.4/km^{2} (6.1/sq mi)
- Time zone: UTC+01:00 (CET)
  - Summer (DST): UTC+02:00 (CEST)
- INSEE/Postal code: 40015 /40310
- ^{1} French Land Register data, which excludes lakes, ponds, glaciers > 1 km^{2} (0.386 sq mi or 247 acres) and river estuaries.

Arx (French pronunciation: [aʁks]; Occitan: Arcs) is a commune of the Landes department in Nouvelle-Aquitaine in southwestern France.

== Population ==
Historical population
Year	Pop.	±% p.a.
1968	144	—
1975	118	−2.80%
1982	85	−4.58%
1990	88	+0.43%
1999	57	−4.71%
2007	65	+1.66%
2012	71	+1.78%
2017	58	−3.96%
2023	57	−0.29%
Source: INSEE

== See also ==
- Communes of the Landes department
