= Herré =

- Commune
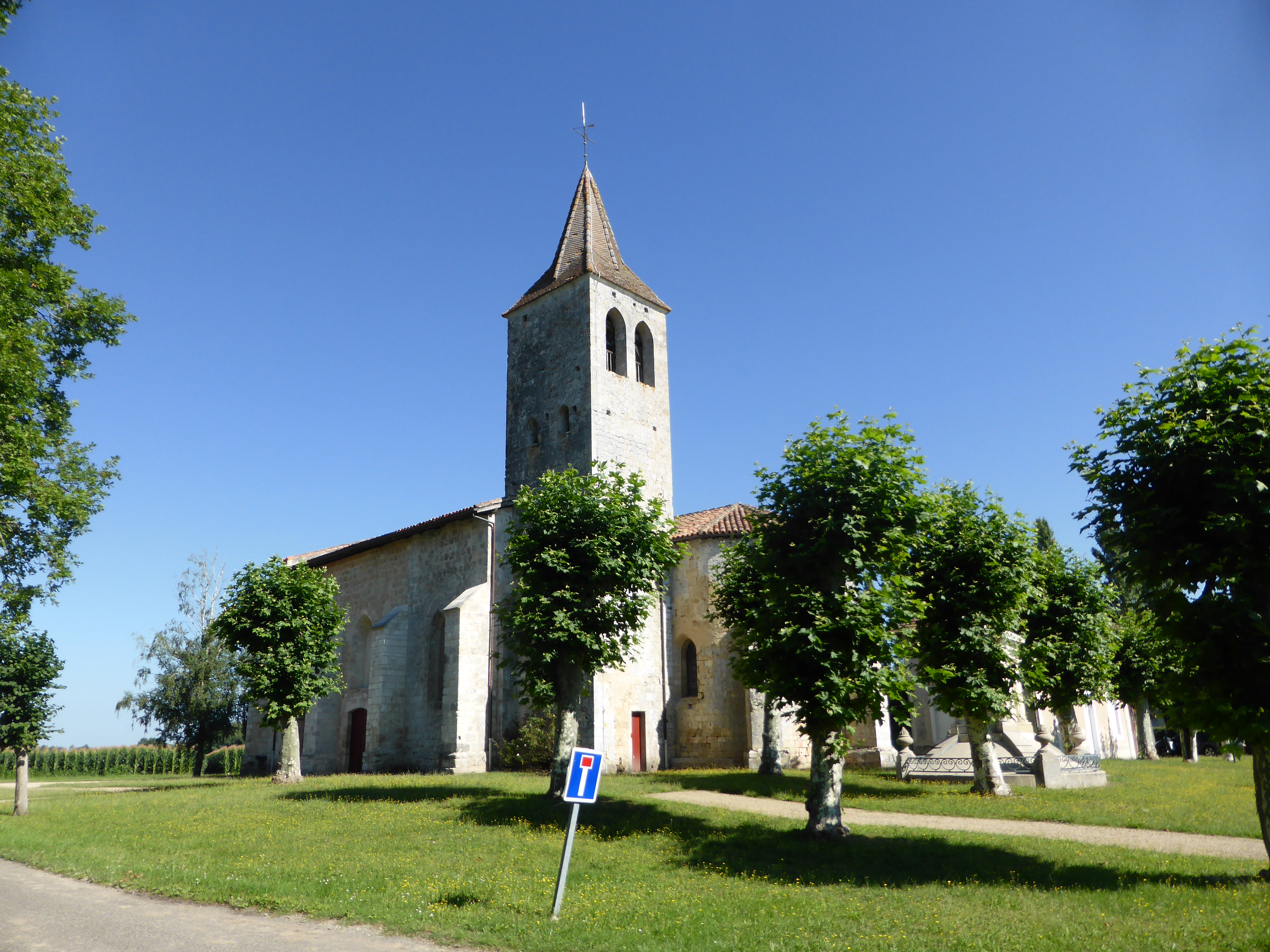
- Location of Herré
- Location within France Location within Nouvelle-Aquitaine
- Coordinates: 44°00′31″N 0°01′26″W
- Country: France
- Region: Nouvelle-Aquitaine
- Department: Landes
- Arrondissement: Mont-de-Marsan
- Canton: Haute Lande Armagnac

Government
  - Mayor (2020–2026): Brigitte Appolinaire
- Area^{1}: 23.14 km^{2} (8.93 sq mi)
- Elevation: 150 m (490 ft)
- Highest elevation: 152 m (499 ft)
- Lowest elevation: 138 m (453 ft)
- Population (2023): 143
  - Density: 6.18/km^{2} (16.0/sq mi)
- Time zone: UTC+01:00 (CET)
  - Summer (DST): UTC+02:00 (CEST)
- INSEE/Postal code: 40124 /40310
- ^{1} French Land Register data, which excludes lakes, ponds, glaciers > 1 km^{2} (0.386 sq mi or 247 acres) and river estuaries.

Herré (French pronunciation: [ɛʁe]; Occitan: Herrèr) is a commune in the Landes department in Nouvelle-Aquitaine in southwestern France.

== Population ==
Historical population
Year	Pop.	±% p.a.
1968	167	—
1975	163	−0.35%
1982	142	−1.95%
1990	126	−1.48%
1999	144	+1.49%
2007	137	−0.62%
2012	122	−2.29%
2017	142	+3.08%
2023	143	+0.12%
Source: INSEE

== See also ==
- Communes of the Landes department
