= Canenx-et-Réaut =

- Commune
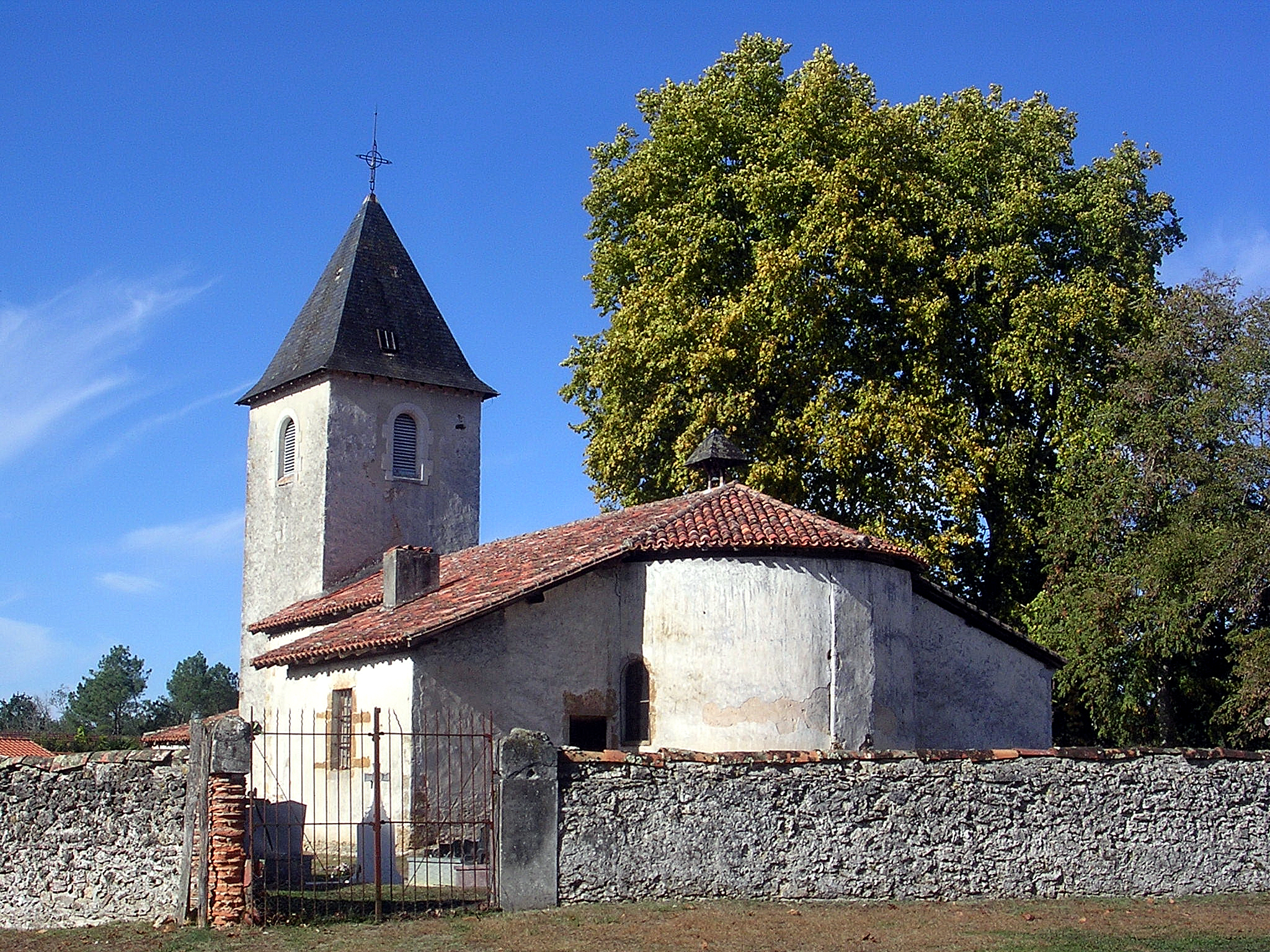
- Location of Canenx-et-Réaut
- Location within France Location within Nouvelle-Aquitaine
- Coordinates: 44°00′28″N 0°26′29″W
- Country: France
- Region: Nouvelle-Aquitaine
- Department: Landes
- Arrondissement: Mont-de-Marsan
- Canton: Haute Lande Armagnac

Government
  - Mayor (2024–2026): Pascal Bordes
- Area^{1}: 28.07 km^{2} (10.84 sq mi)
- Elevation: 76 m (249 ft)
- Highest elevation: 108 m (354 ft)
- Lowest elevation: 38 m (125 ft)
- Population (2023): 179
  - Density: 6.38/km^{2} (16.5/sq mi)
- Time zone: UTC+01:00 (CET)
  - Summer (DST): UTC+02:00 (CEST)
- INSEE/Postal code: 40064 /40090
- ^{1} French Land Register data, which excludes lakes, ponds, glaciers > 1 km^{2} (0.386 sq mi or 247 acres) and river estuaries.

Canenx-et-Réaut is a commune in the Landes department in Nouvelle-Aquitaine in southwestern France.

== Population ==
Historical population
Year	Pop.	±% p.a.
1968	182	—
1975	136	−4.08%
1982	112	−2.74%
1990	153	+3.98%
1999	135	−1.38%
2007	162	+2.31%
2012	170	+0.97%
2017	158	−1.45%
2023	179	+2.10%
Source: INSEE

== See also ==
- Communes of the Landes department
