= Baudignan =

- Commune
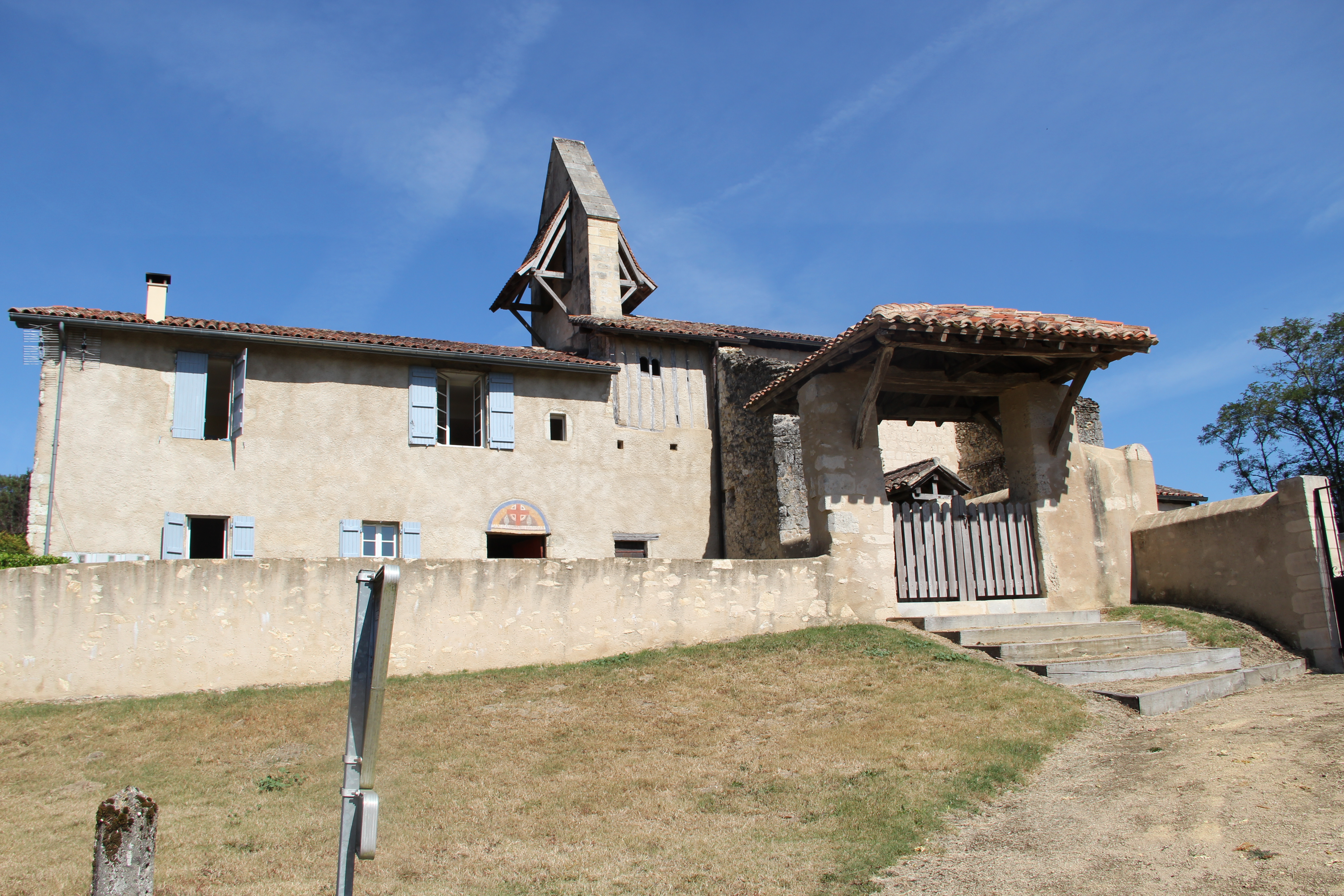
- The church of Baudignan
- Location of Baudignan
- Location within France Location within Nouvelle-Aquitaine
- Coordinates: 44°05′24″N 0°03′05″E
- Country: France
- Region: Nouvelle-Aquitaine
- Department: Landes
- Arrondissement: Mont-de-Marsan
- Canton: Haute Lande Armagnac

Government
  - Mayor (2020–2026): Gérard Duzan
- Area^{1}: 23.3 km^{2} (9.0 sq mi)
- Elevation: 149 m (489 ft)
- Highest elevation: 161 m (528 ft)
- Lowest elevation: 104 m (341 ft)
- Population (2023): 50
  - Density: 2.1/km^{2} (5.6/sq mi)
- Time zone: UTC+01:00 (CET)
  - Summer (DST): UTC+02:00 (CEST)
- INSEE/Postal code: 40030 /40310
- ^{1} French Land Register data, which excludes lakes, ponds, glaciers > 1 km^{2} (0.386 sq mi or 247 acres) and river estuaries.

Baudignan (French pronunciation: [bodiɲɑ̃]; Occitan: Baudinhan) is a commune in the Landes department in Nouvelle-Aquitaine in southwestern France.

== Population ==
Historical population
Year	Pop.	±% p.a.
1968	74	—
1975	49	−5.72%
1982	49	+0.00%
1990	40	−2.50%
1999	36	−1.16%
2007	46	+3.11%
2012	44	−0.89%
2017	54	+4.18%
2023	50	−1.27%
Source: INSEE

== See also ==
- Communes of the Landes department
