= Canton of Adour Armagnac =

Coordinates: 43.70°N 0.26°W

Adour Armagnac
- Canton
- Interactive map of Adour Armagnac
- Country: France
- Region: Nouvelle-Aquitaine
- Department: Landes
- No. of communes: {{{nbcomm}}}

Government
  - Representatives (2021–2028): Agathe Bourretere; Boris Vallaud
- Area: 583.90 km^{2} (225.45 sq mi)
- Population (2023): 23,906
  - Density: 40.942/km^{2} (106.04/sq mi)
- INSEE code: 40 01

The canton of Adour Armagnac is an administrative division of the Landes department, southwestern France. It was created at the French canton reorganisation which came into effect in March 2015. Its seat is in Aire-sur-l'Adour.

== Composition ==
It consists of the following communes:

1. Aire-sur-l'Adour
2. Artassenx
3. Arthez-d'Armagnac
4. Bahus-Soubiran
5. Bascons
6. Bordères-et-Lamensans
7. Bourdalat
8. Buanes
9. Castandet
10. Cazères-sur-l'Adour
11. Classun
12. Duhort-Bachen
13. Eugénie-les-Bains
14. Le Frêche
15. Grenade-sur-l'Adour
16. Hontanx
17. Lacquy
18. Larrivière-Saint-Savin
19. Latrille
20. Lussagnet
21. Maurrin
22. Montégut
23. Perquie
24. Pujo-le-Plan
25. Renung
26. Saint-Agnet
27. Saint-Cricq-Villeneuve
28. Sainte-Foy
29. Saint-Gein
30. Saint-Loubouer
31. Saint-Maurice-sur-Adour
32. Sarron
33. Vielle-Tursan
34. Le Vignau
35. Villeneuve-de-Marsan

== Councillors ==
Election	Councillors	Party	Occupation
2015	Marie-France Gauthier	DVD	Councillor of Grenade-sur-l'Adour
2015	Xavier Lagrave	UDI	Mayor of Aire-sur-l'Adour
2021	Agathe Bourretère	PS	Former councillor of Aire-sur-l'Adour
2021	Boris Vallaud	PS	Member of the National Assembly for Landes's 3rd constituency

== Pictures of the canton ==
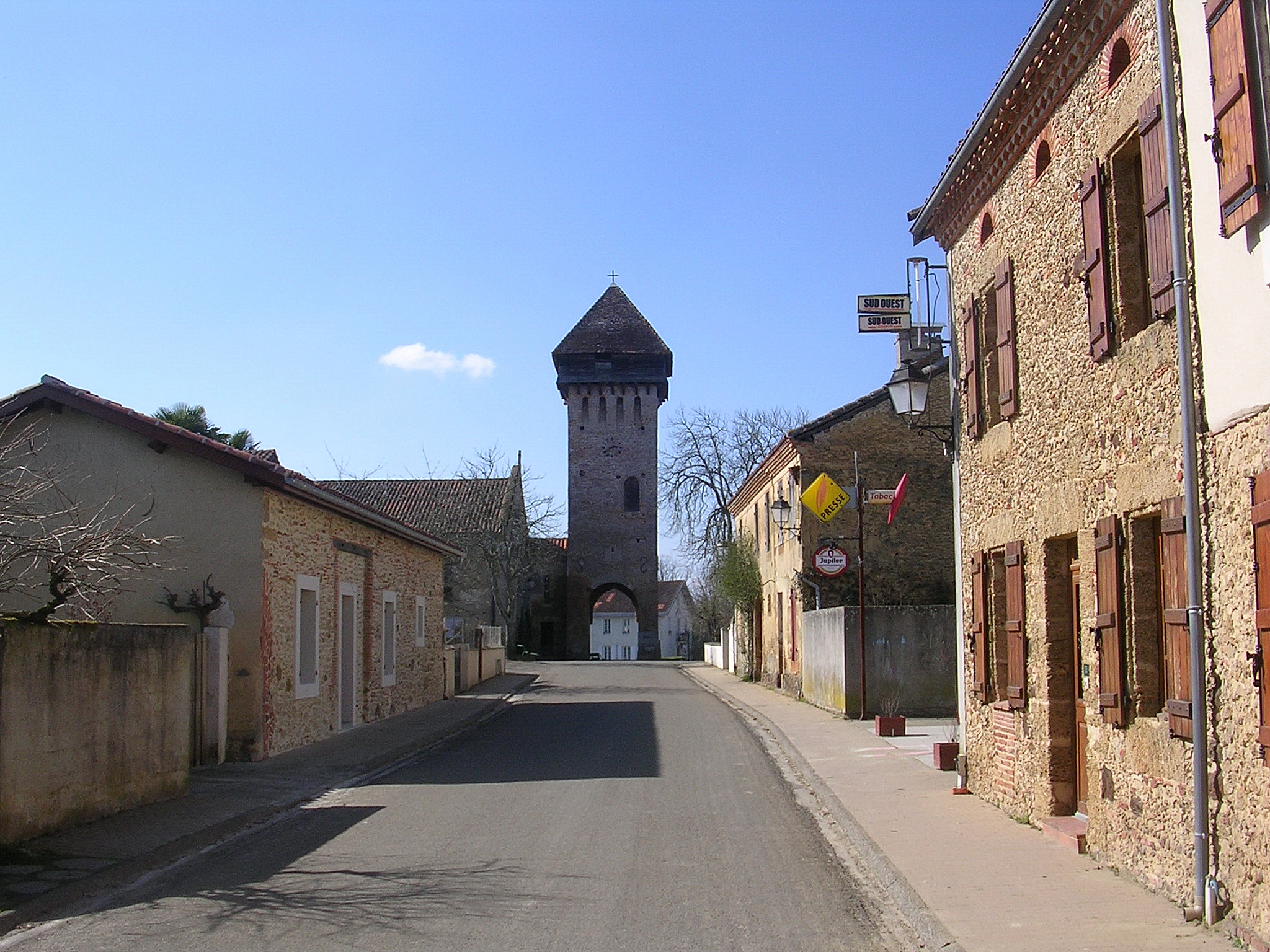
Hontanx's street

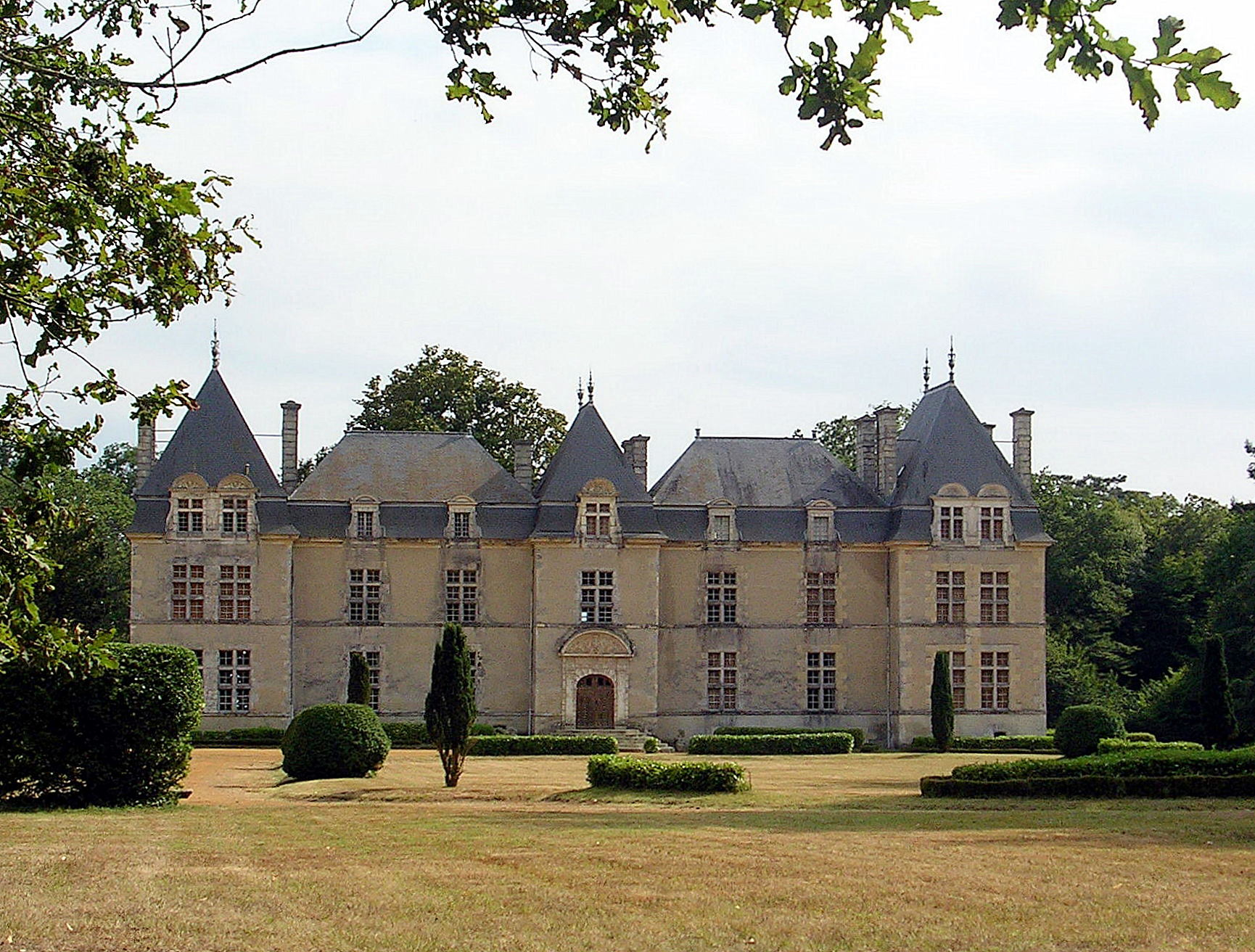
The Château de Ravignan in Perquie

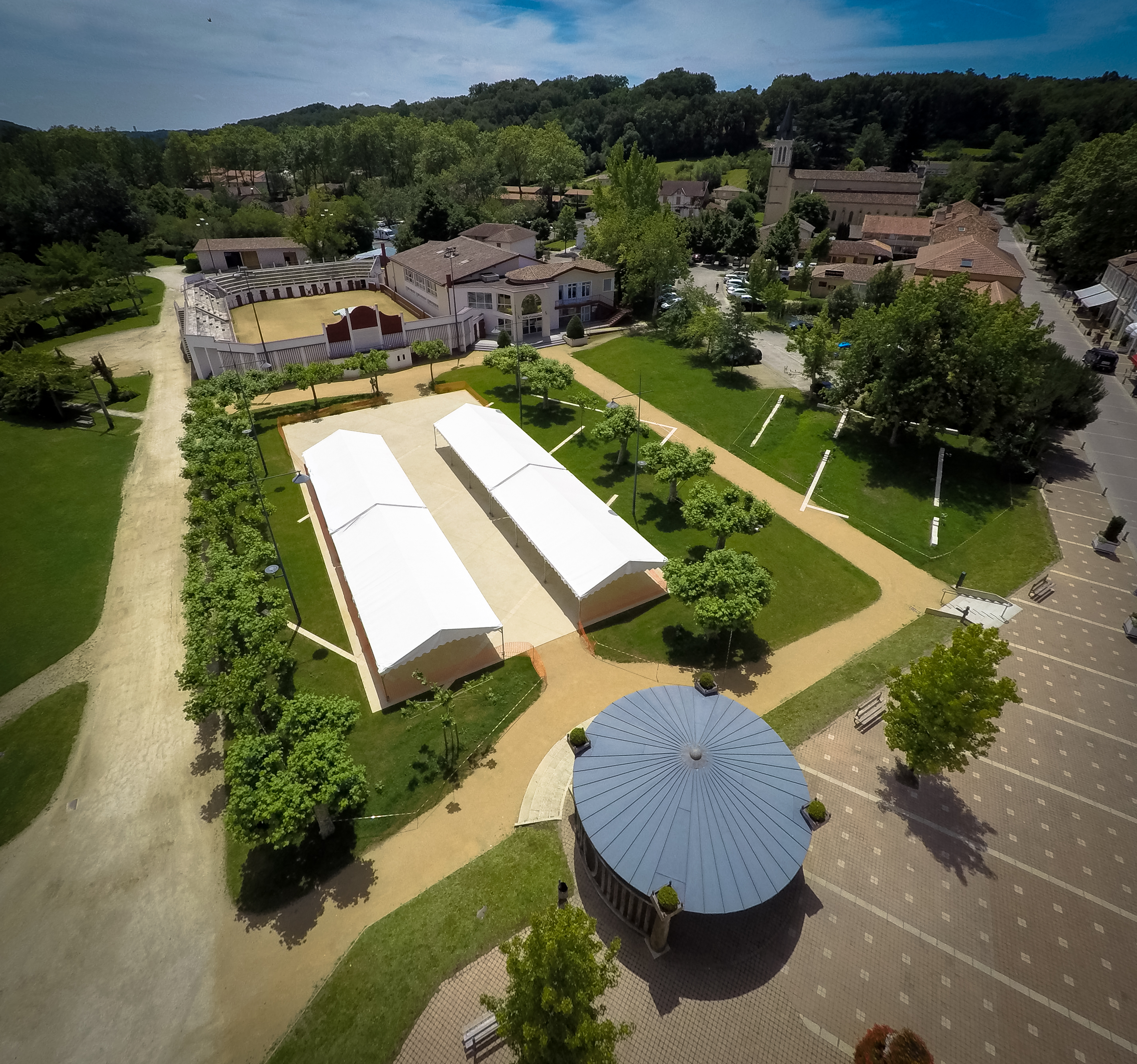
Central square of Eugénie-les-Bains
