= Frêche =

Frêche may refer to:

- Le Frêche, a municipality in the Landes department of south-west France
- Georges Frêche (1938–2010), French politician
