= Pujo (disambiguation) =

Pujo is a commune in the Hautes-Pyrénées department in south-western France.

Pujo may also refer to:

== Places ==
- Pujo-le-Plan, a commune in the Landes department in Aquitaine in south-western France
- Buyeo, also romanized as Pujo, an ancient Korean polity

== People ==
- Arsène Pujo (1861–1939), American politician
  - Pujo Committee, a US congressional subcommittee
- Maurice Pujo (1872–1955), French journalist and politician
- Pierre Pujo (1929–2007), leader of the French monarchist group Action Française

== Other ==
- Durga Puja, an annual Hindu festival
