= Artassenx =

- Commune
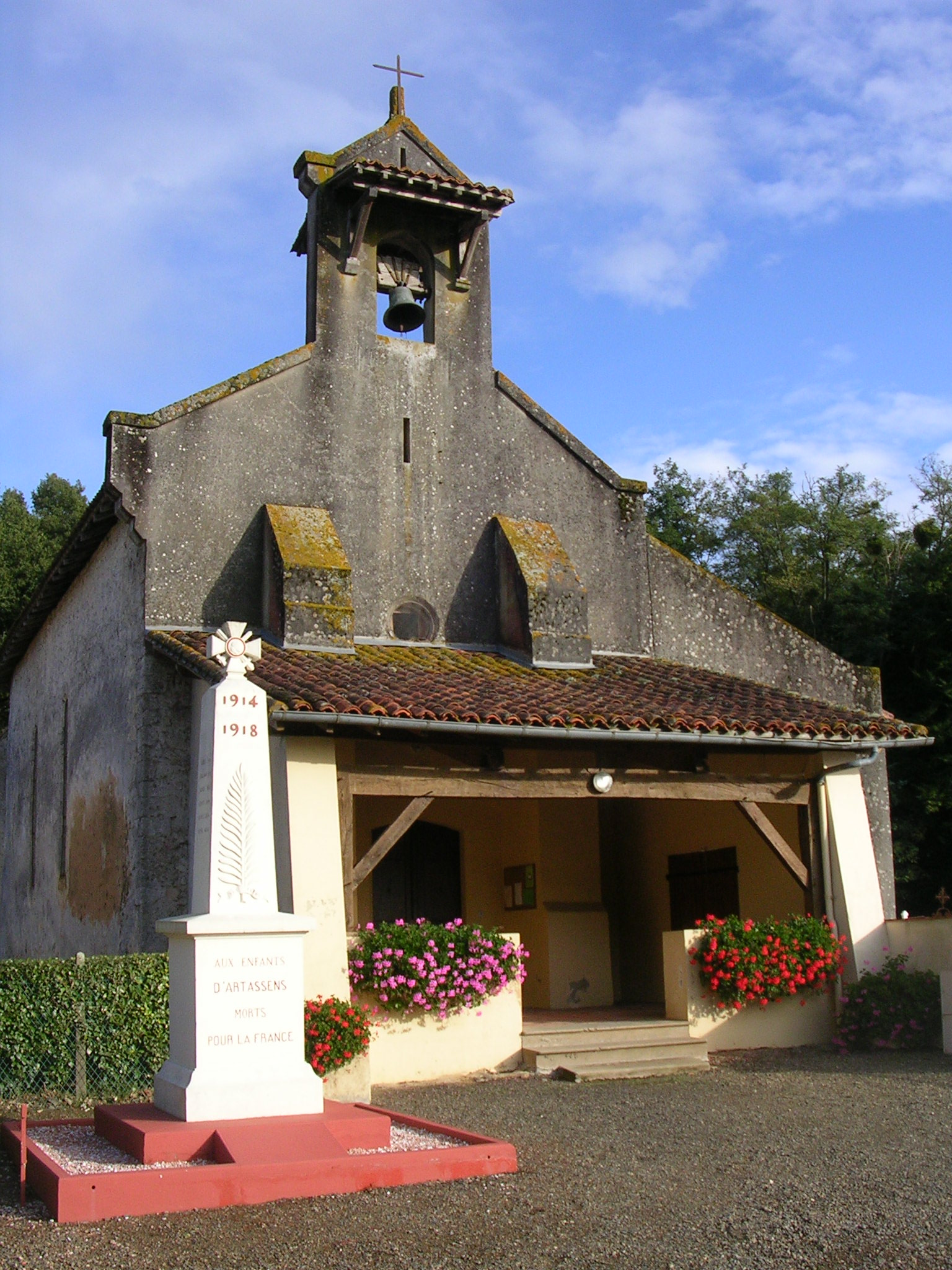
- The church of Artassenx
- Location of Artassenx
- Location within France Location within Nouvelle-Aquitaine
- Coordinates: 43°50′49″N 0°23′46″W
- Country: France
- Region: Nouvelle-Aquitaine
- Department: Landes
- Arrondissement: Mont-de-Marsan
- Canton: Adour Armagnac
- Intercommunality: CC Pays Grenadois

Government
  - Mayor (2020–2026): Éveline Lalanne
- Area^{1}: 5.5 km^{2} (2.1 sq mi)
- Elevation: 75 m (246 ft)
- Highest elevation: 122 m (400 ft)
- Lowest elevation: 79 m (259 ft)
- Population (2023): 262
  - Density: 48/km^{2} (120/sq mi)
- Time zone: UTC+01:00 (CET)
  - Summer (DST): UTC+02:00 (CEST)
- INSEE/Postal code: 40012 /40090
- ^{1} French Land Register data, which excludes lakes, ponds, glaciers > 1 km^{2} (0.386 sq mi or 247 acres) and river estuaries.

Artassenx (French pronunciation: [aʁtasɛ̃ks]; Occitan: Artassens) is a commune of the Landes department in Nouvelle-Aquitaine in southwestern France.

== Population ==
Historical population
Year	Pop.	±% p.a.
1968	162	—
1975	200	+3.06%
1982	233	+2.21%
1990	255	+1.13%
1999	244	−0.49%
2007	240	−0.21%
2012	266	+2.08%
2017	250	−1.23%
2023	262	+0.78%
Source: INSEE

== See also ==
- Communes of the Landes department
