= Lacquy =

- Commune
- Location of Lacquy
- Location within France Location within Nouvelle-Aquitaine
- Coordinates: 43°57′06″N 0°16′23″W
- Country: France
- Region: Nouvelle-Aquitaine
- Department: Landes
- Arrondissement: Mont-de-Marsan
- Canton: Adour Armagnac
- Intercommunality: Pays de Villeneuve en Armagnac Landais

Government
  - Mayor (2020–2026): Patrick Roussarie
- Area^{1}: 19.28 km^{2} (7.44 sq mi)
- Elevation: 96 m (315 ft)
- Highest elevation: 127 m (417 ft)
- Lowest elevation: 75 m (246 ft)
- Population (2023): 289
  - Density: 15.0/km^{2} (38.8/sq mi)
- Time zone: UTC+01:00 (CET)
  - Summer (DST): UTC+02:00 (CEST)
- INSEE/Postal code: 40137 /40120
- ^{1} French Land Register data, which excludes lakes, ponds, glaciers > 1 km^{2} (0.386 sq mi or 247 acres) and river estuaries.

Lacquy (French pronunciation: [laki]; Occitan: Laqui) is a commune in the Landes department in Nouvelle-Aquitaine in south-western France.

Lacquy may also refer to a brand of armagnac.

== See also ==
- Communes of the Landes department
- Château de Lacquy, Armagnac producer and distributors list
