= Perquie =

- Commune
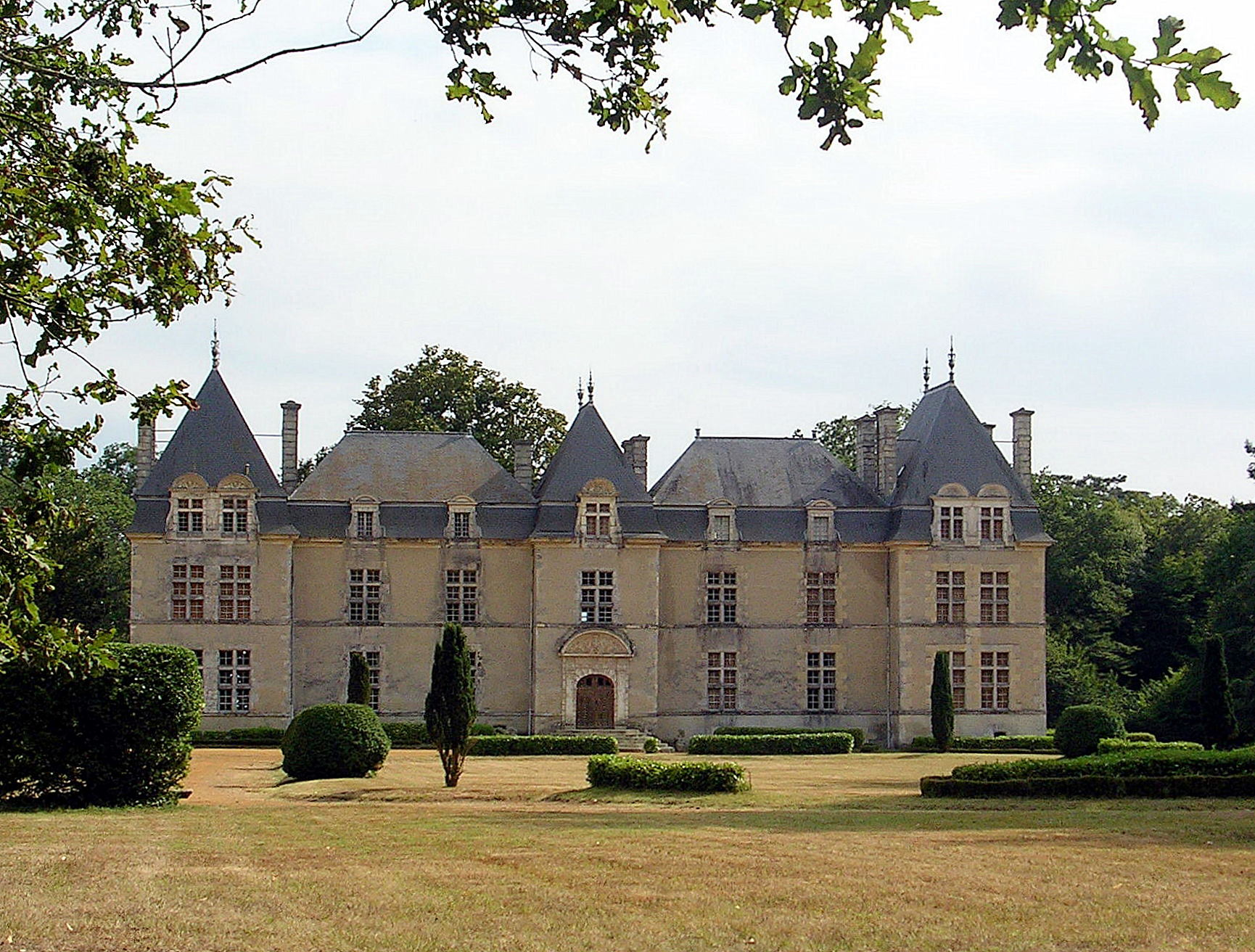
- Château de Ravignan
- Location of Perquie
- Location within France Location within Nouvelle-Aquitaine
- Coordinates: 43°52′42″N 0°16′58″W
- Country: France
- Region: Nouvelle-Aquitaine
- Department: Landes
- Arrondissement: Mont-de-Marsan
- Canton: Adour Armagnac
- Intercommunality: Pays de Villeneuve en Armagnac Landais

Government
  - Mayor (2020–2026): Jean-Yves Arrestat
- Area^{1}: 26.34 km^{2} (10.17 sq mi)
- Elevation: 89 m (292 ft)
- Highest elevation: 121 m (397 ft)
- Lowest elevation: 58 m (190 ft)
- Population (2023): 342
  - Density: 13.0/km^{2} (33.6/sq mi)
- Time zone: UTC+01:00 (CET)
  - Summer (DST): UTC+02:00 (CEST)
- INSEE/Postal code: 40221 /40190
- ^{1} French Land Register data, which excludes lakes, ponds, glaciers > 1 km^{2} (0.386 sq mi or 247 acres) and river estuaries.

Perquie (French pronunciation: [pɛʁki]; Occitan: Perquia) is a commune, a small town located in the Landes department in Nouvelle-Aquitaine (the Aquitaine region) in southwestern France.

== Population ==
Historical population
| Year | Pop. | ±% p.a. |
|---|---|---|
| 1968 | 389 | — |
| 1975 | 343 | −1.78% |
| 1982 | 332 | −0.46% |
| 1990 | 294 | −1.51% |
| 1999 | 297 | +0.11% |
| 2007 | 370 | +2.79% |
| 2012 | 364 | −0.33% |
| 2017 | 350 | −0.78% |
| 2023 | 342 | −0.38% |
Source: INSEE

The inhabitants of Perquie are called Perquois and Perquoises in French. The present mayor of Perquie is Jean-Yves Arrestat.

== Geography ==
The neighboring towns are Villeneuve-de-Marsan at 2.4 km, Arthez-d'Armagnac at 3.0 km, Saint-Gein at 4.8 km, Pujo-le-Plan at 4.5 km, Hontanx at 6.0 km. The nearest large town of Perquie is Mont-de-Marsan and is 18 kilometers south as the crow flies. The nearest train station to Perquie is in Mont-de-Marsan (18 kilometers). The area of the commune is 26.34 km^{2} (10.17 sq mi), and its elevation is between 58 and 121 m.

== Attractions ==
The castle of Ravignan is a Louis XIII style residence, located in the commune of Perquie. The structure is surrounded by formal gardens and woodlands. The present building was constructed on the ruins of a medieval castle in 1663. It has been designated as a 'monument historique' by the French Ministry of Culture. The château's cellars have produced Armagnac brandy for more than three centuries. Inside the building is listed on the Historical Monuments, furniture, and antique objects, costumes of the eighteenth century, as well as a collection of drawings and engravings representing Henry IV.

== Economy ==
The number of people at the age of 15 to 64 years old in 2020 was 178 (men and women), of which 78% were active and 22% were inactive. The unemployment rate was 5%.

== See also ==
- Communes of the Landes department
