= Hontanx =

- Commune
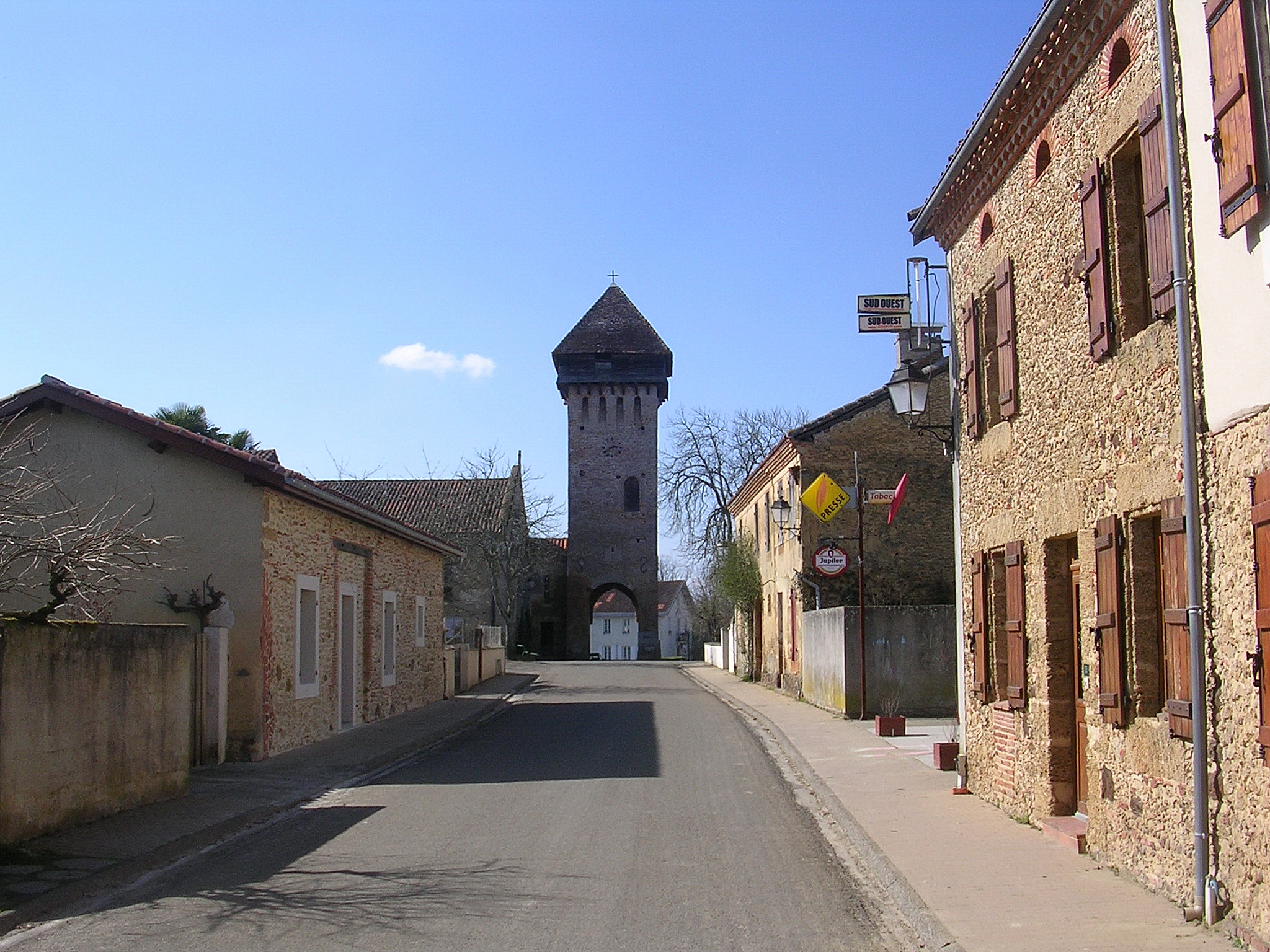
- Location of Hontanx
- Location within France Location within Nouvelle-Aquitaine
- Coordinates: 43°49′32″N 0°16′21″W
- Country: France
- Region: Nouvelle-Aquitaine
- Department: Landes
- Arrondissement: Mont-de-Marsan
- Canton: Adour Armagnac
- Intercommunality: Pays de Villeneuve en Armagnac Landais

Government
  - Mayor (2020–2026): Jean-Louis Dejean
- Area^{1}: 30.48 km^{2} (11.77 sq mi)
- Elevation: 50 m (160 ft)
- Highest elevation: 137 m (449 ft)
- Lowest elevation: 77 m (253 ft)
- Population (2023): 608
  - Density: 19.9/km^{2} (51.7/sq mi)
- Time zone: UTC+01:00 (CET)
  - Summer (DST): UTC+02:00 (CEST)
- INSEE/Postal code: 40127 /40190
- ^{1} French Land Register data, which excludes lakes, ponds, glaciers > 1 km^{2} (0.386 sq mi or 247 acres) and river estuaries.

Hontanx (French pronunciation: [ɔ̃tɑ̃ks]; Occitan: Hontans) is a commune in the Landes department in Nouvelle-Aquitaine in southwestern France.

== Population ==
Historical population
Year	Pop.	±% p.a.
1968	582	—
1975	501	−2.12%
1982	504	+0.09%
1990	513	+0.22%
1999	533	+0.43%
2007	558	+0.57%
2012	537	−0.76%
2017	603	+2.35%
2023	608	+0.14%
Source: INSEE

== See also ==
- Communes of the Landes department
