= Grenade-sur-l'Adour =

- Commune
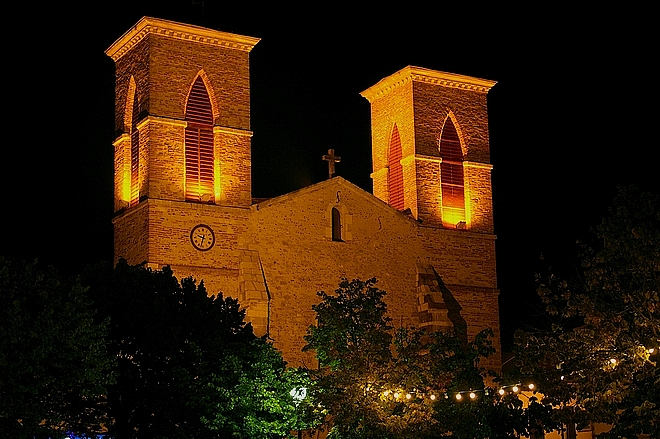
- Church of Grenade-sur-l'Adour

- Coat of arms
- Location of Grenade-sur-l'Adour
- Location within France Location within Nouvelle-Aquitaine
- Coordinates: 43°46′37″N 0°25′42″W
- Country: France
- Region: Nouvelle-Aquitaine
- Department: Landes
- Arrondissement: Mont-de-Marsan
- Canton: Adour Armagnac
- Intercommunality: Pays Grenadois

Government
  - Mayor (2020–2026): Odile Lacouture
- Area^{1}: 19.72 km^{2} (7.61 sq mi)
- Elevation: 55 m (180 ft)
- Highest elevation: 84 m (276 ft)
- Lowest elevation: 48 m (157 ft)
- Population (2023): 2,398
  - Density: 121.6/km^{2} (314.9/sq mi)
- Time zone: UTC+01:00 (CET)
  - Summer (DST): UTC+02:00 (CEST)
- INSEE/Postal code: 40117 /40270
- ^{1} French Land Register data, which excludes lakes, ponds, glaciers > 1 km^{2} (0.386 sq mi or 247 acres) and river estuaries.

Grenade-sur-l'Adour (French pronunciation: [ɡʁənad syʁ laduʁ], literally Grenade on the Adour; Occitan: Granada d'Ador, before 1962: Grenade) is a commune in the Landes department in Nouvelle-Aquitaine in southwestern France.

== Geography ==
The town is located between two larger towns of Aire-sur-l'Adour and Mont-de-Marsan.

== Population ==
Historical population

Year	Pop.	±% p.a.
1793	2,250	—
1821	1,729	−0.94%
1846	1,497	−0.57%
1872	1,658	+0.39%
1901	1,337	−0.74%
1926	1,169	−0.54%
1946	1,179	+0.04%
1962	1,369	+0.94%
1968	2,046	+6.93%

Year	Pop.	±% p.a.
1975	2,006	−0.28%
1982	2,129	+0.85%
1990	2,187	+0.34%
1999	2,265	+0.39%
2007	2,445	+0.96%
2012	2,505	+0.49%
2017	2,487	−0.14%
2023	2,398	−0.61%

Source: EHESS and INSEE (1968-2023)

== Sights ==
Areas of interest include a 15th-century bastide and a Catholic church of the same era.

== See also ==
- Communes of the Landes department
