= Sainte-Foy, Landes =

Sainte-Foy
- Commune
- Coat of arms
- Location of Sainte-Foy
- Location within France Location within Nouvelle-Aquitaine
- Coordinates: 43°56′17″N 0°19′52″W
- Country: France
- Region: Nouvelle-Aquitaine
- Department: Landes
- Arrondissement: Mont-de-Marsan
- Canton: Adour Armagnac
- Intercommunality: Pays de Villeneuve en Armagnac Landais

Government
  - Mayor (2020–2026): Didier Pauliat
- Area^{1}: 9.1 km^{2} (3.5 sq mi)
- Elevation: 84 m (276 ft)
- Highest elevation: 102 m (335 ft)
- Lowest elevation: 63 m (207 ft)
- Population (2023): 251
  - Density: 28/km^{2} (71/sq mi)
- Time zone: UTC+01:00 (CET)
  - Summer (DST): UTC+02:00 (CEST)
- INSEE/Postal code: 40258 /40190
- ^{1} French Land Register data, which excludes lakes, ponds, glaciers > 1 km^{2} (0.386 sq mi or 247 acres) and river estuaries.

Sainte-Foy (French pronunciation: [sɛ̃t fwa]; Occitan: Senta He) is a commune in the Landes department in Nouvelle-Aquitaine in southwestern France.

== Population ==
Historical population
| Year | Pop. | ±% p.a. |
|---|---|---|
| 1968 | 106 | — |
| 1975 | 83 | −3.43% |
| 1982 | 99 | +2.55% |
| 1990 | 131 | +3.56% |
| 1999 | 138 | +0.58% |
| 2007 | 221 | +6.06% |
| 2012 | 278 | +4.70% |
| 2017 | 253 | −1.87% |
| 2023 | 251 | −0.13% |
Source: INSEE

== See also ==
- Communes of the Landes department
