= Bordères-et-Lamensans =

- Commune
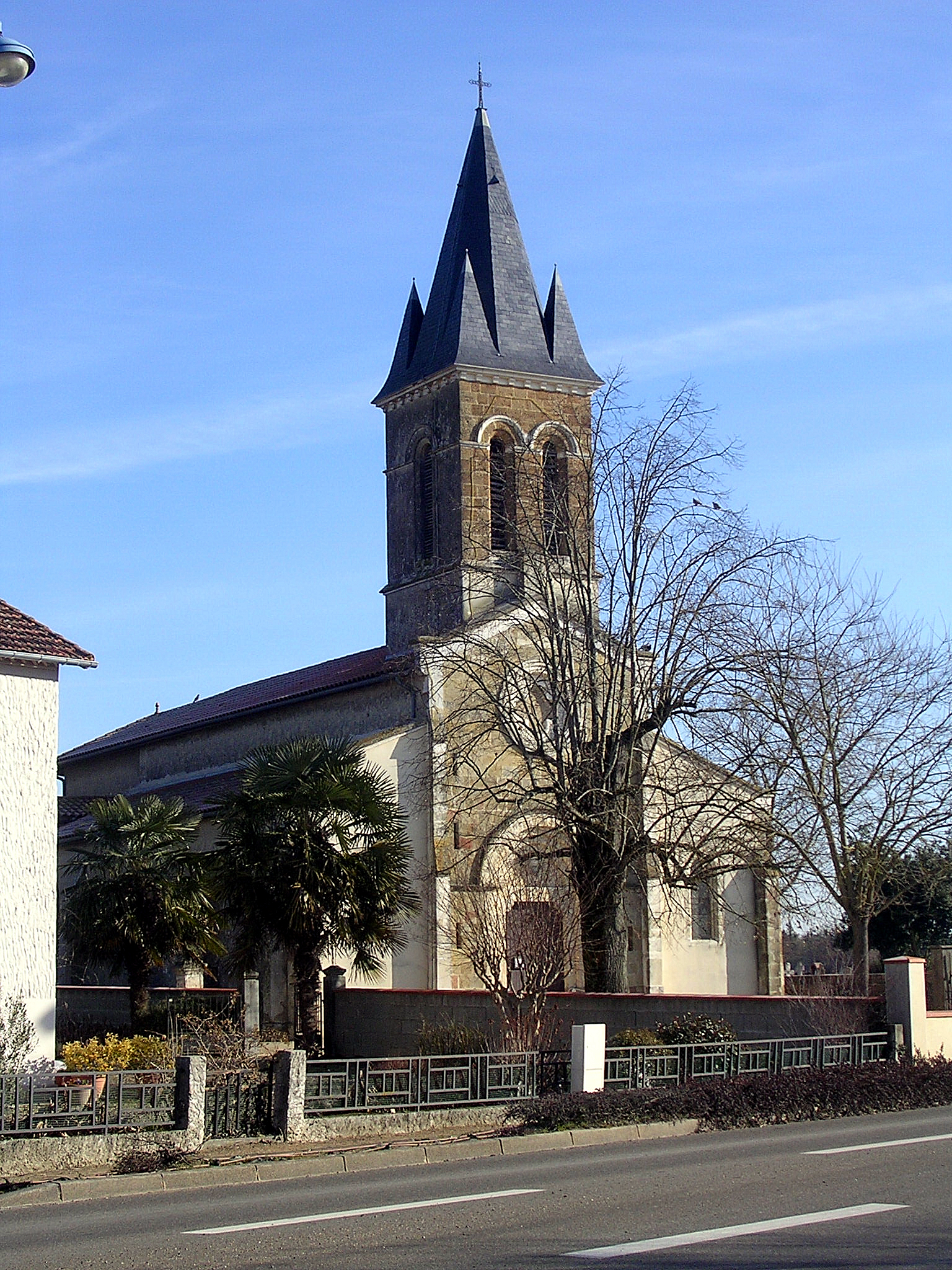
- Location of Bordères-et-Lamensans
- Location within France Location within Nouvelle-Aquitaine
- Coordinates: 43°46′26″N 0°21′46″W
- Country: France
- Region: Nouvelle-Aquitaine
- Department: Landes
- Arrondissement: Mont-de-Marsan
- Canton: Adour Armagnac

Government
  - Mayor (2020–2026): Philippe Ogé
- Area^{1}: 15.6 km^{2} (6.0 sq mi)
- Elevation: 70 m (230 ft)
- Highest elevation: 90 m (300 ft)
- Lowest elevation: 52 m (171 ft)
- Population (2023): 359
  - Density: 23.0/km^{2} (59.6/sq mi)
- Time zone: UTC+01:00 (CET)
  - Summer (DST): UTC+02:00 (CEST)
- INSEE/Postal code: 40049 /40270
- ^{1} French Land Register data, which excludes lakes, ponds, glaciers > 1 km^{2} (0.386 sq mi or 247 acres) and river estuaries.

Bordères-et-Lamensans (Occitan: Fròntièrias e Lamensans) is a commune in the Landes department in Nouvelle-Aquitaine in southwestern France.

== Population ==
Historical population
Year	Pop.	±% p.a.
1968	351	—
1975	313	−1.62%
1982	291	−1.04%
1990	331	+1.62%
1999	344	+0.43%
2007	342	−0.07%
2012	346	+0.23%
2017	369	+1.30%
2023	359	−0.46%
Source: INSEE

== See also ==
- Communes of the Landes department
