= Bascons =

- Commune
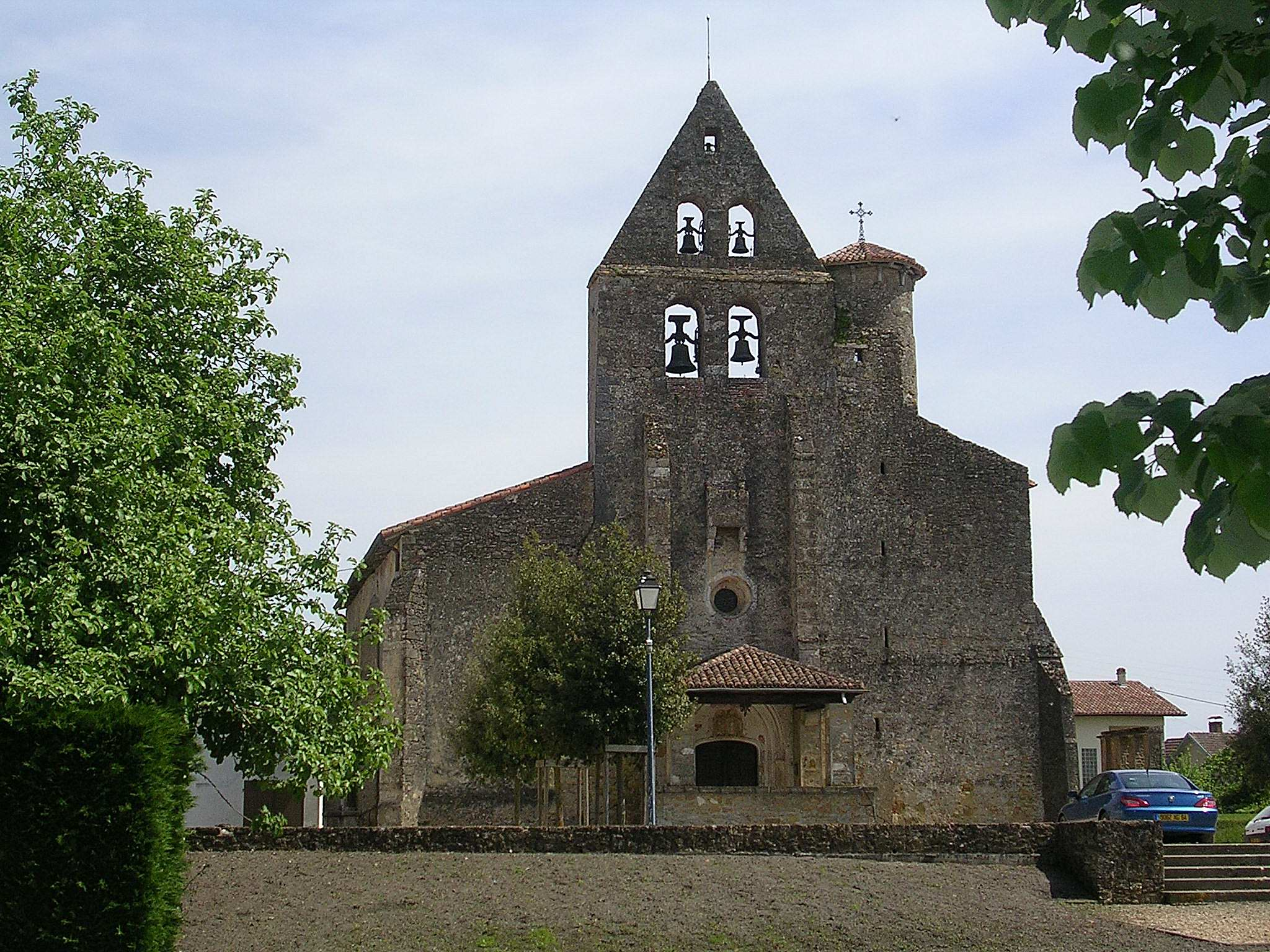
- The church of Bascons

- Coat of arms
- Location of Bascons
- Location within France Location within Nouvelle-Aquitaine
- Coordinates: 43°49′21″N 0°25′03″W
- Country: France
- Region: Nouvelle-Aquitaine
- Department: Landes
- Arrondissement: Mont-de-Marsan
- Canton: Adour Armagnac
- Intercommunality: Pays Grenadois

Government
  - Mayor (2020–2026): Nicolas Raulin
- Area^{1}: 18.7 km^{2} (7.2 sq mi)
- Elevation: 90 m (300 ft)
- Highest elevation: 107 m (351 ft)
- Lowest elevation: 66 m (217 ft)
- Population (2023): 855
  - Density: 45.7/km^{2} (118/sq mi)
- Time zone: UTC+01:00 (CET)
  - Summer (DST): UTC+02:00 (CEST)
- INSEE/Postal code: 40025 /40090
- ^{1} French Land Register data, which excludes lakes, ponds, glaciers > 1 km^{2} (0.386 sq mi or 247 acres) and river estuaries.

Bascons is a commune in the Landes department in Nouvelle-Aquitaine in southwestern France.

== History ==
The Vascons settled in Aquitaine in the 6th century. It is likely that the village of Bascons owes its name to them. According to legend, Saint Amand, a Merovingian evangelist, performed miracles around 670, which led to the construction of a chapel near a well that attracted pilgrims seeking its healing waters. During the Middle Ages, Bascons served as the seat of the cour dels Sers, a court of justice for the Viscounty of Marsan, and the reputation of the fortified castle grew stronger. The Hundred Years' War and the Wars of Religion took a toll on the small town, causing it to lose its significance.

== Population ==
Historical population
Year	Pop.	±% p.a.
1968	620	—
1975	608	−0.28%
1982	673	+1.46%
1990	823	+2.55%
1999	867	+0.58%
2007	940	+1.02%
2012	897	−0.93%
2017	845	−1.19%
2023	855	+0.20%
Source: INSEE

== Twinning ==
Bartenheim (France), in memory of the Alsatian civilians who found refuge in the Landes village at the beginning of World War II.

== Gallery ==
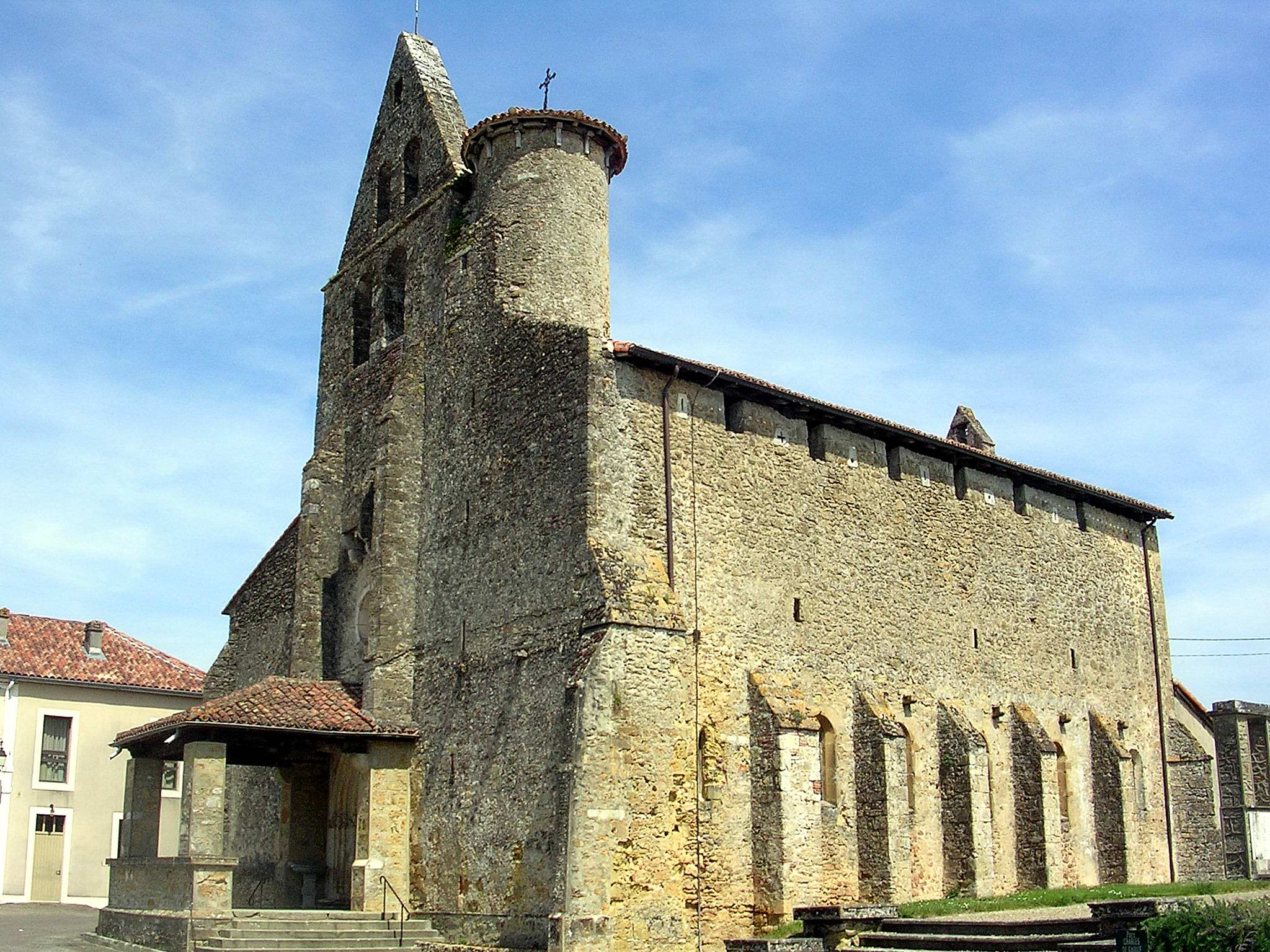
Saint-Amand Church (1626).

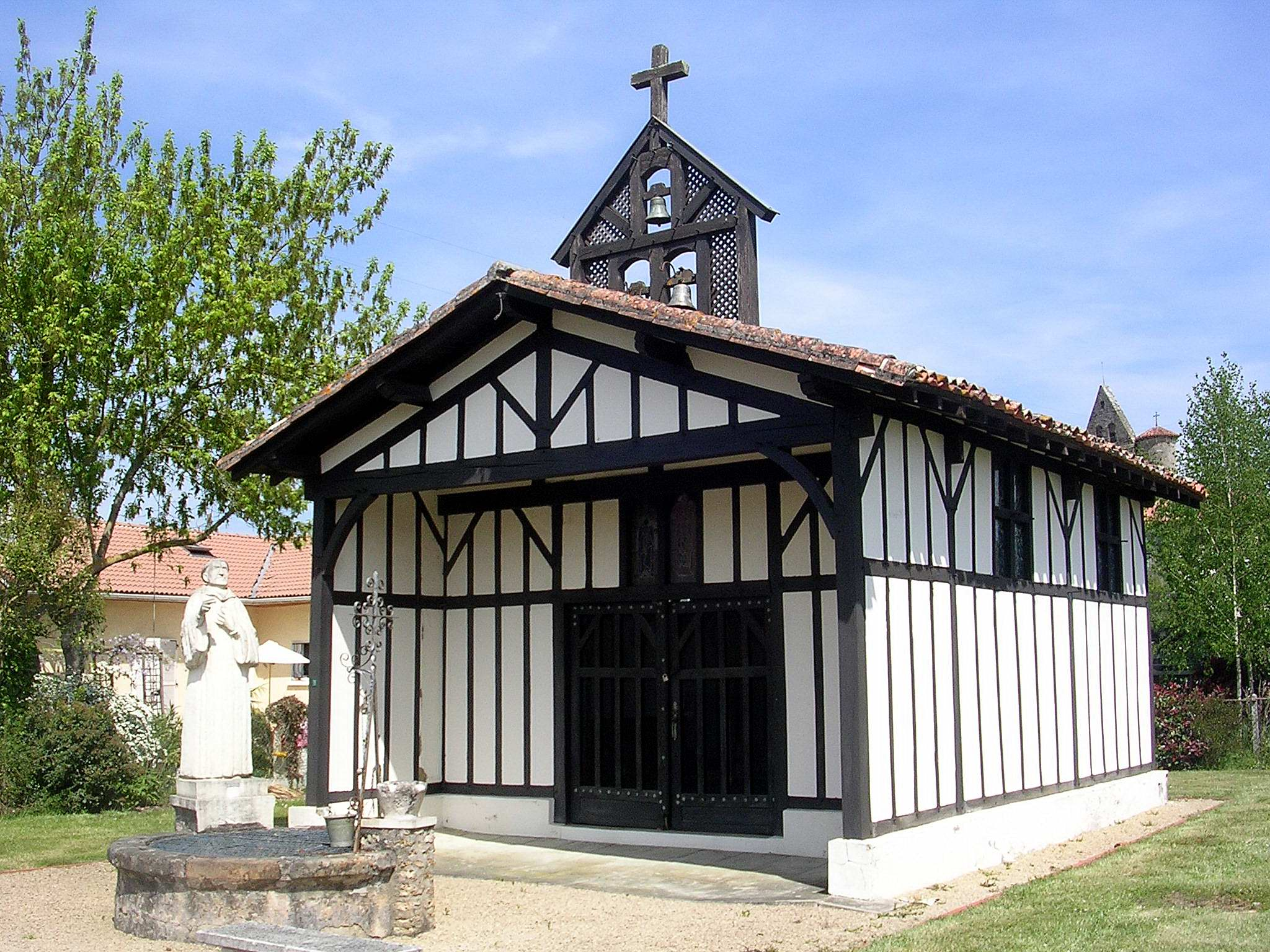
Chapel of Saint-Amand (1946).

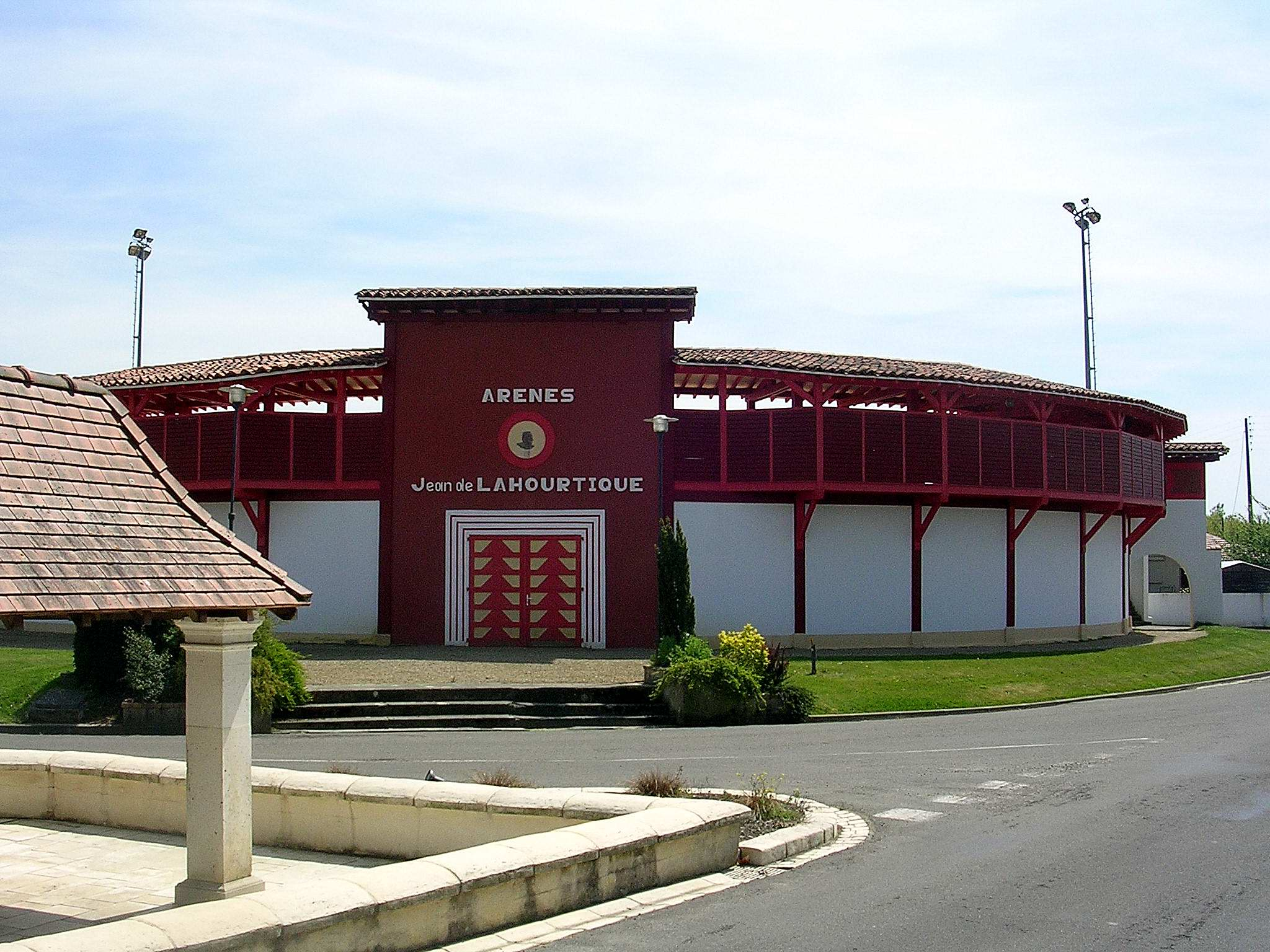
Jean-de-Lahourtique Arena (1935).

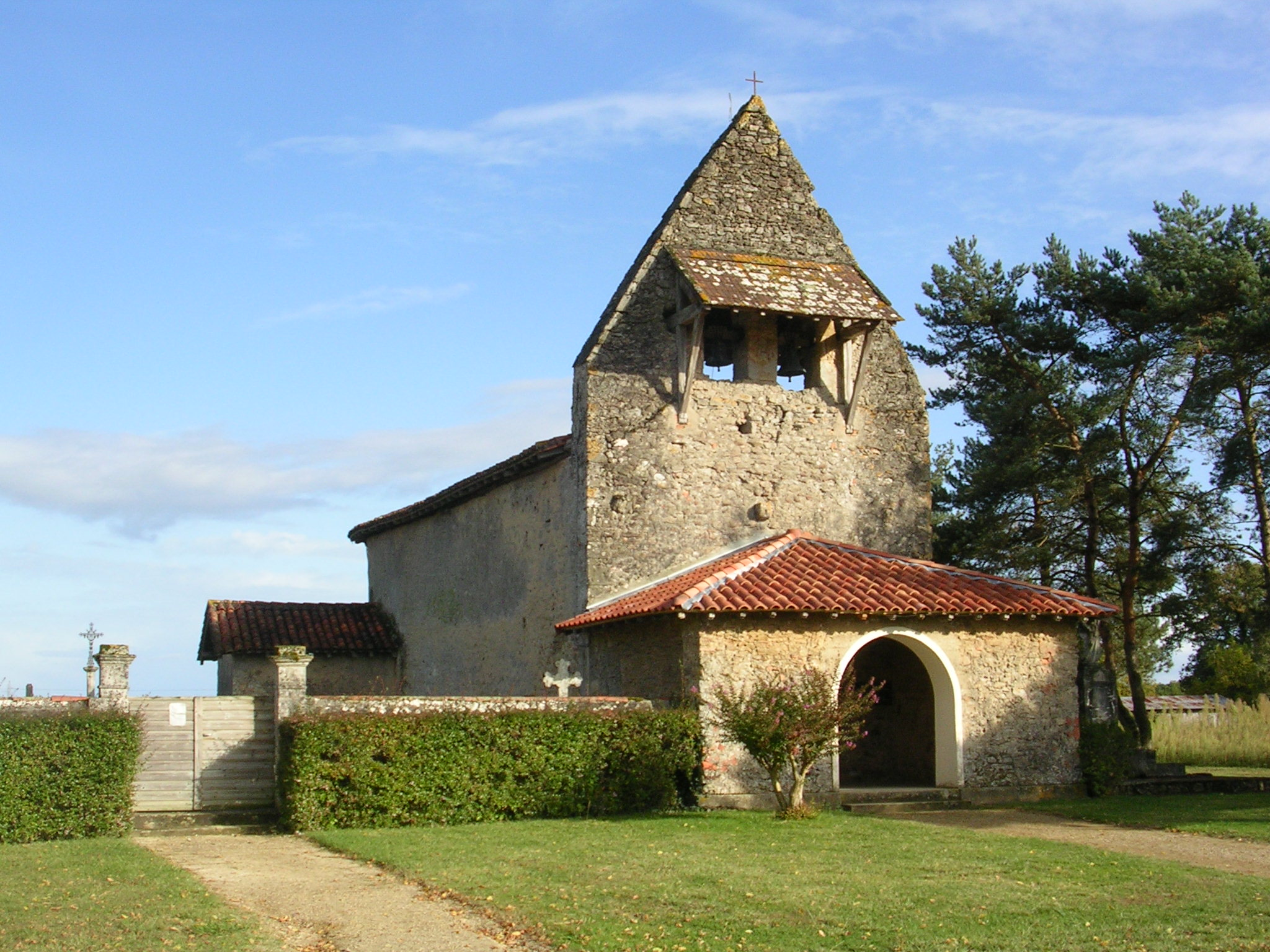
Chapel of Notre-Dame-de-la-Course-Landaise (15th century).

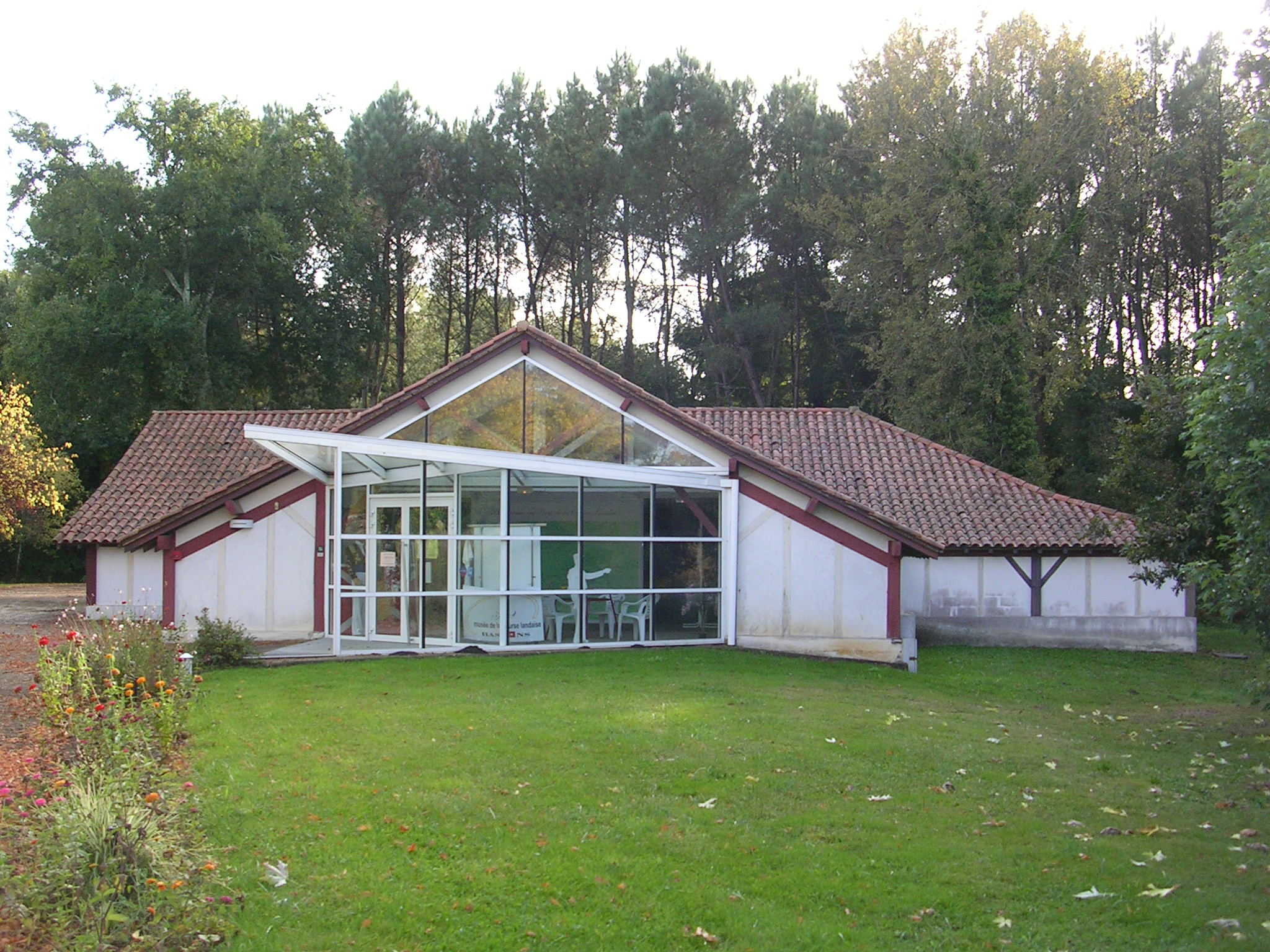
Course Landaise Museum (1973).

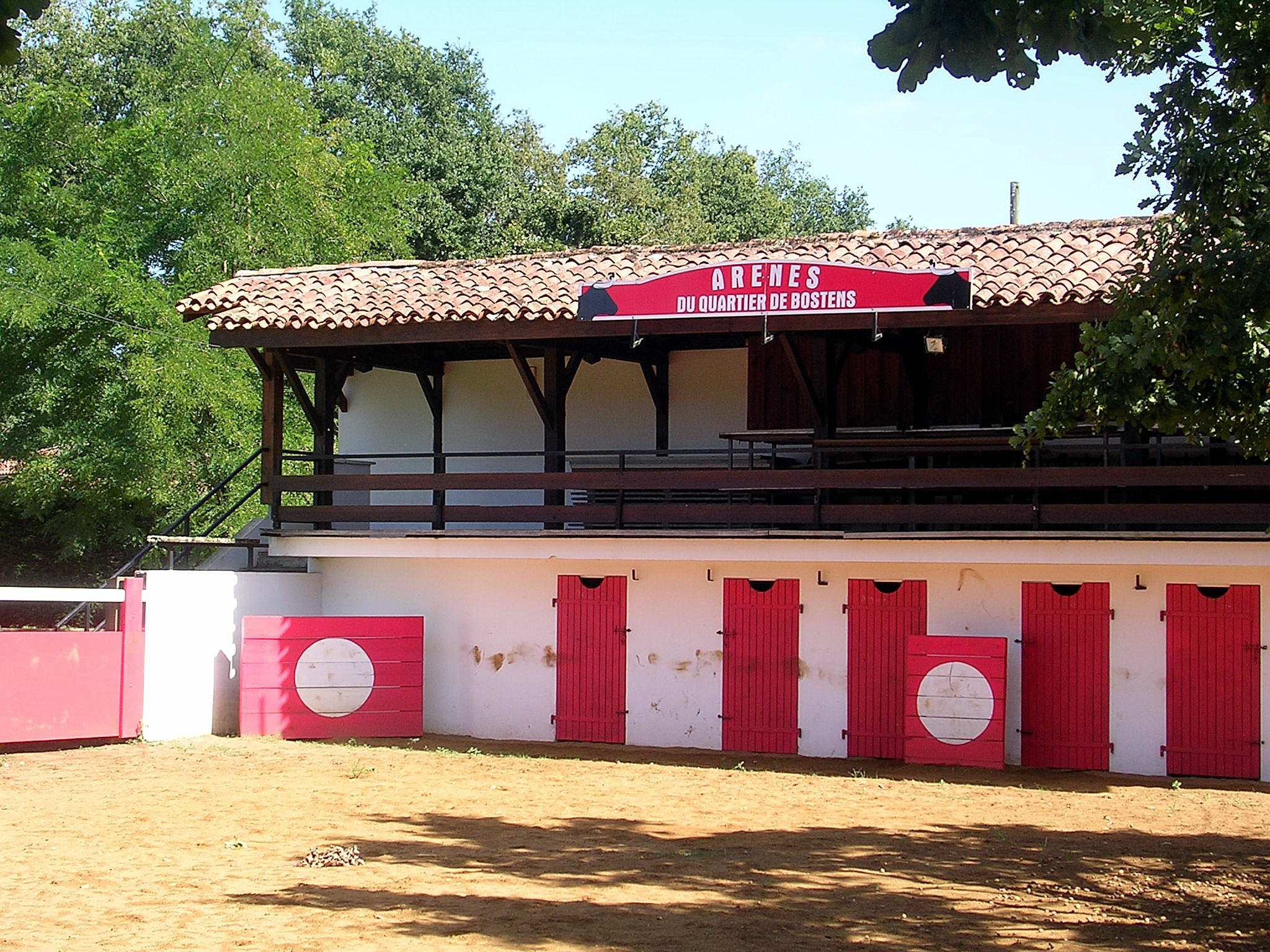
Bostens district arenas.

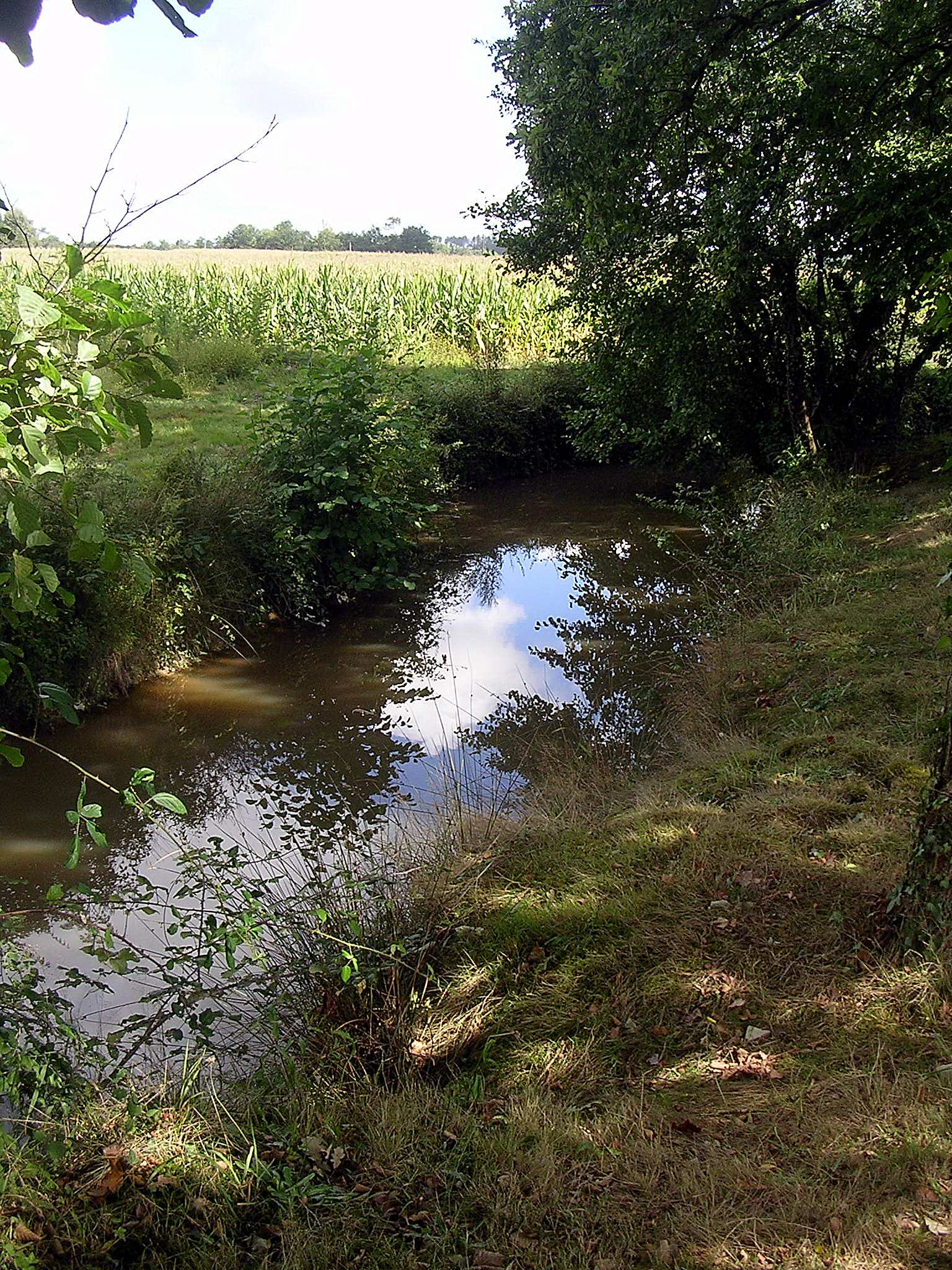
The Longs stream in Bascons.

=== See also ===
- Communes of the Landes department
