= Montégut, Landes =

Montégut
- Commune
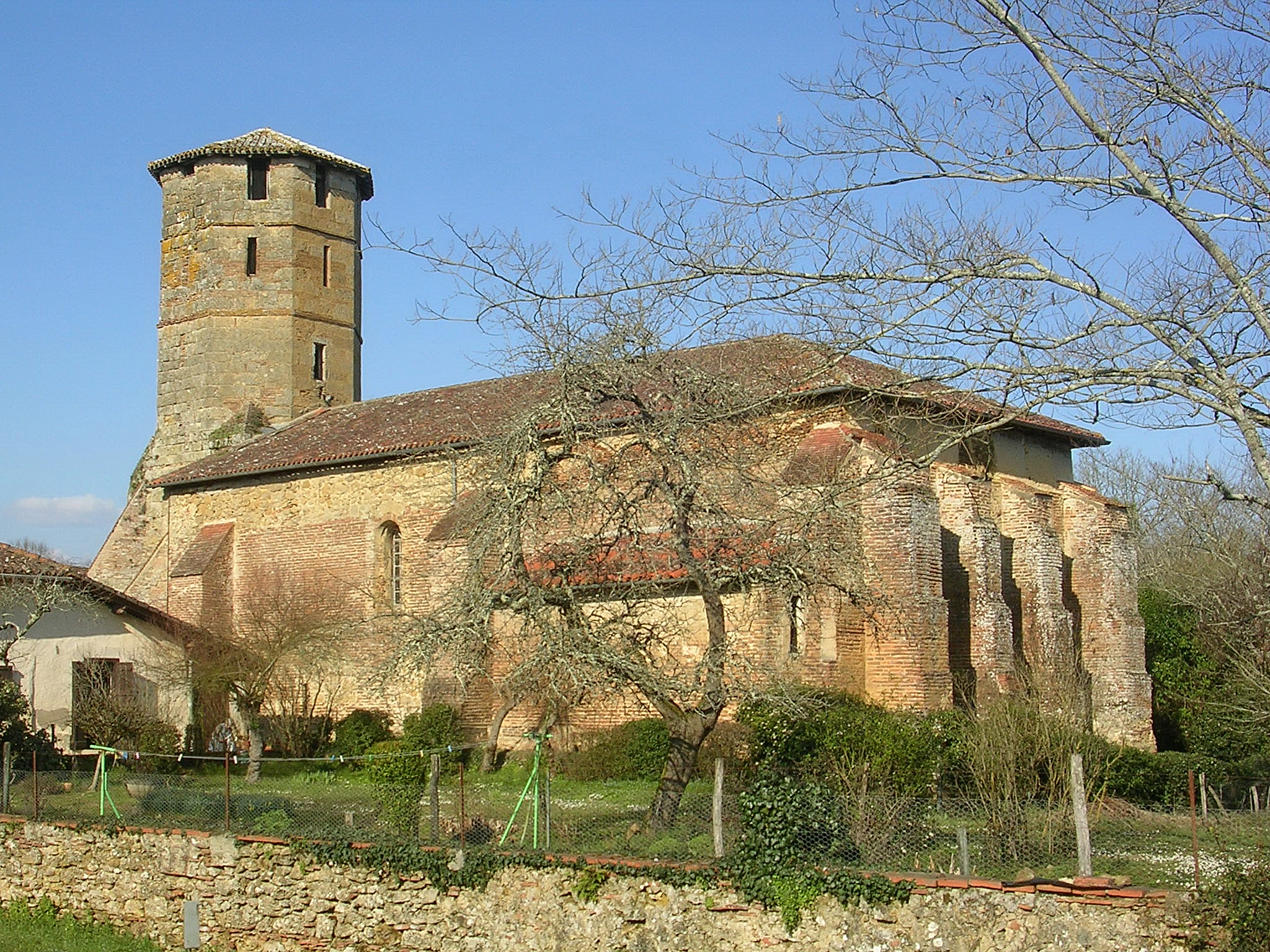
- Church of Saint-Laurent
- Location of Montégut
- Location within France Location within Nouvelle-Aquitaine
- Coordinates: 43°52′34″N 0°11′52″W
- Country: France
- Region: Nouvelle-Aquitaine
- Department: Landes
- Arrondissement: Mont-de-Marsan
- Canton: Adour Armagnac
- Intercommunality: Pays de Villeneuve en Armagnac Landais

Government
  - Mayor (2022–2026): Christine Branco
- Area^{1}: 4.82 km^{2} (1.86 sq mi)
- Elevation: 35 m (115 ft)
- Highest elevation: 110 m (360 ft)
- Lowest elevation: 63 m (207 ft)
- Population (2023): 79
  - Density: 16/km^{2} (42/sq mi)
- Time zone: UTC+01:00 (CET)
  - Summer (DST): UTC+02:00 (CEST)
- INSEE/Postal code: 40193 /40190
- ^{1} French Land Register data, which excludes lakes, ponds, glaciers > 1 km^{2} (0.386 sq mi or 247 acres) and river estuaries.

Montégut (French pronunciation: [mɔ̃teɡy]; Occitan: Montagut) is a commune in the Landes department in Nouvelle-Aquitaine in southwestern France.

== Population ==
Historical population
Year	Pop.	±% p.a.
1968	106	—
1975	89	−2.47%
1982	91	+0.32%
1990	79	−1.75%
1999	81	+0.28%
2007	71	−1.63%
2012	73	+0.56%
2017	71	−0.55%
2023	79	+1.80%
Source: INSEE

== See also ==
- Communes of the Landes department
