= Sarron =

- Commune
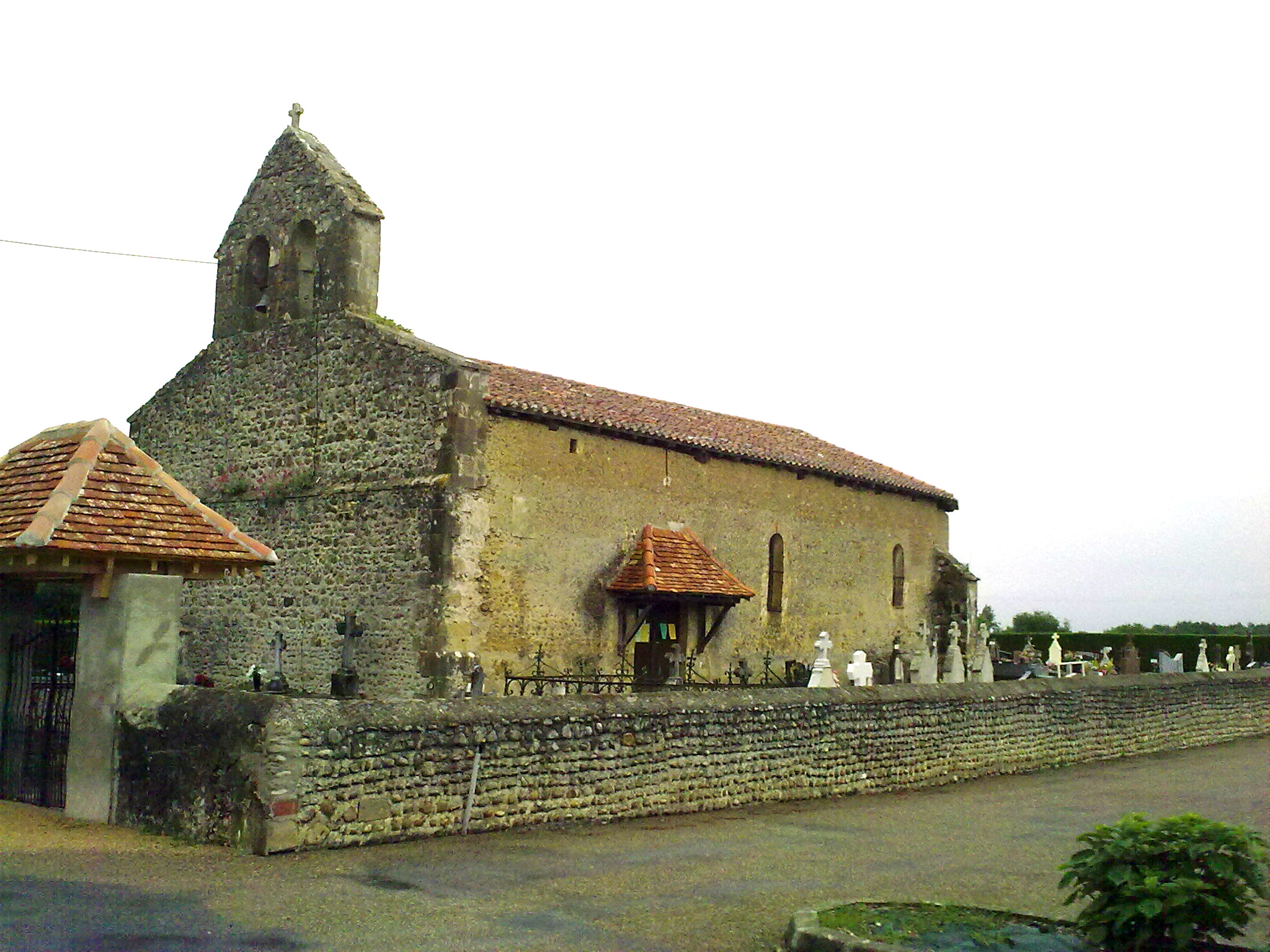
- Location of Sarron
- Location within France Location within Nouvelle-Aquitaine
- Coordinates: 43°35′34″N 0°16′25″W
- Country: France
- Region: Nouvelle-Aquitaine
- Department: Landes
- Arrondissement: Mont-de-Marsan
- Canton: Adour Armagnac
- Intercommunality: Aire-sur-l'Adour

Government
  - Mayor (2020–2026): Marie-Line Daugreilh
- Area^{1}: 3.9 km^{2} (1.5 sq mi)
- Elevation: 194 m (636 ft)
- Highest elevation: 199 m (653 ft)
- Lowest elevation: 107 m (351 ft)
- Population (2023): 104
  - Density: 27/km^{2} (69/sq mi)
- Time zone: UTC+01:00 (CET)
  - Summer (DST): UTC+02:00 (CEST)
- INSEE/Postal code: 40290 /40800
- ^{1} French Land Register data, which excludes lakes, ponds, glaciers > 1 km^{2} (0.386 sq mi or 247 acres) and river estuaries.

Sarron (French pronunciation: [saʁɔ̃]) is a commune in the Landes department in Nouvelle-Aquitaine in southwestern France.

== Population ==
Historical population
Year	Pop.	±% p.a.
1968	75	—
1975	82	+1.28%
1982	97	+2.43%
1990	92	−0.66%
1999	87	−0.62%
2007	99	+1.63%
2012	130	+5.60%
2017	110	−3.29%
2023	104	−0.93%
Source: INSEE

== See also ==
- Communes of the Landes department
