= Maurrin =

- Commune
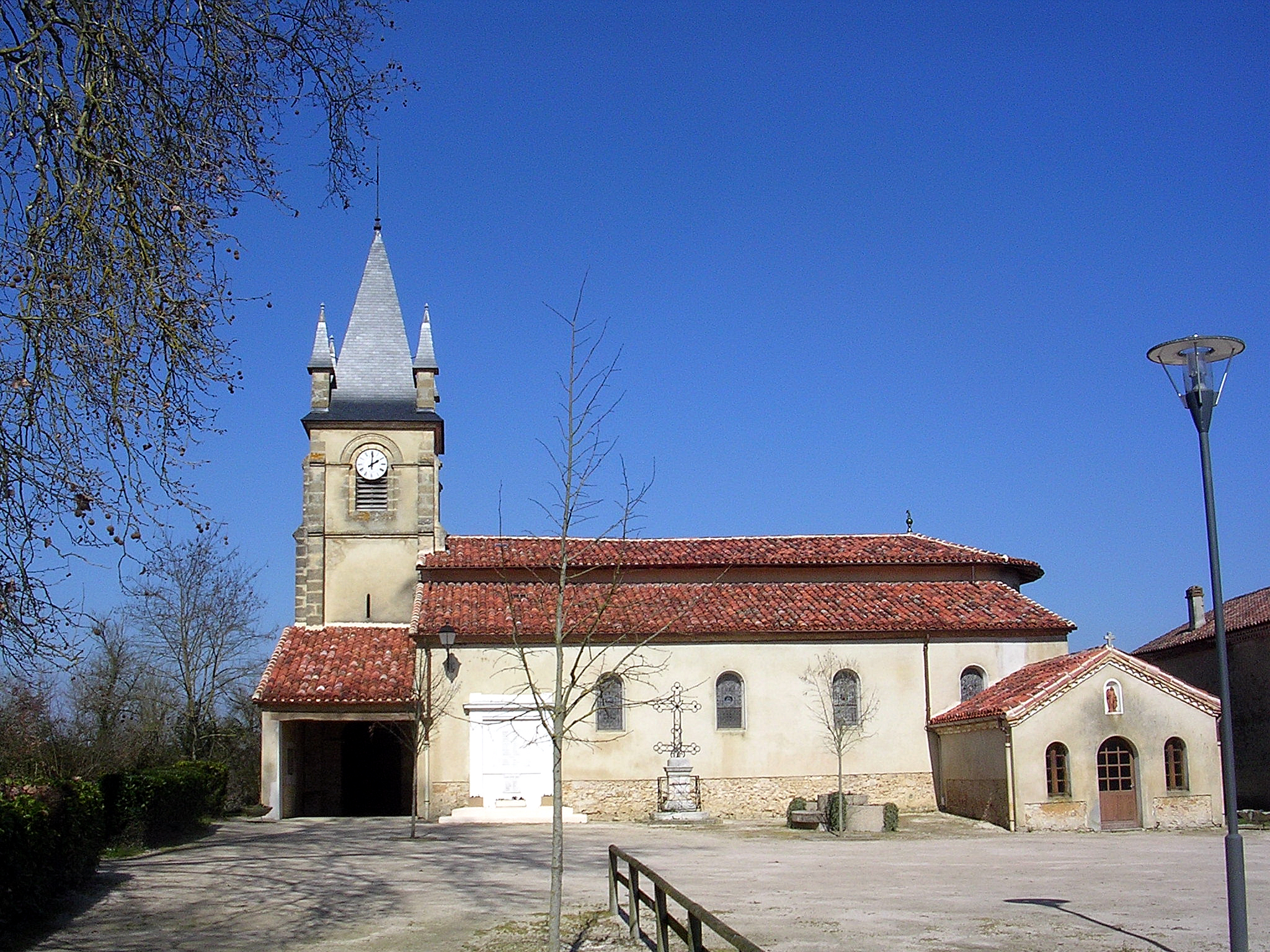
- The church in Maurrin
- Location of Maurrin
- Location within France Location within Nouvelle-Aquitaine
- Coordinates: 43°49′32″N 0°22′17″W
- Country: France
- Region: Nouvelle-Aquitaine
- Department: Landes
- Arrondissement: Mont-de-Marsan
- Canton: Adour Armagnac
- Intercommunality: Pays Grenadois

Government
  - Mayor (2020–2026): Jean-Luc Lafenêtre
- Area^{1}: 13.38 km^{2} (5.17 sq mi)
- Elevation: 100 m (330 ft)
- Highest elevation: 121 m (397 ft)
- Lowest elevation: 67 m (220 ft)
- Population (2023): 467
  - Density: 34.9/km^{2} (90.4/sq mi)
- Time zone: UTC+01:00 (CET)
  - Summer (DST): UTC+02:00 (CEST)
- INSEE/Postal code: 40175 /40270
- ^{1} French Land Register data, which excludes lakes, ponds, glaciers > 1 km^{2} (0.386 sq mi or 247 acres) and river estuaries.

Maurrin (French pronunciation: [moʁɛ̃]; Occitan: Maurin) is a commune in the Landes department in Nouvelle-Aquitaine in south-western France.

== See also ==
- Communes of the Landes department
