= Lussagnet =

- Commune
- Coat of arms
- Location of Lussagnet
- Location within France Location within Nouvelle-Aquitaine
- Coordinates: 43°46′34″N 0°13′58″W
- Country: France
- Region: Nouvelle-Aquitaine
- Department: Landes
- Arrondissement: Mont-de-Marsan
- Canton: Adour Armagnac
- Intercommunality: Pays Grenadois

Government
  - Mayor (2020–2026): Jean-Claude Lafite
- Area^{1}: 8.43 km^{2} (3.25 sq mi)
- Elevation: 130 m (430 ft)
- Highest elevation: 141 m (463 ft)
- Lowest elevation: 87 m (285 ft)
- Population (2023): 80
  - Density: 9.5/km^{2} (25/sq mi)
- Time zone: UTC+01:00 (CET)
  - Summer (DST): UTC+02:00 (CEST)
- INSEE/Postal code: 40166 /40270
- ^{1} French Land Register data, which excludes lakes, ponds, glaciers > 1 km^{2} (0.386 sq mi or 247 acres) and river estuaries.

Lussagnet (French pronunciation: [lysaɲɛ]; Occitan: Lussanhet) is a commune in the Landes department in Nouvelle-Aquitaine in south-western France. It borders the Lac de la Gioule nature reserve.

== See also ==
- Communes of the Landes department
