= Saint-Cricq-Villeneuve =

- Commune
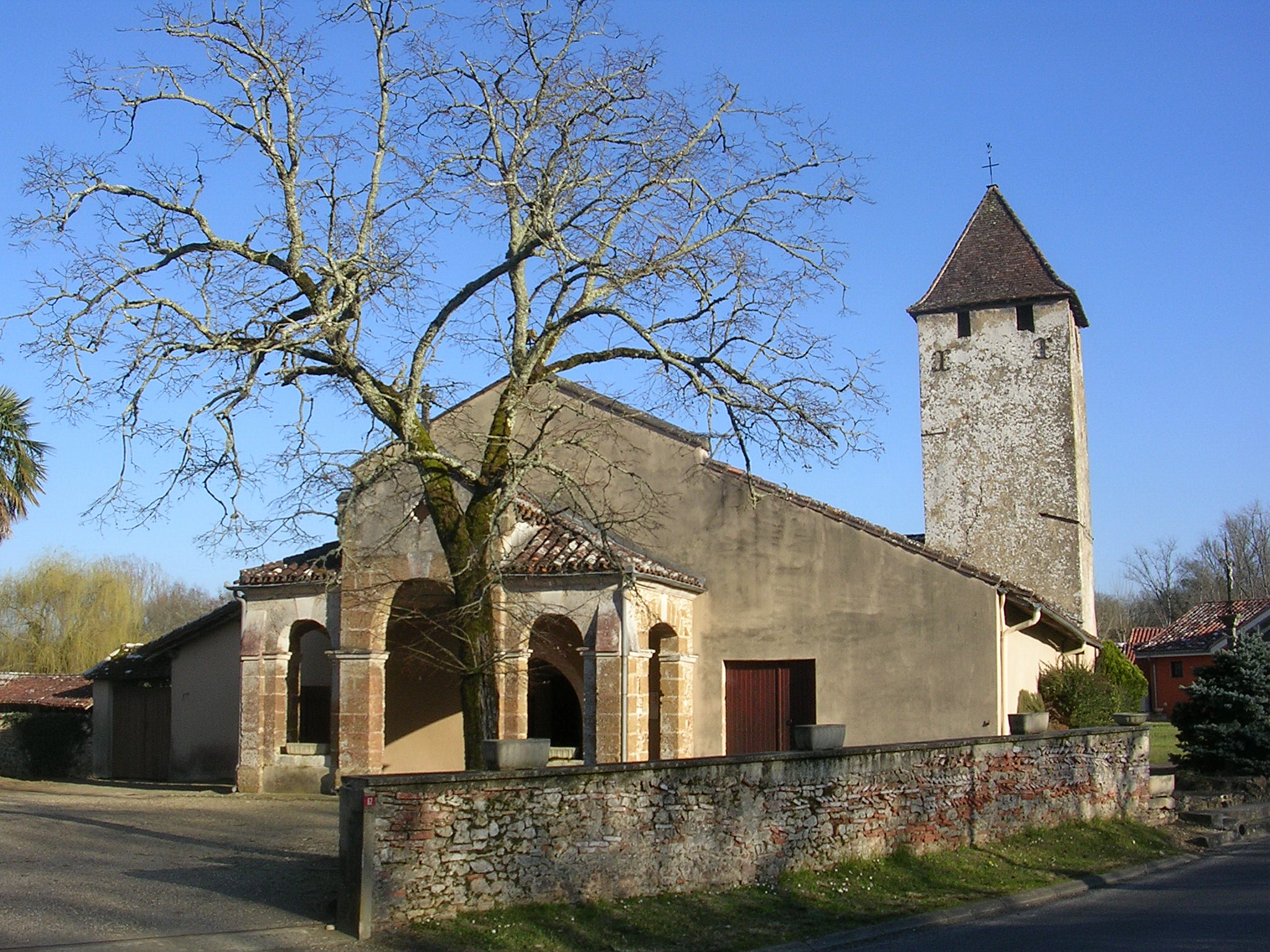

- Coat of arms
- Location of Saint-Cricq-Villeneuve
- Location within France Location within Nouvelle-Aquitaine
- Coordinates: 43°53′31″N 0°21′07″W
- Country: France
- Region: Nouvelle-Aquitaine
- Department: Landes
- Arrondissement: Mont-de-Marsan
- Canton: Adour Armagnac
- Intercommunality: Pays de Villeneuve en Armagnac Landais

Government
  - Mayor (2020–2026): Ghislaine Buclon
- Area^{1}: 15.76 km^{2} (6.08 sq mi)
- Elevation: 55 m (180 ft)
- Highest elevation: 106 m (348 ft)
- Lowest elevation: 39 m (128 ft)
- Population (2023): 472
  - Density: 29.9/km^{2} (77.6/sq mi)
- Time zone: UTC+01:00 (CET)
  - Summer (DST): UTC+02:00 (CEST)
- INSEE/Postal code: 40255 /40190
- ^{1} French Land Register data, which excludes lakes, ponds, glaciers > 1 km^{2} (0.386 sq mi or 247 acres) and river estuaries.

Saint-Cricq-Villeneuve (French pronunciation: [sɛ̃ kʁik vilnœv]; Occitan: Sent Cric-Vilanava) is a commune in the Landes department in Nouvelle-Aquitaine in southwestern France.

== Population ==
Historical population
Year	Pop.	±% p.a.
1968	288	—
1975	290	+0.10%
1982	313	+1.10%
1990	365	+1.94%
1999	406	+1.19%
2007	429	+0.69%
2012	453	+1.09%
2017	482	+1.25%
2023	472	−0.35%
Source: INSEE

== See also ==
- Communes of the Landes department
