= Larrivière-Saint-Savin =

- Commune
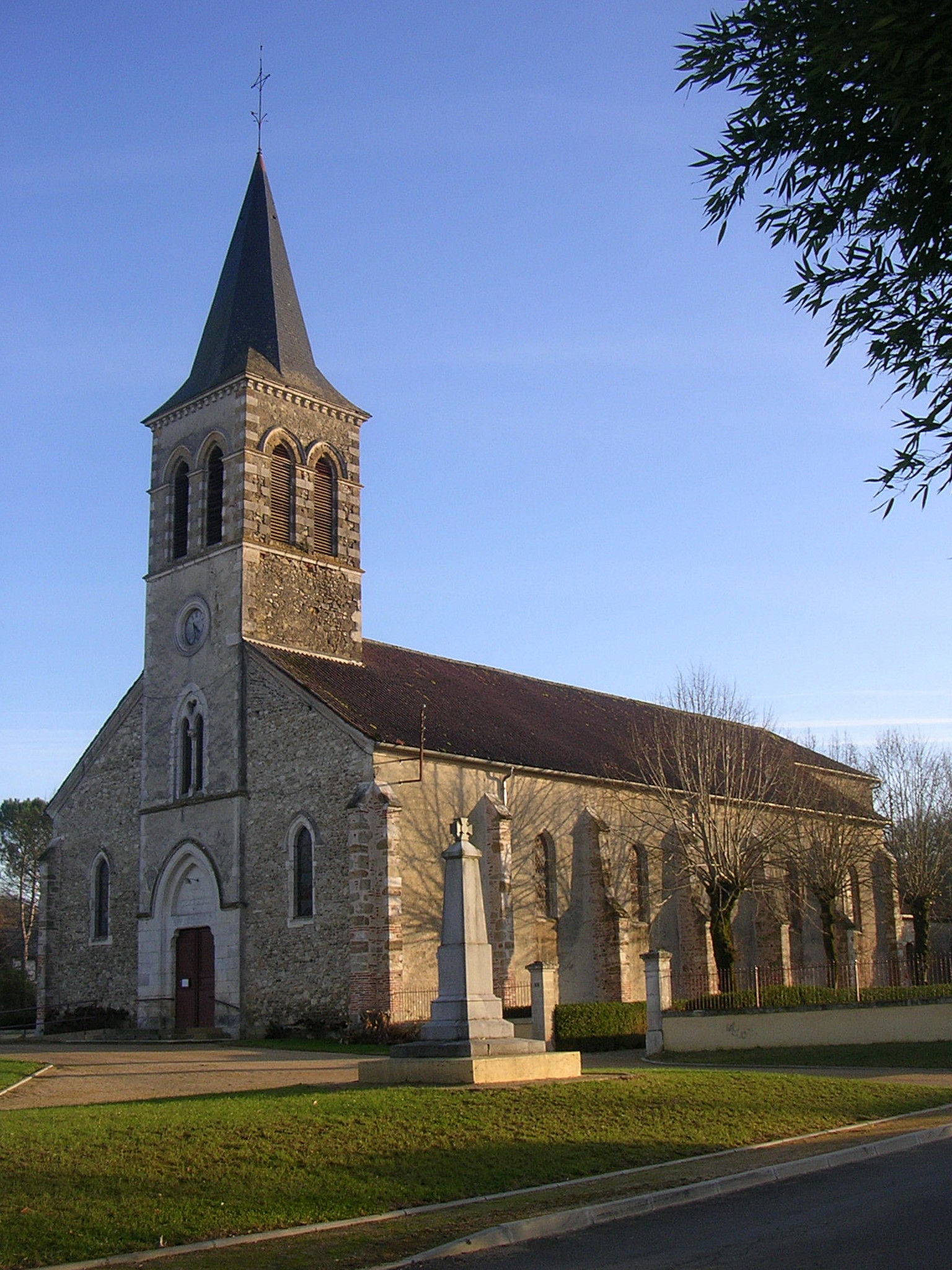
- The church in Larrivière

- Coat of arms
- Location of Larrivière-Saint-Savin
- Location within France Location within Nouvelle-Aquitaine
- Coordinates: 43°46′12″N 0°25′35″W
- Country: France
- Region: Nouvelle-Aquitaine
- Department: Landes
- Arrondissement: Mont-de-Marsan
- Canton: Adour Armagnac
- Intercommunality: Pays Grenadois

Government
  - Mayor (2020–2026): Christophe Larrose
- Area^{1}: 16.85 km^{2} (6.51 sq mi)
- Elevation: 57 m (187 ft)
- Highest elevation: 134 m (440 ft)
- Lowest elevation: 45 m (148 ft)
- Population (2023): 583
  - Density: 34.6/km^{2} (89.6/sq mi)
- Time zone: UTC+01:00 (CET)
  - Summer (DST): UTC+02:00 (CEST)
- INSEE/Postal code: 40145 /40270
- ^{1} French Land Register data, which excludes lakes, ponds, glaciers > 1 km^{2} (0.386 sq mi or 247 acres) and river estuaries.

Larrivière-Saint-Savin (French pronunciation: [laʁivjɛʁ sɛ̃ savɛ̃]; Gascon: L'Arribèra de Sent Savin) is a commune in the Landes department in Nouvelle-Aquitaine in south-western France.

The commune was formerly called Larrivière, and was officially renamed Larrivière-Saint-Savin on 7 July 2006.

== See also ==
- Communes of the Landes department
