= Arthez-d'Armagnac =

- Commune
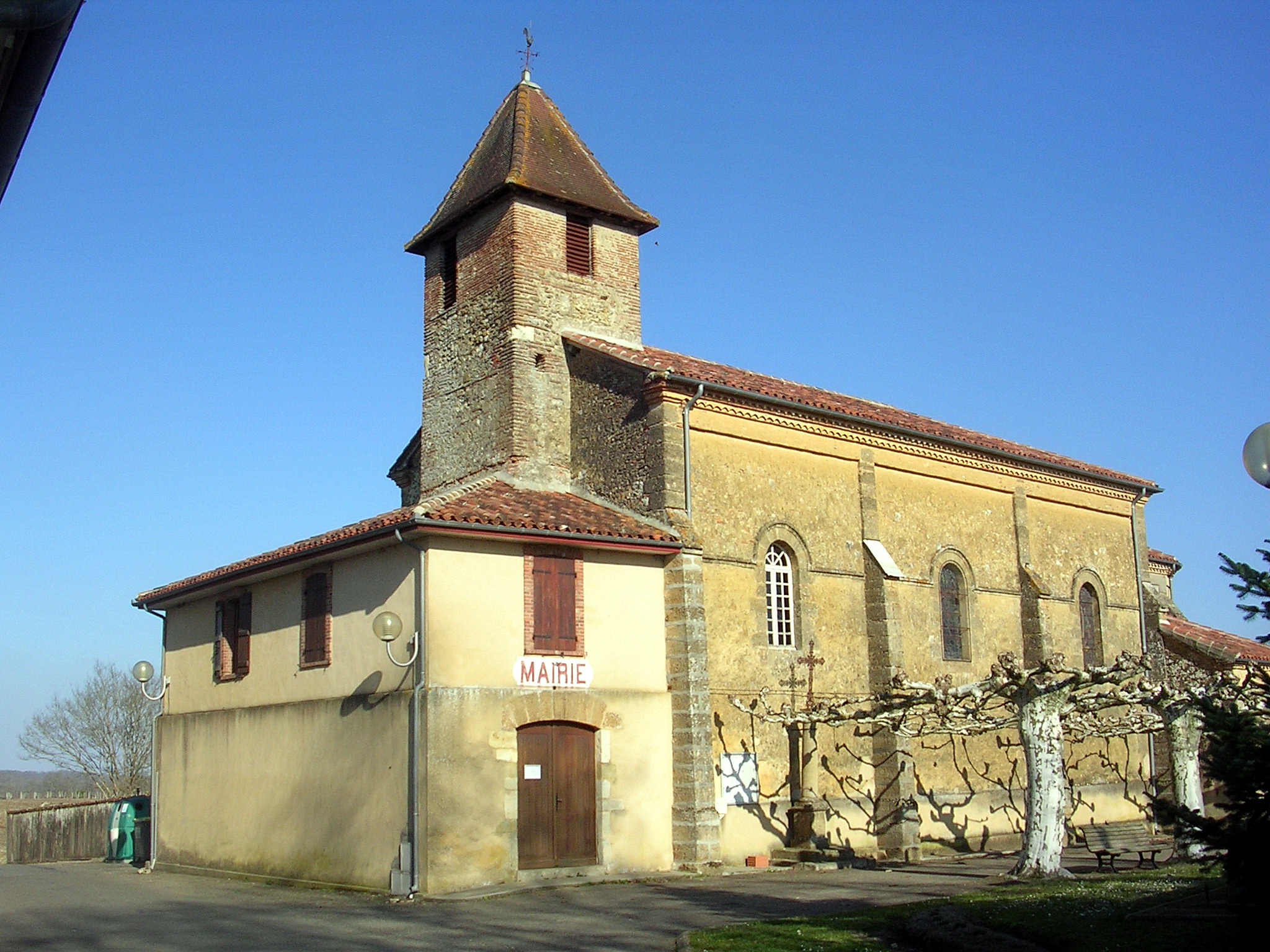
- Church and town hall
- Location of Arthez-d'Armagnac
- Location within France Location within Nouvelle-Aquitaine
- Coordinates: 43°53′45″N 0°15′29″W
- Country: France
- Region: Nouvelle-Aquitaine
- Department: Landes
- Arrondissement: Mont-de-Marsan
- Canton: Adour Armagnac
- Intercommunality: CC Pays Villeneuve Armagnac Landais

Government
  - Mayor (2020–2026): Jean-Philippe Brunello
- Area^{1}: 11.17 km^{2} (4.31 sq mi)
- Elevation: 94 m (308 ft)
- Highest elevation: 114 m (374 ft)
- Lowest elevation: 52 m (171 ft)
- Population (2023): 92
  - Density: 8.2/km^{2} (21/sq mi)
- Time zone: UTC+01:00 (CET)
  - Summer (DST): UTC+02:00 (CEST)
- INSEE/Postal code: 40013 /40190
- ^{1} French Land Register data, which excludes lakes, ponds, glaciers > 1 km^{2} (0.386 sq mi or 247 acres) and river estuaries.

Arthez-d'Armagnac (Occitan: Artés d'Armanhac) is a commune of the Landes department in Nouvelle-Aquitaine in southwestern France.

== Population ==
Historical population
Year	Pop.	±% p.a.
1968	205	—
1975	179	−1.92%
1982	142	−3.25%
1990	93	−5.15%
1999	102	+1.03%
2007	135	+3.57%
2012	118	−2.66%
2017	110	−1.39%
2023	92	−2.93%
Source: INSEE

== See also ==
- Communes of the Landes department
