= Saint-Agnet =

- Commune
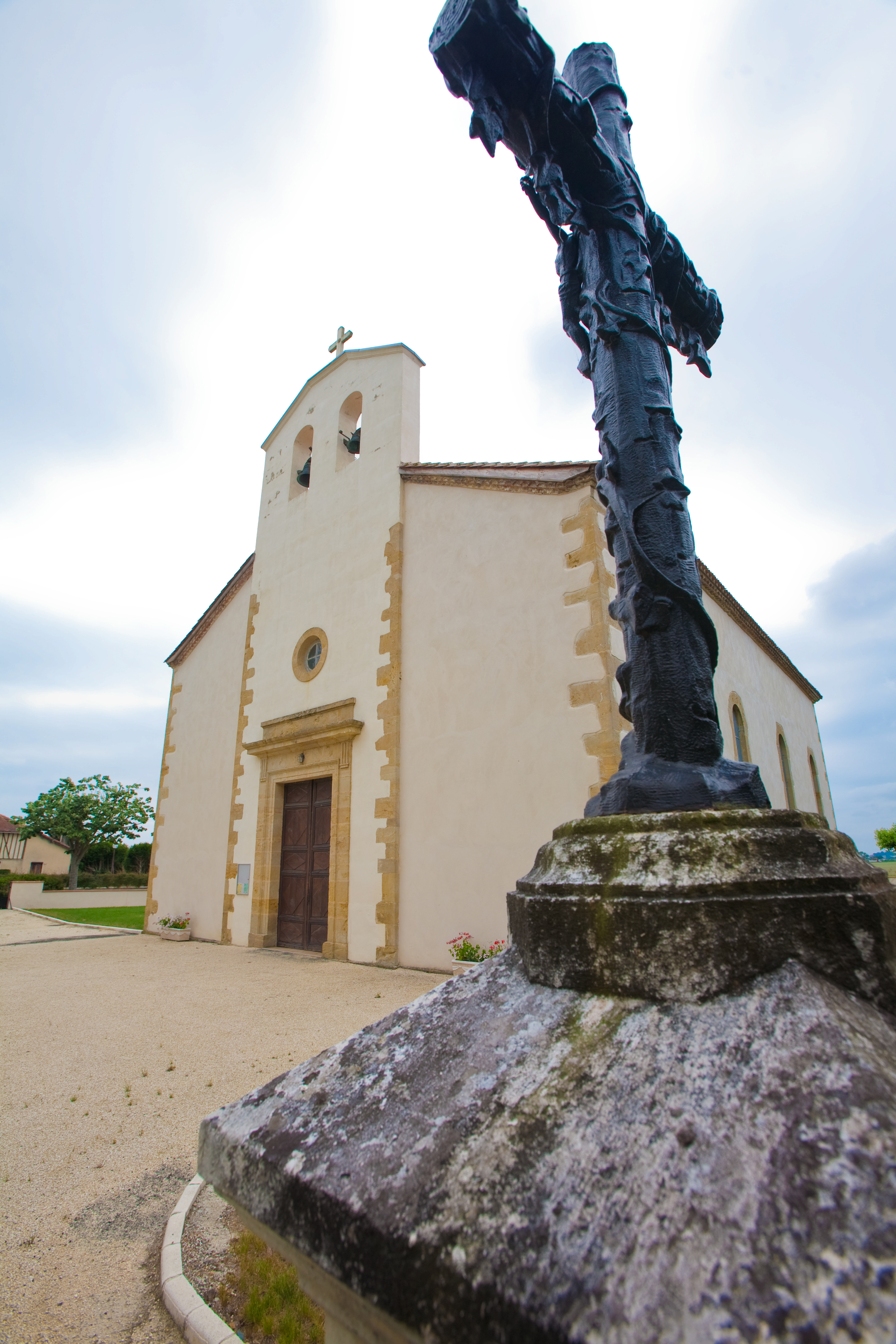
- Location of Saint-Agnet
- Location within France Location within Nouvelle-Aquitaine
- Coordinates: 43°36′26″N 0°16′20″W
- Country: France
- Region: Nouvelle-Aquitaine
- Department: Landes
- Arrondissement: Mont-de-Marsan
- Canton: Adour Armagnac
- Intercommunality: Aire-sur-l'Adour

Government
  - Mayor (2020–2026): Jean-Paul Doreilh
- Area^{1}: 7.8 km^{2} (3.0 sq mi)
- Elevation: 186 m (610 ft)
- Highest elevation: 196 m (643 ft)
- Lowest elevation: 99 m (325 ft)
- Population (2023): 179
  - Density: 23/km^{2} (59/sq mi)
- Time zone: UTC+01:00 (CET)
  - Summer (DST): UTC+02:00 (CEST)
- INSEE/Postal code: 40247 /40800
- ^{1} French Land Register data, which excludes lakes, ponds, glaciers > 1 km^{2} (0.386 sq mi or 247 acres) and river estuaries.

Saint-Agnet (French pronunciation: [sɛ̃t‿aɲɛt]; Occitan: Sent Anhet) is a commune in the Landes department in Nouvelle-Aquitaine in southwestern France.

== Population ==
Historical population
Year	Pop.	±% p.a.
1968	177	—
1975	173	−0.33%
1982	181	+0.65%
1990	190	+0.61%
1999	188	−0.12%
2007	190	+0.13%
2012	197	+0.73%
2017	188	−0.93%
2023	179	−0.81%
Source: INSEE

== See also ==
- Communes of the Landes department
