= Bourdalat =

- Commune
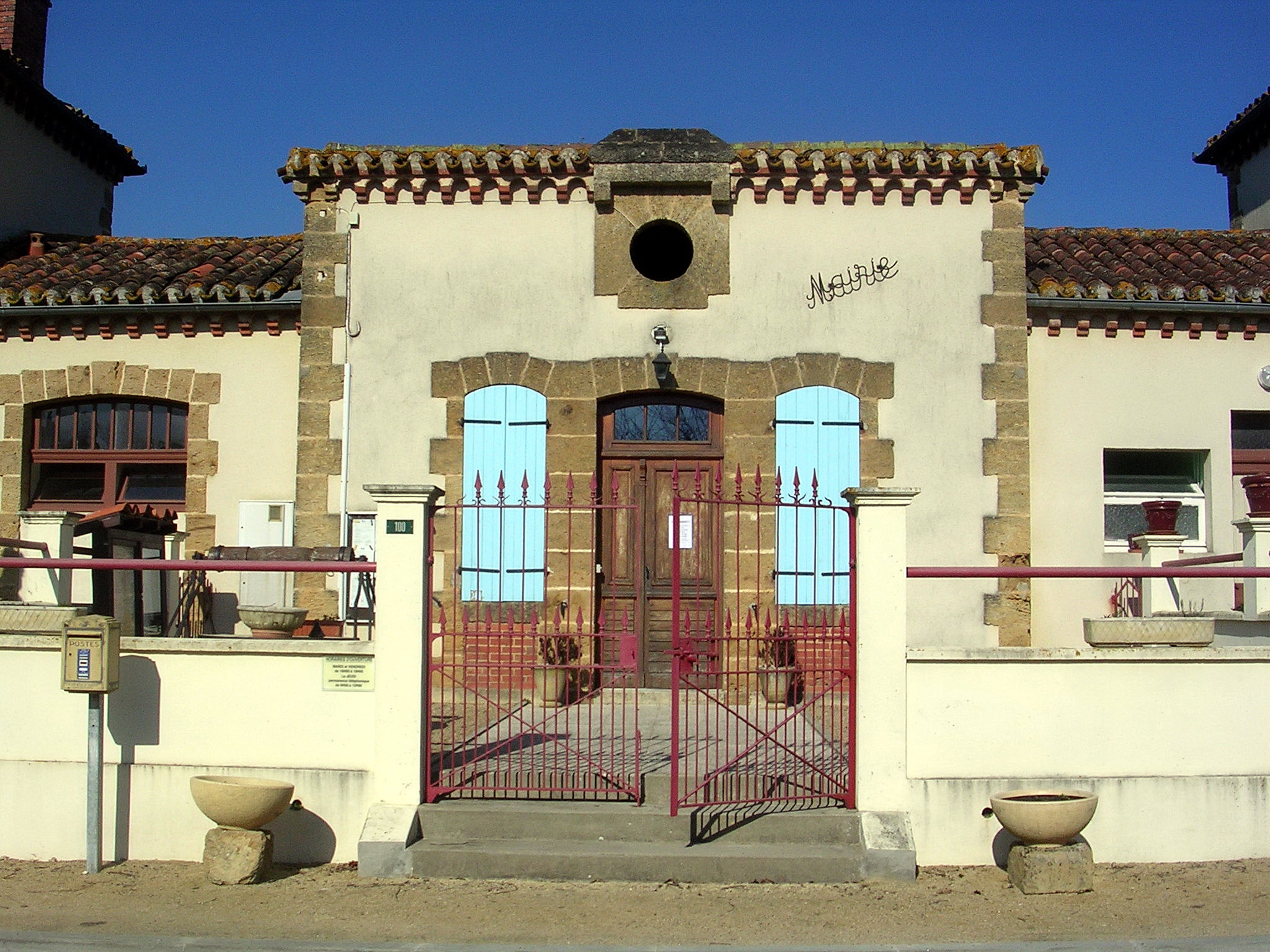
- Town hall
- Location of Bourdalat
- Location within France Location within Nouvelle-Aquitaine
- Coordinates: 43°50′25″N 0°12′31″W
- Country: France
- Region: Nouvelle-Aquitaine
- Department: Landes
- Arrondissement: Mont-de-Marsan
- Canton: Adour Armagnac
- Intercommunality: Pays de Villeneuve en Armagnac Landais

Government
  - Mayor (2020–2026): Éric Darquier
- Area^{1}: 14.15 km^{2} (5.46 sq mi)
- Elevation: 110 m (360 ft)
- Highest elevation: 135 m (443 ft)
- Lowest elevation: 76 m (249 ft)
- Population (2023): 204
  - Density: 14.4/km^{2} (37.3/sq mi)
- Time zone: UTC+01:00 (CET)
  - Summer (DST): UTC+02:00 (CEST)
- INSEE/Postal code: 40052 /40190
- ^{1} French Land Register data, which excludes lakes, ponds, glaciers > 1 km^{2} (0.386 sq mi or 247 acres) and river estuaries.

Bourdalat (French pronunciation: [buʁdala]; Occitan: Bordalat) is a commune in the Landes department in Nouvelle-Aquitaine in southwestern France.

== Geography ==
The commune of Bourdalat is located at the eastern end of the Landes department, near the Gers, and in the heart of the Bas-Armagnac, the most famous area of the appellation of the same name.

=== Hydrography ===
The stream of the Gaube, a tributary of the Midou, waters the lands of the commune. Lake Charros is located in the northeast end of the commune.

== Population ==
Historical population
Year	Pop.	±% p.a.
1968	272	—
1975	252	−1.09%
1982	215	−2.24%
1990	186	−1.79%
1999	187	+0.06%
2007	215	+1.76%
2012	214	−0.09%
2017	252	+3.32%
2023	204	−3.46%
Source: INSEE

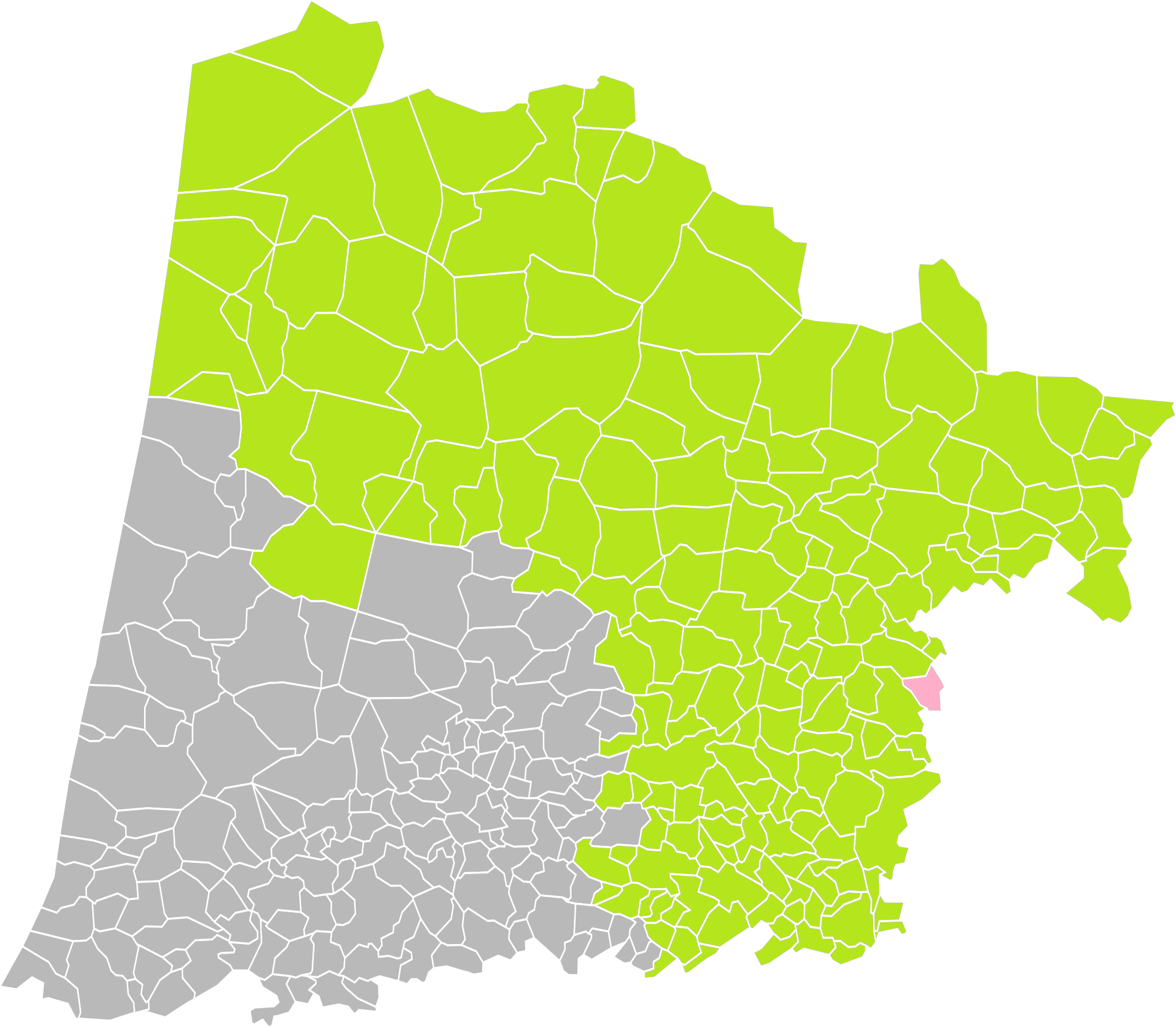
Location of the commune of Bourdalat in the arrondissement of Mont-de-Marsan (Landes)

== See also ==
- Communes of the Landes department
