= Vielle-Tursan =

- Commune
- Location of Vielle-Tursan
- Location within France Location within Nouvelle-Aquitaine
- Coordinates: 43°40′35″N 0°26′57″W
- Country: France
- Region: Nouvelle-Aquitaine
- Department: Landes
- Arrondissement: Mont-de-Marsan
- Canton: Adour Armagnac
- Intercommunality: Aire-sur-l'Adour

Government
  - Mayor (2020–2026): Benoît Laborde
- Area^{1}: 12.81 km^{2} (4.95 sq mi)
- Elevation: 126 m (413 ft)
- Highest elevation: 142 m (466 ft)
- Lowest elevation: 64 m (210 ft)
- Population (2023): 283
  - Density: 22.1/km^{2} (57.2/sq mi)
- Time zone: UTC+01:00 (CET)
  - Summer (DST): UTC+02:00 (CEST)
- INSEE/Postal code: 40325 /40320
- ^{1} French Land Register data, which excludes lakes, ponds, glaciers > 1 km^{2} (0.386 sq mi or 247 acres) and river estuaries.

Vielle-Tursan (French pronunciation: [vjɛl tyʁsɑ̃]; Gascon: Vièla de Tursan) is a commune in the Landes department in Nouvelle-Aquitaine in southwestern France.

== Population ==
Historical population
Year	Pop.	±% p.a.
1968	345	—
1975	339	−0.25%
1982	310	−1.27%
1990	301	−0.37%
1999	291	−0.37%
2007	303	+0.51%
2012	286	−1.15%
2017	257	−2.12%
2023	283	+1.62%
Source: INSEE

== See also ==
- Communes of the Landes department
