= Saint-Gein =

- Commune
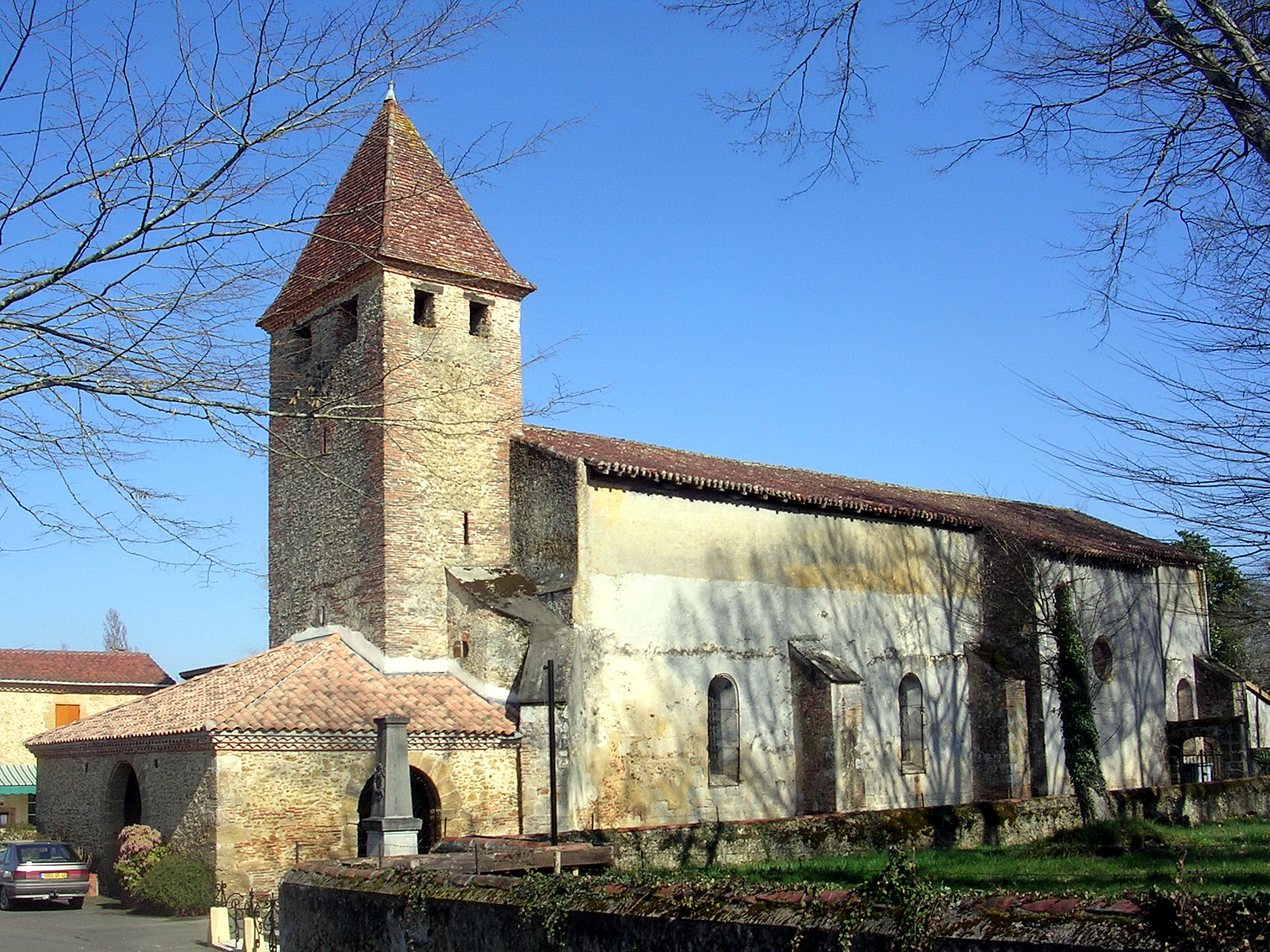
- Location of Saint-Gein
- Location within France Location within Nouvelle-Aquitaine
- Coordinates: 43°50′10″N 0°18′00″W
- Country: France
- Region: Nouvelle-Aquitaine
- Department: Landes
- Arrondissement: Mont-de-Marsan
- Canton: Adour Armagnac
- Intercommunality: Pays de Villeneuve en Armagnac Landais

Government
  - Mayor (2020–2026): Jean-Pierre Catuhe
- Area^{1}: 17.85 km^{2} (6.89 sq mi)
- Elevation: 90 m (300 ft)
- Highest elevation: 127 m (417 ft)
- Lowest elevation: 69 m (226 ft)
- Population (2023): 409
  - Density: 22.9/km^{2} (59.3/sq mi)
- Time zone: UTC+01:00 (CET)
  - Summer (DST): UTC+02:00 (CEST)
- INSEE/Postal code: 40259 /40190
- ^{1} French Land Register data, which excludes lakes, ponds, glaciers > 1 km^{2} (0.386 sq mi or 247 acres) and river estuaries.

Saint-Gein (French pronunciation: [sɛ̃ ʒɛ̃]; Occitan: Sent Genh) is a commune in the Landes department in Nouvelle-Aquitaine in southwestern France.

== Population ==
Historical population
Year	Pop.	±% p.a.
1968	370	—
1975	369	−0.04%
1982	429	+2.18%
1990	426	−0.09%
1999	394	−0.86%
2007	440	+1.39%
2012	440	+0.00%
2017	433	−0.32%
2023	409	−0.95%
Source: INSEE

== See also ==
- Communes of the Landes department
