= Renung =

- Commune
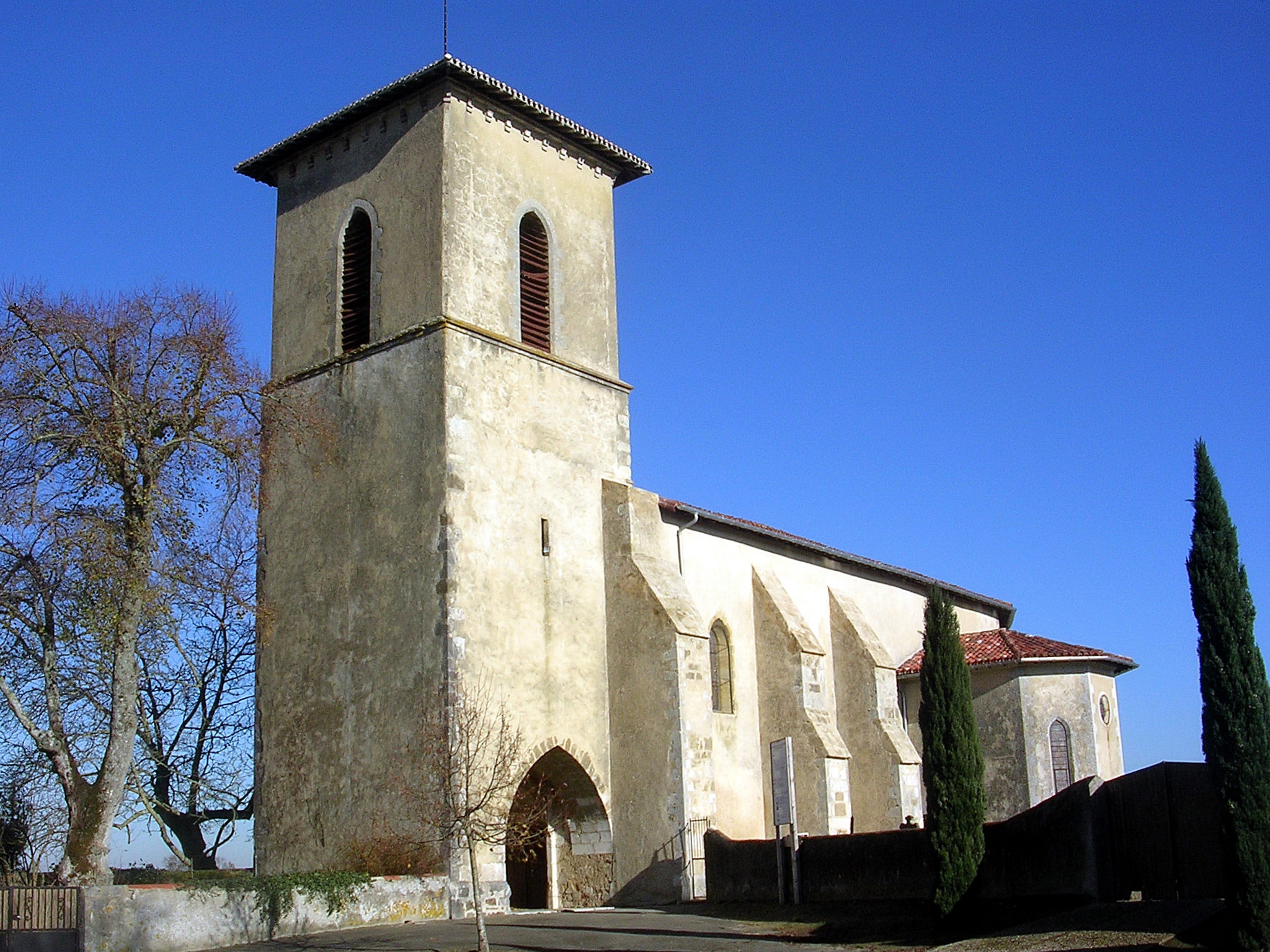
- Location of Renung
- Location within France Location within Nouvelle-Aquitaine
- Coordinates: 43°44′59″N 0°21′30″W
- Country: France
- Region: Nouvelle-Aquitaine
- Department: Landes
- Arrondissement: Mont-de-Marsan
- Canton: Adour Armagnac
- Intercommunality: Aire-sur-l'Adour

Government
  - Mayor (2020–2026): Dominique Saint-Germain
- Area^{1}: 21.95 km^{2} (8.47 sq mi)
- Elevation: 127 m (417 ft)
- Highest elevation: 145 m (476 ft)
- Lowest elevation: 54 m (177 ft)
- Population (2023): 483
  - Density: 22.0/km^{2} (57.0/sq mi)
- Time zone: UTC+01:00 (CET)
  - Summer (DST): UTC+02:00 (CEST)
- INSEE/Postal code: 40240 /40270
- ^{1} French Land Register data, which excludes lakes, ponds, glaciers > 1 km^{2} (0.386 sq mi or 247 acres) and river estuaries.

Renung (French pronunciation: [ʁənœ̃]; Gascon: Renun) is a commune in the Landes department in Nouvelle-Aquitaine in southwestern France.

== Population ==
Historical population
Year	Pop.	±% p.a.
1968	413	—
1975	376	−1.33%
1982	368	−0.31%
1990	443	+2.35%
1999	467	+0.59%
2007	472	+0.13%
2012	521	+2.00%
2017	537	+0.61%
2023	483	−1.75%
Source: INSEE

== See also ==
- Communes of the Landes department
