= Le Vignau =

- Commune
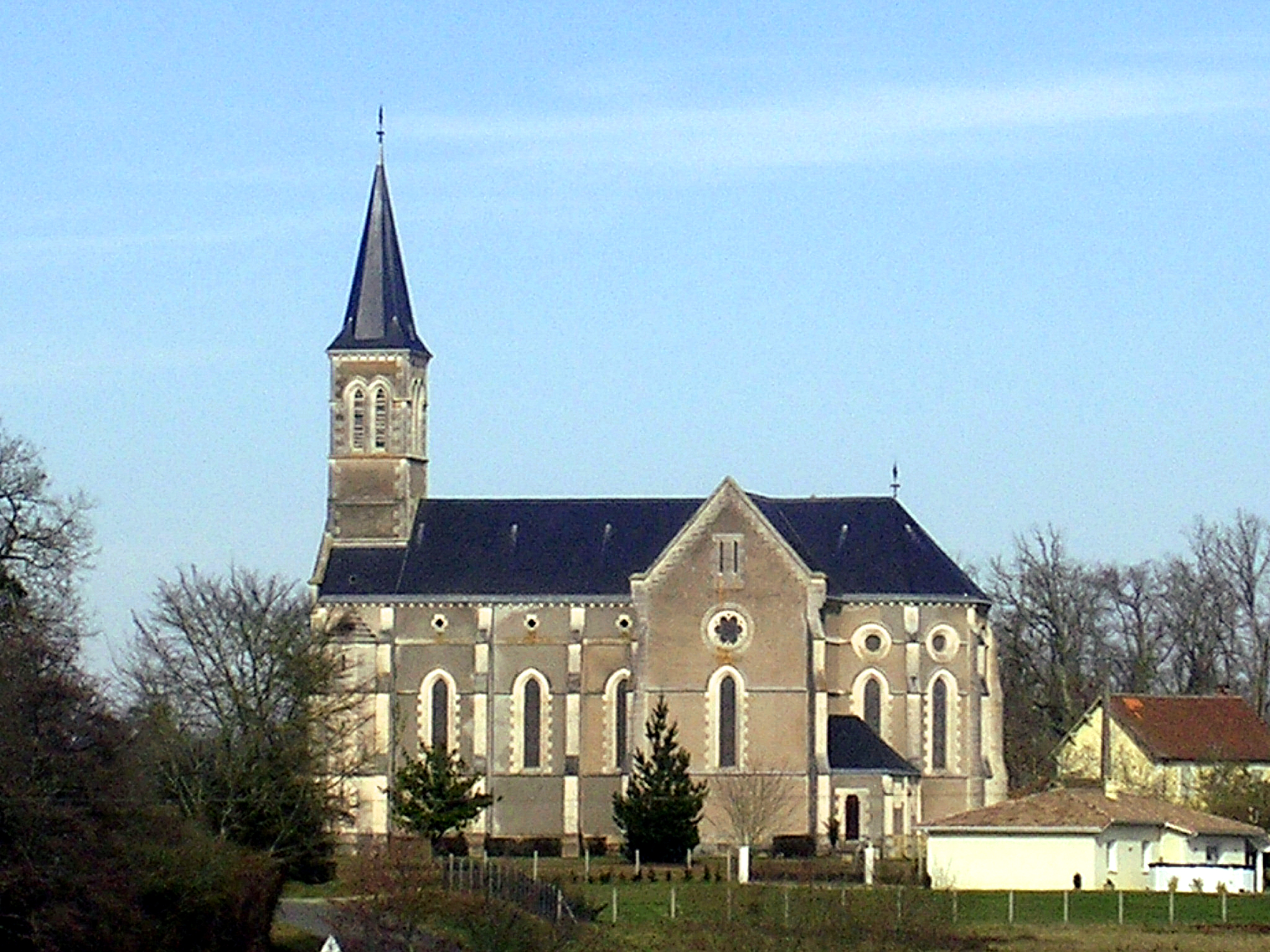
- Location of Le Vignau
- Location within France Location within Nouvelle-Aquitaine
- Coordinates: 43°46′45″N 0°17′15″W
- Country: France
- Region: Nouvelle-Aquitaine
- Department: Landes
- Arrondissement: Mont-de-Marsan
- Canton: Adour Armagnac
- Intercommunality: Pays Grenadois

Government
  - Mayor (2020–2026): Patrick Dauga
- Area^{1}: 11.07 km^{2} (4.27 sq mi)
- Elevation: 105 m (344 ft)
- Highest elevation: 132 m (433 ft)
- Lowest elevation: 72 m (236 ft)
- Population (2023): 522
  - Density: 47.2/km^{2} (122/sq mi)
- Time zone: UTC+01:00 (CET)
  - Summer (DST): UTC+02:00 (CEST)
- INSEE/Postal code: 40329 /40270
- ^{1} French Land Register data, which excludes lakes, ponds, glaciers > 1 km^{2} (0.386 sq mi or 247 acres) and river estuaries.

Le Vignau (French pronunciation: [lə viɲo]; Occitan: Lo Vinhau) is a commune in Landes, a department in Nouvelle-Aquitaine in southwestern France.

== Population ==
Historical population
Year	Pop.	±% p.a.
1968	383	—
1975	355	−1.08%
1982	374	+0.75%
1990	391	+0.56%
1999	385	−0.17%
2007	454	+2.08%
2012	507	+2.23%
2017	490	−0.68%
2023	522	+1.06%
Source: INSEE

== See also ==
- Communes of the Landes department
