= Latrille =

- Commune
- Location of Latrille
- Location within France Location within Nouvelle-Aquitaine
- Coordinates: 43°37′45″N 0°17′13″W
- Country: France
- Region: Nouvelle-Aquitaine
- Department: Landes
- Arrondissement: Mont-de-Marsan
- Canton: Adour Armagnac
- Intercommunality: CC Aire-sur-l'Adour

Government
  - Mayor (2020–2026): Nadine Fabères
- Area^{1}: 6.84 km^{2} (2.64 sq mi)
- Elevation: 200 m (660 ft)
- Highest elevation: 187 m (614 ft)
- Lowest elevation: 132 m (433 ft)
- Population (2023): 168
  - Density: 24.6/km^{2} (63.6/sq mi)
- Time zone: UTC+01:00 (CET)
  - Summer (DST): UTC+02:00 (CEST)
- INSEE/Postal code: 40146 /40800
- ^{1} French Land Register data, which excludes lakes, ponds, glaciers > 1 km^{2} (0.386 sq mi or 247 acres) and river estuaries.

Latrille (French pronunciation: [latʁij]; Gascon: La Trilha) is a commune in the Landes department in Nouvelle-Aquitaine in south-western France.

== See also ==
- Communes of the Landes department
