= Le Frêche =

- Commune
- Location of Le Frêche
- Location within France Location within Nouvelle-Aquitaine
- Coordinates: 43°56′01″N 0°14′22″W
- Country: France
- Region: Nouvelle-Aquitaine
- Department: Landes
- Arrondissement: Mont-de-Marsan
- Canton: Adour Armagnac
- Intercommunality: Pays de Villeneuve en Armagnac Landais

Government
  - Mayor (2020–2026): Nadine Bougue
- Area^{1}: 23.41 km^{2} (9.04 sq mi)
- Elevation: 100 m (330 ft)
- Highest elevation: 124 m (407 ft)
- Lowest elevation: 55 m (180 ft)
- Population (2023): 367
  - Density: 15.7/km^{2} (40.6/sq mi)
- Time zone: UTC+01:00 (CET)
  - Summer (DST): UTC+02:00 (CEST)
- INSEE/Postal code: 40100 /40190
- ^{1} French Land Register data, which excludes lakes, ponds, glaciers > 1 km^{2} (0.386 sq mi or 247 acres) and river estuaries.

Le Frêche (French pronunciation: [lə fʁɛʃ]; Occitan: Lo Hrèishe, before 1962: Frêche) is a commune in the Landes department in Nouvelle-Aquitaine in southwestern France.

Le Frêche is situated in the heart of the region of Armagnac and produces the best Armagnac (brandy) in southwestern France.

== Population ==
Historical population
Year	Pop.	±% p.a.
1968	529	—
1975	472	−1.62%
1982	438	−1.06%
1990	392	−1.38%
1999	386	−0.17%
2007	393	+0.22%
2012	385	−0.41%
2017	400	+0.77%
2023	367	−1.42%
Source: INSEE

== Sights ==
- Saint-Vidou Church
- Lafitte-Boingnères Castle

== See also ==
- Communes of the Landes department
