= Pujo-le-Plan =

- Commune
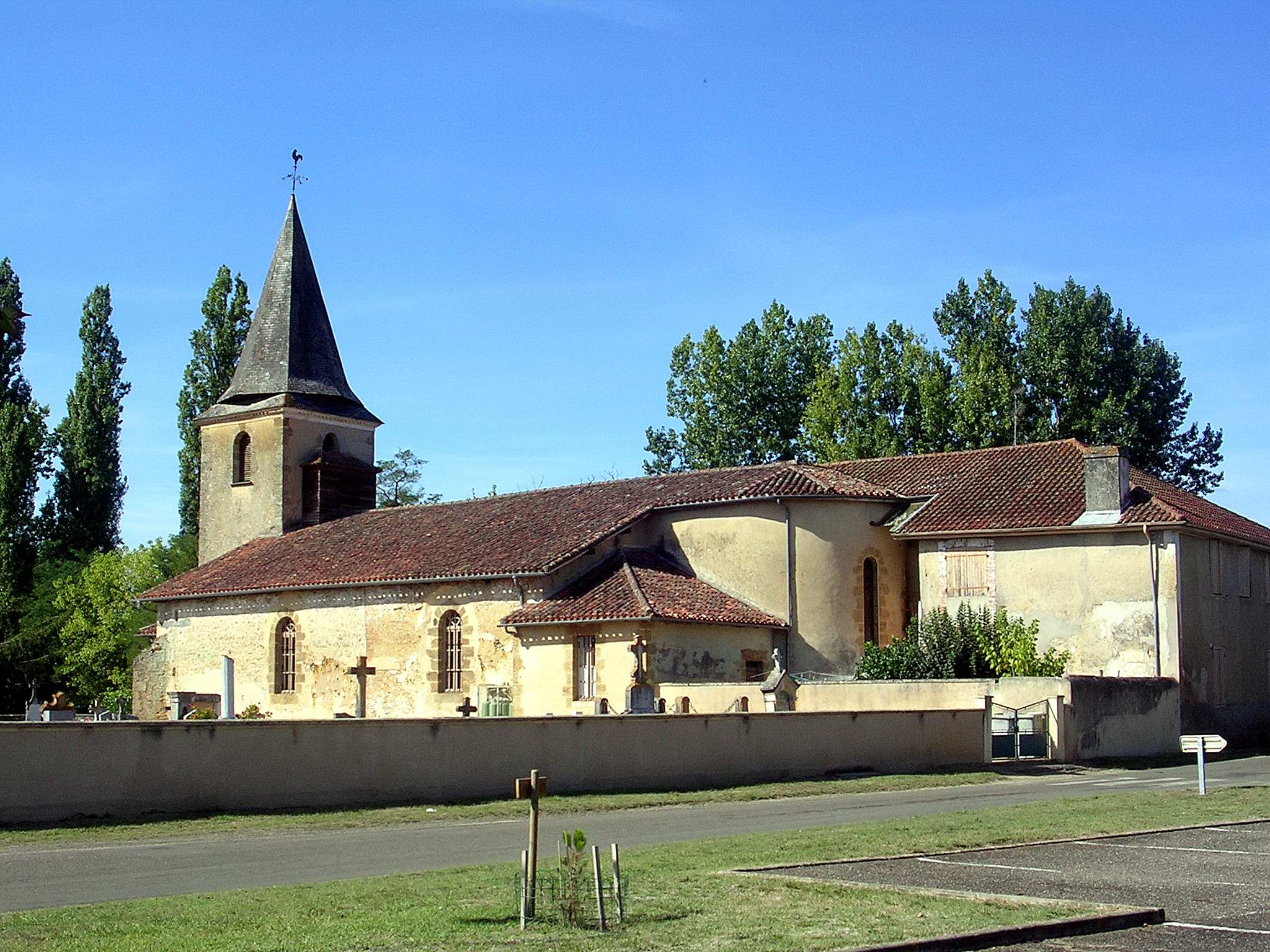
- Location of Pujo-le-Plan
- Location within France Location within Nouvelle-Aquitaine
- Coordinates: 43°51′45″N 0°19′51″W
- Country: France
- Region: Nouvelle-Aquitaine
- Department: Landes
- Arrondissement: Mont-de-Marsan
- Canton: Adour Armagnac
- Intercommunality: Pays de Villeneuve en Armagnac Landais

Government
  - Mayor (2020–2026): Florence Lesparre
- Area^{1}: 18.51 km^{2} (7.15 sq mi)
- Elevation: 73 m (240 ft)
- Highest elevation: 116 m (381 ft)
- Lowest elevation: 51 m (167 ft)
- Population (2023): 641
  - Density: 34.6/km^{2} (89.7/sq mi)
- Time zone: UTC+01:00 (CET)
  - Summer (DST): UTC+02:00 (CEST)
- INSEE/Postal code: 40238 /40190
- ^{1} French Land Register data, which excludes lakes, ponds, glaciers > 1 km^{2} (0.386 sq mi or 247 acres) and river estuaries.

Pujo-le-Plan (French pronunciation: [pyʒo lə plɑ̃]; Occitan: Pujòu e Lo Plan) is a commune in the Landes department in Nouvelle-Aquitaine in southwestern France.

== Population ==
Historical population
Year	Pop.	±% p.a.
1968	419	—
1975	405	−0.48%
1982	476	+2.33%
1990	527	+1.28%
1999	544	+0.35%
2007	574	+0.67%
2012	599	+0.86%
2017	628	+0.95%
2023	641	+0.34%
Source: INSEE

== See also ==
- Communes of the Landes department
