= Château de Ravignan =

Château in Landes, Nouvelle-Aquitaine, France

Coordinates: 43°52′32″N 0°17′00″W

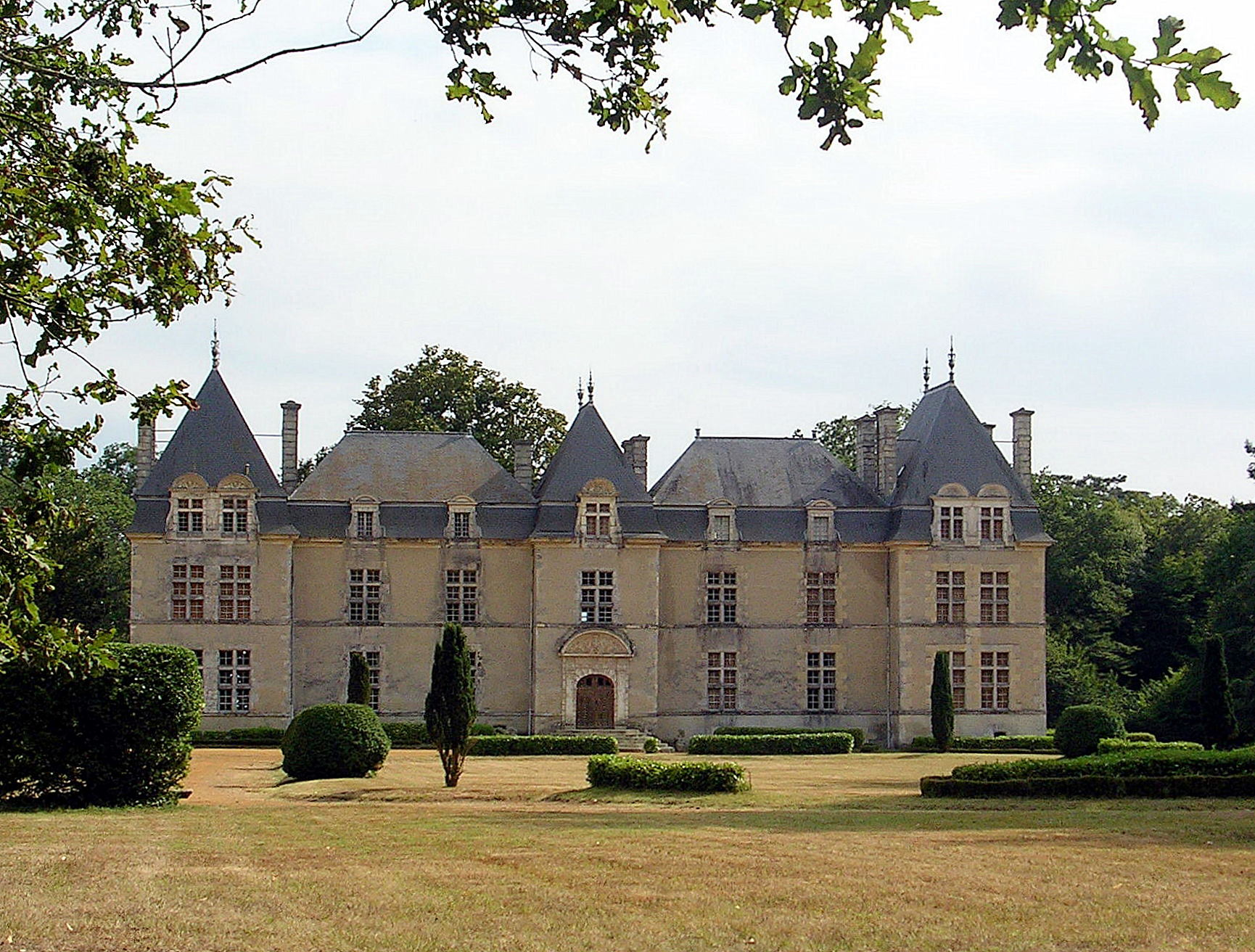

Château de Ravignan is a château in Landes, Nouvelle-Aquitaine, France. It dates to 1663.
