= Canton of Chalosse Tursan =

Coordinates: 43.65°N 0.59°W

The canton of Chalosse Tursan is an administrative division of the Landes department, southwestern France. It was created at the French canton reorganisation which came into effect in March 2015. Its seat is in Hagetmau.

It consists of the following communes:

1. Arboucave
2. Aubagnan
3. Audignon
4. Aurice
5. Banos
6. Bas-Mauco
7. Bats
8. Castelnau-Tursan
9. Castelner
10. Cauna
11. Cazalis
12. Clèdes
13. Coudures
14. Dumes
15. Eyres-Moncube
16. Fargues
17. Geaune
18. Hagetmau
19. Haut-Mauco
20. Horsarrieu
21. Labastide-Chalosse
22. Lacajunte
23. Lacrabe
24. Lauret
25. Mant
26. Mauries
27. Miramont-Sensacq
28. Momuy
29. Monget
30. Monségur
31. Montaut
32. Montgaillard
33. Montsoué
34. Morganx
35. Payros-Cazautets
36. Pécorade
37. Peyre
38. Philondenx
39. Pimbo
40. Poudenx
41. Puyol-Cazalet
42. Saint-Cricq-Chalosse
43. Sainte-Colombe
44. Saint-Sever
45. Samadet
46. Sarraziet
47. Serres-Gaston
48. Serreslous-et-Arribans
49. Sorbets
50. Urgons
