= Serreslous-et-Arribans =

- Commune
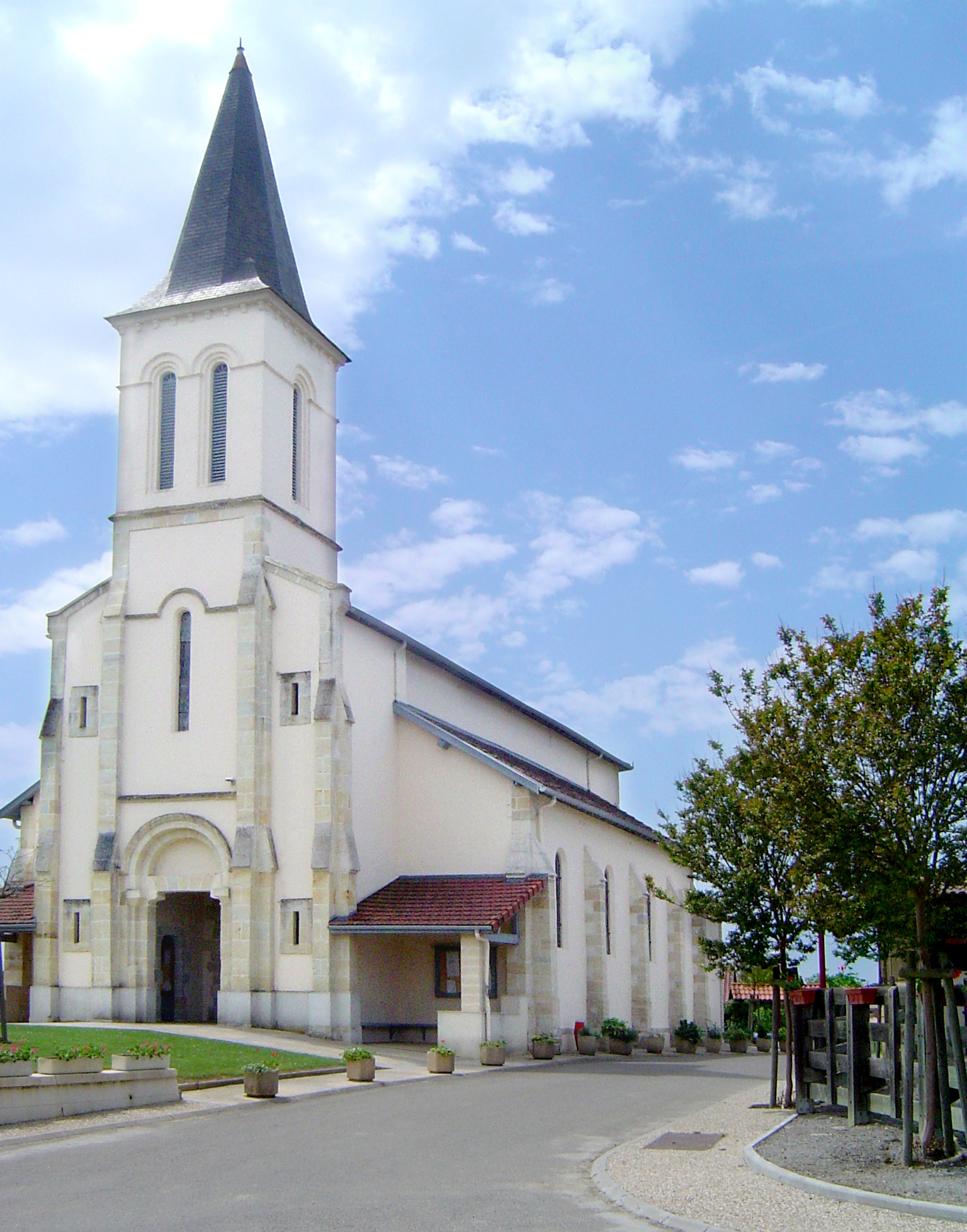
- Location of Serreslous-et-Arribans
- Location within France Location within Nouvelle-Aquitaine
- Coordinates: 43°39′50″N 0°38′41″W
- Country: France
- Region: Nouvelle-Aquitaine
- Department: Landes
- Arrondissement: Mont-de-Marsan
- Canton: Chalosse Tursan

Government
  - Mayor (2020–2026): Geneviève Lafargue-Anaclet
- Area^{1}: 5.46 km^{2} (2.11 sq mi)
- Elevation: 132 m (433 ft)
- Highest elevation: 132 m (433 ft)
- Lowest elevation: 62 m (203 ft)
- Population (2023): 196
  - Density: 35.9/km^{2} (93.0/sq mi)
- Time zone: UTC+01:00 (CET)
  - Summer (DST): UTC+02:00 (CEST)
- INSEE/Postal code: 40299 /40700
- ^{1} French Land Register data, which excludes lakes, ponds, glaciers > 1 km^{2} (0.386 sq mi or 247 acres) and river estuaries.

Serreslous-et-Arribans is a commune in the Landes department in Nouvelle-Aquitaine in southwestern France.

== Population ==
Historical population
Year	Pop.	±% p.a.
1968	166	—
1975	146	−1.82%
1982	150	+0.39%
1990	169	+1.50%
1999	182	+0.83%
2007	208	+1.68%
2012	203	−0.49%
2017	194	−0.90%
2023	196	+0.17%
Source: INSEE

== See also ==
- Communes of the Landes department
