= Haut-Mauco =

- Commune
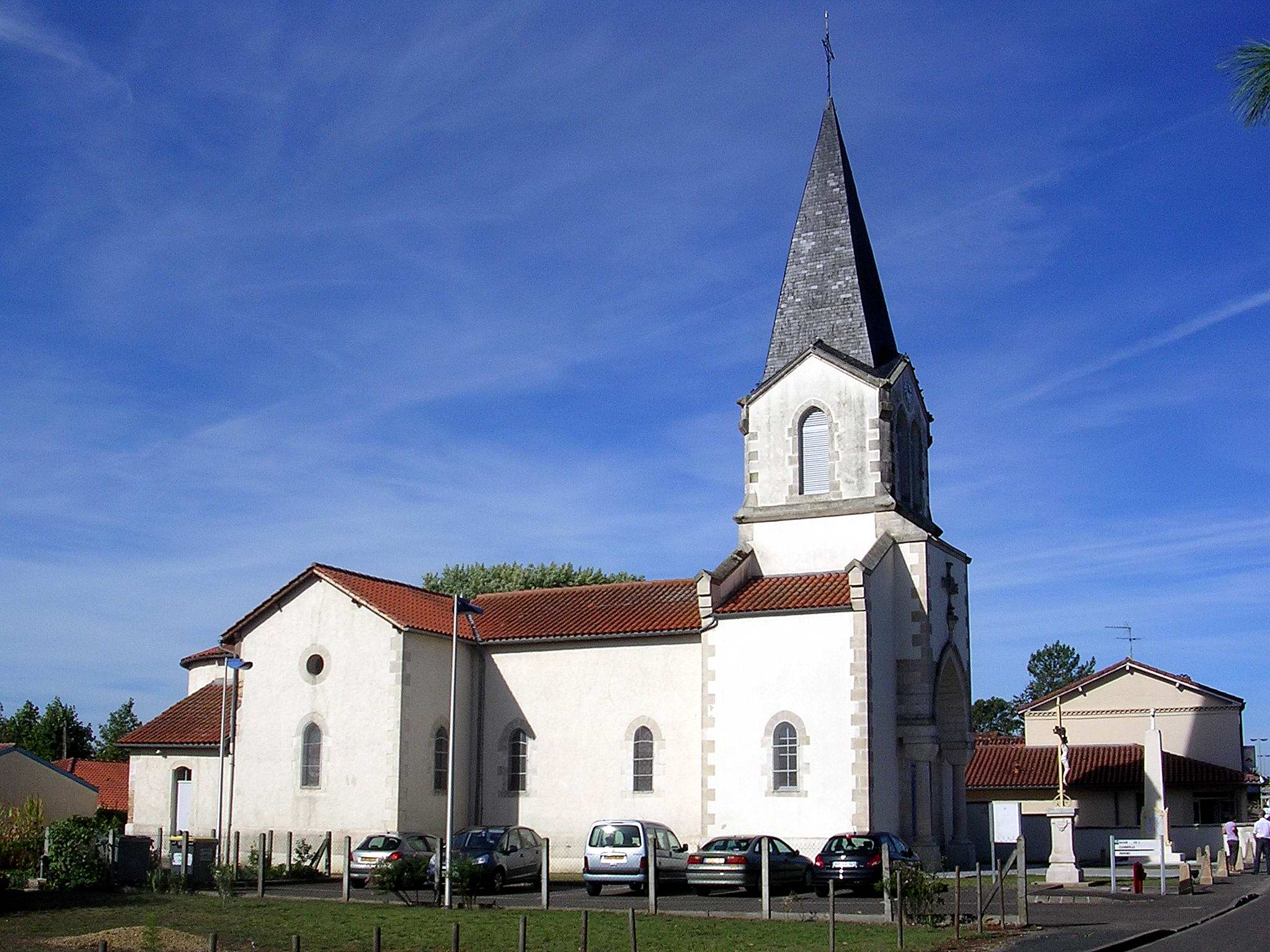
- Location of Haut-Mauco
- Location within France Location within Nouvelle-Aquitaine
- Coordinates: 43°49′36″N 0°33′15″W
- Country: France
- Region: Nouvelle-Aquitaine
- Department: Landes
- Arrondissement: Mont-de-Marsan
- Canton: Chalosse Tursan

Government
  - Mayor (2020–2026): Gilbert Lanne
- Area^{1}: 18.64 km^{2} (7.20 sq mi)
- Elevation: 85 m (279 ft)
- Highest elevation: 91 m (299 ft)
- Lowest elevation: 49 m (161 ft)
- Population (2023): 1,001
  - Density: 53.70/km^{2} (139.1/sq mi)
- Time zone: UTC+01:00 (CET)
  - Summer (DST): UTC+02:00 (CEST)
- INSEE/Postal code: 40122 /40280
- ^{1} French Land Register data, which excludes lakes, ponds, glaciers > 1 km^{2} (0.386 sq mi or 247 acres) and river estuaries.

Haut-Mauco (French pronunciation: [o moko]; Occitan: Mau Còrn Haut) is a commune in the Landes department in Nouvelle-Aquitaine in southwestern France.

== Population ==
Historical population
Year	Pop.	±% p.a.
1968	552	—
1975	550	−0.05%
1982	621	+1.75%
1990	628	+0.14%
1999	721	+1.55%
2007	785	+1.07%
2012	878	+2.26%
2017	948	+1.55%
2023	1,001	+0.91%
Source: INSEE

== See also ==
- Communes of the Landes department
