= Peyre, Landes =

Peyre
- Commune
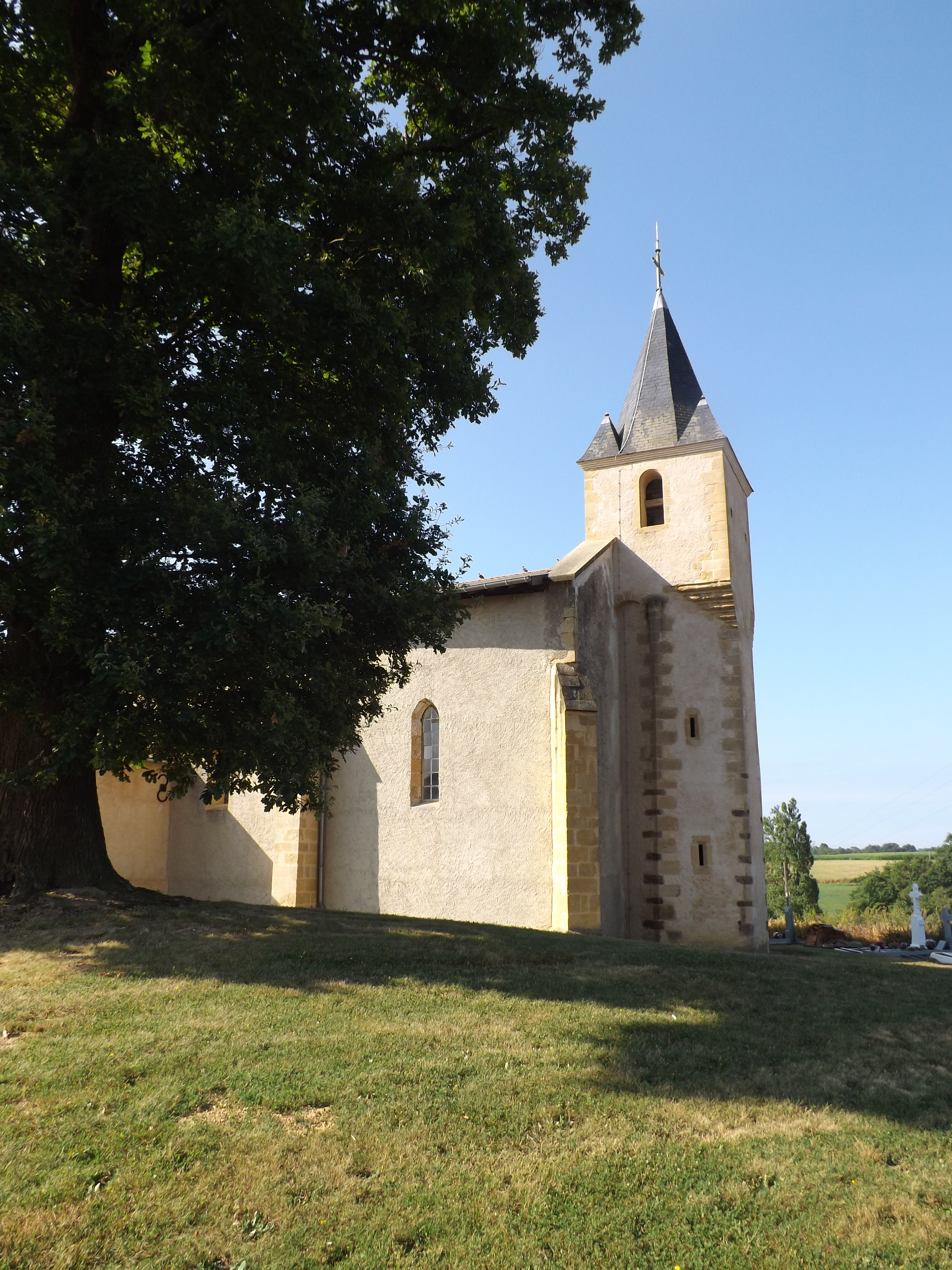
- Location of Peyre
- Location within France Location within Nouvelle-Aquitaine
- Coordinates: 43°34′05″N 0°32′45″W
- Country: France
- Region: Nouvelle-Aquitaine
- Department: Landes
- Arrondissement: Mont-de-Marsan
- Canton: Chalosse Tursan

Government
  - Mayor (2020–2026): Chantal Darribère
- Area^{1}: 10.25 km^{2} (3.96 sq mi)
- Elevation: 111 m (364 ft)
- Highest elevation: 156 m (512 ft)
- Lowest elevation: 60 m (200 ft)
- Population (2023): 241
  - Density: 23.5/km^{2} (60.9/sq mi)
- Time zone: UTC+01:00 (CET)
  - Summer (DST): UTC+02:00 (CEST)
- INSEE/Postal code: 40223 /40700
- ^{1} French Land Register data, which excludes lakes, ponds, glaciers > 1 km^{2} (0.386 sq mi or 247 acres) and river estuaries.

Peyre (French pronunciation: [pɛjʁ]; Occitan: Pèira) is a commune in the Landes department in Nouvelle-Aquitaine in southwestern France.

== Population ==
Historical population
Year	Pop.	±% p.a.
1968	267	—
1975	221	−2.67%
1982	229	+0.51%
1990	216	−0.73%
1999	223	+0.35%
2007	194	−1.73%
2012	249	+5.12%
2017	242	−0.57%
2023	241	−0.07%
Source: INSEE

== See also ==
- Communes of the Landes department
