= Bas-Mauco =

- Commune
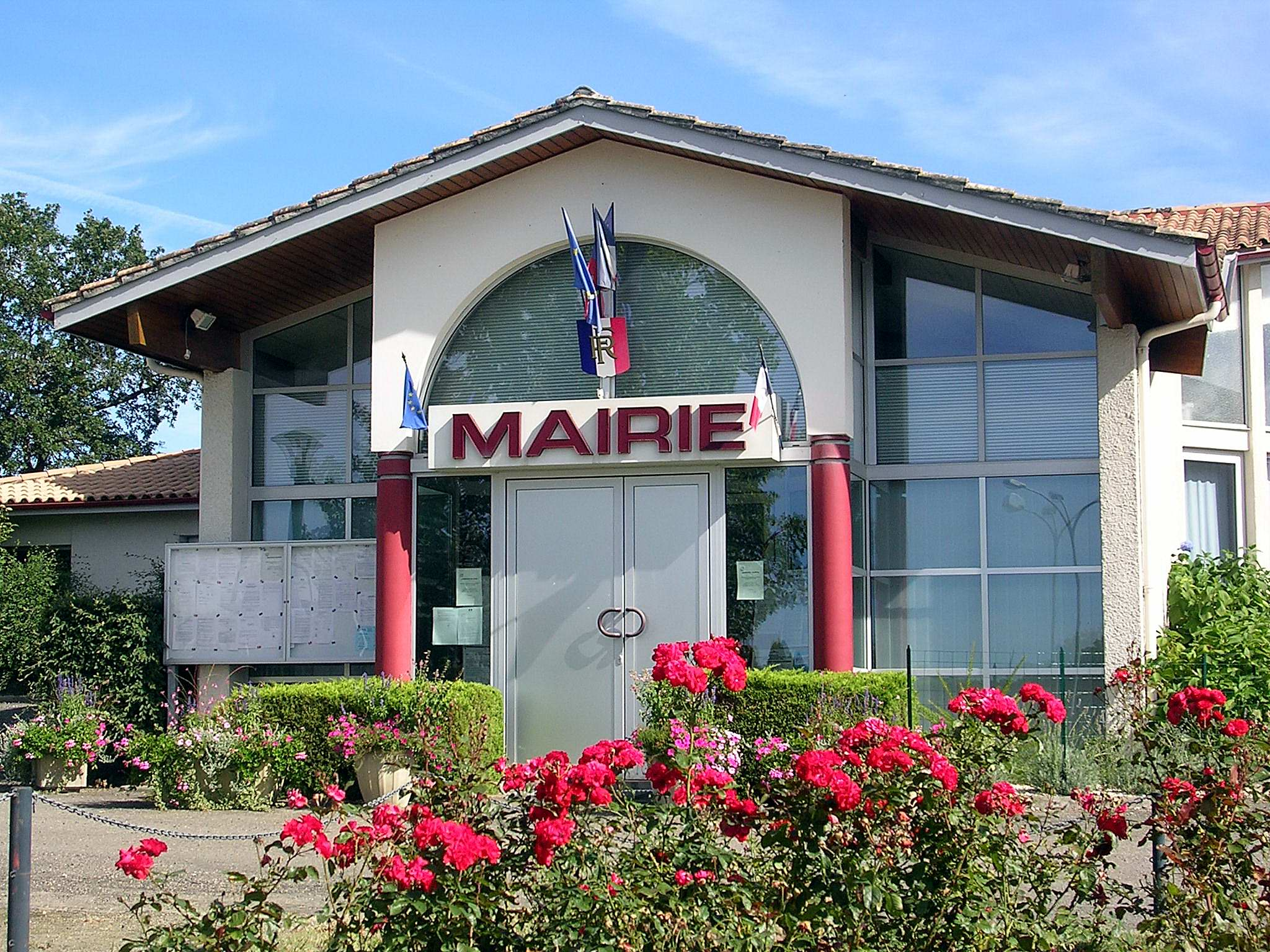
- Town hall
- Location of Bas-Mauco
- Location within France Location within Nouvelle-Aquitaine
- Coordinates: 43°47′50″N 0°33′15″W
- Country: France
- Region: Nouvelle-Aquitaine
- Department: Landes
- Arrondissement: Mont-de-Marsan
- Canton: Chalosse Tursan

Government
  - Mayor (2020–2026): Séverine Hinx
- Area^{1}: 11.5 km^{2} (4.4 sq mi)
- Elevation: 60 m (200 ft)
- Highest elevation: 74 m (243 ft)
- Lowest elevation: 35 m (115 ft)
- Population (2023): 421
  - Density: 36.6/km^{2} (94.8/sq mi)
- Time zone: UTC+01:00 (CET)
  - Summer (DST): UTC+02:00 (CEST)
- INSEE/Postal code: 40026 /40500
- ^{1} French Land Register data, which excludes lakes, ponds, glaciers > 1 km^{2} (0.386 sq mi or 247 acres) and river estuaries.

Bas-Mauco (French pronunciation: [ba moko]; Occitan: Mau Còrn Baish) is a commune in the Landes department in Nouvelle-Aquitaine in southwestern France.

== Population ==
Historical population
Year	Pop.	±% p.a.
1968	116	—
1975	129	+1.53%
1982	160	+3.12%
1990	242	+5.31%
1999	277	+1.51%
2007	302	+1.09%
2012	351	+3.05%
2017	360	+0.51%
2023	421	+2.64%
Source: INSEE

== See also ==
- Communes of the Landes department
