= Mauries =

- Commune
- Location of Mauries
- Location within France Location within Nouvelle-Aquitaine
- Coordinates: 43°37′10″N 0°19′53″W
- Country: France
- Region: Nouvelle-Aquitaine
- Department: Landes
- Arrondissement: Mont-de-Marsan
- Canton: Chalosse Tursan
- Intercommunality: Chalosse Tursan

Government
  - Mayor (2020–2026): Philippe Grangé
- Area^{1}: 5.49 km^{2} (2.12 sq mi)
- Elevation: 128 m (420 ft)
- Highest elevation: 221 m (725 ft)
- Lowest elevation: 103 m (338 ft)
- Population (2023): 84
  - Density: 15/km^{2} (40/sq mi)
- Time zone: UTC+01:00 (CET)
  - Summer (DST): UTC+02:00 (CEST)
- INSEE/Postal code: 40174 /40320
- ^{1} French Land Register data, which excludes lakes, ponds, glaciers > 1 km^{2} (0.386 sq mi or 247 acres) and river estuaries.

Mauries (French pronunciation: [moʁi]; Gascon: Maurias) is a commune in the Landes department in Nouvelle-Aquitaine in south-western France.

== See also ==
- Communes of the Landes department
