= Castelner =

- Commune
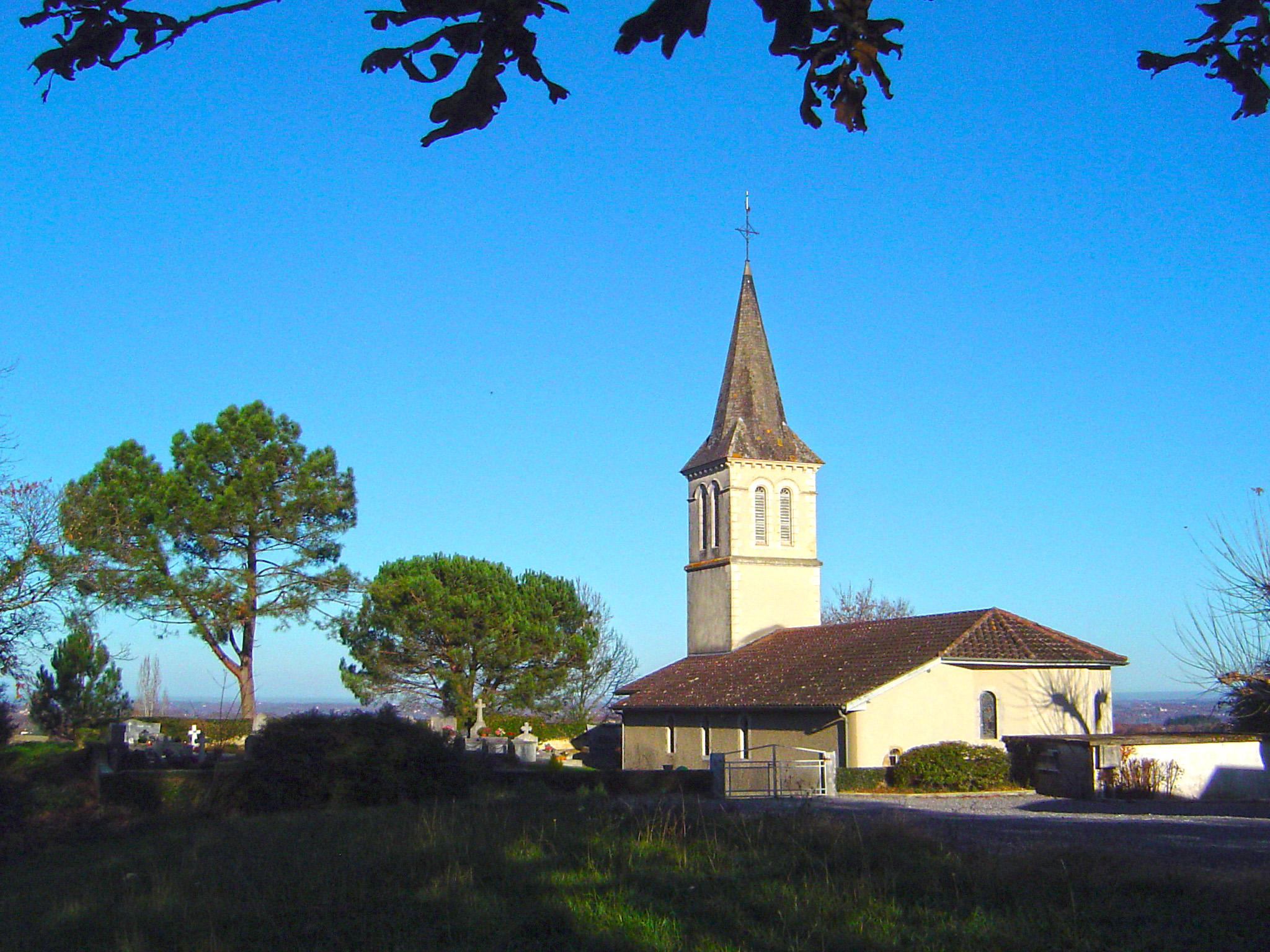
- Location of Castelner
- Location within France Location within Nouvelle-Aquitaine
- Coordinates: 43°33′12″N 0°34′54″W
- Country: France
- Region: Nouvelle-Aquitaine
- Department: Landes
- Arrondissement: Mont-de-Marsan
- Canton: Chalosse Tursan

Government
  - Mayor (2020–2026): Dominique Lastes
- Area^{1}: 5.73 km^{2} (2.21 sq mi)
- Elevation: 180 m (590 ft)
- Highest elevation: 202 m (663 ft)
- Lowest elevation: 74 m (243 ft)
- Population (2023): 120
  - Density: 21/km^{2} (54/sq mi)
- Time zone: UTC+01:00 (CET)
  - Summer (DST): UTC+02:00 (CEST)
- INSEE/Postal code: 40073 /40700
- ^{1} French Land Register data, which excludes lakes, ponds, glaciers > 1 km^{2} (0.386 sq mi or 247 acres) and river estuaries.

Castelner is a commune in the Landes department in Nouvelle-Aquitaine in southwestern France.

== Population ==
Historical population
Year	Pop.	±% p.a.
1968	95	—
1975	81	−2.25%
1982	85	+0.69%
1990	88	+0.43%
1999	103	+1.76%
2007	134	+3.34%
2012	110	−3.87%
2017	107	−0.55%
2023	120	+1.93%
Source: INSEE

== See also ==
- Communes of the Landes department
