= Monget =

- Commune
- Location of Monget
- Location within France Location within Nouvelle-Aquitaine
- Coordinates: 43°34′02″N 0°31′10″W
- Country: France
- Region: Nouvelle-Aquitaine
- Department: Landes
- Arrondissement: Mont-de-Marsan
- Canton: Chalosse Tursan
- Intercommunality: Chalosse Tursan

Government
  - Mayor (2020–2026): Christian Guichené
- Area^{1}: 5.64 km^{2} (2.18 sq mi)
- Elevation: 140 m (460 ft)
- Highest elevation: 170 m (560 ft)
- Lowest elevation: 70 m (230 ft)
- Population (2023): 77
  - Density: 14/km^{2} (35/sq mi)
- Time zone: UTC+01:00 (CET)
  - Summer (DST): UTC+02:00 (CEST)
- INSEE/Postal code: 40189 /40700
- ^{1} French Land Register data, which excludes lakes, ponds, glaciers > 1 km^{2} (0.386 sq mi or 247 acres) and river estuaries.

Monget (French pronunciation: [mɔ̃ʒɛ]) is a commune in the Landes department in Nouvelle-Aquitaine in south-western France.

== See also ==
- Communes of the Landes department
