= Clèdes =

- Commune
- Location of Clèdes
- Location within France Location within Nouvelle-Aquitaine
- Coordinates: 43°37′13″N 0°22′38″W
- Country: France
- Region: Nouvelle-Aquitaine
- Department: Landes
- Arrondissement: Mont-de-Marsan
- Canton: Chalosse Tursan

Government
  - Mayor (2020–2026): Patricia Lamude
- Area^{1}: 6.84 km^{2} (2.64 sq mi)
- Elevation: 164 m (538 ft)
- Highest elevation: 185 m (607 ft)
- Lowest elevation: 91 m (299 ft)
- Population (2023): 115
  - Density: 16.8/km^{2} (43.5/sq mi)
- Time zone: UTC+01:00 (CET)
  - Summer (DST): UTC+02:00 (CEST)
- INSEE/Postal code: 40083 /40320
- ^{1} French Land Register data, which excludes lakes, ponds, glaciers > 1 km^{2} (0.386 sq mi or 247 acres) and river estuaries.

Clèdes (French pronunciation: [klɛd]; Occitan: Cledas) is a commune in the Landes department in Nouvelle-Aquitaine in southwestern France.

== Population ==
Historical population
Year	Pop.	±% p.a.
1968	182	—
1975	147	−3.00%
1982	144	−0.29%
1990	133	−0.99%
1999	128	−0.42%
2007	120	−0.80%
2012	115	−0.85%
2017	128	+2.17%
2023	115	−1.77%
Source: INSEE

== See also ==
- Communes of the Landes department
