= Morganx =

- Commune
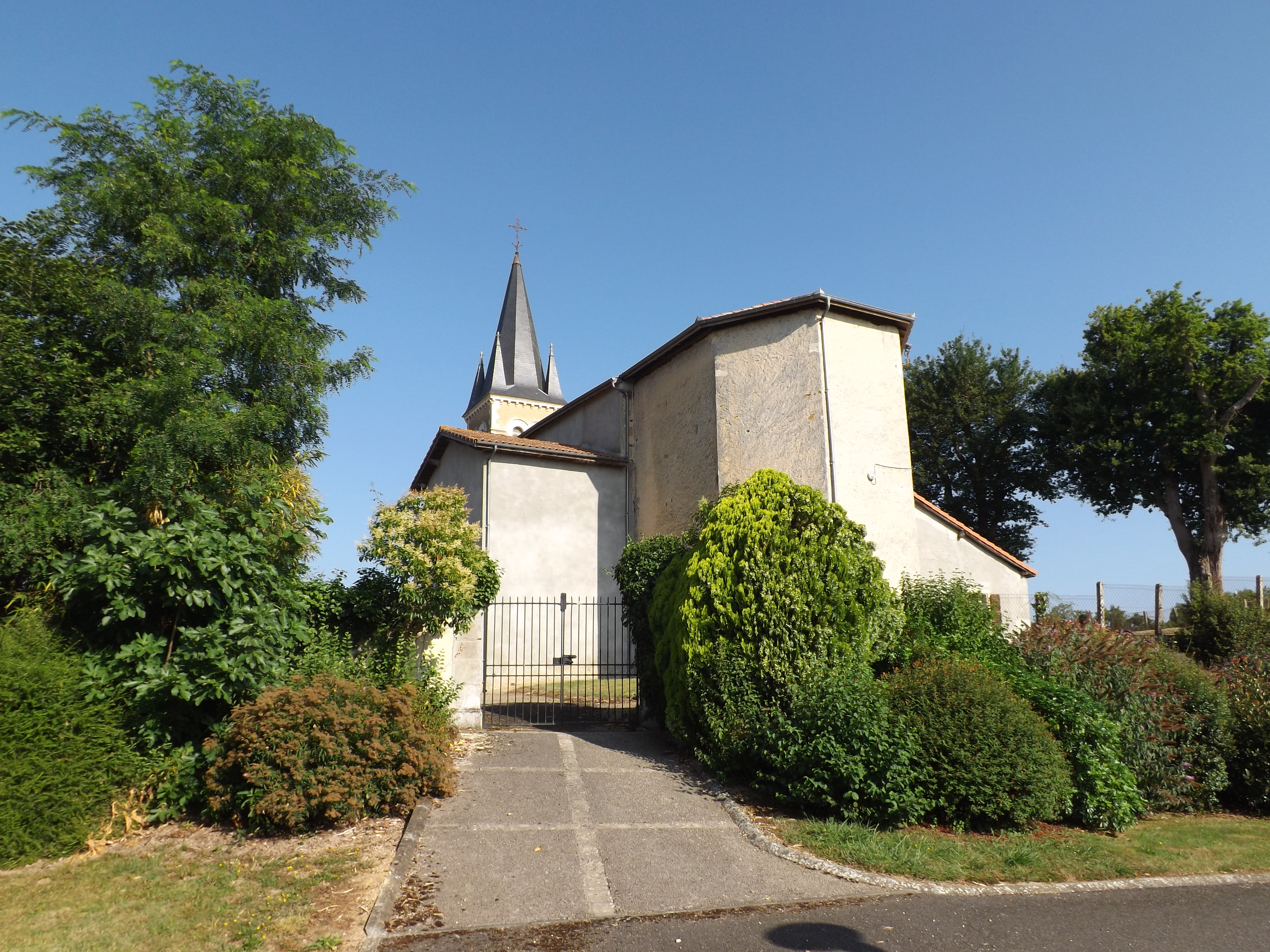

- Coat of arms
- Location of Morganx
- Location within France Location within Nouvelle-Aquitaine
- Coordinates: 43°36′25″N 0°34′09″W
- Country: France
- Region: Nouvelle-Aquitaine
- Department: Landes
- Arrondissement: Mont-de-Marsan
- Canton: Chalosse Tursan

Government
  - Mayor (2020–2026): Jean-Pascal Lalanne
- Area^{1}: 5.22 km^{2} (2.02 sq mi)
- Elevation: 116 m (381 ft)
- Highest elevation: 136 m (446 ft)
- Lowest elevation: 57 m (187 ft)
- Population (2023): 165
  - Density: 31.6/km^{2} (81.9/sq mi)
- Time zone: UTC+01:00 (CET)
  - Summer (DST): UTC+02:00 (CEST)
- INSEE/Postal code: 40198 /40700
- ^{1} French Land Register data, which excludes lakes, ponds, glaciers > 1 km^{2} (0.386 sq mi or 247 acres) and river estuaries.

Morganx is a commune in the Landes department in Nouvelle-Aquitaine in southwestern France.

== Population ==
Historical population
Year	Pop.	±% p.a.
1968	178	—
1975	149	−2.51%
1982	155	+0.57%
1990	172	+1.31%
1999	169	−0.20%
2007	175	+0.44%
2012	184	+1.01%
2017	173	−1.23%
2023	165	−0.79%
Source: INSEE

== See also ==
- Communes of the Landes department
