= Horsarrieu =

- Commune
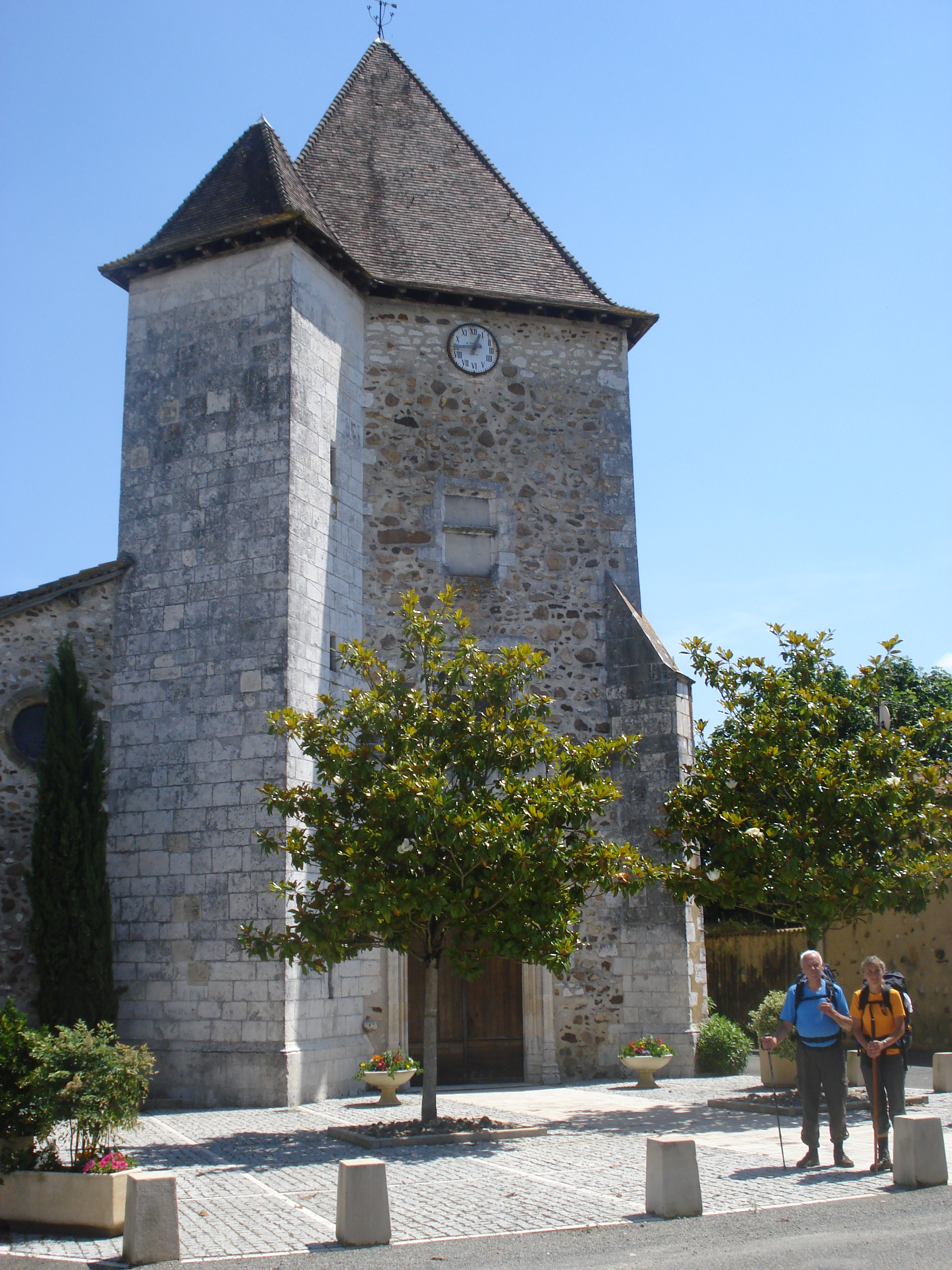
- Location of Horsarrieu
- Location within France Location within Nouvelle-Aquitaine
- Coordinates: 43°41′04″N 0°35′45″W
- Country: France
- Region: Nouvelle-Aquitaine
- Department: Landes
- Arrondissement: Mont-de-Marsan
- Canton: Chalosse Tursan

Government
  - Mayor (2020–2026): Denis Dumartin
- Area^{1}: 11.02 km^{2} (4.25 sq mi)
- Highest elevation: 133 m (436 ft)
- Lowest elevation: 50 m (160 ft)
- Population (2023): 717
  - Density: 65.1/km^{2} (169/sq mi)
- Time zone: UTC+01:00 (CET)
  - Summer (DST): UTC+02:00 (CEST)
- INSEE/Postal code: 40128 /40700
- ^{1} French Land Register data, which excludes lakes, ponds, glaciers > 1 km^{2} (0.386 sq mi or 247 acres) and river estuaries.

Horsarrieu (French pronunciation: [ɔʁsaʁjø]; Occitan: Horcs Arriu) is a commune in the Landes department in Nouvelle-Aquitaine in southwestern France.

== Population ==
Historical population
Year	Pop.	±% p.a.
1968	447	—
1975	478	+0.96%
1982	567	+2.47%
1990	634	+1.41%
1999	636	+0.04%
2007	628	−0.16%
2012	651	+0.72%
2017	687	+1.08%
2023	717	+0.71%
Source: INSEE

== See also ==
- Communes of the Landes department
