= Banos, Landes =

Banos
- Commune
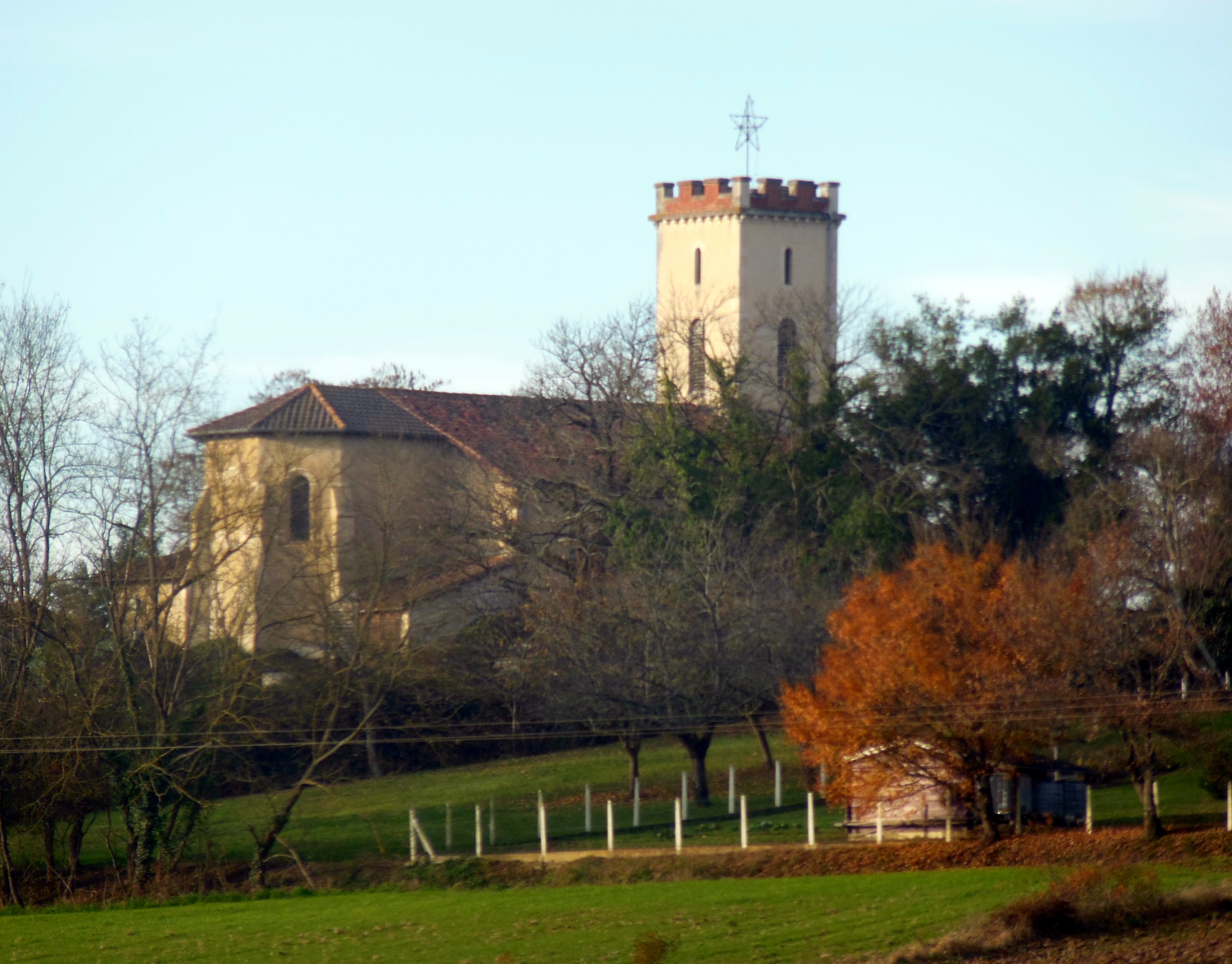
- The church of Banos

- Coat of arms
- Location of Banos
- Location within France Location within Nouvelle-Aquitaine
- Coordinates: 43°44′15″N 0°37′19″W
- Country: France
- Region: Nouvelle-Aquitaine
- Department: Landes
- Arrondissement: Mont-de-Marsan
- Canton: Chalosse Tursan

Government
  - Mayor (2020–2026): Jean-Louis Laporte
- Area^{1}: 5.77 km^{2} (2.23 sq mi)
- Elevation: 100 m (330 ft)
- Highest elevation: 124 m (407 ft)
- Lowest elevation: 34 m (112 ft)
- Population (2023): 271
  - Density: 47.0/km^{2} (122/sq mi)
- Time zone: UTC+01:00 (CET)
  - Summer (DST): UTC+02:00 (CEST)
- INSEE/Postal code: 40024 /40500
- ^{1} French Land Register data, which excludes lakes, ponds, glaciers > 1 km^{2} (0.386 sq mi or 247 acres) and river estuaries.

Banos (French pronunciation: [banɔs]; Occitan: Banòs) is a commune in the Landes department in Nouvelle-Aquitaine in southwestern France.

== Population ==
Historical population
Year	Pop.	±% p.a.
1968	242	—
1975	220	−1.35%
1982	220	+0.00%
1990	225	+0.28%
1999	232	+0.34%
2007	239	+0.37%
2012	272	+2.62%
2017	277	+0.36%
2023	271	−0.36%
Source: INSEE

== See also ==
- Communes of the Landes department
