= Arboucave =

- Commune
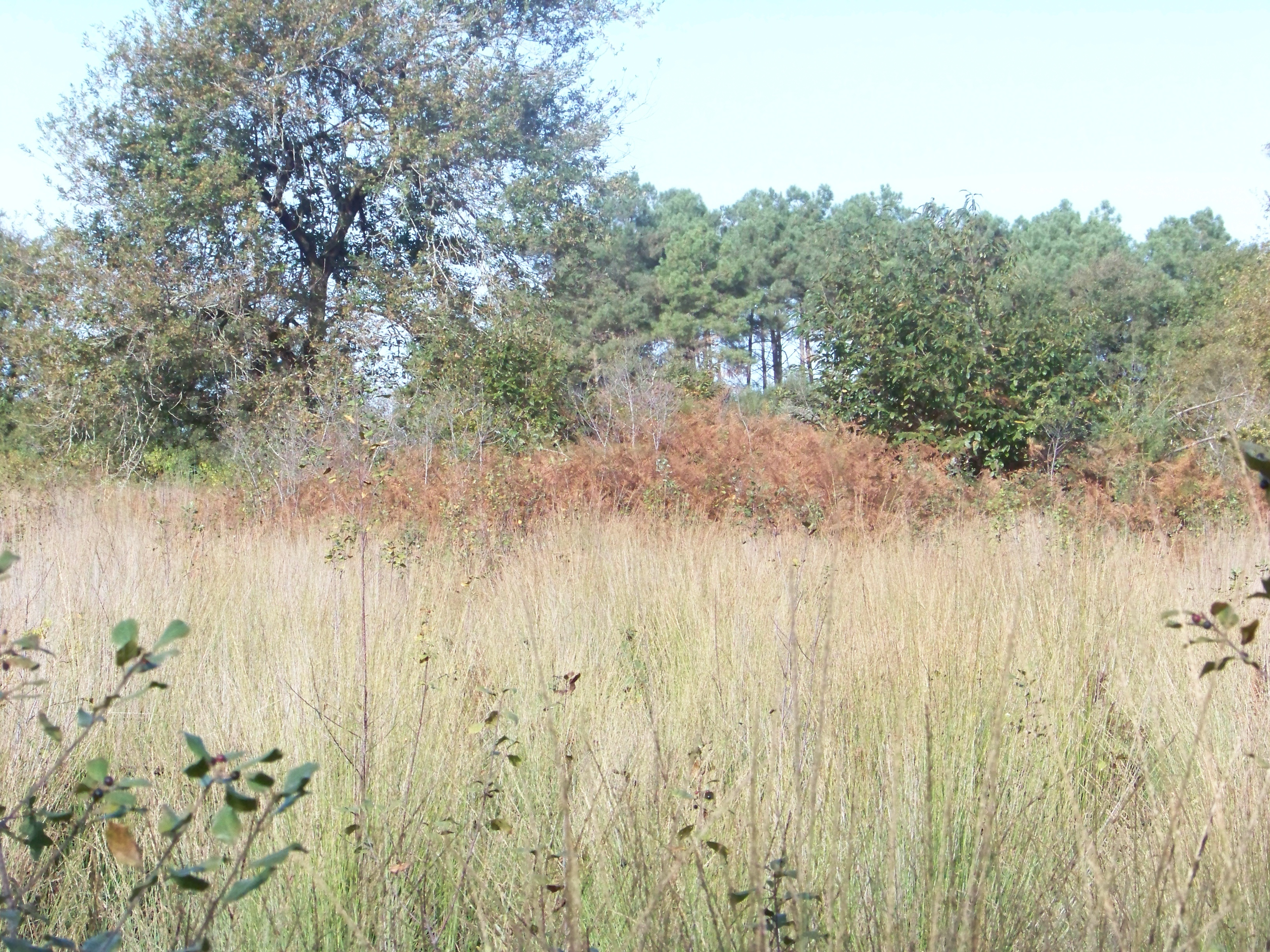
- Heath of Cazaou
- Location of Arboucave
- Location within France Location within Nouvelle-Aquitaine
- Coordinates: 43°36′48″N 0°26′04″W
- Country: France
- Region: Nouvelle-Aquitaine
- Department: Landes
- Arrondissement: Mont-de-Marsan
- Canton: Chalosse Tursan

Government
  - Mayor (2020–2026): Jean Laffitte
- Area^{1}: 9.89 km^{2} (3.82 sq mi)
- Elevation: 92 m (302 ft)
- Highest elevation: 170 m (560 ft)
- Lowest elevation: 86 m (282 ft)
- Population (2023): 220
  - Density: 22/km^{2} (58/sq mi)
- Time zone: UTC+01:00 (CET)
  - Summer (DST): UTC+02:00 (CEST)
- INSEE/Postal code: 40005 /40320
- ^{1} French Land Register data, which excludes lakes, ponds, glaciers > 1 km^{2} (0.386 sq mi or 247 acres) and river estuaries.

Arboucave (French pronunciation: [aʁbukav]; Gascon: Arbocava) is a commune of the Landes department in Nouvelle-Aquitaine in southwestern France.

== Population ==
Historical population
Year	Pop.	±% p.a.
1968	220	—
1975	205	−1.00%
1982	204	−0.07%
1990	202	−0.12%
1999	194	−0.45%
2007	192	−0.13%
2012	202	+1.02%
2017	201	−0.10%
2023	220	+1.52%
Source: INSEE

== See also ==
- Communes of the Landes department
