= Saint-Cricq-Chalosse =

- Commune
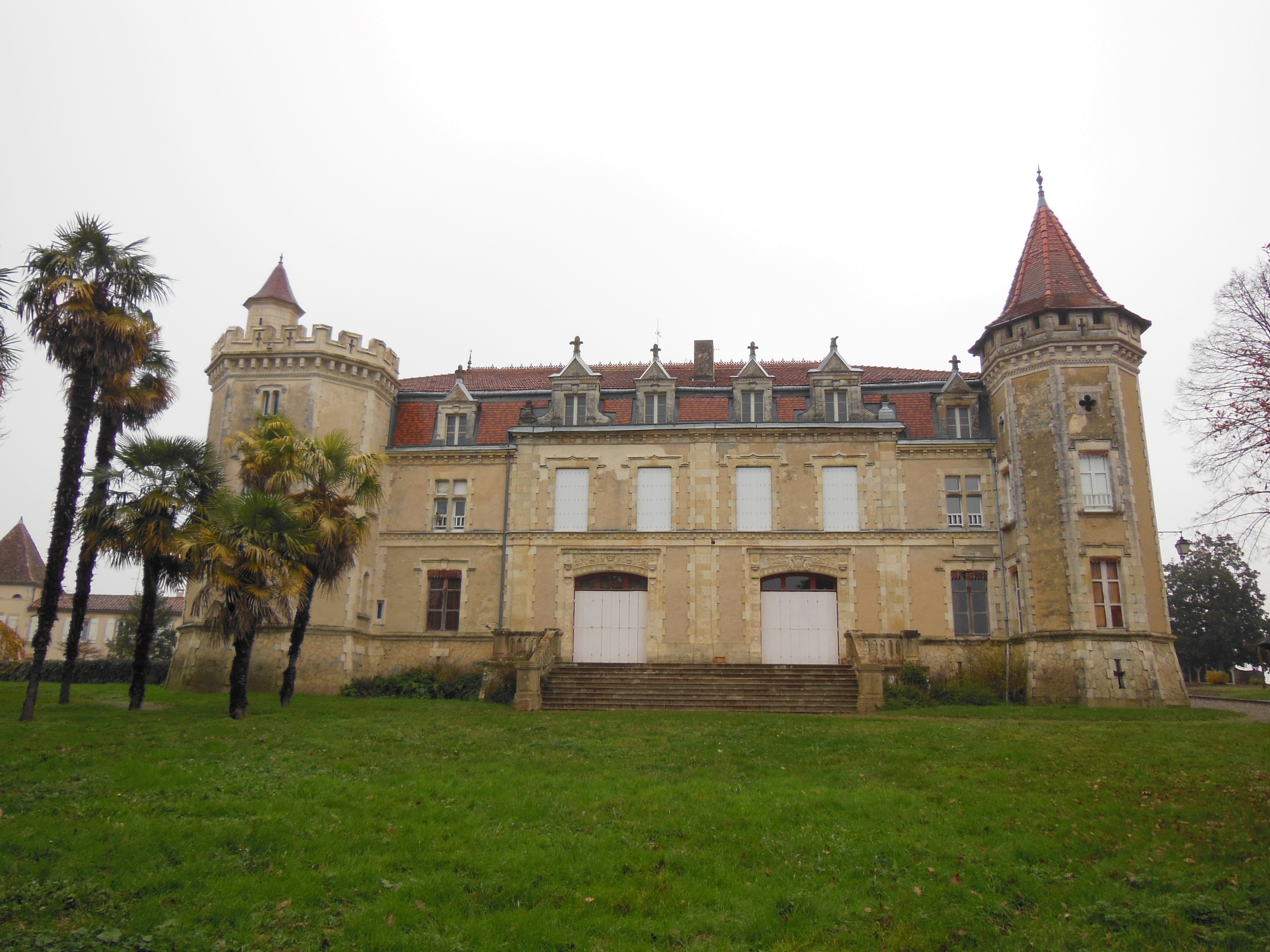
- Château

- Coat of arms
- Location of Saint-Cricq-Chalosse
- Location within France Location within Nouvelle-Aquitaine
- Coordinates: 43°39′19″N 0°41′01″W
- Country: France
- Region: Nouvelle-Aquitaine
- Department: Landes
- Arrondissement: Mont-de-Marsan
- Canton: Chalosse Tursan

Government
  - Mayor (2020–2026): Aimée Laborde
- Area^{1}: 20.23 km^{2} (7.81 sq mi)
- Elevation: 90 m (300 ft)
- Highest elevation: 128 m (420 ft)
- Lowest elevation: 50 m (160 ft)
- Population (2023): 614
  - Density: 30.4/km^{2} (78.6/sq mi)
- Time zone: UTC+01:00 (CET)
  - Summer (DST): UTC+02:00 (CEST)
- INSEE/Postal code: 40253 /40700
- ^{1} French Land Register data, which excludes lakes, ponds, glaciers > 1 km^{2} (0.386 sq mi or 247 acres) and river estuaries.

Saint-Cricq-Chalosse (French pronunciation: [sɛ̃ kʁik ʃalɔs]; Occitan: Sent Cric de Shalòssa) is a commune in the Landes department in Nouvelle-Aquitaine in southwestern France.

== Population ==
Historical population
Year	Pop.	±% p.a.
1968	576	—
1975	574	−0.05%
1982	568	−0.15%
1990	585	+0.37%
1999	561	−0.46%
2007	613	+1.11%
2012	642	+0.93%
2017	641	−0.03%
2023	614	−0.71%
Source: INSEE

== See also ==
- Communes of the Landes department
