= Puyol-Cazalet =

- Commune
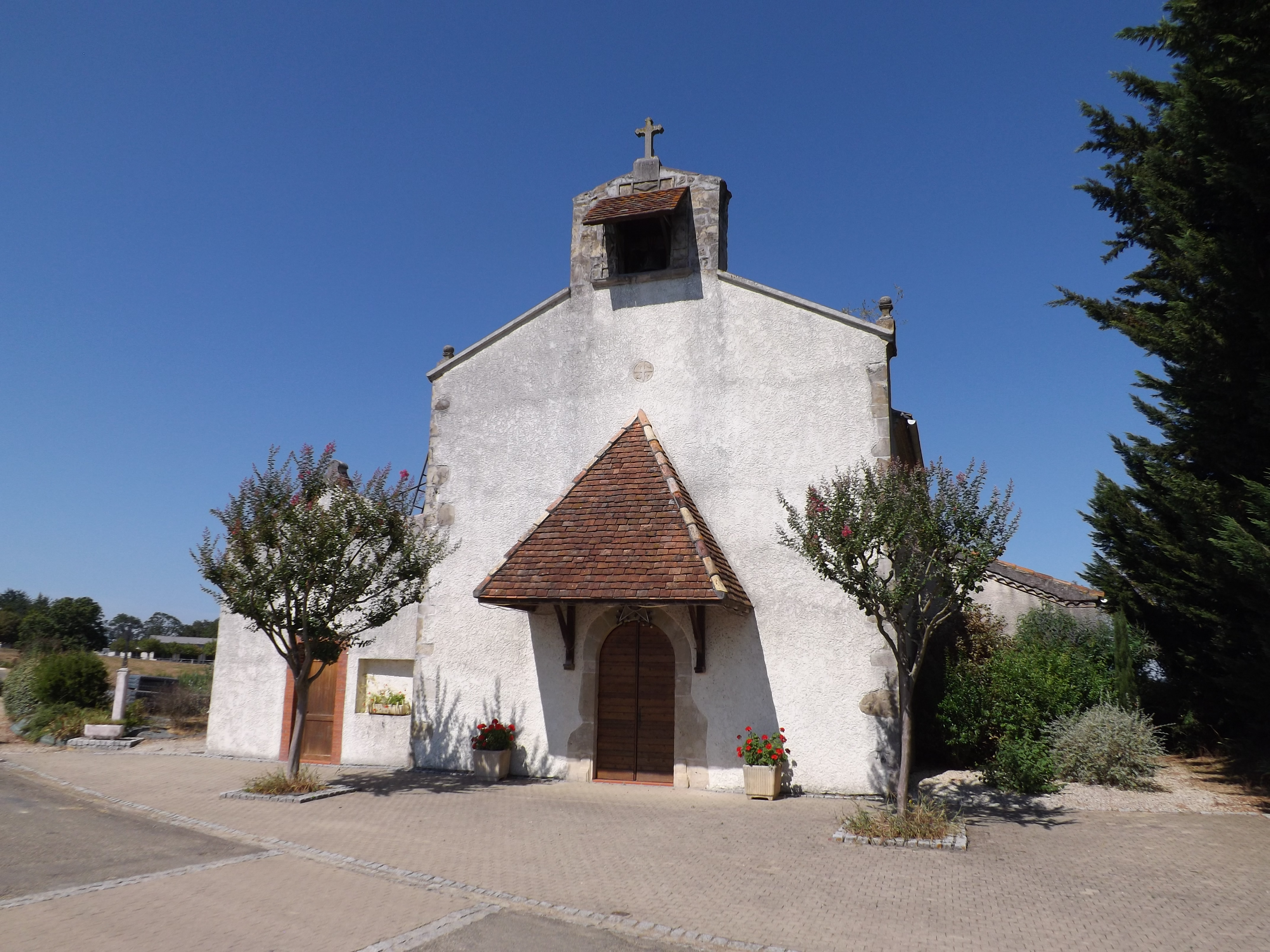
- Location of Puyol-Cazalet
- Location within France Location within Nouvelle-Aquitaine
- Coordinates: 43°36′18″N 0°24′21″W
- Country: France
- Region: Nouvelle-Aquitaine
- Department: Landes
- Arrondissement: Mont-de-Marsan
- Canton: Chalosse Tursan
- Intercommunality: Chalosse Tursan

Government
  - Mayor (2020–2026): Jacques Labenne
- Area^{1}: 4.59 km^{2} (1.77 sq mi)
- Elevation: 170 m (560 ft)
- Highest elevation: 167 m (548 ft)
- Lowest elevation: 90 m (300 ft)
- Population (2023): 105
  - Density: 22.9/km^{2} (59.2/sq mi)
- Time zone: UTC+01:00 (CET)
  - Summer (DST): UTC+02:00 (CEST)
- INSEE/Postal code: 40239 /40320
- ^{1} French Land Register data, which excludes lakes, ponds, glaciers > 1 km^{2} (0.386 sq mi or 247 acres) and river estuaries.

Puyol-Cazalet (French pronunciation: [pɥijɔl kazalɛ]; Occitan: Pujòu Casalet) is a commune in the Landes department in Nouvelle-Aquitaine in southwestern France.

== Population ==
Historical population
Year	Pop.	±% p.a.
1968	113	—
1975	105	−1.04%
1982	106	+0.14%
1990	105	−0.12%
1999	96	−0.99%
2007	106	+1.25%
2012	117	+1.99%
2017	108	−1.59%
2023	105	−0.47%
Source: INSEE

== See also ==
- Communes of the Landes department
