= Sarraziet =

- Commune
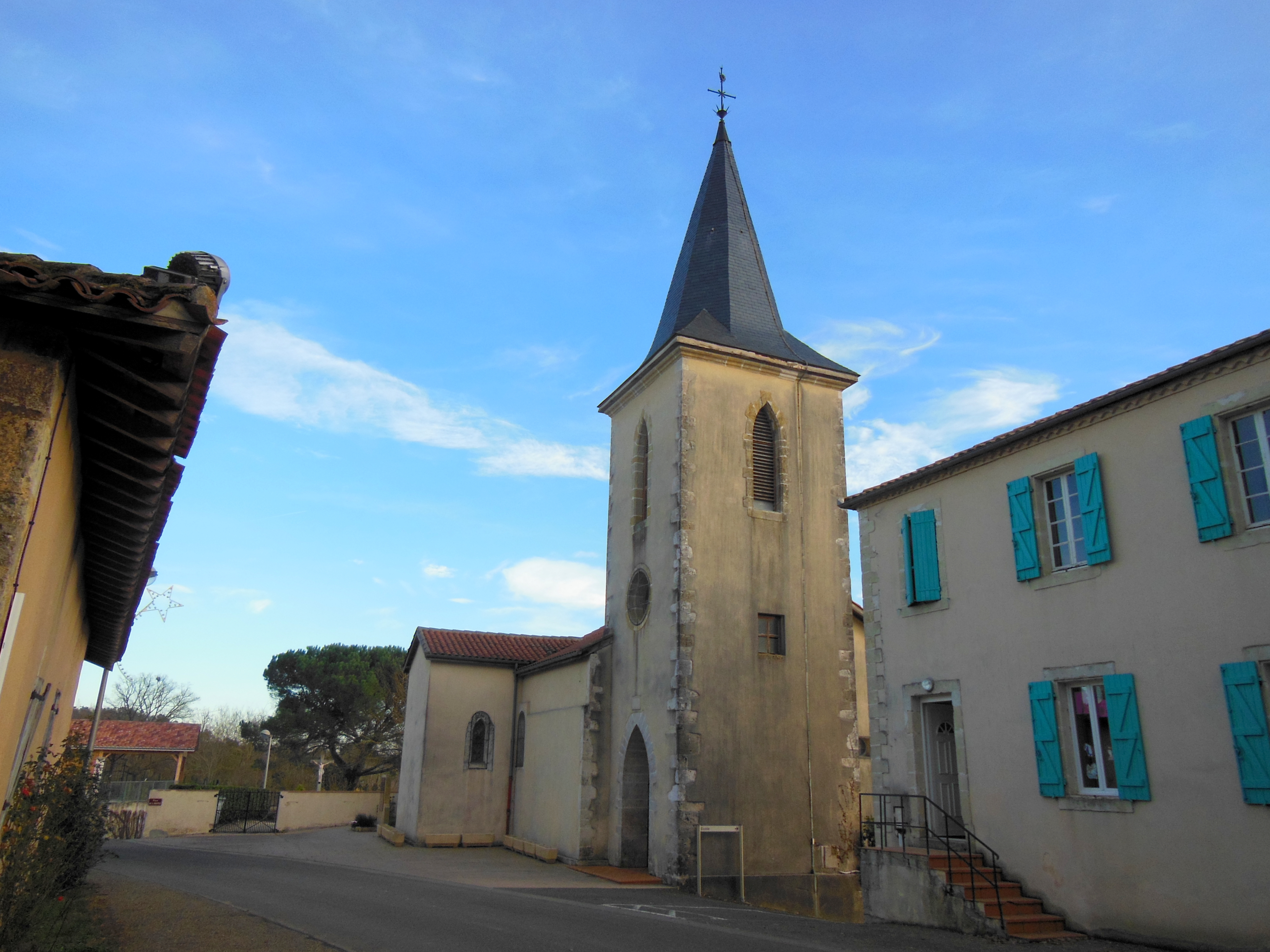
- Location of Sarraziet
- Location within France Location within Nouvelle-Aquitaine
- Coordinates: 43°42′13″N 0°29′17″W
- Country: France
- Region: Nouvelle-Aquitaine
- Department: Landes
- Arrondissement: Mont-de-Marsan
- Canton: Chalosse Tursan

Government
  - Mayor (2020–2026): Béatrice Makowiecki
- Area^{1}: 7.01 km^{2} (2.71 sq mi)
- Elevation: 136 m (446 ft)
- Highest elevation: 156 m (512 ft)
- Lowest elevation: 51 m (167 ft)
- Population (2023): 235
  - Density: 33.5/km^{2} (86.8/sq mi)
- Time zone: UTC+01:00 (CET)
  - Summer (DST): UTC+02:00 (CEST)
- INSEE/Postal code: 40289 /40500
- ^{1} French Land Register data, which excludes lakes, ponds, glaciers > 1 km^{2} (0.386 sq mi or 247 acres) and river estuaries.

Sarraziet (French pronunciation: [saʁazjɛ]; Gascon: Sarrasiet) is a commune in the Landes department in Nouvelle-Aquitaine in southwestern France.

== Population ==
Historical population
Year	Pop.	±% p.a.
1968	160	—
1975	161	+0.09%
1982	153	−0.73%
1990	161	+0.64%
1999	153	−0.56%
2007	195	+3.08%
2012	214	+1.88%
2017	240	+2.32%
2023	235	−0.35%
Source: INSEE

== See also ==
- Communes of the Landes department
