= Pécorade =

- Commune
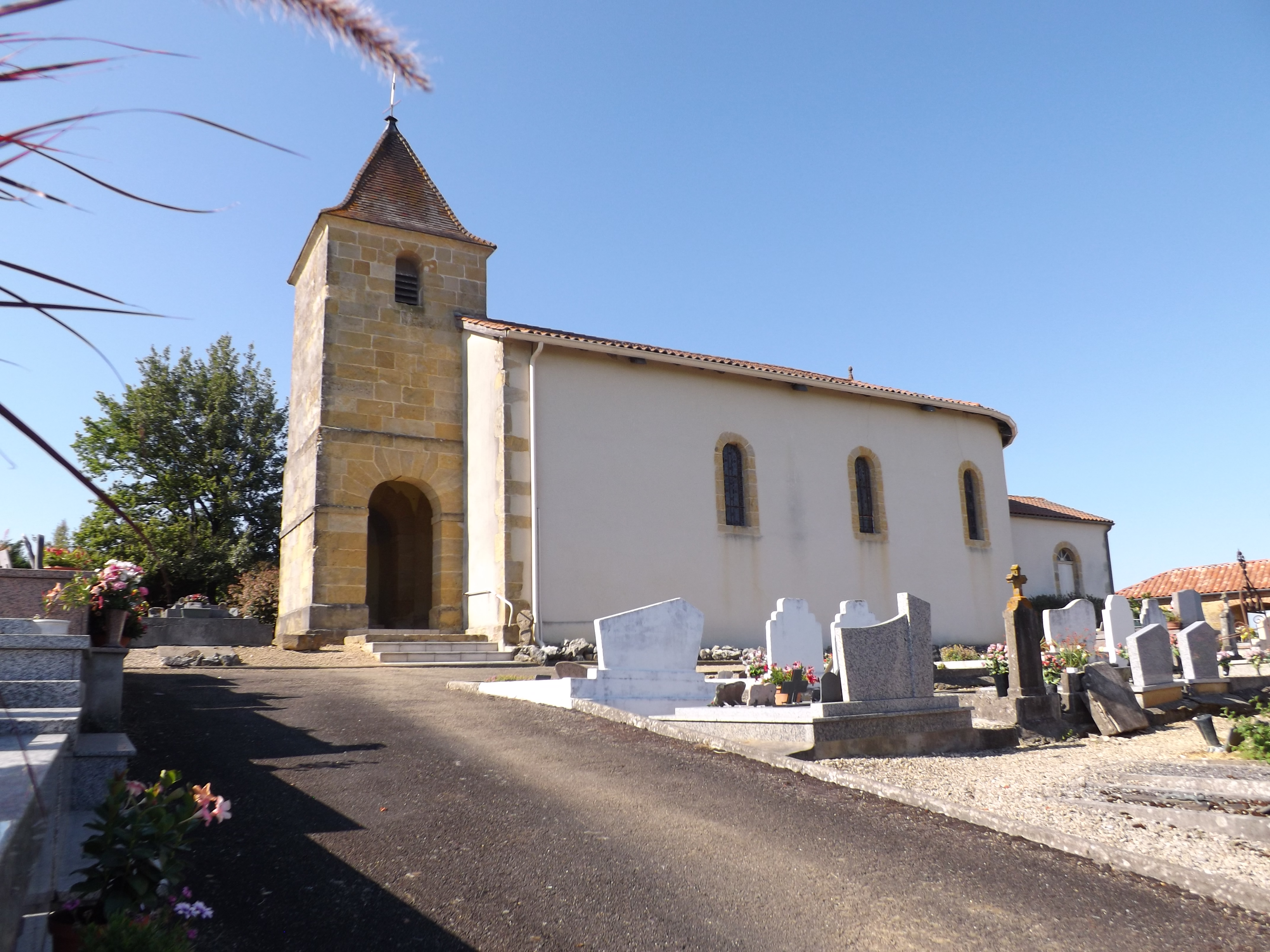
- Location of Pécorade
- Location within France Location within Nouvelle-Aquitaine
- Coordinates: 43°39′23″N 0°22′12″W
- Country: France
- Region: Nouvelle-Aquitaine
- Department: Landes
- Arrondissement: Mont-de-Marsan
- Canton: Chalosse Tursan

Government
  - Mayor (2020–2026): Michel Lafenëtre
- Area^{1}: 4.17 km^{2} (1.61 sq mi)
- Highest elevation: 175 m (574 ft)
- Lowest elevation: 95 m (312 ft)
- Population (2023): 133
  - Density: 31.9/km^{2} (82.6/sq mi)
- Time zone: UTC+01:00 (CET)
  - Summer (DST): UTC+02:00 (CEST)
- INSEE/Postal code: 40220 /40320
- ^{1} French Land Register data, which excludes lakes, ponds, glaciers > 1 km^{2} (0.386 sq mi or 247 acres) and river estuaries.

Pécorade (French pronunciation: [pekɔʁad]; Gascon: Pecorada) is a commune in the Landes department in Nouvelle-Aquitaine in southwestern France.

== Population ==
Historical population
Year	Pop.	±% p.a.
1968	147	—
1975	118	−3.09%
1982	123	+0.59%
1990	132	+0.89%
1999	164	+2.44%
2007	155	−0.70%
2012	152	−0.39%
2017	140	−1.63%
2023	133	−0.85%
Source: INSEE

== See also ==
- Communes of the Landes department
