= Poudenx =

- Commune
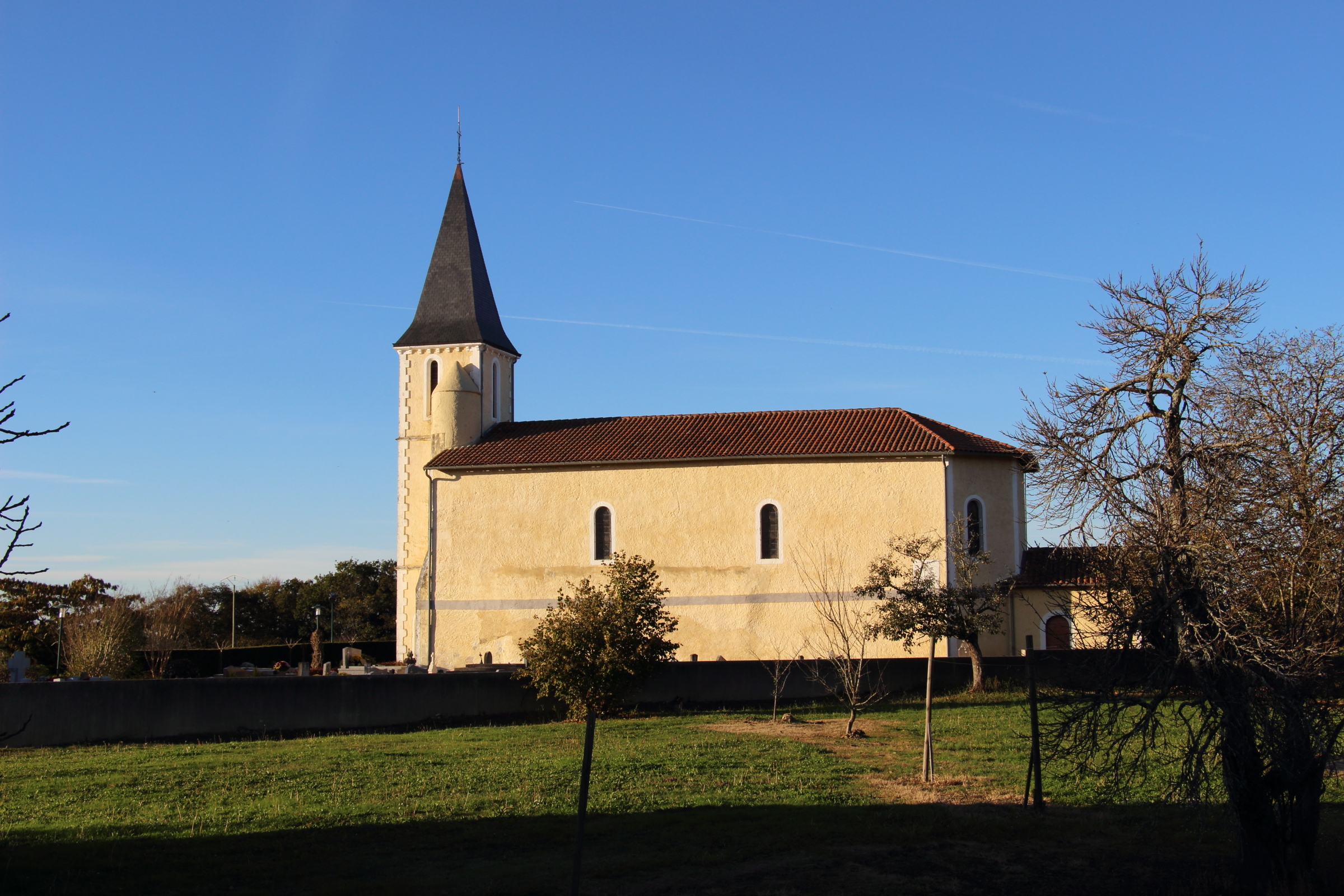
- Location of Poudenx
- Location within France Location within Nouvelle-Aquitaine
- Coordinates: 43°34′42″N 0°34′54″W
- Country: France
- Region: Nouvelle-Aquitaine
- Department: Landes
- Arrondissement: Mont-de-Marsan
- Canton: Chalosse Tursan
- Intercommunality: Chalosse Tursan

Government
  - Mayor (2020–2026): Francis Lalaude
- Area^{1}: 7.46 km^{2} (2.88 sq mi)
- Elevation: 144 m (472 ft)
- Highest elevation: 151 m (495 ft)
- Lowest elevation: 53 m (174 ft)
- Population (2023): 219
  - Density: 29.4/km^{2} (76.0/sq mi)
- Time zone: UTC+01:00 (CET)
  - Summer (DST): UTC+02:00 (CEST)
- INSEE/Postal code: 40232 /40700
- ^{1} French Land Register data, which excludes lakes, ponds, glaciers > 1 km^{2} (0.386 sq mi or 247 acres) and river estuaries.

Poudenx is a commune in the Landes department in Nouvelle-Aquitaine in southwestern France.

== Population ==
Historical population
Year	Pop.	±% p.a.
1968	239	—
1975	212	−1.70%
1982	196	−1.11%
1990	191	−0.32%
1999	203	+0.68%
2007	202	−0.06%
2012	234	+2.98%
2017	225	−0.78%
2023	219	−0.45%
Source: INSEE

== See also ==
- Communes of the Landes department
