= Castelnau-Tursan =

- Commune
- Location of Castelnau-Tursan
- Location within France Location within Nouvelle-Aquitaine
- Coordinates: 43°39′32″N 0°24′21″W
- Country: France
- Region: Nouvelle-Aquitaine
- Department: Landes
- Arrondissement: Mont-de-Marsan
- Canton: Chalosse Tursan

Government
  - Mayor (2020–2026): Roland Guichane
- Area^{1}: 9.27 km^{2} (3.58 sq mi)
- Elevation: 176 m (577 ft)
- Highest elevation: 179 m (587 ft)
- Lowest elevation: 74 m (243 ft)
- Population (2023): 182
  - Density: 19.6/km^{2} (50.8/sq mi)
- Time zone: UTC+01:00 (CET)
  - Summer (DST): UTC+02:00 (CEST)
- INSEE/Postal code: 40072 /40320
- ^{1} French Land Register data, which excludes lakes, ponds, glaciers > 1 km^{2} (0.386 sq mi or 247 acres) and river estuaries.

Castelnau-Tursan (French pronunciation: [kastɛlno tyʁsɑ̃]; Gascon: Castèthnau de Tursan) is a commune in the Landes department in Nouvelle-Aquitaine in southwestern France.

The wines of the surrounding countryside are known under the name Tursan.

== Population ==
Historical population
Year	Pop.	±% p.a.
1968	235	—
1975	231	−0.24%
1982	207	−1.55%
1990	192	−0.94%
1999	190	−0.12%
2007	183	−0.47%
2012	194	+1.17%
2017	193	−0.10%
2023	182	−0.97%
Source: INSEE

== See also ==
- Communes of the Landes department
