= Aubagnan =

- Commune
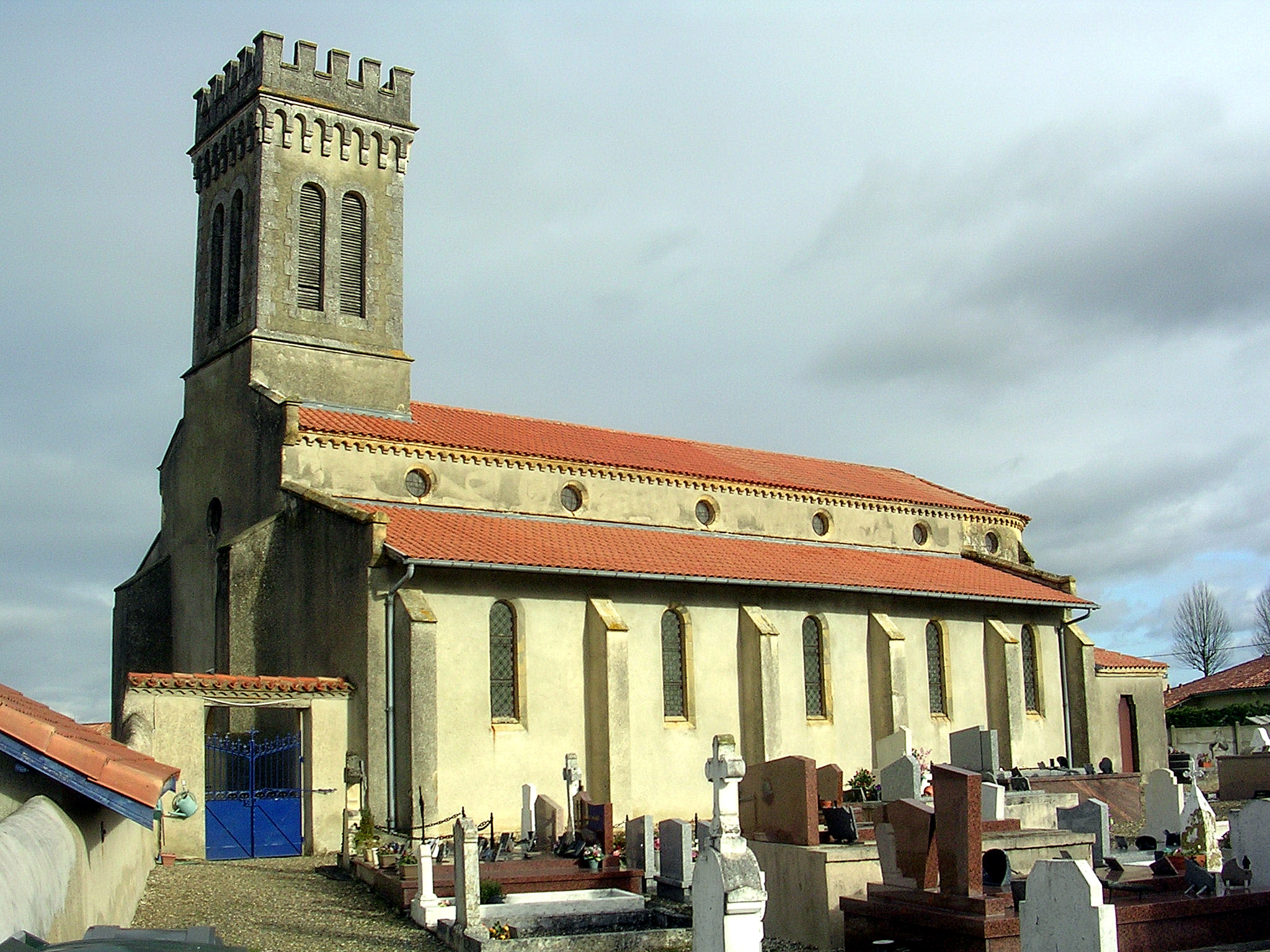
- The church of Aubagnan
- Location of Aubagnan
- Location within France Location within Nouvelle-Aquitaine
- Coordinates: 43°40′05″N 0°29′15″W
- Country: France
- Region: Nouvelle-Aquitaine
- Department: Landes
- Arrondissement: Mont-de-Marsan
- Canton: Chalosse Tursan
- Intercommunality: CC Chalosse Tursan

Government
  - Mayor (2020–2026): Vincent Darthos
- Area^{1}: 3.4 km^{2} (1.3 sq mi)
- Elevation: 134 m (440 ft)
- Highest elevation: 140 m (460 ft)
- Lowest elevation: 62 m (203 ft)
- Population (2023): 277
  - Density: 81/km^{2} (210/sq mi)
- Time zone: UTC+01:00 (CET)
  - Summer (DST): UTC+02:00 (CEST)
- INSEE/Postal code: 40016 /40700
- ^{1} French Land Register data, which excludes lakes, ponds, glaciers > 1 km^{2} (0.386 sq mi or 247 acres) and river estuaries.

Aubagnan (French pronunciation: [obaɲɑ̃]; Gascon: Aubanhan) is a commune of the Landes department in Nouvelle-Aquitaine in southwestern France.

== Population ==
Historical population
Year	Pop.	±% p.a.
1968	188	—
1975	206	+1.31%
1982	205	−0.07%
1990	226	+1.23%
1999	233	+0.34%
2007	235	+0.11%
2012	245	+0.84%
2017	250	+0.40%
2023	277	+1.72%
Source: INSEE

== See also ==
- Communes of the Landes department
