= Serres-Gaston =

- Commune
- Location of Serres-Gaston
- Location within France Location within Nouvelle-Aquitaine
- Coordinates: 43°39′28″N 0°30′55″W
- Country: France
- Region: Nouvelle-Aquitaine
- Department: Landes
- Arrondissement: Mont-de-Marsan
- Canton: Chalosse Tursan

Government
  - Mayor (2020–2026): Didier Dufourcq
- Area^{1}: 8.88 km^{2} (3.43 sq mi)
- Elevation: 108 m (354 ft)
- Highest elevation: 142 m (466 ft)
- Lowest elevation: 52 m (171 ft)
- Population (2023): 405
  - Density: 45.6/km^{2} (118/sq mi)
- Time zone: UTC+01:00 (CET)
  - Summer (DST): UTC+02:00 (CEST)
- INSEE/Postal code: 40298 /40700
- ^{1} French Land Register data, which excludes lakes, ponds, glaciers > 1 km^{2} (0.386 sq mi or 247 acres) and river estuaries.

Serres-Gaston (French pronunciation: [sɛʁ ɡastɔ̃]; Gascon: Sèrras Gaston) is a commune in the Landes department in Nouvelle-Aquitaine in southwestern France.

== Population ==
Historical population
| Year | Pop. | ±% p.a. |
|---|---|---|
| 1968 | 319 | — |
| 1975 | 316 | −0.13% |
| 1982 | 320 | +0.18% |
| 1990 | 328 | +0.31% |
| 1999 | 340 | +0.40% |
| 2007 | 355 | +0.54% |
| 2012 | 370 | +0.83% |
| 2017 | 394 | +1.26% |
| 2023 | 405 | +0.46% |
Source: INSEE

== See also ==
- Communes of the Landes department
