= Cazalis, Landes =

Cazalis
- Commune
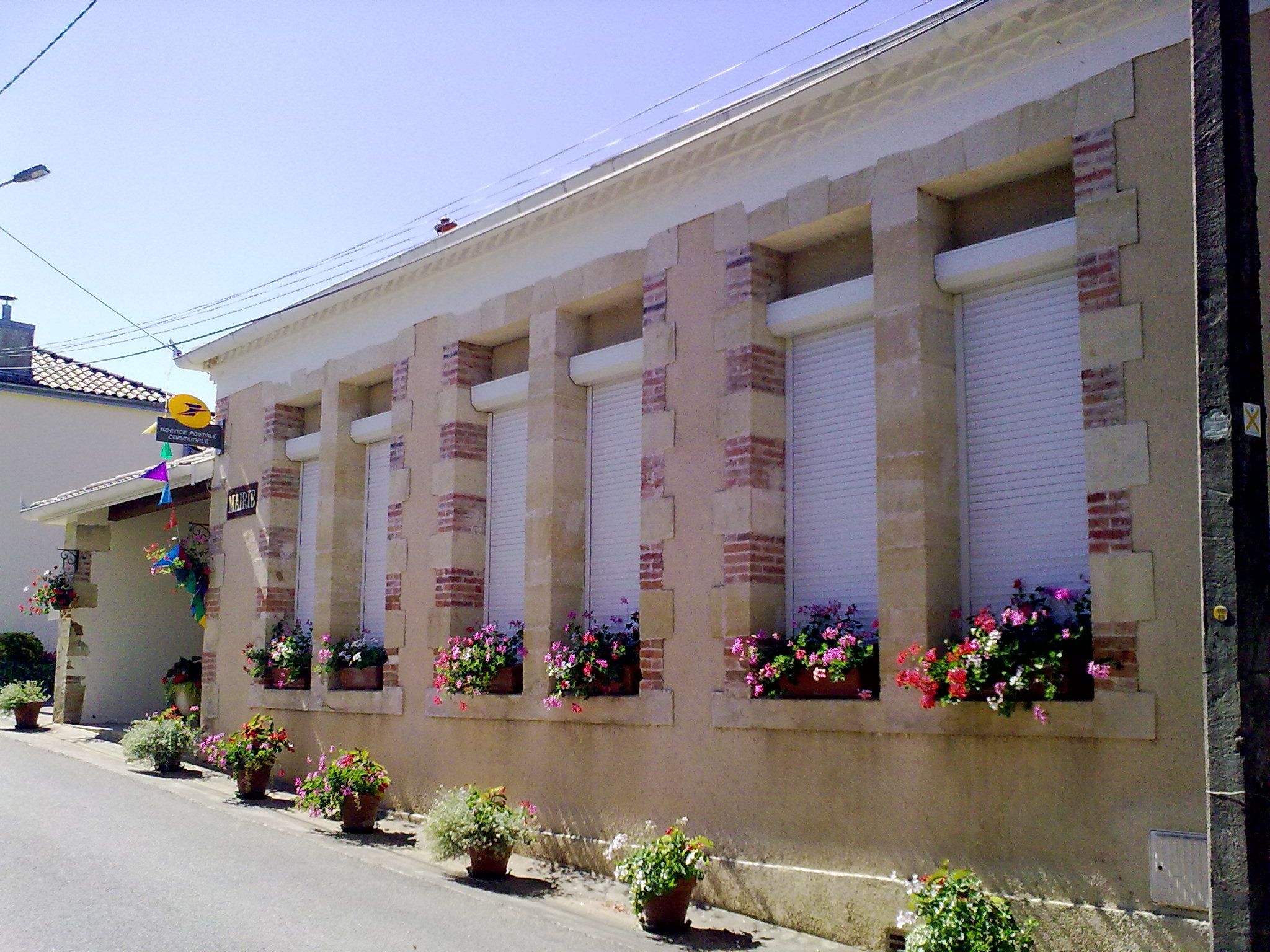
- Town hall
- Location of Cazalis
- Location within France Location within Nouvelle-Aquitaine
- Coordinates: 43°37′32″N 0°39′38″W
- Country: France
- Region: Nouvelle-Aquitaine
- Department: Landes
- Arrondissement: Mont-de-Marsan
- Canton: Chalosse Tursan

Government
  - Mayor (2021–2026): Didier Castets
- Area^{1}: 5.13 km^{2} (1.98 sq mi)
- Elevation: 100 m (330 ft)
- Highest elevation: 127 m (417 ft)
- Lowest elevation: 40 m (130 ft)
- Population (2023): 136
  - Density: 26.5/km^{2} (68.7/sq mi)
- Time zone: UTC+01:00 (CET)
  - Summer (DST): UTC+02:00 (CEST)
- INSEE/Postal code: 40079 /40700
- ^{1} French Land Register data, which excludes lakes, ponds, glaciers > 1 km^{2} (0.386 sq mi or 247 acres) and river estuaries.

Cazalis (French pronunciation: [kazalis]; Occitan: Casalís) is a commune in the Landes department in Nouvelle-Aquitaine in southwestern France.

== Population ==
Historical population
Year	Pop.	±% p.a.
1968	165	—
1975	167	+0.17%
1982	157	−0.88%
1990	132	−2.14%
1999	134	+0.17%
2007	137	+0.28%
2012	150	+1.83%
2017	134	−2.23%
2023	136	+0.25%
Source: INSEE

== See also ==
- Communes of the Landes department
