= Montsoué =

- Commune
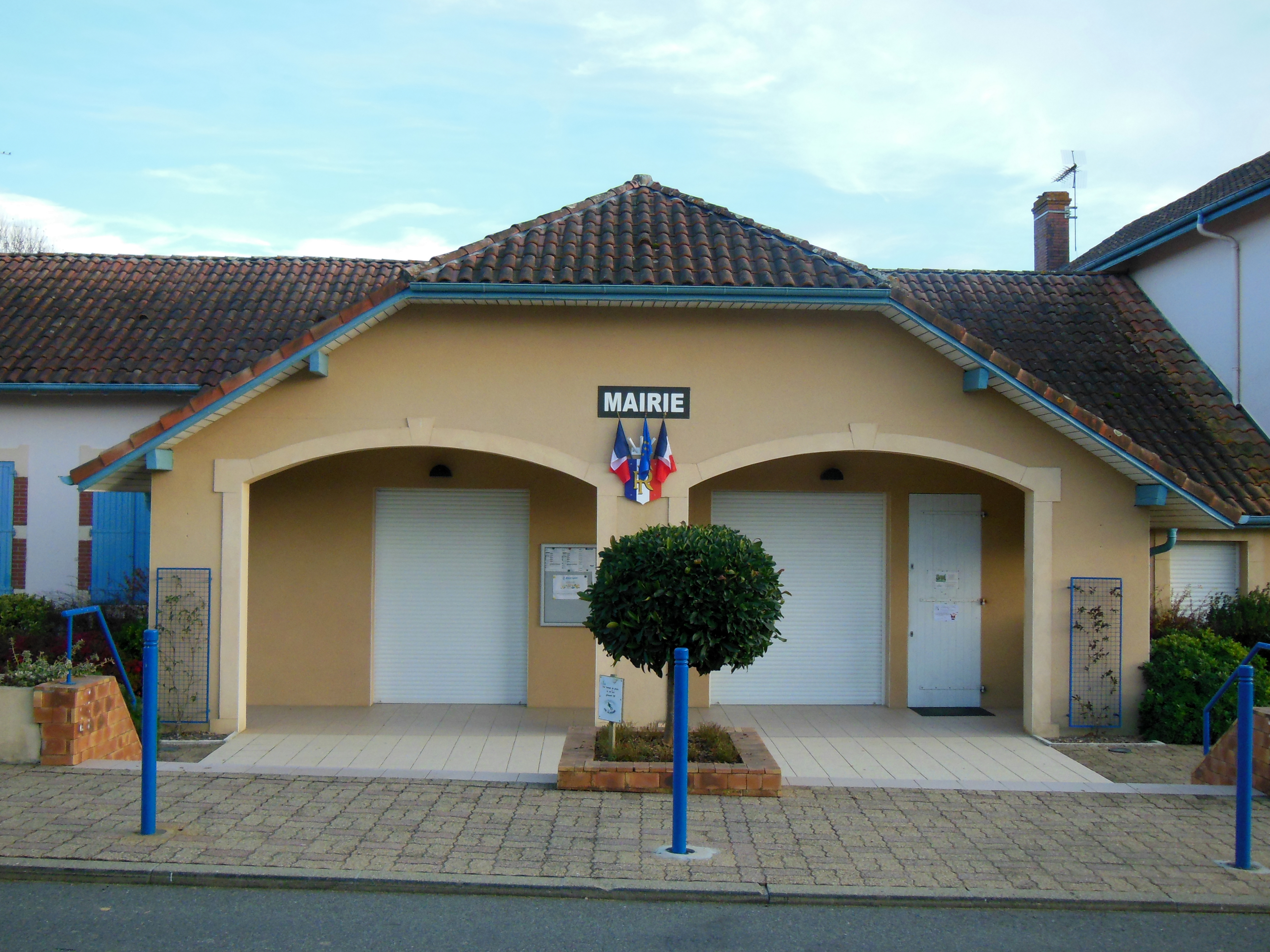
- Town hall
- Location of Montsoué
- Location within France Location within Nouvelle-Aquitaine
- Coordinates: 43°43′56″N 0°30′19″W
- Country: France
- Region: Nouvelle-Aquitaine
- Department: Landes
- Arrondissement: Mont-de-Marsan
- Canton: Chalosse Tursan

Government
  - Mayor (2020–2026): Jean-Jacques Dehez
- Area^{1}: 17.98 km^{2} (6.94 sq mi)
- Elevation: 110 m (360 ft)
- Highest elevation: 166 m (545 ft)
- Lowest elevation: 45 m (148 ft)
- Population (2023): 566
  - Density: 31.5/km^{2} (81.5/sq mi)
- Time zone: UTC+01:00 (CET)
  - Summer (DST): UTC+02:00 (CEST)
- INSEE/Postal code: 40196 /40500
- ^{1} French Land Register data, which excludes lakes, ponds, glaciers > 1 km^{2} (0.386 sq mi or 247 acres) and river estuaries.

Montsoué (French pronunciation: [mɔ̃swe]；Occitan: Montsoèr) is a commune in the Landes department in Nouvelle-Aquitaine in southwestern France.

== Population ==
Historical population
Year	Pop.	±% p.a.
1968	542	—
1975	465	−2.17%
1982	458	−0.22%
1990	538	+2.03%
1999	558	+0.41%
2007	565	+0.16%
2012	577	+0.42%
2017	570	−0.24%
2023	566	−0.12%
Source: INSEE

== See also ==
- Communes of the Landes department
