= Sainte-Colombe, Landes =

Sainte-Colombe
- Commune
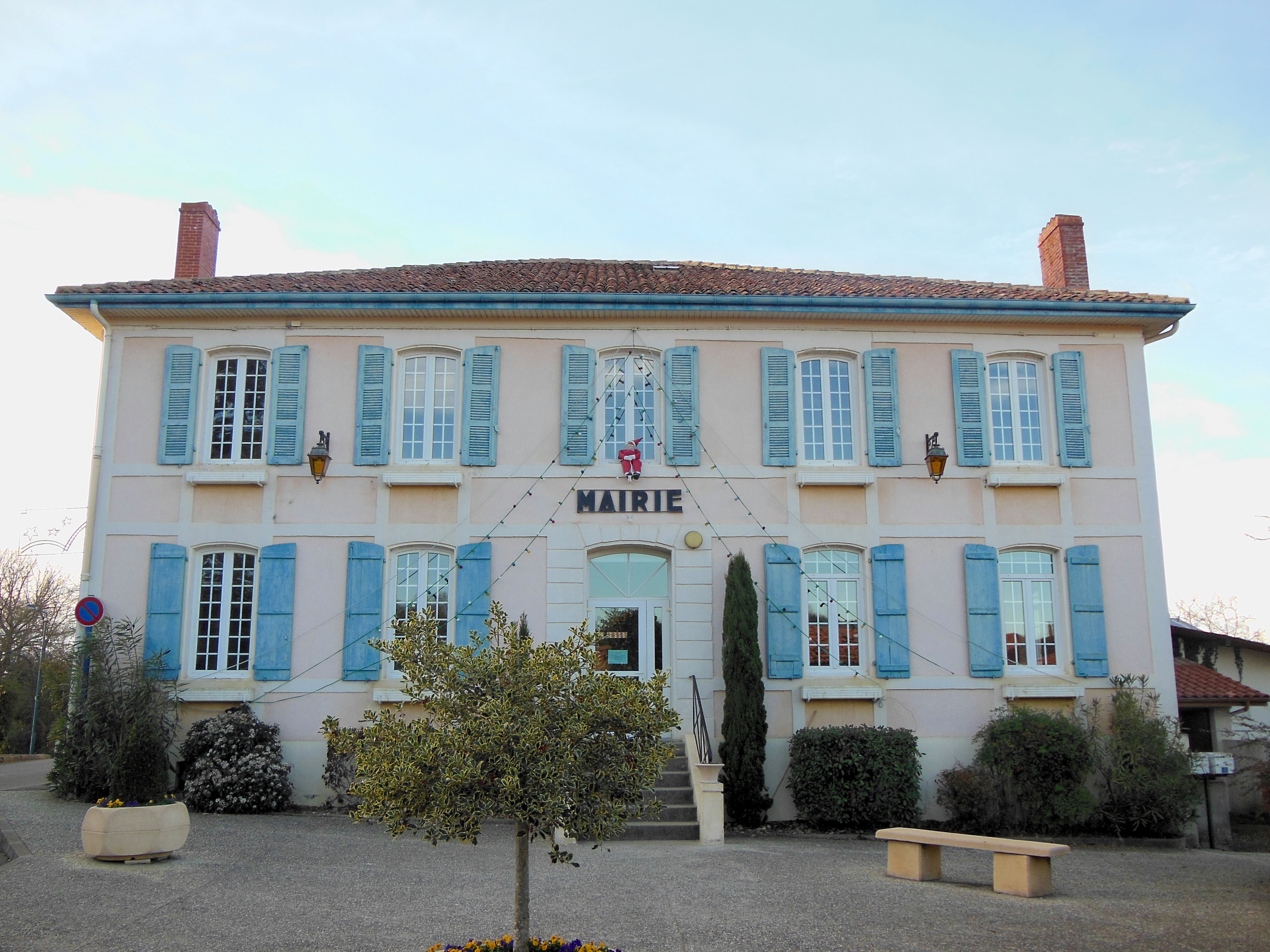
- Town hall
- Location of Sainte-Colombe
- Location within France Location within Nouvelle-Aquitaine
- Coordinates: 43°40′57″N 0°33′20″W
- Country: France
- Region: Nouvelle-Aquitaine
- Department: Landes
- Arrondissement: Mont-de-Marsan
- Canton: Chalosse Tursan

Government
  - Mayor (2020–2026): Philippe Dutoya
- Area^{1}: 12.79 km^{2} (4.94 sq mi)
- Elevation: 75 m (246 ft)
- Highest elevation: 139 m (456 ft)
- Lowest elevation: 50 m (160 ft)
- Population (2023): 633
  - Density: 49.5/km^{2} (128/sq mi)
- Time zone: UTC+01:00 (CET)
  - Summer (DST): UTC+02:00 (CEST)
- INSEE/Postal code: 40252 /40700
- ^{1} French Land Register data, which excludes lakes, ponds, glaciers > 1 km^{2} (0.386 sq mi or 247 acres) and river estuaries.

Sainte-Colombe (French pronunciation: [sɛ̃t kɔlɔ̃b]; Gascon: Senta Coloma) is a commune in the Landes department in Nouvelle-Aquitaine in southwestern France.

== Population ==
Historical population
Year	Pop.	±% p.a.
1968	432	—
1975	392	−1.38%
1982	373	−0.71%
1990	407	+1.10%
1999	456	+1.27%
2007	608	+3.66%
2012	668	+1.90%
2017	666	−0.06%
2023	633	−0.84%
Source: INSEE

== See also ==
- Communes of the Landes department
