= Montaut, Landes =

Montaut
- Commune
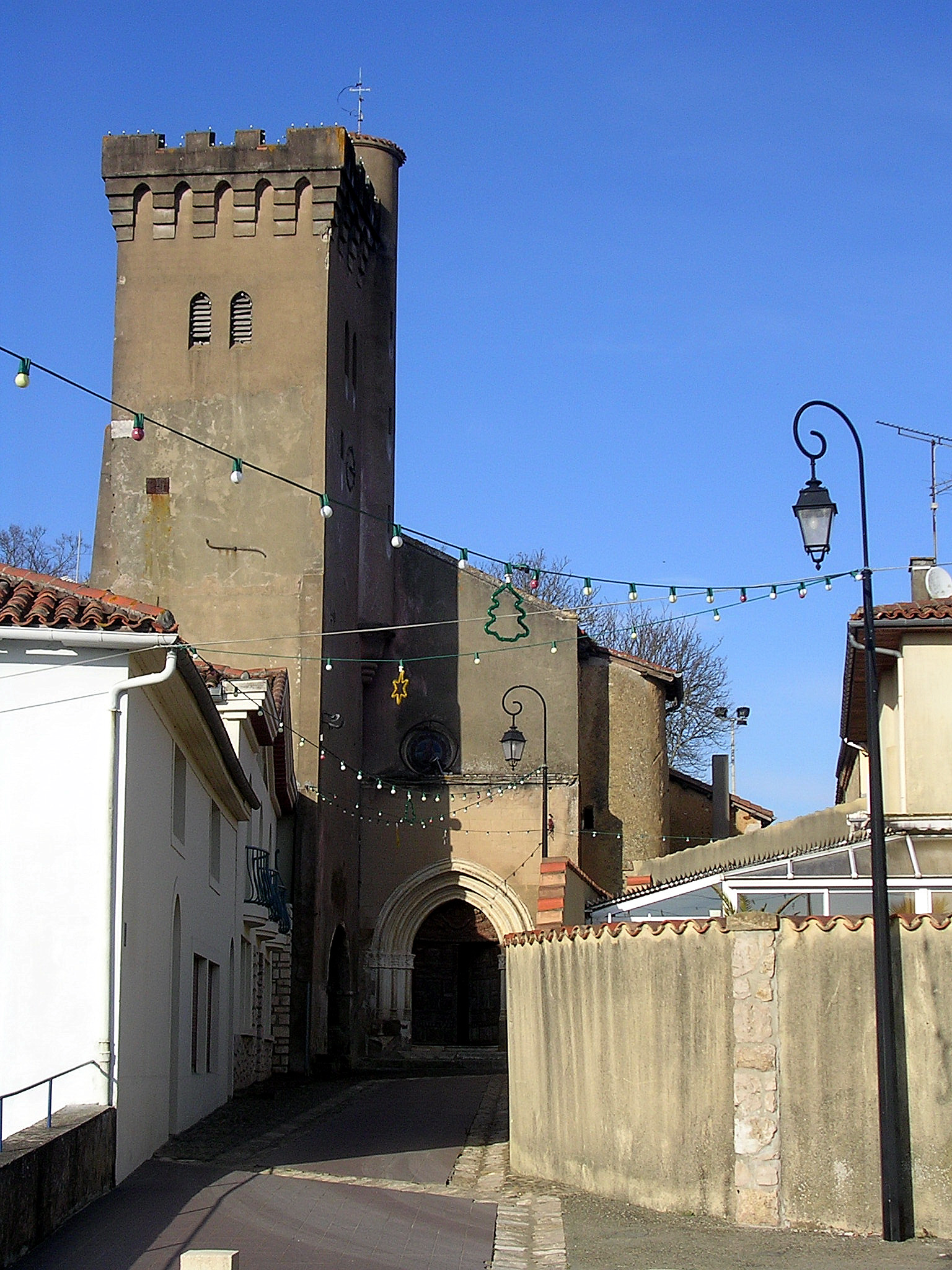
- The church in Montaut

- Coat of arms
- Location of Montaut
- Location within France Location within Nouvelle-Aquitaine
- Coordinates: 43°44′30″N 0°39′18″W
- Country: France
- Region: Nouvelle-Aquitaine
- Department: Landes
- Arrondissement: Mont-de-Marsan
- Canton: Chalosse Tursan
- Intercommunality: Chalosse Tursan

Government
  - Mayor (2020–2026): Anne-Marie Larrere
- Area^{1}: 14.88 km^{2} (5.75 sq mi)
- Elevation: 125 m (410 ft)
- Highest elevation: 121 m (397 ft)
- Lowest elevation: 25 m (82 ft)
- Population (2023): 594
  - Density: 39.9/km^{2} (103/sq mi)
- Time zone: UTC+01:00 (CET)
  - Summer (DST): UTC+02:00 (CEST)
- INSEE/Postal code: 40191 /40500
- ^{1} French Land Register data, which excludes lakes, ponds, glaciers > 1 km^{2} (0.386 sq mi or 247 acres) and river estuaries.

Montaut (French pronunciation: [mɔ̃to]) is a commune in the Landes department in Nouvelle-Aquitaine in south-western France.

== See also ==
- Communes of the Landes department
