= Monségur, Landes =

Monségur
- Commune
- Location of Monségur
- Location within France Location within Nouvelle-Aquitaine
- Coordinates: 43°36′19″N 0°32′25″W
- Country: France
- Region: Nouvelle-Aquitaine
- Department: Landes
- Arrondissement: Mont-de-Marsan
- Canton: Chalosse Tursan
- Intercommunality: Chalosse Tursan

Government
  - Mayor (2020–2026): Dominique Cazaubieilh
- Area^{1}: 19.69 km^{2} (7.60 sq mi)
- Elevation: 110 m (360 ft)
- Highest elevation: 151 m (495 ft)
- Lowest elevation: 60 m (200 ft)
- Population (2023): 395
  - Density: 20.1/km^{2} (52.0/sq mi)
- Time zone: UTC+01:00 (CET)
  - Summer (DST): UTC+02:00 (CEST)
- INSEE/Postal code: 40190 /40700
- ^{1} French Land Register data, which excludes lakes, ponds, glaciers > 1 km^{2} (0.386 sq mi or 247 acres) and river estuaries.

Monségur (French pronunciation: [mɔ̃seɡyʁ]; Occitan: Montsegur) is a commune in the Landes department in Nouvelle-Aquitaine in south-western France.

== See also ==
- Communes of the Landes department
