= Lacajunte =

- Commune
- Coat of arms
- Location of Lacajunte
- Location within France Location within Nouvelle-Aquitaine
- Coordinates: 43°35′39″N 0°25′26″W
- Country: France
- Region: Nouvelle-Aquitaine
- Department: Landes
- Arrondissement: Mont-de-Marsan
- Canton: Chalosse Tursan
- Intercommunality: Chalosse Tursan

Government
  - Mayor (2020–2026): Christian Boulin
- Area^{1}: 5.63 km^{2} (2.17 sq mi)
- Elevation: 175 m (574 ft)
- Highest elevation: 174 m (571 ft)
- Lowest elevation: 94 m (308 ft)
- Population (2023): 144
  - Density: 25.6/km^{2} (66.2/sq mi)
- Time zone: UTC+01:00 (CET)
  - Summer (DST): UTC+02:00 (CEST)
- INSEE/Postal code: 40136 /40320
- ^{1} French Land Register data, which excludes lakes, ponds, glaciers > 1 km^{2} (0.386 sq mi or 247 acres) and river estuaries.

Lacajunte (French pronunciation: [lakaʒœ̃t]; Gascon: La Cau Junta) is a commune in the Landes department in Nouvelle-Aquitaine in south-western France.

== See also ==
- Communes of the Landes department
