= Sorbets, Landes =

Sorbets
- Commune
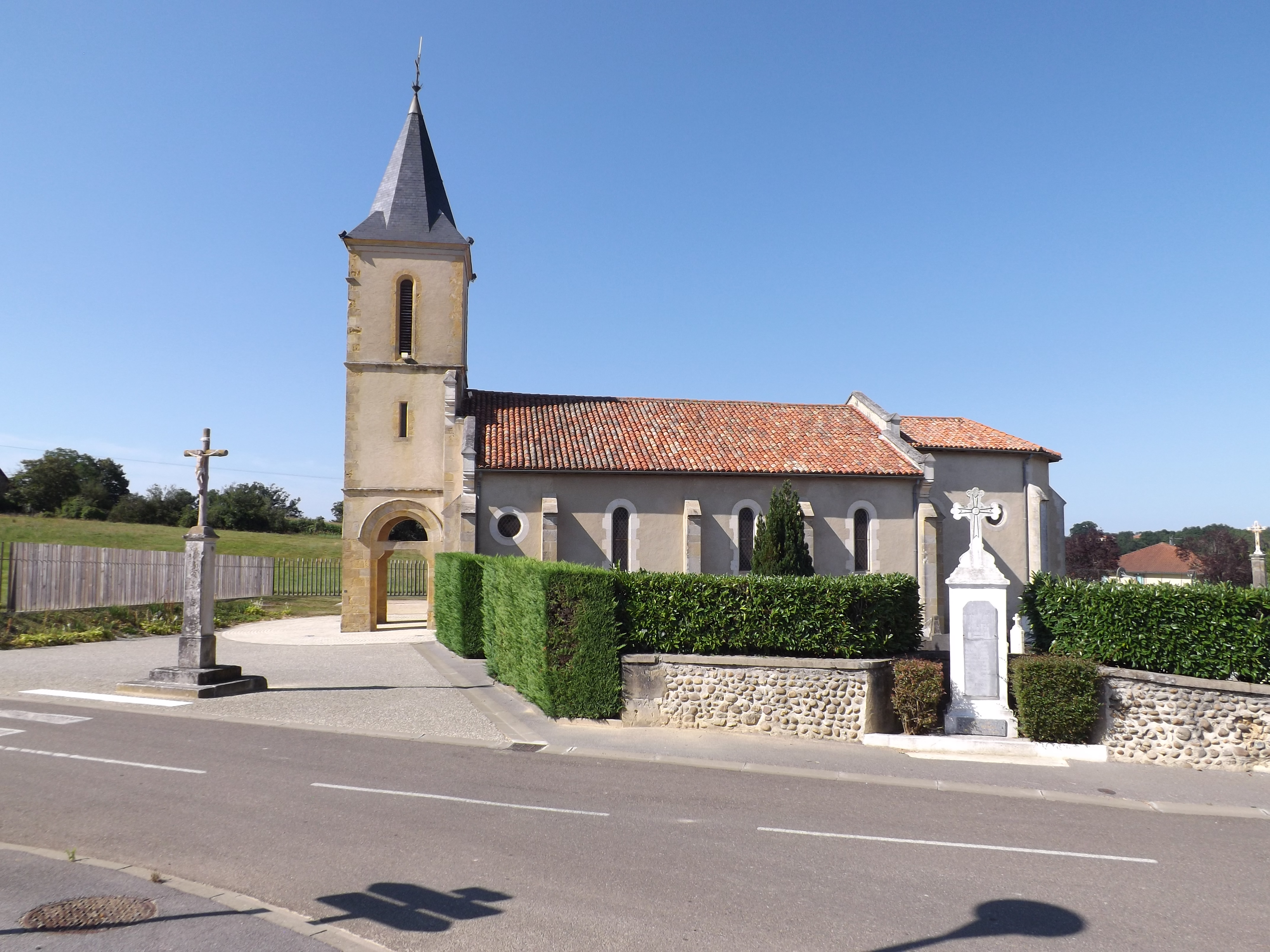
- Location of Sorbets
- Location within France Location within Nouvelle-Aquitaine
- Coordinates: 43°38′11″N 0°19′42″W
- Country: France
- Region: Nouvelle-Aquitaine
- Department: Landes
- Arrondissement: Mont-de-Marsan
- Canton: Chalosse Tursan

Government
  - Mayor (2020–2026): Gilbert Dubicq
- Area^{1}: 11.88 km^{2} (4.59 sq mi)
- Elevation: 190 m (620 ft)
- Highest elevation: 218 m (715 ft)
- Lowest elevation: 105 m (344 ft)
- Population (2023): 198
  - Density: 16.7/km^{2} (43.2/sq mi)
- Time zone: UTC+01:00 (CET)
  - Summer (DST): UTC+02:00 (CEST)
- INSEE/Postal code: 40305 /40320
- ^{1} French Land Register data, which excludes lakes, ponds, glaciers > 1 km^{2} (0.386 sq mi or 247 acres) and river estuaries.

Sorbets is a commune in the Landes department in Nouvelle-Aquitaine in southwestern France.

== Population ==
Historical population
Year	Pop.	±% p.a.
1968	225	—
1975	208	−1.12%
1982	199	−0.63%
1990	179	−1.32%
1999	170	−0.57%
2007	187	+1.20%
2012	191	+0.42%
2017	197	+0.62%
2023	198	+0.08%
Source: INSEE

== See also ==
- Communes of the Landes department
