= Lacrabe =

- Commune
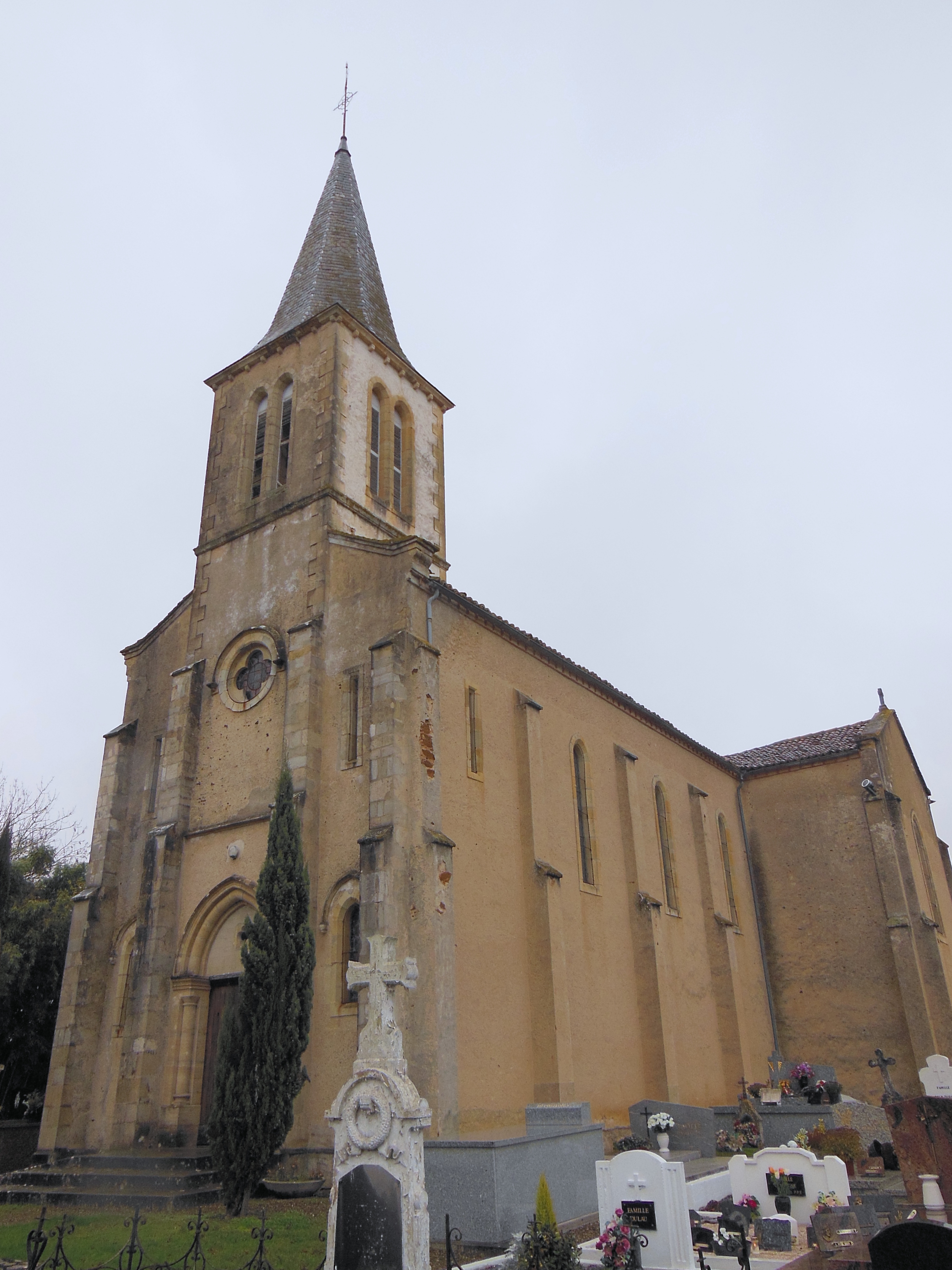
- The church in Lacrabe
- Location of Lacrabe
- Location within France Location within Nouvelle-Aquitaine
- Coordinates: 43°36′59″N 0°35′22″W
- Country: France
- Region: Nouvelle-Aquitaine
- Department: Landes
- Arrondissement: Mont-de-Marsan
- Canton: Chalosse Tursan
- Intercommunality: Chalosse Tursan

Government
  - Mayor (2020–2026): Philippe Teulé
- Area^{1}: 6.27 km^{2} (2.42 sq mi)
- Elevation: 110 m (360 ft)
- Highest elevation: 135 m (443 ft)
- Lowest elevation: 49 m (161 ft)
- Population (2023): 287
  - Density: 45.8/km^{2} (119/sq mi)
- Time zone: UTC+01:00 (CET)
  - Summer (DST): UTC+02:00 (CEST)
- INSEE/Postal code: 40138 /40700
- ^{1} French Land Register data, which excludes lakes, ponds, glaciers > 1 km^{2} (0.386 sq mi or 247 acres) and river estuaries.

Lacrabe (French pronunciation: [lakʁab]; Occitan: La Craba) is a commune in the Landes department in Nouvelle-Aquitaine in south-western France.

== See also ==
- Communes of the Landes department
