= Samadet =

- Commune
- Location of Samadet
- Location within France Location within Nouvelle-Aquitaine
- Coordinates: 43°38′23″N 0°29′08″W
- Country: France
- Region: Nouvelle-Aquitaine
- Department: Landes
- Arrondissement: Mont-de-Marsan
- Canton: Chalosse Tursan

Government
  - Mayor (2020–2026): Bernard Tastet
- Area^{1}: 26.19 km^{2} (10.11 sq mi)
- Elevation: 110 m (360 ft)
- Highest elevation: 185 m (607 ft)
- Lowest elevation: 70 m (230 ft)
- Population (2023): 1,123
  - Density: 42.88/km^{2} (111.1/sq mi)
- Time zone: UTC+01:00 (CET)
  - Summer (DST): UTC+02:00 (CEST)
- INSEE/Postal code: 40286 /40320
- ^{1} French Land Register data, which excludes lakes, ponds, glaciers > 1 km^{2} (0.386 sq mi or 247 acres) and river estuaries.

Samadet (French pronunciation: [samadɛ]; Gascon: Samadèth) is a commune in the Landes department in Nouvelle-Aquitaine in southwestern France.

== Population ==
Historical population
Year	Pop.	±% p.a.
1968	1,073	—
1975	1,030	−0.58%
1982	970	−0.85%
1990	1,009	+0.49%
1999	1,010	+0.01%
2007	1,027	+0.21%
2012	1,113	+1.62%
2017	1,152	+0.69%
2023	1,123	−0.42%
Source: INSEE

== See also ==
- Communes of the Landes department
