= Lauret, Landes =

Lauret
- Commune
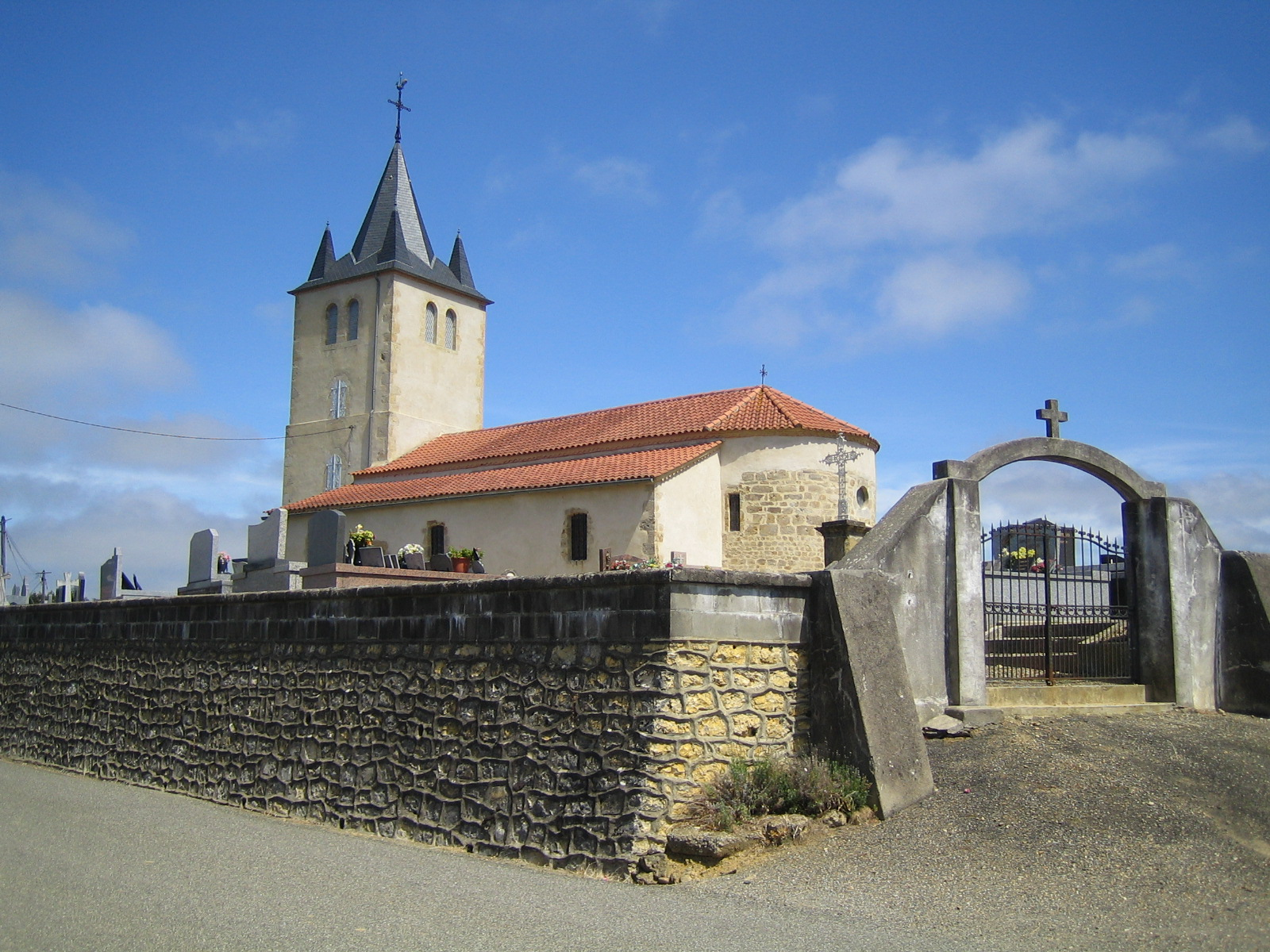
- The church in Lauret
- Location of Lauret
- Location within France Location within Nouvelle-Aquitaine
- Coordinates: 43°33′50″N 0°20′34″W
- Country: France
- Region: Nouvelle-Aquitaine
- Department: Landes
- Arrondissement: Mont-de-Marsan
- Canton: Chalosse Tursan
- Intercommunality: Chalosse Tursan

Government
  - Mayor (2020–2026): Stéphane Cabanne
- Area^{1}: 7.34 km^{2} (2.83 sq mi)
- Elevation: 228 m (748 ft)
- Highest elevation: 237 m (778 ft)
- Lowest elevation: 117 m (384 ft)
- Population (2023): 76
  - Density: 10/km^{2} (27/sq mi)
- Time zone: UTC+01:00 (CET)
  - Summer (DST): UTC+02:00 (CEST)
- INSEE/Postal code: 40148 /40320
- ^{1} French Land Register data, which excludes lakes, ponds, glaciers > 1 km^{2} (0.386 sq mi or 247 acres) and river estuaries.

Lauret (French pronunciation: [loʁɛ]) is a commune in the Landes department in Nouvelle-Aquitaine in south-western France.

== See also ==
- Communes of the Landes department
