= Fargues, Landes =

Fargues
- Commune
- Location of Fargues
- Location within France Location within Nouvelle-Aquitaine
- Coordinates: 43°43′49″N 0°26′56″W
- Country: France
- Region: Nouvelle-Aquitaine
- Department: Landes
- Arrondissement: Mont-de-Marsan
- Canton: Chalosse Tursan

Government
  - Mayor (2020–2026): Philippe Pineau
- Area^{1}: 11.84 km^{2} (4.57 sq mi)
- Elevation: 160 m (520 ft)
- Highest elevation: 130 m (430 ft)
- Lowest elevation: 57 m (187 ft)
- Population (2023): 314
  - Density: 26.5/km^{2} (68.7/sq mi)
- Time zone: UTC+01:00 (CET)
  - Summer (DST): UTC+02:00 (CEST)
- INSEE/Postal code: 40099 /40500
- ^{1} French Land Register data, which excludes lakes, ponds, glaciers > 1 km^{2} (0.386 sq mi or 247 acres) and river estuaries.

Fargues (French pronunciation: [faʁɡ]; Gascon: Fargas) is a commune in the Landes department in Nouvelle-Aquitaine in southwestern France.

== Population ==
Historical population
Year	Pop.	±% p.a.
1968	293	—
1975	277	−0.80%
1982	279	+0.10%
1990	282	+0.13%
1999	264	−0.73%
2007	307	+1.90%
2012	324	+1.08%
2017	330	+0.37%
2023	314	−0.82%
Source: INSEE

== See also ==
- Communes of the Landes department
