= Philondenx =

- Commune
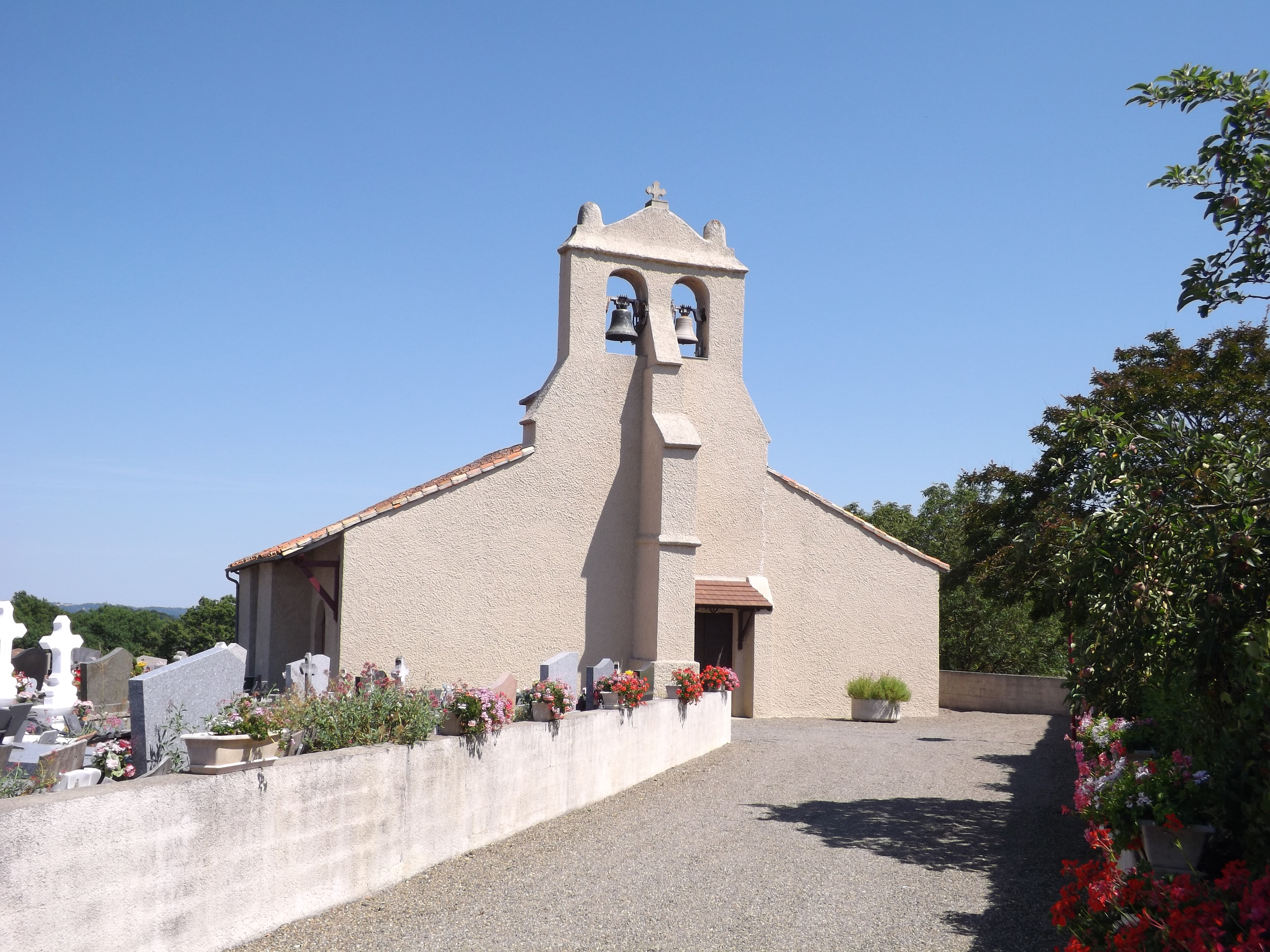
- Location of Philondenx
- Location within France Location within Nouvelle-Aquitaine
- Coordinates: 43°33′48″N 0°26′42″W
- Country: France
- Region: Nouvelle-Aquitaine
- Department: Landes
- Arrondissement: Mont-de-Marsan
- Canton: Chalosse Tursan

Government
  - Mayor (2020–2026): Céline Labat
- Area^{1}: 9.66 km^{2} (3.73 sq mi)
- Elevation: 218 m (715 ft)
- Highest elevation: 227 m (745 ft)
- Lowest elevation: 101 m (331 ft)
- Population (2023): 187
  - Density: 19.4/km^{2} (50.1/sq mi)
- Time zone: UTC+01:00 (CET)
  - Summer (DST): UTC+02:00 (CEST)
- INSEE/Postal code: 40225 /40320
- ^{1} French Land Register data, which excludes lakes, ponds, glaciers > 1 km^{2} (0.386 sq mi or 247 acres) and river estuaries.

Philondenx (Gascon: Hilhondé) is a commune in the Landes department in Nouvelle-Aquitaine in southwestern France.

== Population ==
Historical population
Year	Pop.	±% p.a.
1968	286	—
1975	275	−0.56%
1982	266	−0.47%
1990	221	−2.29%
1999	204	−0.89%
2007	207	+0.18%
2012	213	+0.57%
2017	202	−1.05%
2023	187	−1.28%
Source: INSEE

== See also ==
- Communes of the Landes department
