= Labastide-Chalosse =

- Commune
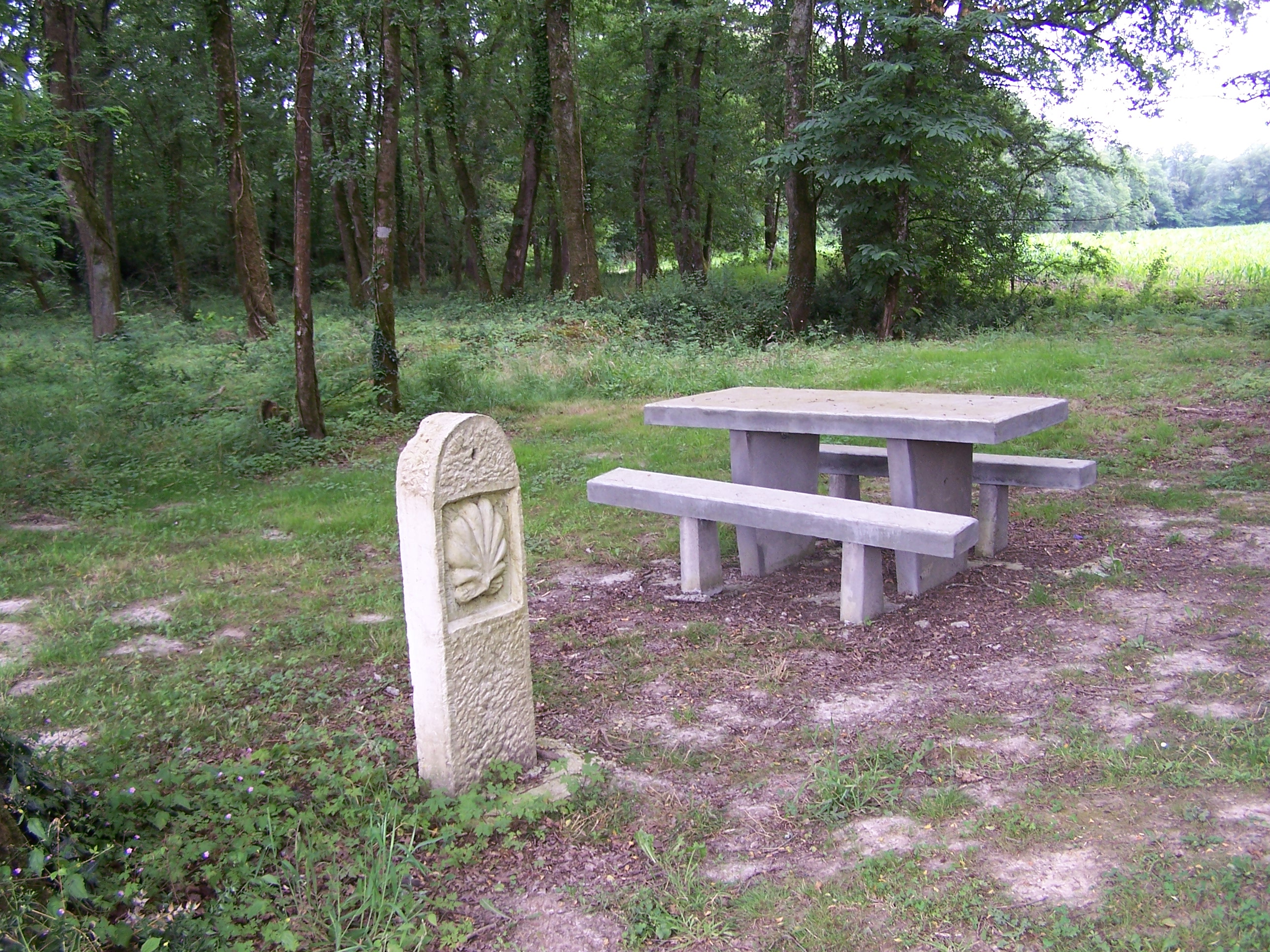
- Boundary stone with St James shell in Labastide-Chalosse
- Location of Labastide-Chalosse
- Location within France Location within Nouvelle-Aquitaine
- Coordinates: 43°36′47″N 0°36′32″W
- Country: France
- Region: Nouvelle-Aquitaine
- Department: Landes
- Arrondissement: Mont-de-Marsan
- Canton: Chalosse Tursan
- Intercommunality: Chalosse Tursan

Government
  - Mayor (2020–2026): Roland Brisé
- Area^{1}: 4.56 km^{2} (1.76 sq mi)
- Highest elevation: 127 m (417 ft)
- Lowest elevation: 49 m (161 ft)
- Population (2023): 172
  - Density: 37.7/km^{2} (97.7/sq mi)
- Time zone: UTC+01:00 (CET)
  - Summer (DST): UTC+02:00 (CEST)
- INSEE/Postal code: 40130 /40700
- ^{1} French Land Register data, which excludes lakes, ponds, glaciers > 1 km^{2} (0.386 sq mi or 247 acres) and river estuaries.

Labastide-Chalosse (French pronunciation: [labastid ʃalɔs]; Occitan: La Bastida de Shalòssa) is a commune in the Landes department in Nouvelle-Aquitaine in south-western France.

== See also ==
- Communes of the Landes department
