= Bats, Landes =

Bats
- Commune
- Location of Bats
- Location within France Location within Nouvelle-Aquitaine
- Coordinates: 43°39′35″N 0°27′27″W
- Country: France
- Region: Nouvelle-Aquitaine
- Department: Landes
- Arrondissement: Mont-de-Marsan
- Canton: Chalosse Tursan

Government
  - Mayor (2020–2026): Jean-Marc Dupouy
- Area^{1}: 7.35 km^{2} (2.84 sq mi)
- Elevation: 105 m (344 ft)
- Highest elevation: 148 m (486 ft)
- Lowest elevation: 69 m (226 ft)
- Population (2023): 328
  - Density: 44.6/km^{2} (116/sq mi)
- Time zone: UTC+01:00 (CET)
  - Summer (DST): UTC+02:00 (CEST)
- INSEE/Postal code: 40029 /40320
- ^{1} French Land Register data, which excludes lakes, ponds, glaciers > 1 km^{2} (0.386 sq mi or 247 acres) and river estuaries.

Bats (Gascon: Vaths) is a commune in the Landes department in Nouvelle-Aquitaine in southwestern France.

== Population ==
Historical population
Year	Pop.	±% p.a.
1968	239	—
1975	244	+0.30%
1982	232	−0.72%
1990	238	+0.32%
1999	230	−0.38%
2007	264	+1.74%
2012	308	+3.13%
2017	304	−0.26%
2023	328	+1.27%
Source: INSEE

== See also ==
- Communes of the Landes department
