= Dumes =

- Commune
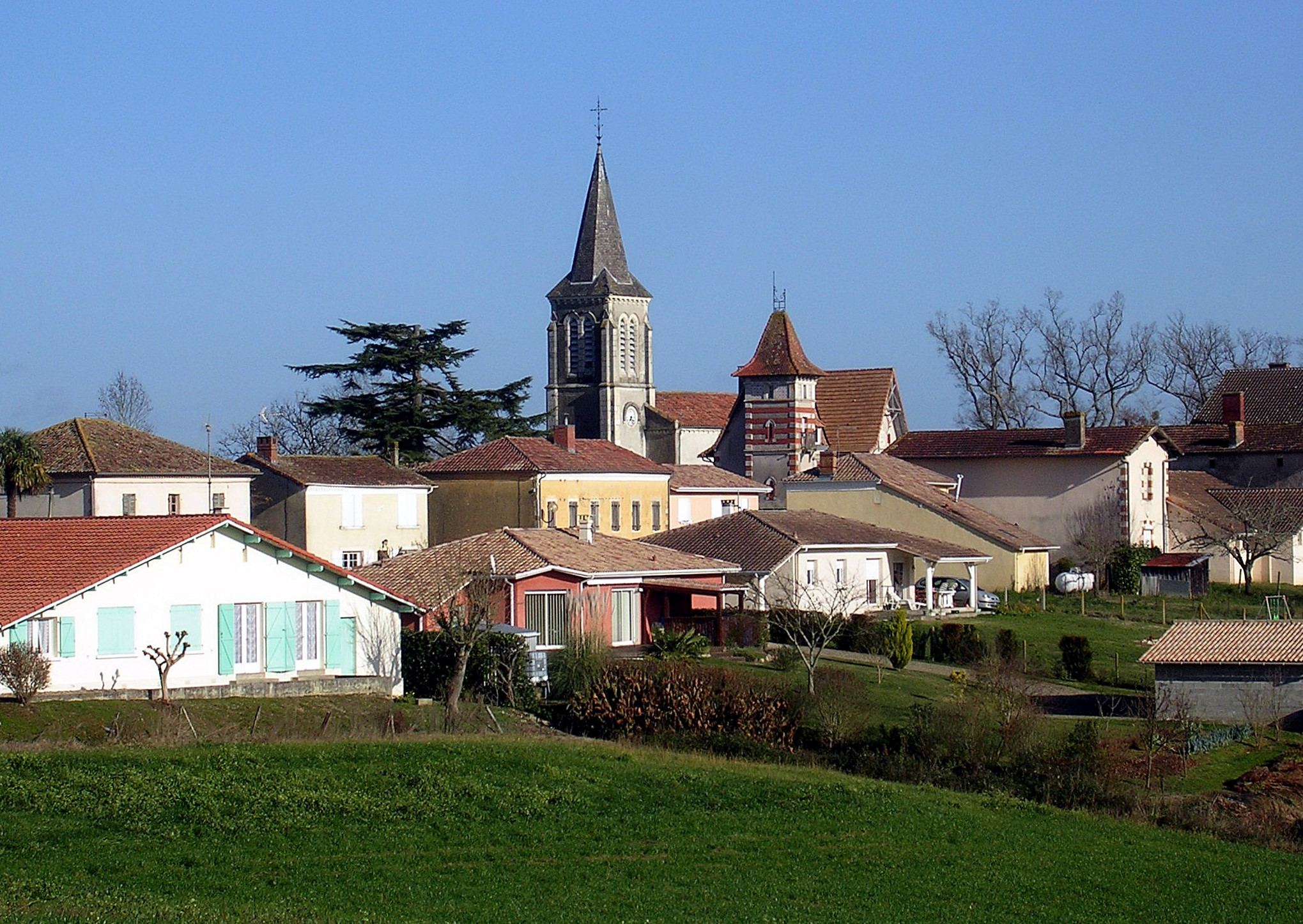
- Location of Dumes
- Location within France Location within Nouvelle-Aquitaine
- Coordinates: 43°42′25″N 0°34′52″W
- Country: France
- Region: Nouvelle-Aquitaine
- Department: Landes
- Arrondissement: Mont-de-Marsan
- Canton: Chalosse Tursan
- Intercommunality: Chalosse Tursan

Government
  - Mayor (2020–2026): Franck Bedin
- Area^{1}: 2.48 km^{2} (0.96 sq mi)
- Elevation: 103 m (338 ft)
- Highest elevation: 113 m (371 ft)
- Lowest elevation: 51 m (167 ft)
- Population (2023): 265
  - Density: 107/km^{2} (277/sq mi)
- Time zone: UTC+01:00 (CET)
  - Summer (DST): UTC+02:00 (CEST)
- INSEE/Postal code: 40092 /40500
- ^{1} French Land Register data, which excludes lakes, ponds, glaciers > 1 km^{2} (0.386 sq mi or 247 acres) and river estuaries.

Dumes (French pronunciation: [dym]; Occitan: Dume) is a commune in the Landes department in Nouvelle-Aquitaine in southwestern France.

== Population ==
Historical population
Year	Pop.	±% p.a.
1968	152	—
1975	136	−1.58%
1982	112	−2.74%
1990	113	+0.11%
1999	133	+1.83%
2007	255	+8.48%
2012	269	+1.07%
2017	236	−2.58%
2023	265	+1.95%
Source: INSEE

== See also ==
- Communes of the Landes department
