= Aurice =

- Commune
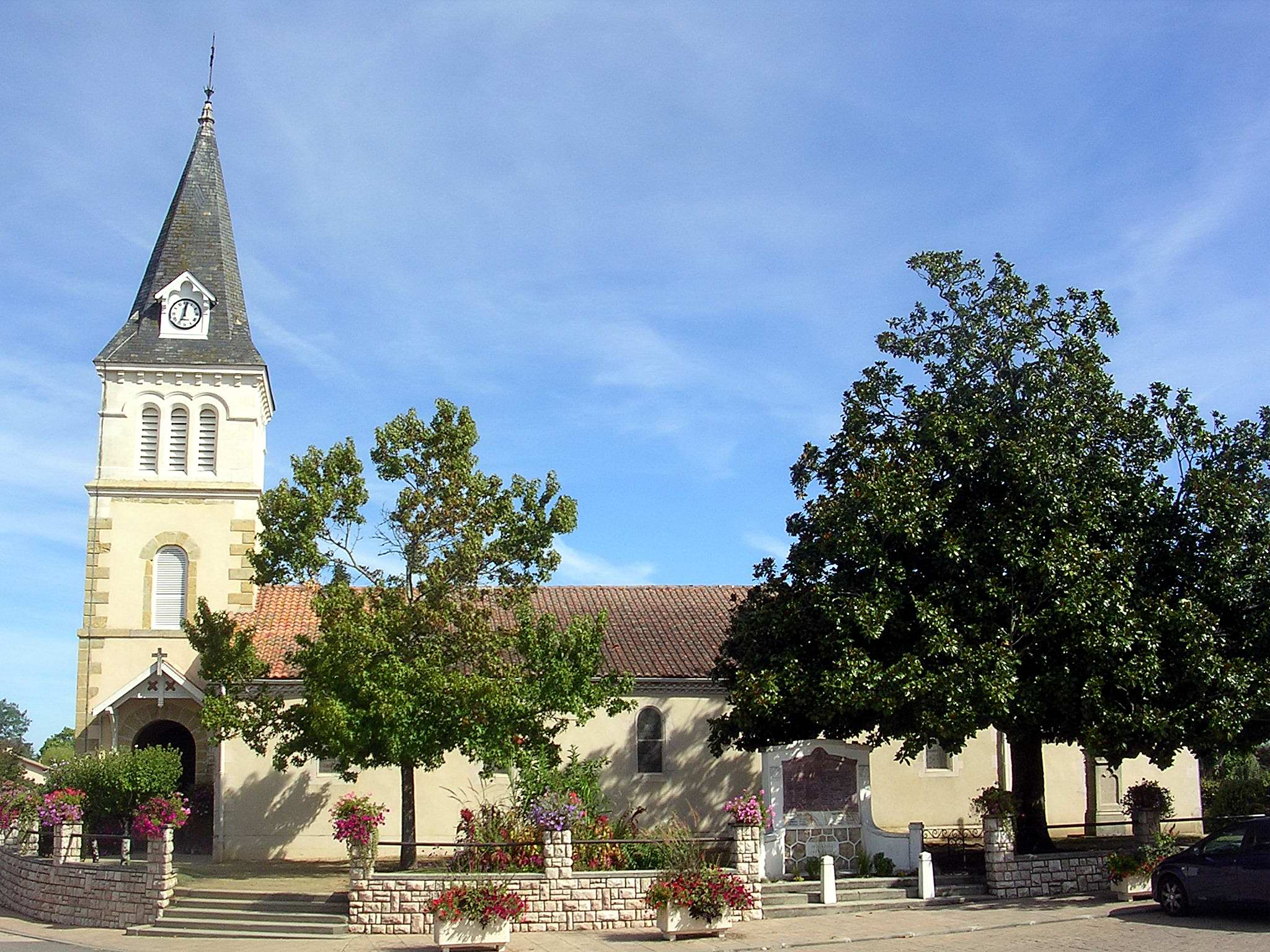
- The church of Aurice

- Coat of arms
- Location of Aurice
- Location within France Location within Nouvelle-Aquitaine
- Coordinates: 43°48′54″N 0°36′13″W
- Country: France
- Region: Nouvelle-Aquitaine
- Department: Landes
- Arrondissement: Mont-de-Marsan
- Canton: Chalosse Tursan
- Intercommunality: CC Chalosse Tursan

Government
  - Mayor (2020–2026): Frédéric Lafitte
- Area^{1}: 17.31 km^{2} (6.68 sq mi)
- Elevation: 74 m (243 ft)
- Highest elevation: 83 m (272 ft)
- Lowest elevation: 26 m (85 ft)
- Population (2023): 633
  - Density: 36.6/km^{2} (94.7/sq mi)
- Time zone: UTC+01:00 (CET)
  - Summer (DST): UTC+02:00 (CEST)
- INSEE/Postal code: 40020 /40500
- ^{1} French Land Register data, which excludes lakes, ponds, glaciers > 1 km^{2} (0.386 sq mi or 247 acres) and river estuaries.

Aurice (French pronunciation: [oʁis]; Occitan: Autor) is a commune in the Landes department in Nouvelle-Aquitaine in southwestern France.

== Population ==
Historical population
Year	Pop.	±% p.a.
1968	541	—
1975	543	+0.05%
1982	549	+0.16%
1990	610	+1.33%
1999	627	+0.31%
2007	649	+0.43%
2012	634	−0.47%
2017	609	−0.80%
2023	633	+0.65%
Source: INSEE

== See also ==
- Communes of the Landes department
