= Tursan =

French wine

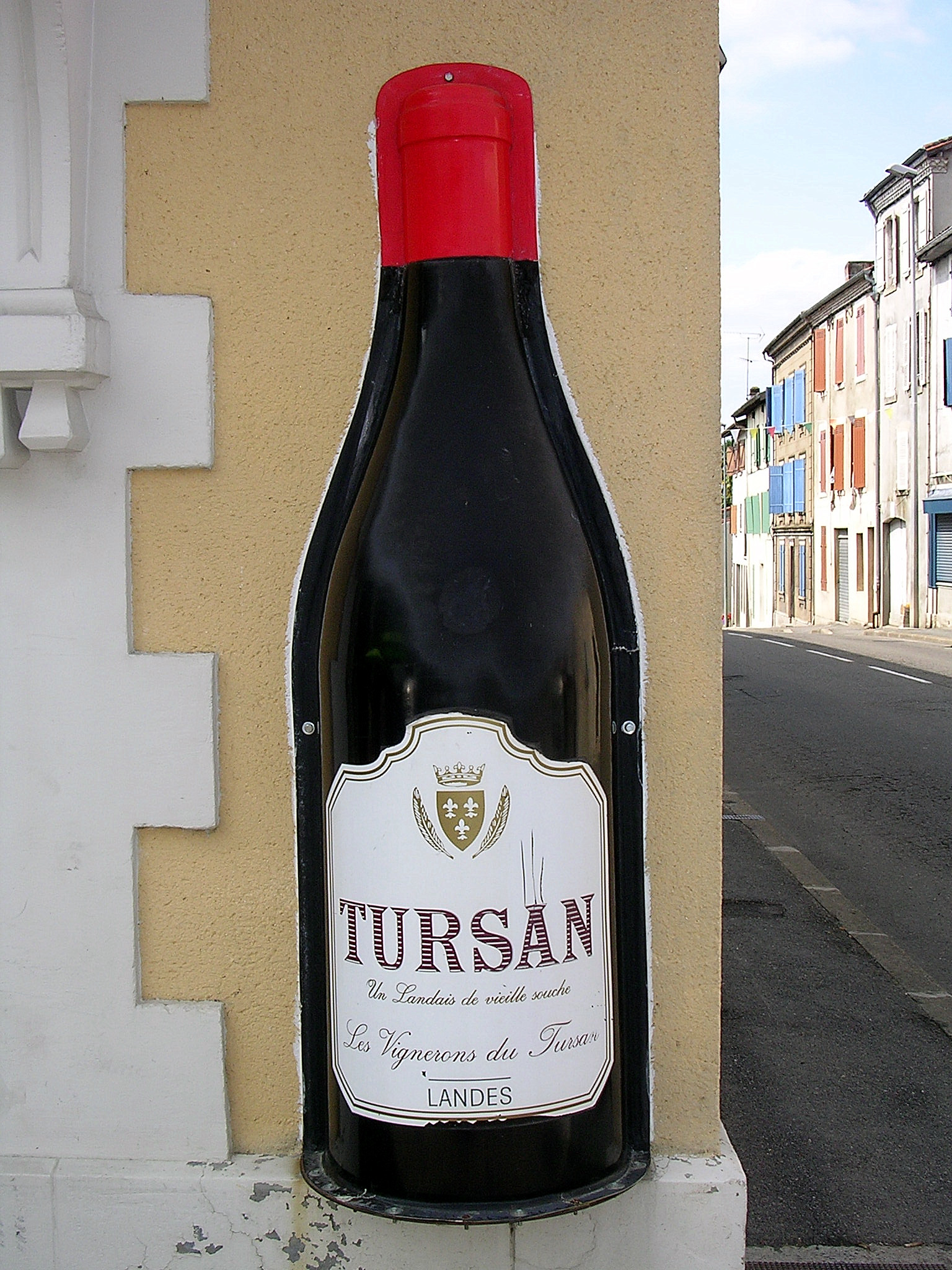
A bottle of red Tursan wine.

Tursan (French pronunciation: [tyʁsɑ̃]), first a Vin délimité de qualité supérieure (VDQS) for wine in South West France since 1958 (decree of 11 July 1958, last modified 26 February 2003), has been granted AOC status in 2011.

== Presentation ==
Its production zone covers potentially 4,000 hectares (although less than 500 hectares of it is covered by vineyards). It lies 35 km south-east of Mont-de-Marsan and covers 39 communes of the département Landes, 2 communes of Gers, and the area of Adour, between the Landes and Béarn.

It can be produced as white, rosé or red wine.

- Red Tursan is produced with Tannat (40% maximum), Cabernet franc and Cabernet sauvignon.
- White Tursan is composed of Baroque (30 to 90%), de Gros manseng and Sauvignon blanc (roughly 10%).
- Rosé Tursan is based on Cabernet franc and Cabernet sauvignon.

== Production area ==
In Landes:

- Aire-sur-l'Adour, Bahus-Soubiran, Buanes, Classun, Duhort-Bachen, Eugénie-les-Bains, Latrille, Renung, Saint-Agnet, Saint-Loubouer, Sarron and Vielle-Tursan.
- Arboucave, Bats, Castelnau-Tursan, Clèdes, Geaune, Lauret, Lacajunte, Mauries, Miramont-Sensacq, Pimbo, Pécorade, Payros-Cazautets, Philondenx, Puyol-Cazalet, Samadet, Sorbets and Urgons.
- Cazères-sur-l'Adour, Larrivière.
- Aubagnan, Serres-Gaston.
- Coudures, Eyres-Moncube (the east part of the Gabas valley), Fargues, Montgaillard, Montsoué, Sarraziet.

In Gers:

- Lannux and Ségos.

== See also ==
- French wine
