= Siege of Tartas =

15th-century battle during the Hundred Years' War

- Part of the Hundred Years' War (1415–53 phase)
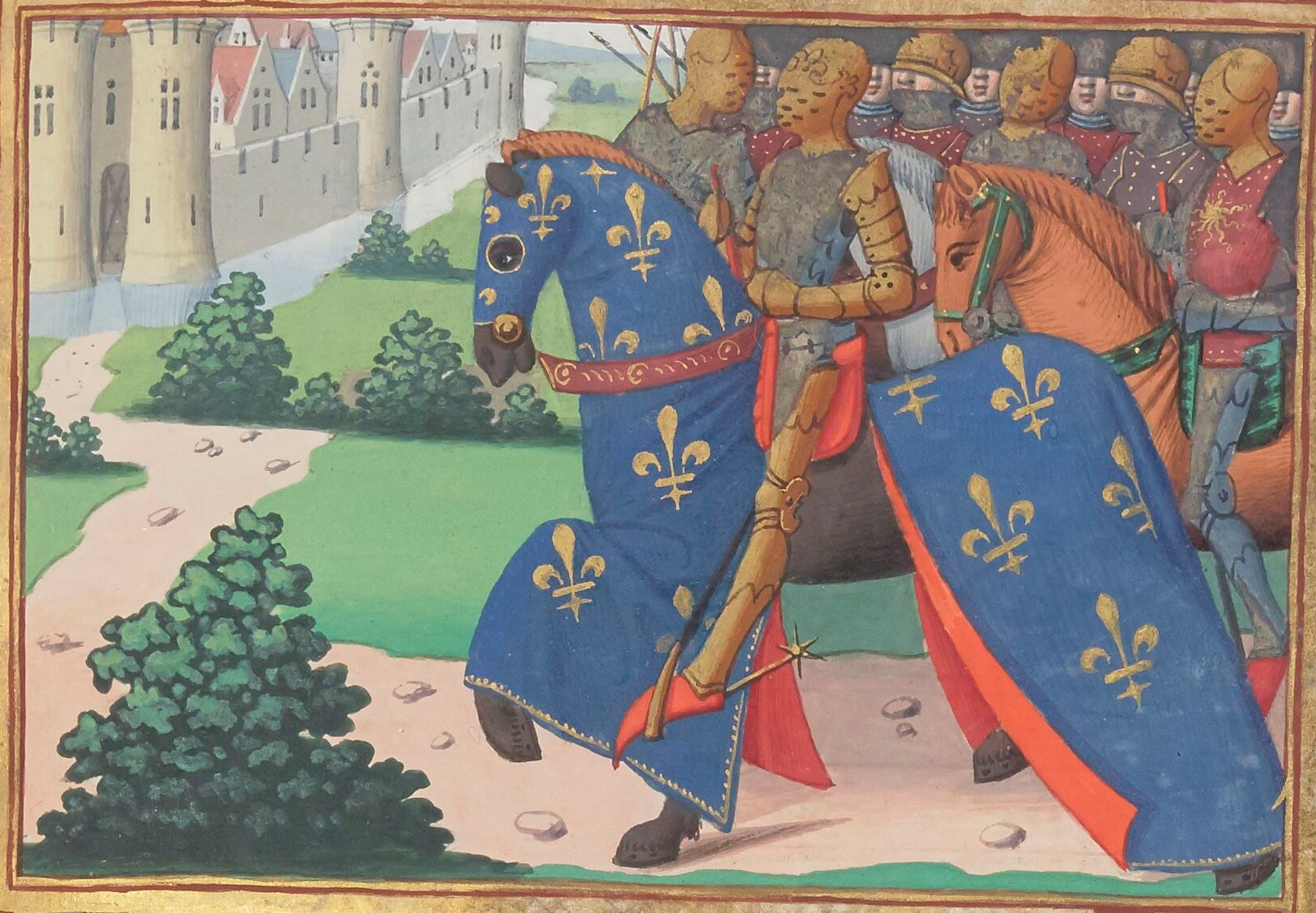
- King Charles VII of France entering Tartas on 24 June 1442. Miniature from the Vigiles du roi Charles VII by Martial d'Auvergne, c. 1484
Date	31 August 1440 – 24 June 1442
Location	Tartas, Gascony 43.8336°N 0.8075°W
Result	French victory

Belligerents
Kingdom of England • Gascony	Barony of Albret; Kingdom of France

Commanders and leaders
John Holland; Thomas Rempston	Charles II of Albret; John, Vc. of Lomagne

Strength
500	Garrison unknown 12,000 (relief)

Casualties and losses
Unknown	Unknown

The siege of Tartas (31 August 1440 – 24 June 1442) in Gascony was an engagement between English and French forces in the late stages of the Hundred Years' War. It was undertaken by English forces and their Gascon subjects against Charles II of Albret, a powerful nobleman in southwestern France. Albret was hostile to the English and his presence in Gascony caused much trouble to the English in the region, thereby raising the need to strike against him. The bulk of hostilities only lasted up until early 1441: the siege had dragged on inconclusively, and peace terms were agreed between the attackers and defenders. The ceasefire was extended several times until mid-1442 as both sides awaited further support from England and France.

The conduct of this affair became an important subject as one of the arrangements concluded in 1441 stated that Albret had to switch his allegiance if his suzerain, Charles VII of France, failed to aid him against his enemies. This had in fact raised the possibility of the entire nobility of southwestern France switching their allegiance to the English. Nothing came of it, however. Undermanned and outnumbered, the English withdrew in face of an approaching French army on 24 June 1442.

== Context ==
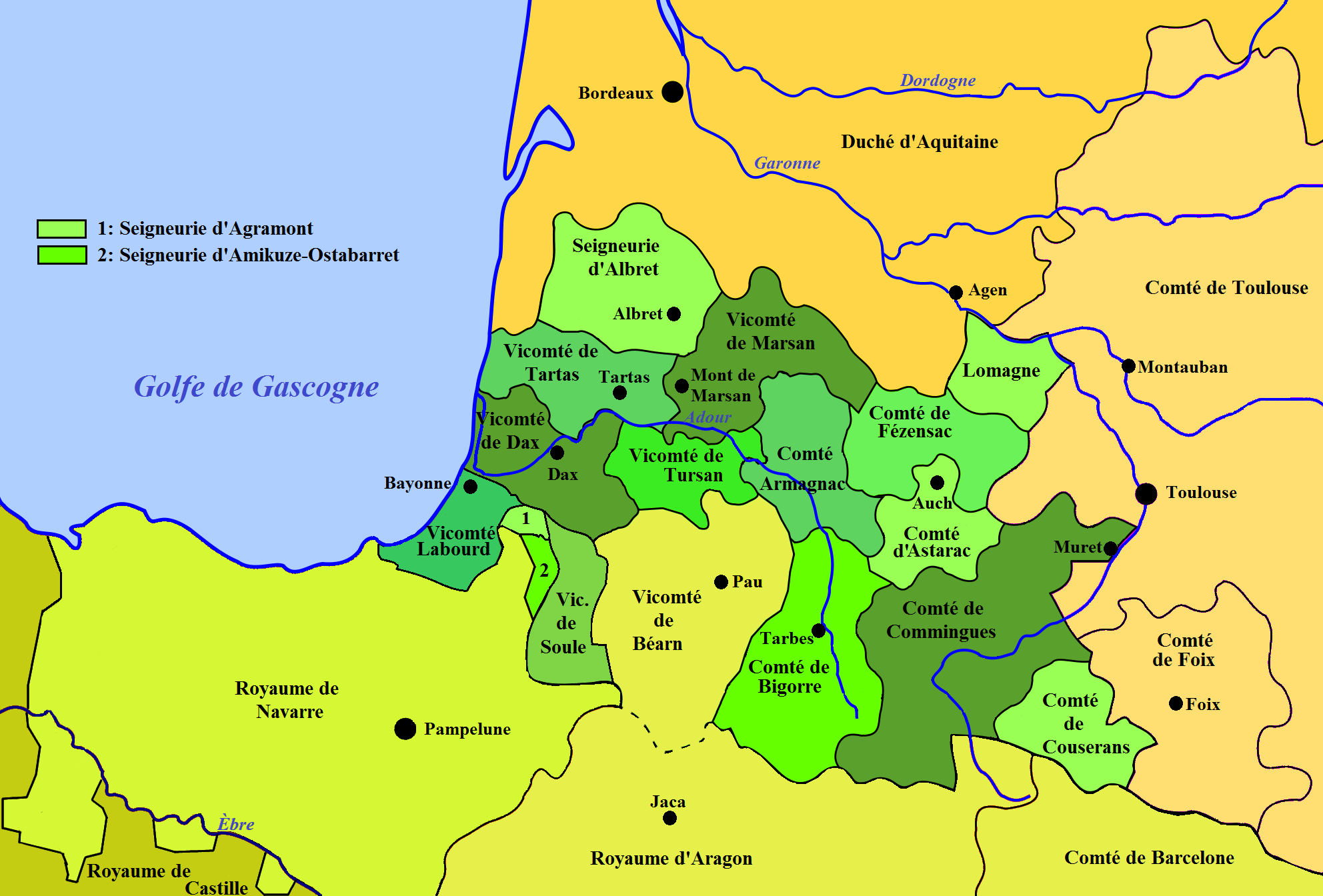
Gascon fiefs in the Middle Ages

The stronghold of Tartas was located halfway between the towns of Dax and Mont-de-Marsan, in what would later become the Landes department, all in the region of Gascony in southwestern France. The town is crossed by the Midouze, a tributary of the Adour. Tartas was the capital of the namesake viscounty of Tartas, which in turn was held, since 1338, in personal union with the bordering lordship of Albret, owned by the House of Albret, one of the most powerful and influential noble families in the region.

The House of Albret had been attached to the English cause in the 14th century, as vassal in Aquitaine under Edward, the Black Prince, but switched sides in the late 1360s and was aligned to the House of Valois ever since. The Lord of Albret at the time of the siege of Tartas was Charles II. His presence was a thorn to the English in Gascony as he constantly raided their territories in the region. A neutralization of Albret by the English would strengthen their positions in Gascony and protect their territories from French raids and attacks.

Repeated French threats in Gascony did not go unnoticed by the government in England. In 1439, the English sent to the region an army of 2,300 men (2,000 archers and 300 men-at-arms) under the command of John Holland, Earl of Huntingdon, appointed lieutenant of Aquitaine on 27 March. Holland landed with his force at Bordeaux on 2 August 1439, and was shortly afterwards joined by sir Thomas Rempston (the English seneschal of Guyenne) and by other important English-attached figures in the region. Anticipating an Anglo-Gascon onslaught, in October 1439 the French Estates of Languedoc in southern France assembled at Castres and raised a subsidy to defend Guyenne and Gascony against Holland's army. Charles VII, the King of France, financed the potential expenses the Lord of Albret might have in order to defend his lands from the English. The manpower and nobility of southwestern France were mobilized in preparation for a possible upcoming confrontation.

== Development of the siege (1440) ==
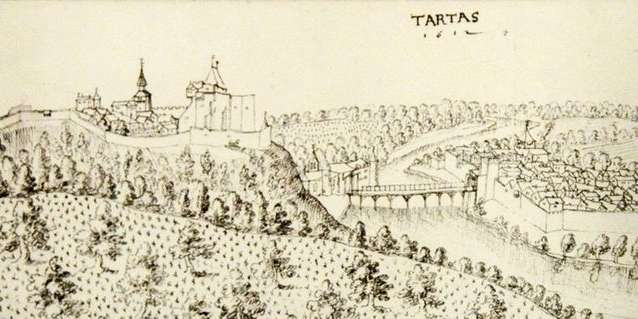
Illustration of the fortified town of Tartas (1612). The fortifications and hilly landscape present a difficulty for attackers.

In order to initiate a campaign in the region, the English tried to secure support and funding from their Gascon subjects. Two of the three Gascon Estates of Lannes, the provincial assembly of English Gascony, agreed to fund an English army for a 6-month siege of the town of Tartas. They also requested Huntingdon that Thomas Rempston should lead the besieging force, due to the large size of the defending garrison.

Rempston positioned his army, numbering about 100 men-at-arms, 400 archers, and several artillery pieces, around the town's walls on 31 August. As the siege progressed, it was noted that Tartas was well defended and well supplied, and the English would likely not be able to take it before the stipulated 6 months. Charles II of Albret and his nephew John, Viscount of Lomagne (eldest son and heir of John IV, Count of Armagnac, another powerful nobleman in the region), attempted to raise the siege by ravaging nearby English lands, in particular the Chalosse and the lands of the Lord of Lescun (Rempston's lieutenant), which in turn included Coudures, Audignon, Sainte-Colombe, and Eyres. This did not deter the English from their objective, however, and the siege dragged on.

In late 1440, the Earl of Huntingdon was recalled to England, where he arrived on 21 December. The exact cause for this is not known, but apparently his indentures were not being fulfilled by the English government. This left Thomas Rempston as the main English commander in the region, but otherwise the English affairs in Gascony were left without a unified command.

After more than 4 months, the city was damaged, and the citizens inside were suffering with hunger and poverty. Albret's men were exhausted after a long resistance and after fruitless raids, while the besiegers weren't making enough progress. Eventually, both sides agreed to initiate peace talks. Albret sent his nephew, the viscount of Lomagne, and his ambassadors (which included a nephew of La Hire), to meet with the English delegation to discuss terms of conditional surrender. They met at Saint-Sever with representatives of the Gascon Estates of Lannes, and managed to reach an agreement. Albret, located at Coudures, endorsed the agreed provisions on 3 January 1441, followed by Rempston on the following day, and both of them formalized the agreement by signing a treaty on 20 January.

== Peace agreement (1441) ==
Both parties agreed to a 3-month truce, an exchange of hostages, and the establishment of a provisional government over the town. As a guarantee to enforce the terms, the Lord of Albret handed Tartas over to Charles, his underage son, who would be placed under the tutelage of several prominent Gascon figures who were attached to the English. The town would, in effect, be placed under joint control by Albret and the English. The inhabitants were to be allowed to freely maintain their relations with the rest of Gascony as they wished. The most important point agreed, however, was one that stipulated that a trial of strength would be held at Tartas between the French and the English on the day the truce ended, and that the strongest side left standing would be awarded control of the town. Furthermore, if the English emerged victorious, Albret's lands would be handed to his son Charles, who in turn would pledge allegiance to the English. Should he refuse, the Albret family lands would be forfeited and absorbed into the royal domain of the Lancastrian crown.

Albret had essentially agreed that if his overlord, Charles VII of France, failed to come to his aid, he would switch his allegiance, thus placing all of his lands under the suzerainty of the English. He promptly requested help from Charles VII. Though it could be thought that a small Gascon town would not have concerned the king much in normal circumstances, the consequences of a potential defection from one of his most powerful vassals in Gascony would be disastrous for the Valois regime in southwestern France. Charles VII would see large amounts of land in the region immediately and suddenly pass over to English control, more so since Albret's noble neighbours in the Midi-Pyrénées perhaps would also feel compelled to follow suit, for fear of having their lands invaded by the English. Gascony would be placed firmly under enemy hands. With the support of the southwestern French nobility, the English would be able to focus their energies more in defending northern France, strengthening their hold on the entirety of their French territories.

The capitulation created a challenge to Charles VII. The King of France, whose disputed legitimacy to such title was the cause of the whole war itself, was expected to protect his vassals in times of adversity, and failure to do so would justify Albret and other vassals recognizing as king another (in this case the King of England) who could do a better job of offering protection. This was especially true since Albret's family had been strong supporters of the House of Valois: Albret's father Charles I had died while commanding the French armies at the Battle of Agincourt, while Charles II had fought with Joan of Arc and held Charles VII's sword during the latter's coronation in 1429. A lack of action from Charles VII would constitute an insult to Albret, and would undermine the trust and confidence of the French king's other vassals.

It was thus imperative for both claimants to the French throne to show up and demonstrate their power in this stipulated show of force. Southwestern France was home to several influential nobles, such as the Counts of Armagnac, Foix, and Comminges, whose support would determine the balance of power in the region. Their allegiance was vital to the continued war effort of either side.

== Intrigues in France and England (1441–1442) ==
The situation didn't seem too promising for the English, however. The confrontation had been scheduled to 1 May 1441, the day the 3-month truce would expire, but the English in Gascony were lacking men and resources, which forced the local English captains to postpone the show of force several times. Ever since the Earl of Huntingdon was recalled to England in late 1440, English affairs in Gascony were left without an ultimate direction, and the English crown was finding it increasingly difficult to worry about its Gascon territories, as the focus was on defending northern France from attacks by Charles VII. Though the Gascon Estates sent emissaries to England in February 1441 to update King Henry VI on the situation and to request aid, little to no help was forthcoming for the time being. The show of force was eventually stipulated to happen on St. John's Day (24 June) of 1442. This agreement paralyzed Gascony for 18 months.

The English king's uncle and heir presumptive Humphrey, Duke of Gloucester, criticized the English crown's neglect for Gascony and its failure to properly support the Earl of Huntingdon in the region. He warned that English positions in Gascony would be vulnerable to an attack by forces of the houses of Albret, Foix, and Armagnac, the most powerful families in southwestern France, all of whom were nominally loyal to the House of Valois. Gloucester advocated for an active policy of intervention to protect English territories. His influence was limited however, as Henry VI was increasingly favourable to his uncle's rival, Cardinal Henry Beaufort, and his policy of reconciliation, over Humphrey's irredentism.

Charles VII of France also faced his own problems. He led a difficult campaign against the English in the Île-de-France in 1441, and in early 1442, he had a meeting at Nevers with his some of his leading nobles, who made various requests not too dissimilar to those which formed the pretext of the Praguerie revolt two years earlier. Among these nobles were the Dukes of Orléans and Burgundy, whose families had previously been mortal enemies in the Armagnac–Burgundian Civil War several decades earlier, but were now close political allies. Furthermore, Count John IV of Armagnac (one of Charles VII's more rebellious nobles) had been negotiating his daughter's marriage to the king of England himself, which would have strengthened the English position in Gascony, and helped to sway other French nobles to the English side.

While Gascony stood on the sidelines, the English captain Thomas Rempston, at this point the main English figure in southwestern France, hoped to exploit the diplomatic advantage and took the time to try to extend the truce to the entirety of Guyenne. He engaged in negotiations with other nearby hostile French nobles. On 8 August 1441 he concluded a truce with the viscounts of Limoges and Turenne (nephew of Pope Gregory XI), who held lands not far from Bordeaux.

At the Nevers meeting of 1442, the Duke of Orléans tried advocating for peace between France and England, not forgetting the promise he made to the English after his release in 1440. Charles VII however was determined to lift the siege of Tartas at once without delay. Charles ignored the demands of his vassals and skillfully dismissed them, and prepared a large expedition to Gascony, the so-called "Journée de Tartas".

== Journée de Tartas ==
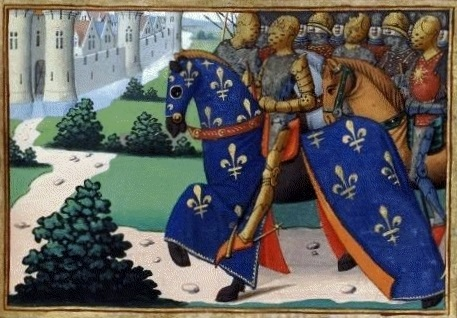
24 June 1442: Journée de Tartas. French forces arrive in the town. (illustration from Vigiles de Charles VII, 15th century)

Charles VII assembled a large army, essentially provided by smaller nobility, as his leading vassals and princes of blood, the dukes of Orléans, Burgundy, Alençon, and Bourbon, who were all at odds with their overlord, did not bother contributing to the force. At the same time, the Count of Armagnac was in the process of negotiating a marriage alliance with the English. The French army was commanded by Charles VII and by the constable of France, Arthur de Richemont. Jean Bureau was in charge of the artillery, and the Counts of Maine and Eu served as marshals.

The force departed in May 1442 from the region of Limousin, arrived at Figeac on 2 June, and finally at Toulouse on 8 June. They left Toulouse on 11 June, after which the army was temporarily split due to logistical problems, with Richemont assuming command of the left wing and Charles VII of the right wing. Richemont's forces went through Riscle and Grenade, bypassed Saint-Sever which was occupied by the English, and avoided crossing the Adour river. Charles VII's troops passed through Auch, Vic, Nogaro, and Le Houga. The French army further split into several companies who went through different roads, with several towns refusing them obedience, the companies themselves being unable to stop the march and retaliate. The army's parts joined again at Mont-de-Marsan, where Charles VII arrived on 21 June. The French captain La Hire arrived the following day, after, according to legend, having fought a group of English routiers and assaulted a castle close to Ygos. On 23 June, Charles VII stayed in the fortified town of Meilhan (which belonged to the Count of Foix), and in the following day he went to Tartas along the Midouze river.

On 24 June, the French showed up at Tartas with about 12,000 men. As no English force showed up, the French troops didn't bother assuming a full battle formation. Only a skirmish was reported east of the city, but otherwise no significant confrontation happened, and the English and their Gascon allies didn't try to resist. Arthur de Richemont was received by the Lord of Cauna and by Augerot de Saint-Per, both of whom were important figures in the region and who were attached to the English cause. Accompanied by their hostage, the young Charles d'Albret, they handed the keys of the town to Richemont. Perhaps fearful of losing his lands, the Lord of Cauna afterwards paid homage to Charles VII, but Saint-Per remained faithful to the English party and took refuge in nearby Dax. The whole episode at Tartas thus rendered no benefit for the English, and the French emerged victorious.

== Aftermath ==
French expedition of 1442 to Gascony
- Part of the Hundred Years' War (1415–53 phase)
Date	May – December 1442
Location	Southwestern France
Result	French victory

Belligerents
Kingdom of France	Kingdom of England

Commanders and leaders
Charles VII of France; Arthur de Richemont	Thomas Rempston (POW)

The French continued campaigning in Gascony. They succeeded in taking tows such as Dax, Condom, Marmande, and Saint-Sever, but failed to take the two most important cities, Bordeaux and Bayonne. Saint-Sever switched hands multiple times, but eventually fell to the French, and Thomas Rempston, the English seneschal, was captured there. After taking La Réole on 8 December (where Charles VII was almost burnt within a house which was set on fire), the French withdrew to Montauban on 23 December to spend the winter, marking the end of the campaign. The captain La Hire died there on 11 January 1443.

In all of this, English Gascony had been left to fend for itself, as still no support came from home. Henry VI received a letter from his secretary Thomas Beckington, dated on 18 October 1442, which informed the king about the enemy's progress in Guyenne and the capture of La Réole. It also complained about the lack of support from the English crown in the situation, stating that a few reinforcements would have stopped the French advance and even resulted in the possible capture of Charles VII himself. It is not totally clear whether the English crown couldn't send men or if the lack of action was the result of neglect from Henry VI's ministers. Dax eventually fell back to the English with the help of pro-English elements in the region. But otherwise this show of strength by the French went to show the decline of English power and influence in France.

On 11 May 1443, the Gascon Estates of Lannes, previously loyal to the English, were incorporated into the realm of Charles VII. A seneschal of Lannes had been appointed by the French king on 9 January. At the same time, a marriage was concluded between Arthur de Richemont and Jeanne d'Albret, daughter of Charles II of Albret.
