= Gabas (river) =

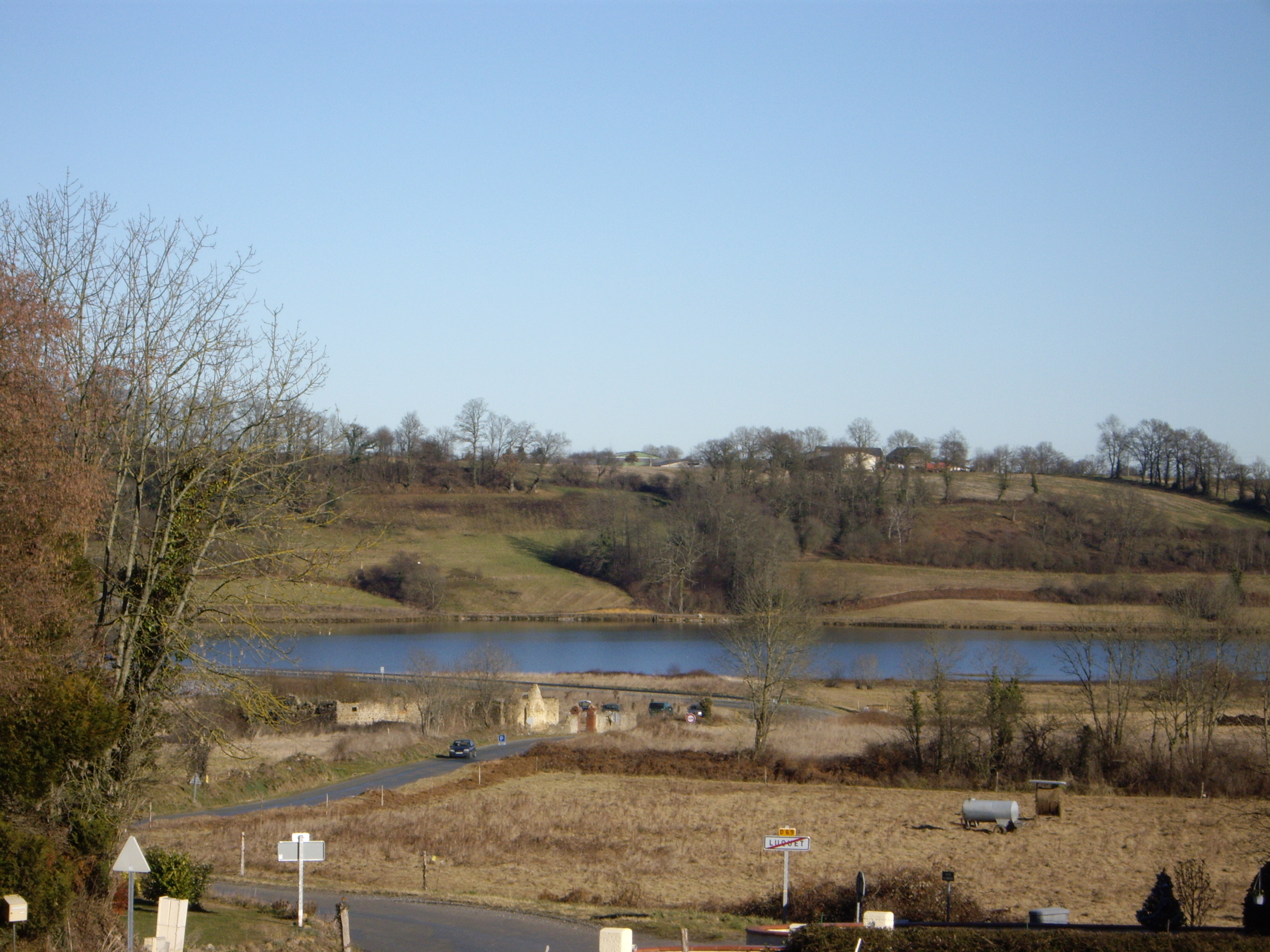

- Location within France Location within Nouvelle-Aquitaine

Location
- Country: France

Physical characteristics
- Source
  - location: Plateau of Ger
- Mouth
  - location: Adour
  - coordinates: 43°45′41″N 0°42′9″W
- Length: 117 km (73 mi)

Basin features
- Progression: Adour→ Atlantic Ocean

The Gabas (French pronunciation: [ɡabas]; Occitan: Gabàs) is a left tributary of the Adour, in the Landes, in the Southwest of France. It is 116.7 km (72.5 mi) long.

== Name ==
The name Gabas is derived from the French gave (Gascon: 'gabe'), which in the Pyrenees generically describes a small or large watercourse. The river was known as the fluvius gavasensis in 982.

A tributary of the Léez is named the Gabassot, a hypocoristic of Gabas.

== Geography ==
The Gabas rises in the plateau of Ger in the north of Lourdes, as the union of the Gabastou and the Honrède. It flows north-west like the neighboring rivers: the Luy, the Uzan and the Ousse.

The Gabas crosses the Tursan, in the Landes. It flows into the Adour in Toulouzette, downstream from Saint-Sever.

A dam of 20 million cubic metres (16,000 acre⋅ft) was built in its upper course to regulate the lowest water level.

== Main tributaries ==
- (R) the Bayle from Lourenties
- (R) the Bas, from Geaune
  - (R) the Lescoû, from Saint-Loubouer
  - (L) the Petit Bas, from Pimbo
- (L) the Laudon, from Hagetmau
