= Saint-Sever =

- Commune
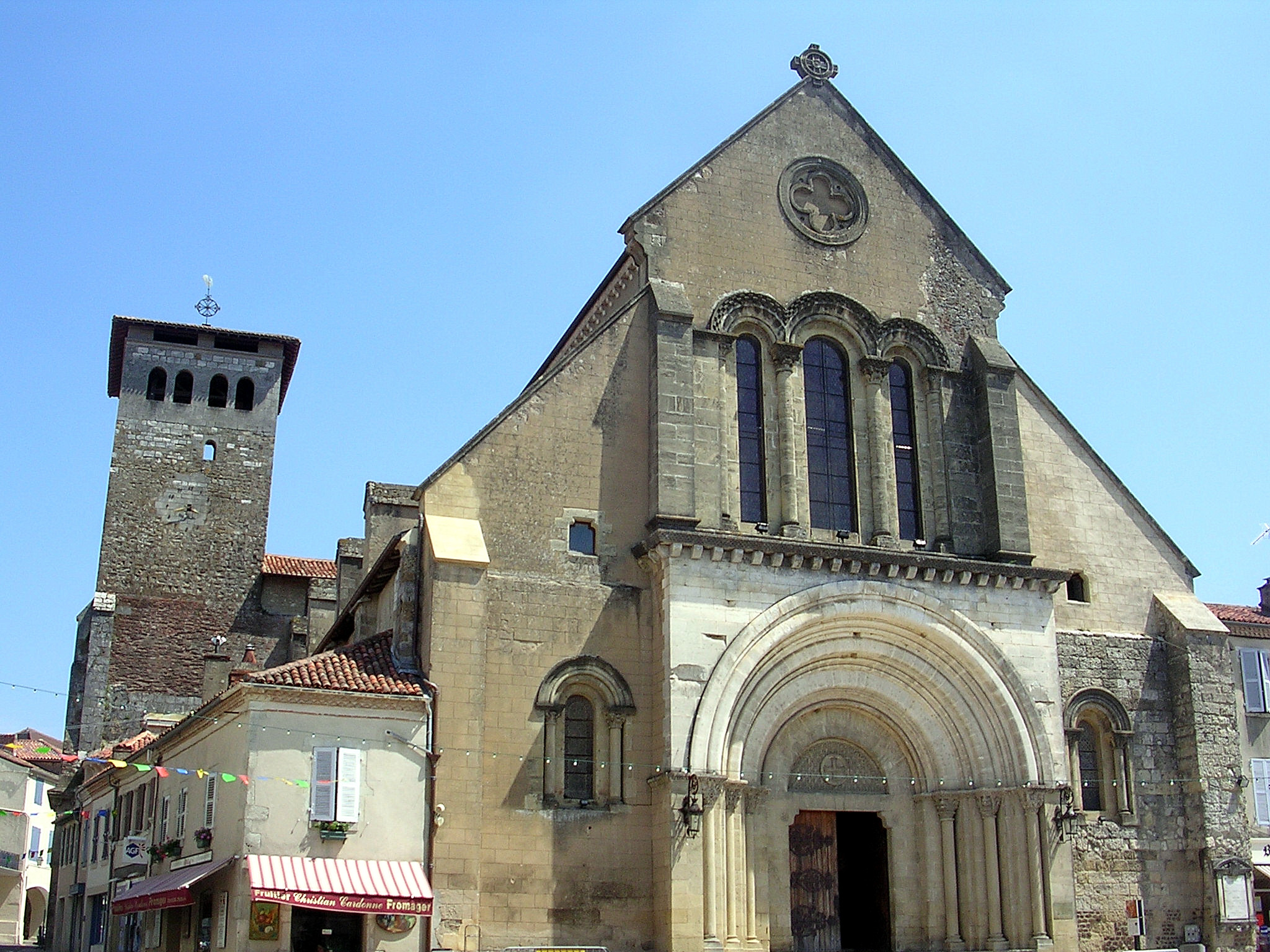
- Abbey church

- Coat of arms
- Location of Saint-Sever
- Location within France Location within Nouvelle-Aquitaine
- Coordinates: 43°45′27″N 0°34′23″W
- Country: France
- Region: Nouvelle-Aquitaine
- Department: Landes
- Arrondissement: Mont-de-Marsan
- Canton: Chalosse Tursan

Government
  - Mayor (2020–2026): Arnaud Tauzin
- Area^{1}: 46.96 km^{2} (18.13 sq mi)
- Highest elevation: 118 m (387 ft)
- Lowest elevation: 26 m (85 ft)
- Population (2023): 5,043
  - Density: 107.4/km^{2} (278.1/sq mi)
- Time zone: UTC+01:00 (CET)
  - Summer (DST): UTC+02:00 (CEST)
- INSEE/Postal code: 40282 /40500
- ^{1} French Land Register data, which excludes lakes, ponds, glaciers > 1 km^{2} (0.386 sq mi or 247 acres) and river estuaries.

Saint-Sever (French pronunciation: [sɛ̃səve], Gascon Sent Sever [sensebe]) is a commune in the Landes department in Nouvelle-Aquitaine in southwestern France.

== History and geography ==
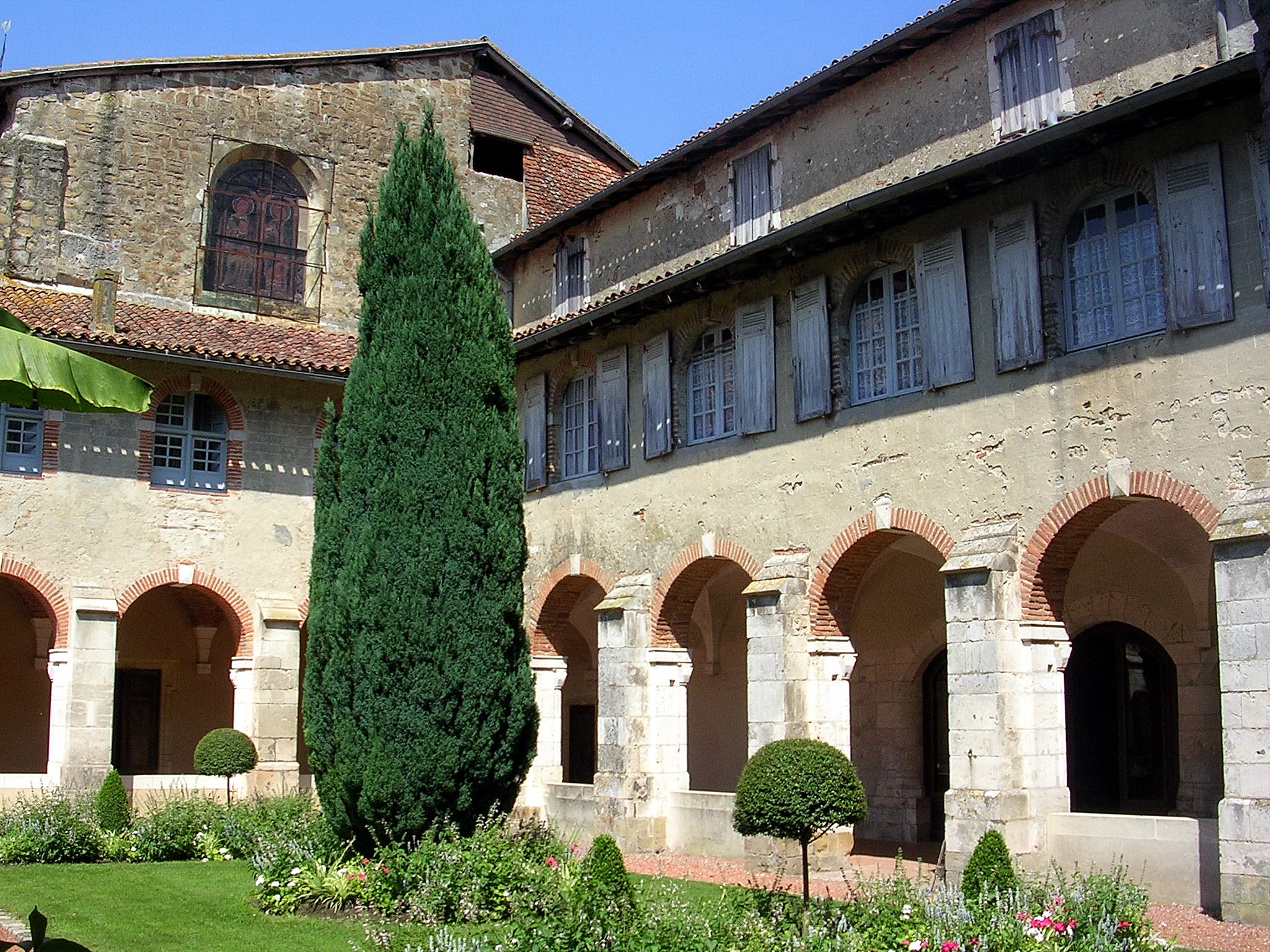
Abbey cloister

Saint-Sever stands on an eminence. It is 17 km (11 mi) south of Mont-de-Marsan, on the left bank of the Adour in the Chalosse area.

Neighboring communes: Benquet, Bas-Mauco, Audignon, Cauna, Aurice, Montaut, Banos, Coudures, Eyres-Moncube, Montsoué, Montgaillard.

The town's abbey was founded by Guillaume Sanche lord of Gascony in the late 10th century. According to the monastic chronicles, this was as the result of a vow he made after the battle of Taller, in Gascony, in which he defeated the Vikings (982). In 1060, after a fire, the abbey was reconstructed on the model of Cluny under the direction of the abbot Gregori de Montaner. The Saint-Sever Beatus was the work of monks working under the direction of the same abbot; Abbot Gregori held the post from 1028 to 1072.

== Sights ==
Its streets, bordered in places by old houses, are narrow and winding. The promenade of Morlanne laid out on the site of a Roman camp called Palestrion commands a fine view of the Adour and the pine forests of the Landes.

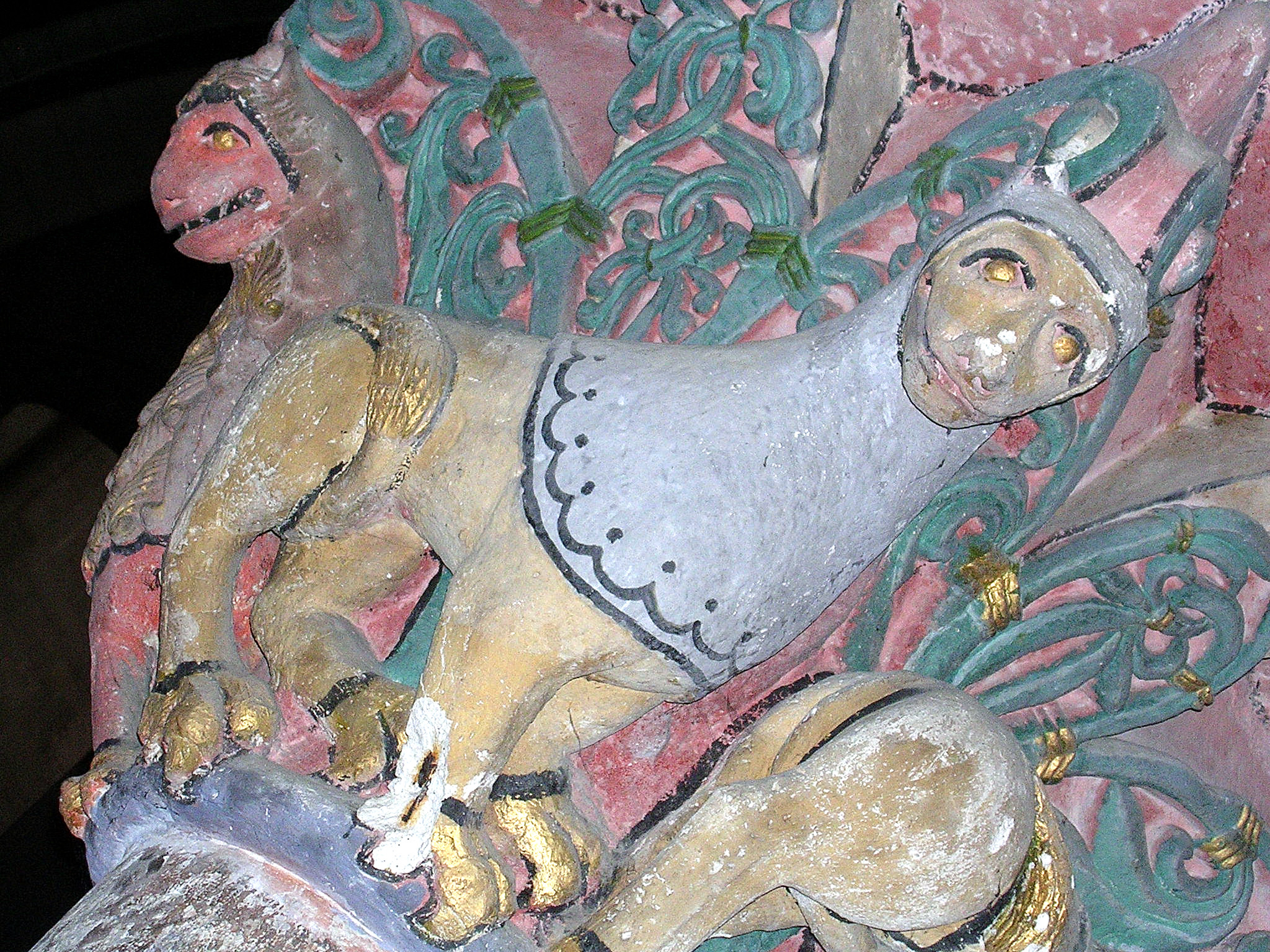
Capital in the abbey church

The church of Saint-Sever, a Romanesque building of the 12th century, with seven apses, once belonged to the Benedictine abbey founded in the 10th century. The abbey of Saint-Sever was added to the UNESCO World Heritage Sites in 1998, as part of the World Heritage Sites of the Routes of Santiago de Compostela in France.

The convent and cloister of the Jacobins (13th century), a Dominican convent, built of pink bricks; now contains the Jacobins Museum (exhibits include rocks and illuminations from the Saint-Sever Beatus).

== Population ==
Historical population

Year	Pop.	±% p.a.
1793	5,000	—
1821	5,400	+0.28%
1846	5,010	−0.30%
1872	4,734	−0.22%
1901	4,769	+0.03%
1926	4,022	−0.68%
1946	3,727	−0.38%
1962	3,983	+0.42%
1968	4,360	+1.52%

Year	Pop.	±% p.a.
1975	4,716	+1.13%
1982	4,716	+0.00%
1990	4,536	−0.49%
1999	4,455	−0.20%
2007	4,685	+0.63%
2012	4,733	+0.20%
2017	4,955	+0.92%
2023	5,043	+0.29%

Source: EHESS and INSEE (1968-2023)

== Institutions ==
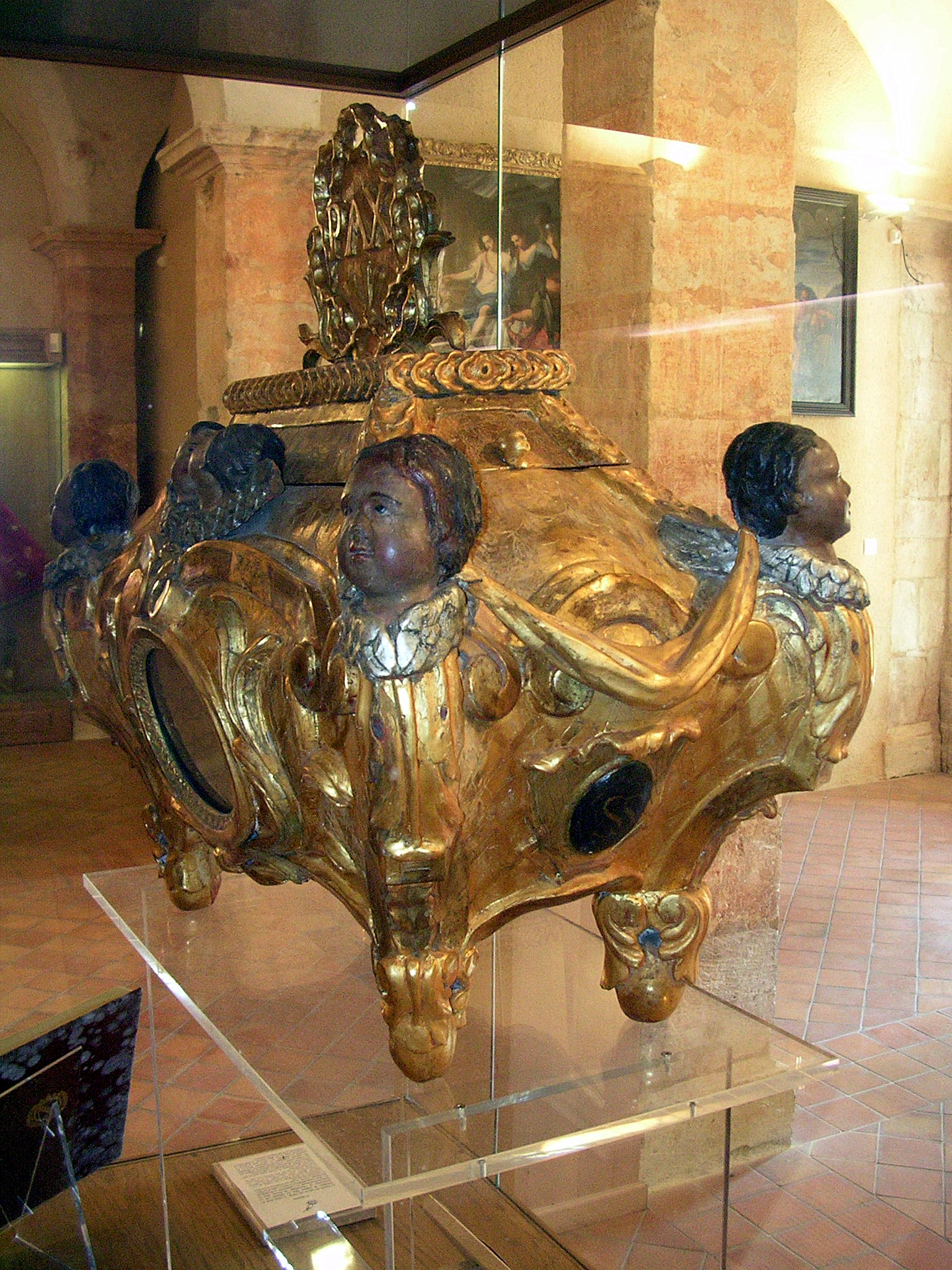
Reliquary of Saint Severus of Novempopulania in the abbey

The public institutions of the town include the sub-prefecture, a tribunal of first instance, and a practical school of agriculture and viticulture which occupies a former Dominican convent.

== See also ==
- Communes of the Landes department
- Saint Sever en el Círculo Románico
