= Château de Tartas =

Castle in the commune of Tartas, Gascony

The Château de Tartas was a castle in the commune of Tartas, Gascony, within the modern-day Landes department of France. No remains of the castle exist above ground.

== History ==
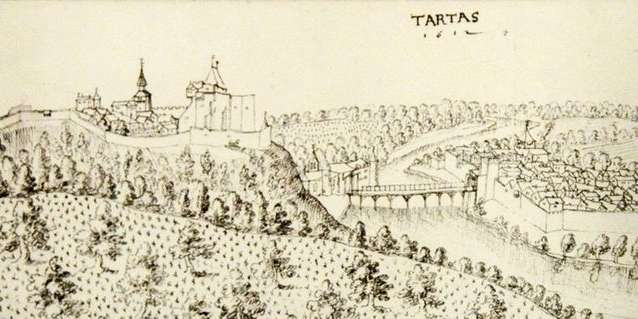
17th century sketch of Tartas and castle

Positioned along the strategic route between Dax and Mont-de-Marsan, it served as the seat of the Viscounty of Tartas. The castle was positioned on a hill overlooking the Midouze river.

During the late stages of the Hundred Years' War, Tartas was the site of the Siege of Tartas (31 August 1440 – 24 June 1442), involving English forces and their Gascon allies against Charles II of Albret and French forces, with the town and castle handed over to the Kingdom of France.
