= Mant =

- Commune
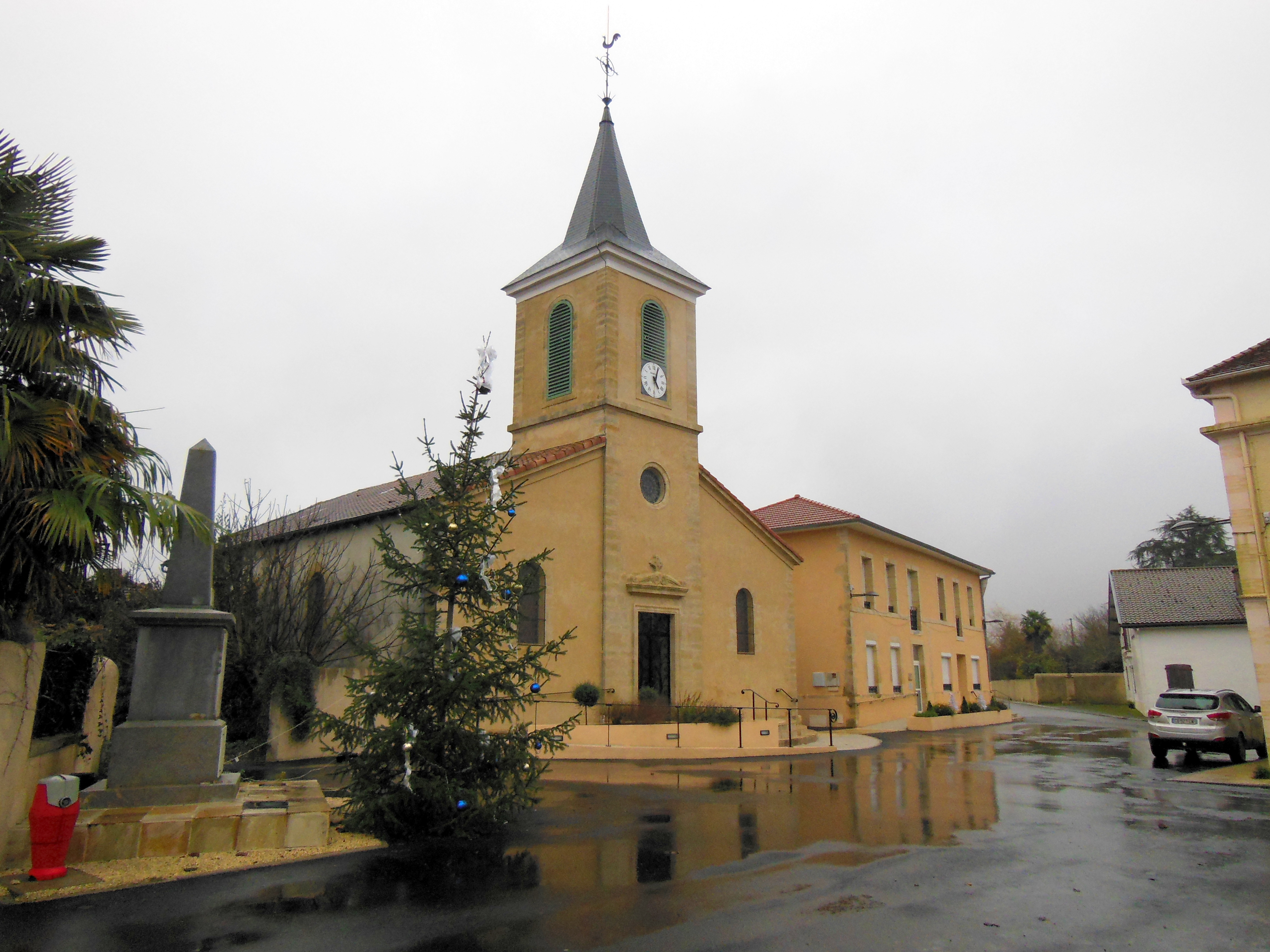
- The church in Mant
- Location of Mant
- Location within France Location within Nouvelle-Aquitaine
- Coordinates: 43°35′12″N 0°30′28″W
- Country: France
- Region: Nouvelle-Aquitaine
- Department: Landes
- Arrondissement: Mont-de-Marsan
- Canton: Chalosse Tursan
- Intercommunality: Chalosse Tursan

Government
  - Mayor (2026–32): Pierre Salles
- Area^{1}: 19.34 km^{2} (7.47 sq mi)
- Elevation: 140 m (460 ft)
- Highest elevation: 208 m (682 ft)
- Lowest elevation: 68 m (223 ft)
- Population (2023): 268
  - Density: 13.9/km^{2} (35.9/sq mi)
- Time zone: UTC+01:00 (CET)
  - Summer (DST): UTC+02:00 (CEST)
- INSEE/Postal code: 40172 /40700
- ^{1} French Land Register data, which excludes lakes, ponds, glaciers > 1 km^{2} (0.386 sq mi or 247 acres) and river estuaries.

Mant (French pronunciation: [mɑ̃]) is a commune in the Landes department in Nouvelle-Aquitaine in south-western France.

== See also ==
- Communes of the Landes department
