= Coudures =

- Commune
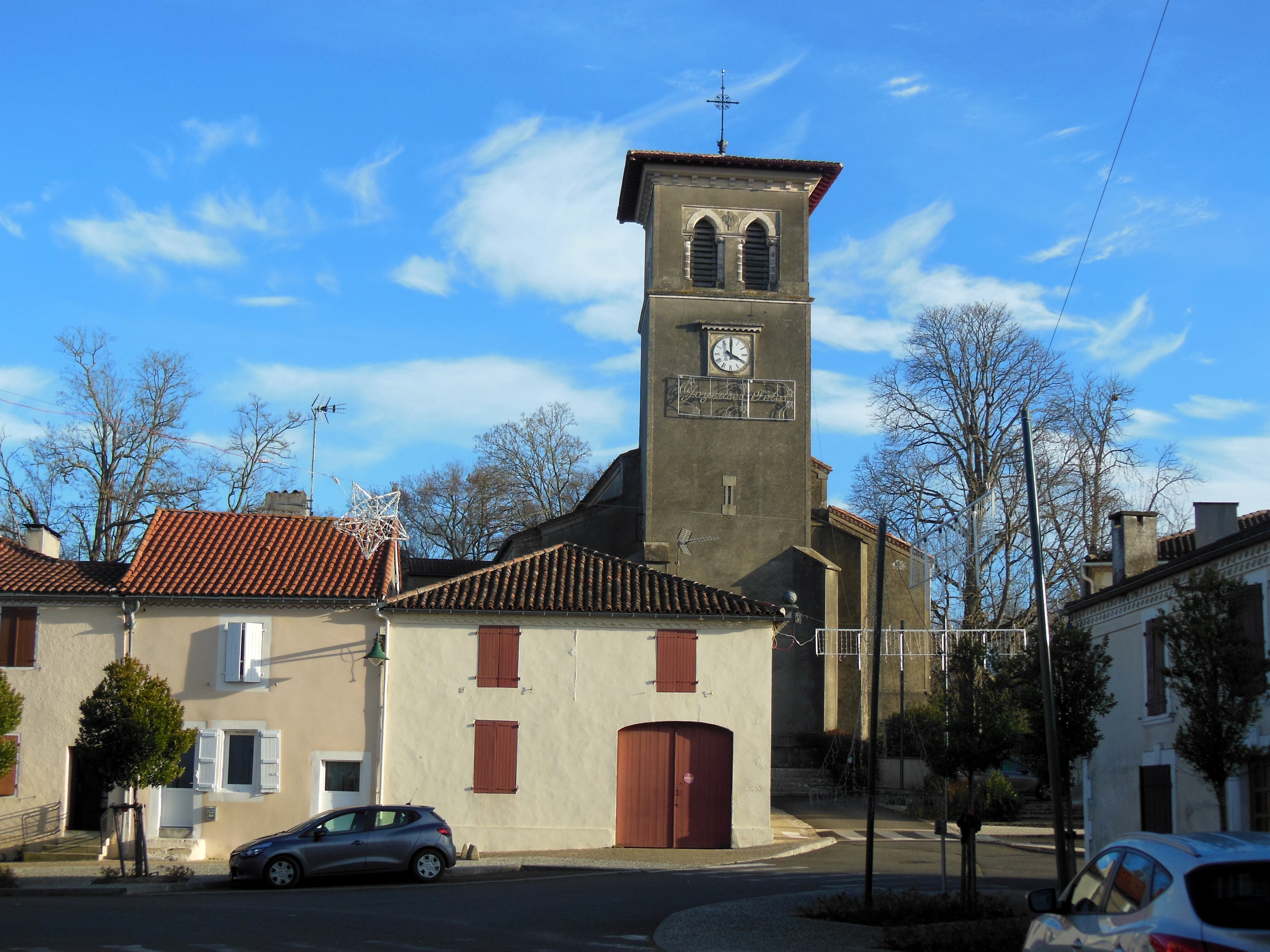
- Location of Coudures
- Location within France Location within Nouvelle-Aquitaine
- Coordinates: 43°41′31″N 0°31′10″W
- Country: France
- Region: Nouvelle-Aquitaine
- Department: Landes
- Arrondissement: Mont-de-Marsan
- Canton: Chalosse Tursan

Government
  - Mayor (2020–2026): Benoît Bancons
- Area^{1}: 11.65 km^{2} (4.50 sq mi)
- Elevation: 83 m (272 ft)
- Highest elevation: 135 m (443 ft)
- Lowest elevation: 50 m (160 ft)
- Population (2023): 571
  - Density: 49.0/km^{2} (127/sq mi)
- Time zone: UTC+01:00 (CET)
  - Summer (DST): UTC+02:00 (CEST)
- INSEE/Postal code: 40086 /40500
- ^{1} French Land Register data, which excludes lakes, ponds, glaciers > 1 km^{2} (0.386 sq mi or 247 acres) and river estuaries.

Coudures (French pronunciation: [kudyʁ]; Gascon: Coduras) is a commune in the Landes department, Nouvelle-Aquitaine, southwestern France.

It is located 8 km (5 mi) SSE of Saint-Sever and 4 km (2 mi) from Eyres-Moncube.

== Geography ==
Coudures is in the area south of the river Adour. This area is far more pronounced in altitude differences than North of the river - where the land is virtually flat for many kilometres.

From several places in Coudures it is possible to see the Pyrenees Mountains on a clear day. The Pyrenees are around 80 km (50 mi) south of the village.

== History ==
The village was established in 1305 as a bastide by the Lord of Lescun on territory of the English King Edward II. The village church was drastically remodelled at the end of the 19th century.

== Population ==
Historical population
Year	Pop.	±% p.a.
1968	449	—
1975	406	−1.43%
1982	420	+0.49%
1990	402	−0.55%
1999	384	−0.51%
2007	428	+1.37%
2012	522	+4.05%
2017	451	−2.88%
2023	571	+4.01%
Source: INSEE

There are a fairly high population of British and European immigrants in the village, making up around 5% of the population. There are also many different sub-cultures from all over France that live in the village, with a very diverse mixture from North to South, East to West.

== Sport ==
The village has a large reservoir nearby and hunting, fishing, petanque, horse riding and mountain-biking are popular local sports.

== See also ==
- Communes of the Landes department
