= Cazères-sur-l'Adour =

- Commune
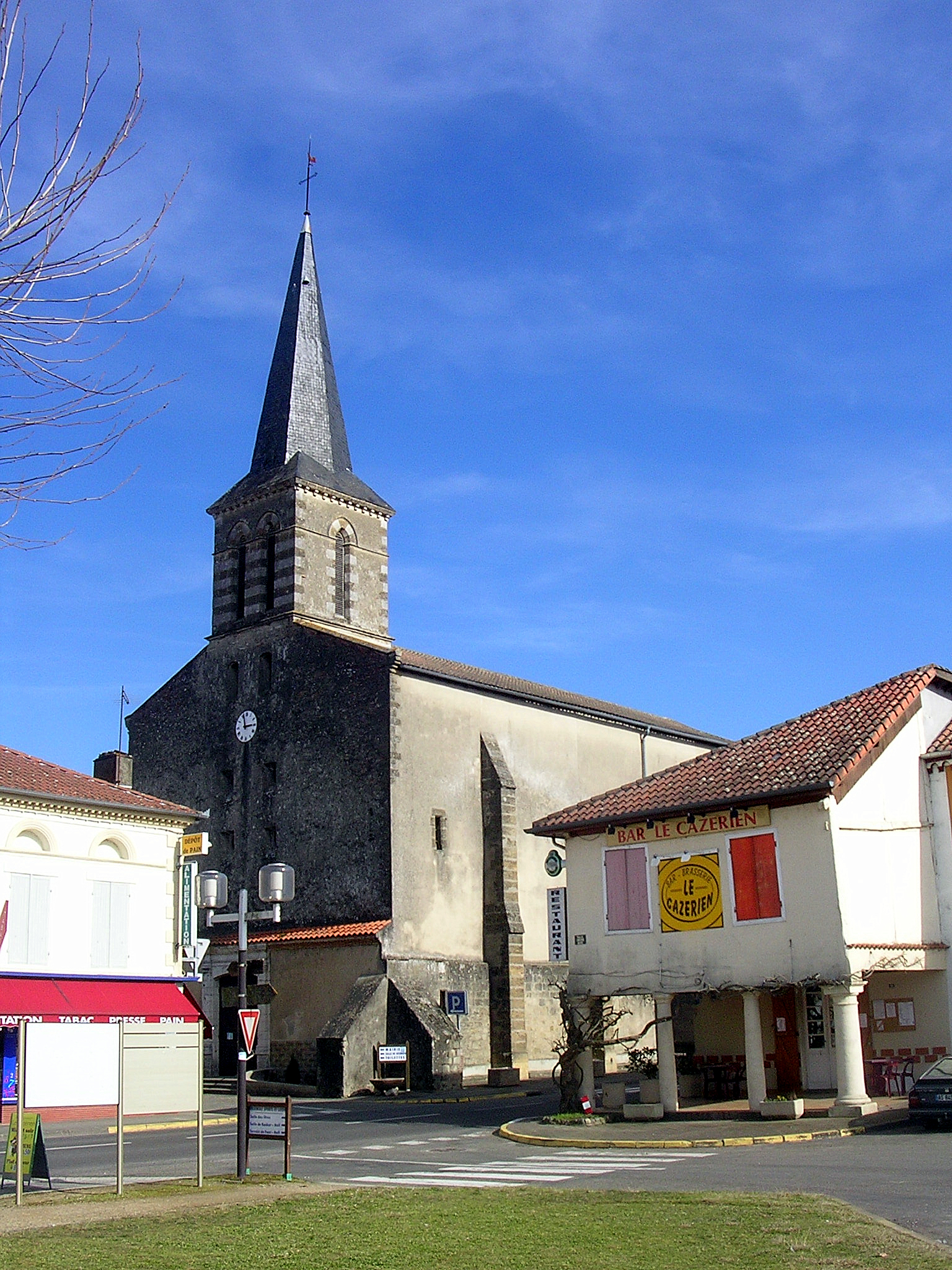
- Location of Cazères-sur-l'Adour
- Location within France Location within Nouvelle-Aquitaine
- Coordinates: 43°45′42″N 0°18′58″W
- Country: France
- Region: Nouvelle-Aquitaine
- Department: Landes
- Arrondissement: Mont-de-Marsan
- Canton: Adour Armagnac
- Intercommunality: Pays Grenadois

Government
  - Mayor (2021–2026): Jean-François Delepau
- Area^{1}: 31.25 km^{2} (12.07 sq mi)
- Elevation: 74 m (243 ft)
- Highest elevation: 139 m (456 ft)
- Lowest elevation: 62 m (203 ft)
- Population (2023): 1,128
  - Density: 36.10/km^{2} (93.49/sq mi)
- Time zone: UTC+01:00 (CET)
  - Summer (DST): UTC+02:00 (CEST)
- INSEE/Postal code: 40080 /40270
- ^{1} French Land Register data, which excludes lakes, ponds, glaciers > 1 km^{2} (0.386 sq mi or 247 acres) and river estuaries.

Cazères-sur-l'Adour (French pronunciation: [kazɛʁ syʁ laduʁ], literally Cazères on the Adour; Gascon: Casèras d'Ador) is a commune in the Landes department in Nouvelle-Aquitaine in southwestern France.

== Population ==
Historical population
Year	Pop.	±% p.a.
1968	766	—
1975	777	+0.20%
1982	815	+0.68%
1990	873	+0.86%
1999	862	−0.14%
2007	1,132	+3.46%
2012	1,120	−0.21%
2017	1,070	−0.91%
2023	1,128	+0.88%
Source: INSEE

== See also ==
- Communes of the Landes department
