= Arrondissement of Mont-de-Marsan =

Coordinates: 43°54′N 0°30′W

Mont-de-Marsan
- Arrondissement
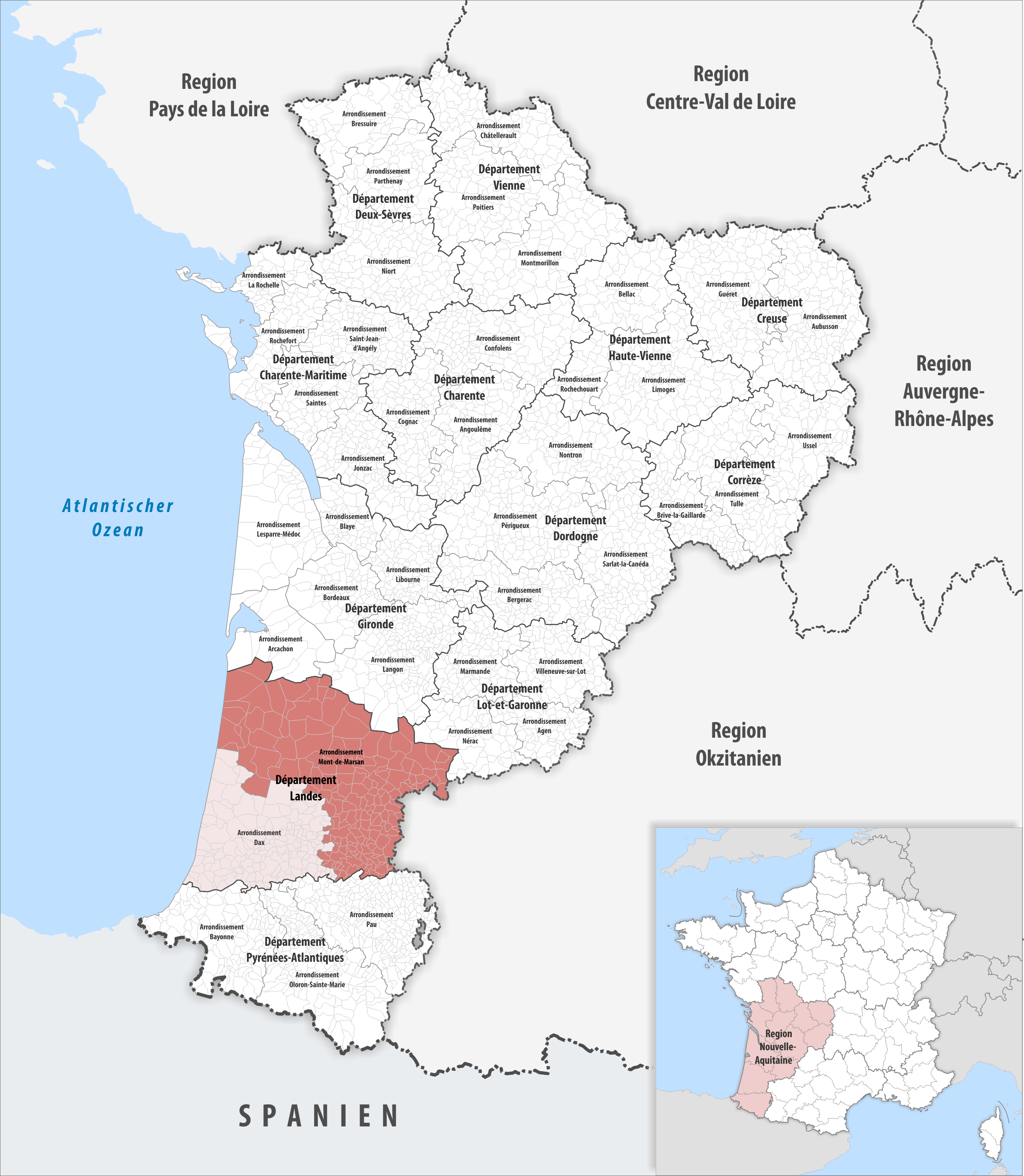
- Location within the region Nouvelle-Aquitaine
- Country: France
- Region: Nouvelle-Aquitaine
- Department: Landes
- No. of communes: {{{nbcomm}}}
- Area: 6,048.4 km^{2} (2,335.3 sq mi)
- Population (2023): 190,053
  - Density: 31.422/km^{2} (81.383/sq mi)
- INSEE code: 402

The arrondissement of Mont-de-Marsan is an arrondissement of France in the Landes department in the Nouvelle-Aquitaine region. It has 175 communes. Its population is 185,531 (2021), and its area is 6,048.4 km^{2} (2,335.3 sq mi). Its surface area of over 6,000 km^{2} is the largest of any arrondissement in Metropolitan France, its size being comparable to an entire département such as the Eure.

== Composition ==
The communes of the arrondissement of Mont-de-Marsan, and their INSEE codes, are:

1. Aire-sur-l'Adour (40001)
2. Arboucave (40005)
3. Arengosse (40006)
4. Argelouse (40008)
5. Artassenx (40012)
6. Arthez-d'Armagnac (40013)
7. Arue (40014)
8. Arx (40015)
9. Aubagnan (40016)
10. Audignon (40017)
11. Aureilhan (40019)
12. Aurice (40020)
13. Bahus-Soubiran (40022)
14. Banos (40024)
15. Bascons (40025)
16. Bas-Mauco (40026)
17. Bats (40029)
18. Baudignan (40030)
19. Belhade (40032)
20. Bélis (40033)
21. Benquet (40037)
22. Betbezer-d'Armagnac (40039)
23. Bias (40043)
24. Biscarrosse (40046)
25. Bordères-et-Lamensans (40049)
26. Bostens (40050)
27. Bougue (40051)
28. Bourdalat (40052)
29. Bourriot-Bergonce (40053)
30. Bretagne-de-Marsan (40055)
31. Brocas (40056)
32. Buanes (40057)
33. Cachen (40058)
34. Callen (40060)
35. Campagne (40061)
36. Campet-et-Lamolère (40062)
37. Canenx-et-Réaut (40064)
38. Castandet (40070)
39. Castelnau-Tursan (40072)
40. Castelner (40073)
41. Cauna (40076)
42. Cazalis (40079)
43. Cazères-sur-l'Adour (40080)
44. Cère (40081)
45. Classun (40082)
46. Clèdes (40083)
47. Commensacq (40085)
48. Coudures (40086)
49. Créon-d'Armagnac (40087)
50. Duhort-Bachen (40091)
51. Dumes (40092)
52. Escalans (40093)
53. Escource (40094)
54. Estigarde (40096)
55. Eugénie-les-Bains (40097)
56. Eyres-Moncube (40098)
57. Fargues (40099)
58. Le Frêche (40100)
59. Gabarret (40102)
60. Gaillères (40103)
61. Garein (40105)
62. Gastes (40108)
63. Geaune (40110)
64. Geloux (40111)
65. Grenade-sur-l'Adour (40117)
66. Hagetmau (40119)
67. Haut-Mauco (40122)
68. Herré (40124)
69. Hontanx (40127)
70. Horsarrieu (40128)
71. Labastide-Chalosse (40130)
72. Labastide-d'Armagnac (40131)
73. Labouheyre (40134)
74. Labrit (40135)
75. Lacajunte (40136)
76. Lacquy (40137)
77. Lacrabe (40138)
78. Laglorieuse (40139)
79. Lagrange (40140)
80. Larrivière-Saint-Savin (40145)
81. Latrille (40146)
82. Lauret (40148)
83. Lencouacq (40149)
84. Lesperon (40152)
85. Liposthey (40156)
86. Losse (40158)
87. Lubbon (40161)
88. Lucbardez-et-Bargues (40162)
89. Lüe (40163)
90. Luglon (40165)
91. Lussagnet (40166)
92. Luxey (40167)
93. Maillas (40169)
94. Maillères (40170)
95. Mano (40171)
96. Mant (40172)
97. Mauries (40174)
98. Maurrin (40175)
99. Mauvezin-d'Armagnac (40176)
100. Mazerolles (40178)
101. Mézos (40182)
102. Mimizan (40184)
103. Miramont-Sensacq (40185)
104. Momuy (40188)
105. Monget (40189)
106. Monségur (40190)
107. Montaut (40191)
108. Mont-de-Marsan (40192)
109. Montégut (40193)
110. Montgaillard (40195)
111. Montsoué (40196)
112. Morcenx-la-Nouvelle (40197)
113. Morganx (40198)
114. Moustey (40200)
115. Onesse-Laharie (40210)
116. Ousse-Suzan (40215)
117. Parentis-en-Born (40217)
118. Parleboscq (40218)
119. Payros-Cazautets (40219)
120. Pécorade (40220)
121. Perquie (40221)
122. Peyre (40223)
123. Philondenx (40225)
124. Pimbo (40226)
125. Pissos (40227)
126. Pontenx-les-Forges (40229)
127. Poudenx (40232)
128. Pouydesseaux (40234)
129. Pujo-le-Plan (40238)
130. Puyol-Cazalet (40239)
131. Renung (40240)
132. Retjons (40164)
133. Rimbez-et-Baudiets (40242)
134. Roquefort (40245)
135. Sabres (40246)
136. Saint-Agnet (40247)
137. Saint-Avit (40250)
138. Saint-Cricq-Chalosse (40253)
139. Saint-Cricq-Villeneuve (40255)
140. Sainte-Colombe (40252)
141. Sainte-Eulalie-en-Born (40257)
142. Sainte-Foy (40258)
143. Saint-Gein (40259)
144. Saint-Gor (40262)
145. Saint-Julien-d'Armagnac (40265)
146. Saint-Justin (40267)
147. Saint-Loubouer (40270)
148. Saint-Martin-d'Oney (40274)
149. Saint-Maurice-sur-Adour (40275)
150. Saint-Paul-en-Born (40278)
151. Saint-Perdon (40280)
152. Saint-Pierre-du-Mont (40281)
153. Saint-Sever (40282)
154. Samadet (40286)
155. Sanguinet (40287)
156. Sarbazan (40288)
157. Sarraziet (40289)
158. Sarron (40290)
159. Saugnacq-et-Muret (40295)
160. Le Sen (40297)
161. Serres-Gaston (40298)
162. Serreslous-et-Arribans (40299)
163. Solférino (40303)
164. Sorbets (40305)
165. Sore (40307)
166. Trensacq (40319)
167. Uchacq-et-Parentis (40320)
168. Urgons (40321)
169. Vert (40323)
170. Vielle-Soubiran (40327)
171. Vielle-Tursan (40325)
172. Le Vignau (40329)
173. Villeneuve-de-Marsan (40331)
174. Ychoux (40332)
175. Ygos-Saint-Saturnin (40333)

== History ==
The arrondissement of Mont-de-Marsan was created in 1800.

As a result of the reorganisation of the cantons of France which came into effect in 2015, the borders of the cantons are no longer related to the borders of the arrondissements. The cantons of the arrondissement of Mont-de-Marsan were, as of January 2015:

1. Aire-sur-l'Adour
2. Gabarret
3. Geaune
4. Grenade-sur-l'Adour
5. Hagetmau
6. Labrit
7. Mimizan
8. Mont-de-Marsan-Nord
9. Mont-de-Marsan-Sud
10. Morcenx
11. Parentis-en-Born
12. Pissos
13. Roquefort
14. Sabres
15. Saint-Sever
16. Sore
17. Villeneuve-de-Marsan
