= Viscounty of Tartas =

Viscounty in Gascony

The Viscountcy of Tartas was a viscounty in Gascony, located within the modern-day Landes department of France. Centered on Tartas, the viscountcy existed from the early 11th century.

== Geography ==
Tartas stood between Dax and Mont-de-Marsan in Gascony, with the fortress of the viscounty at Château de Tartas.

== History ==
The viscounty is first recorded in the 11th century.

From 1338, the viscountcy of Tartas was held in union with the lordship of Albret.

== List of viscounts ==
- Robert
- Raymond-Robert
- Arnaud-Raymond
- Robert II
- Raymond-Robert II
- Robert III
- Arnaud-Raymond II
- Raymond (died 1312)
- Mathe of Albret, Viscountess (died 1338)
- Bernard Ezi II of Albret
- Jean I of Albret
- Alain of Albret
- John III of Navarre
