= Losse, Landes =

Losse
- Commune
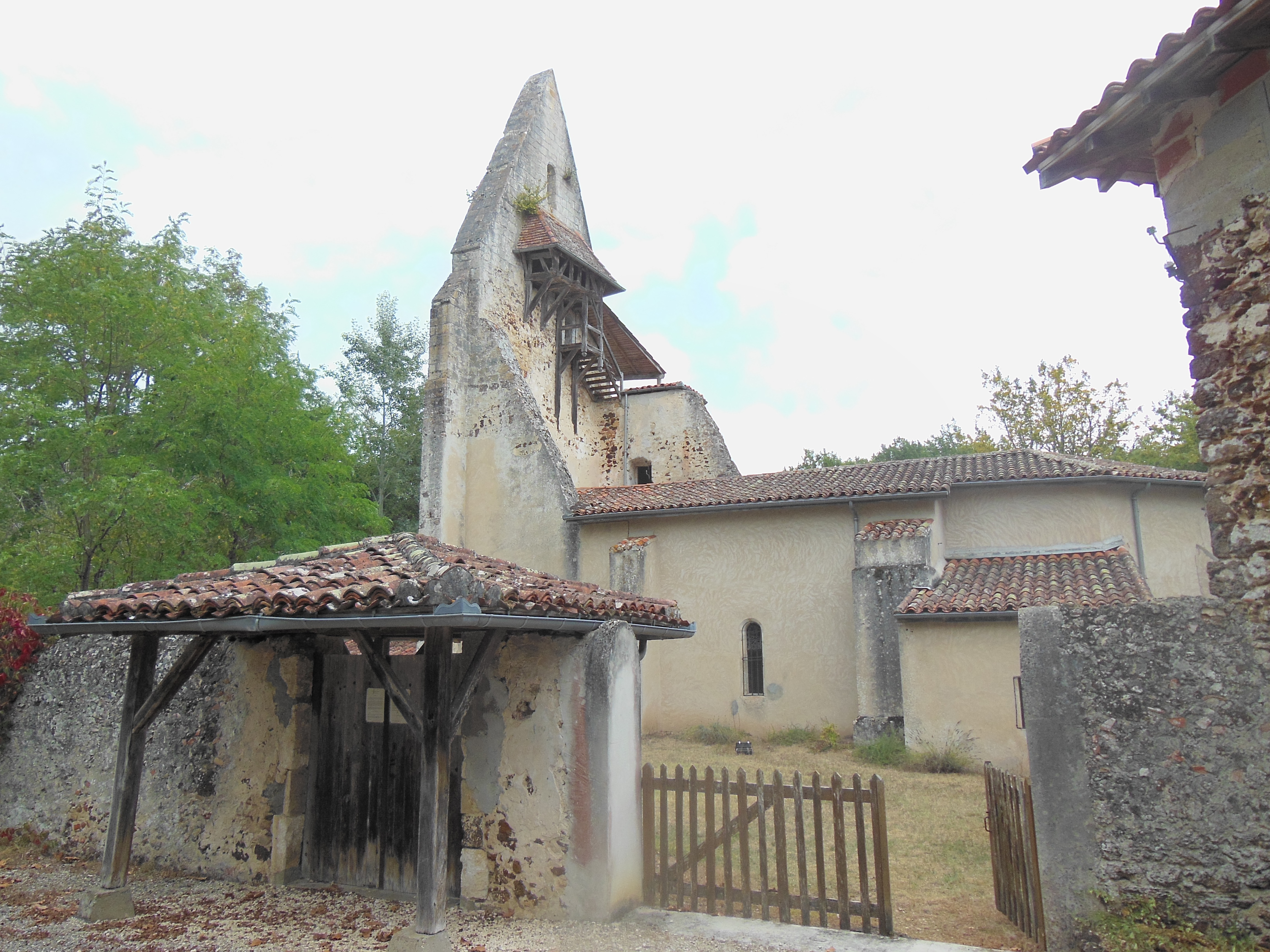
- The church of Lussolle, in Losse
- Location of Losse
- Location within France Location within Nouvelle-Aquitaine
- Coordinates: 44°06′36″N 0°06′06″W
- Country: France
- Region: Nouvelle-Aquitaine
- Department: Landes
- Arrondissement: Mont-de-Marsan
- Canton: Haute Lande Armagnac
- Intercommunality: Landes d'Armagnac

Government
  - Mayor (2020–2026): Bruno Lacoste
- Area^{1}: 102.69 km^{2} (39.65 sq mi)
- Elevation: 152 m (499 ft)
- Highest elevation: 157 m (515 ft)
- Lowest elevation: 95 m (312 ft)
- Population (2023): 286
  - Density: 2.79/km^{2} (7.21/sq mi)
- Time zone: UTC+01:00 (CET)
  - Summer (DST): UTC+02:00 (CEST)
- INSEE/Postal code: 40158 /40240
- ^{1} French Land Register data, which excludes lakes, ponds, glaciers > 1 km^{2} (0.386 sq mi or 247 acres) and river estuaries.

Losse (French pronunciation: [lɔs]; Occitan: Lòssa) is a commune in the Landes department in Nouvelle-Aquitaine in south-western France.

== See also ==
- Communes of the Landes department
