= Miramont-Sensacq =

- Commune
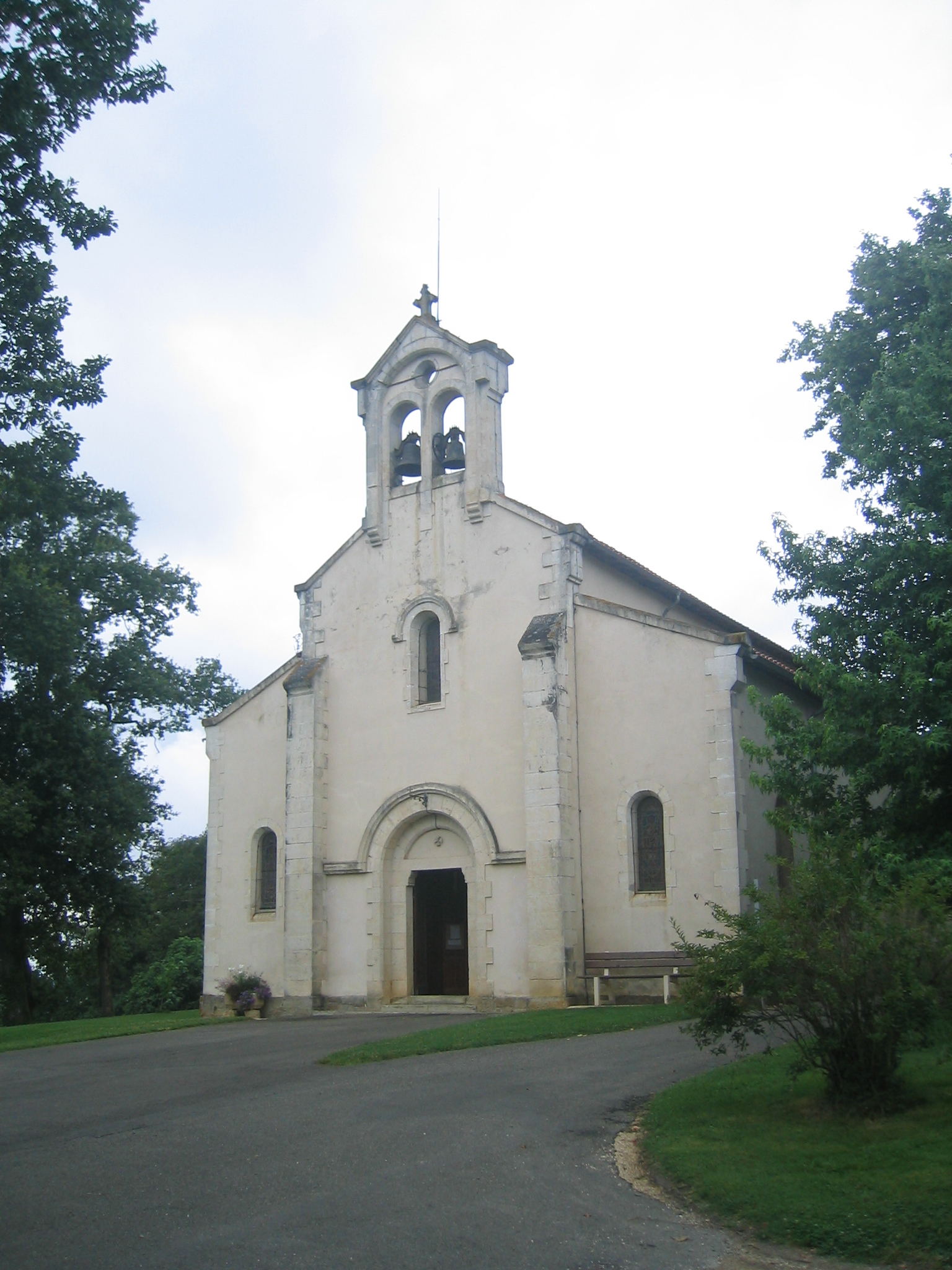
- The church of Miramont-Sensacq
- Location of Miramont-Sensacq
- Location within France Location within Nouvelle-Aquitaine
- Coordinates: 43°35′45″N 0°19′33″W
- Country: France
- Region: Nouvelle-Aquitaine
- Department: Landes
- Arrondissement: Mont-de-Marsan
- Canton: Chalosse Tursan
- Intercommunality: Chalosse Tursan

Government
  - Mayor (2020–2026): Pascal Beaumont
- Area^{1}: 25.32 km^{2} (9.78 sq mi)
- Highest elevation: 221 m (725 ft)
- Lowest elevation: 111 m (364 ft)
- Population (2023): 342
  - Density: 13.5/km^{2} (35.0/sq mi)
- Time zone: UTC+01:00 (CET)
  - Summer (DST): UTC+02:00 (CEST)
- INSEE/Postal code: 40185 /40320
- ^{1} French Land Register data, which excludes lakes, ponds, glaciers > 1 km^{2} (0.386 sq mi or 247 acres) and river estuaries.

Miramont-Sensacq is a commune in the Landes department in Nouvelle-Aquitaine in south-western France.

== See also ==
- Communes of the Landes department
