= Hagetmau =

- Commune
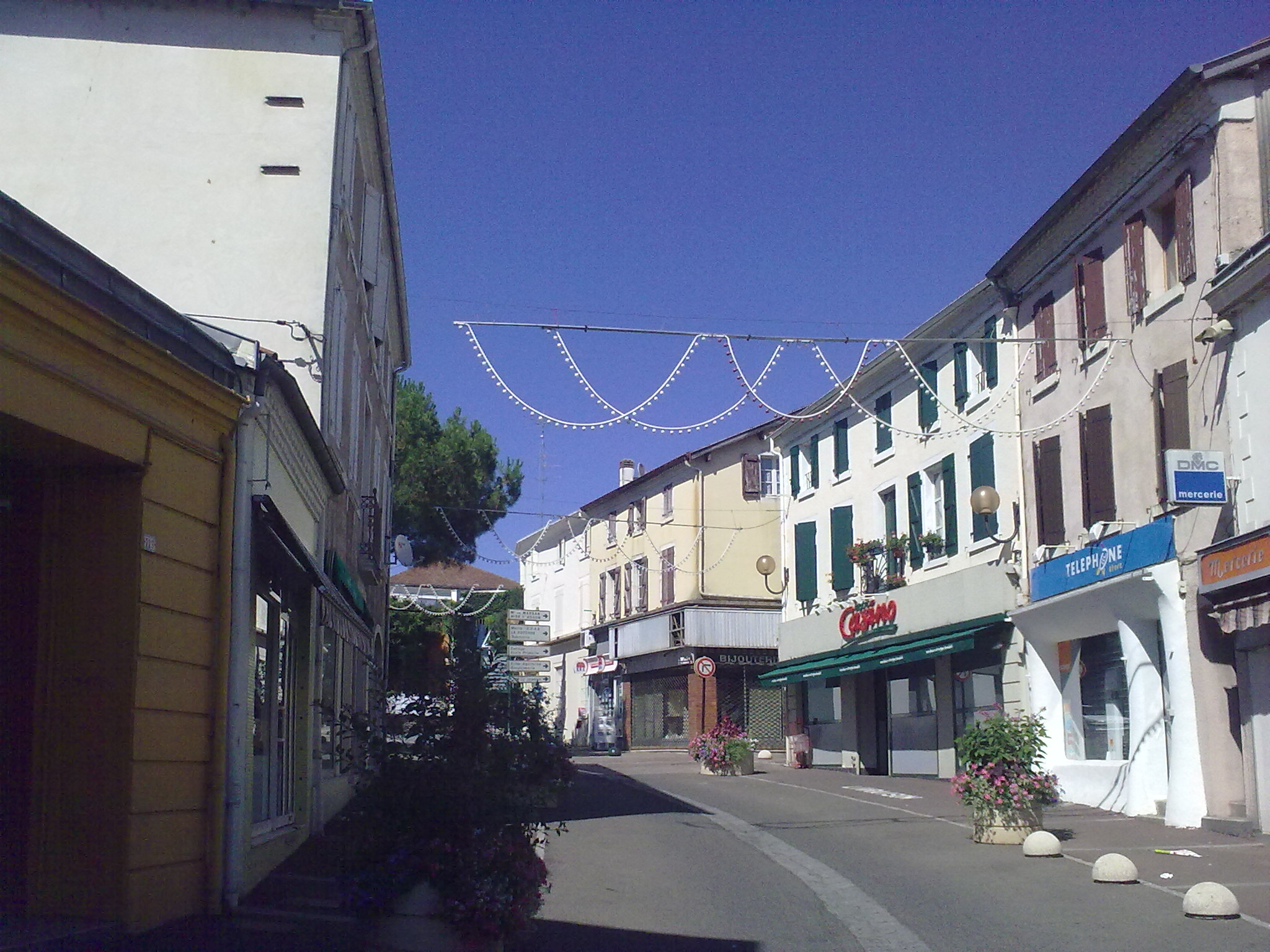

- Coat of arms
- Location of Hagetmau
- Location within France Location within Nouvelle-Aquitaine
- Coordinates: 43°39′22″N 0°35′33″W
- Country: France
- Region: Nouvelle-Aquitaine
- Department: Landes
- Arrondissement: Mont-de-Marsan
- Canton: Chalosse Tursan

Government
  - Mayor (2020–2026): Pascale Requenna
- Area^{1}: 28.37 km^{2} (10.95 sq mi)
- Elevation: 100 m (330 ft)
- Highest elevation: 142 m (466 ft)
- Lowest elevation: 72 m (236 ft)
- Population (2023): 4,624
  - Density: 163.0/km^{2} (422.1/sq mi)
- Time zone: UTC+01:00 (CET)
  - Summer (DST): UTC+02:00 (CEST)
- INSEE/Postal code: 40119 /40700
- ^{1} French Land Register data, which excludes lakes, ponds, glaciers > 1 km^{2} (0.386 sq mi or 247 acres) and river estuaries.

Hagetmau (French pronunciation: [aʒɛtmo]) is a commune in the Landes department in Nouvelle-Aquitaine in southwestern France.

== Sights ==
- Crypte de Saint-Girons

== Population ==
Historical population

Year	Pop.	±% p.a.
1793	2,284	—
1821	2,660	+0.55%
1846	3,100	+0.61%
1872	3,049	−0.06%
1901	3,123	+0.08%
1926	2,882	−0.32%
1946	2,870	−0.02%
1962	3,376	+1.02%
1968	3,755	+1.79%

Year	Pop.	±% p.a.
1975	4,318	+2.02%
1982	4,514	+0.64%
1990	4,449	−0.18%
1999	4,403	−0.12%
2007	4,549	+0.41%
2012	4,546	−0.01%
2017	4,690	+0.63%
2023	4,624	−0.24%

Source: EHESS and INSEE (1968-2023)

== Notable residents ==
The sociologist Henri Lefebvre was born here in 1901.

== See also ==
- Communes of the Landes department
