= Urgons =

- Commune
- Location of Urgons
- Location within France Location within Nouvelle-Aquitaine
- Coordinates: 43°38′59″N 0°26′31″W
- Country: France
- Region: Nouvelle-Aquitaine
- Department: Landes
- Arrondissement: Mont-de-Marsan
- Canton: Chalosse Tursan

Government
  - Mayor (2020–2026): Roland Dufourcq
- Area^{1}: 11.53 km^{2} (4.45 sq mi)
- Elevation: 152 m (499 ft)
- Highest elevation: 160 m (520 ft)
- Lowest elevation: 72 m (236 ft)
- Population (2023): 244
  - Density: 21.2/km^{2} (54.8/sq mi)
- Time zone: UTC+01:00 (CET)
  - Summer (DST): UTC+02:00 (CEST)
- INSEE/Postal code: 40321 /40320
- ^{1} French Land Register data, which excludes lakes, ponds, glaciers > 1 km^{2} (0.386 sq mi or 247 acres) and river estuaries.

Urgons is a commune in the Landes department in Nouvelle-Aquitaine in southwestern France.

== Population ==
Historical population
Year	Pop.	±% p.a.
1968	324	—
1975	274	−2.37%
1982	265	−0.48%
1990	261	−0.19%
1999	251	−0.43%
2007	259	+0.39%
2012	264	+0.38%
2017	252	−0.93%
2023	244	−0.54%
Source: INSEE

== See also ==
- Communes of the Landes department
