= Duhort-Bachen =

- Commune
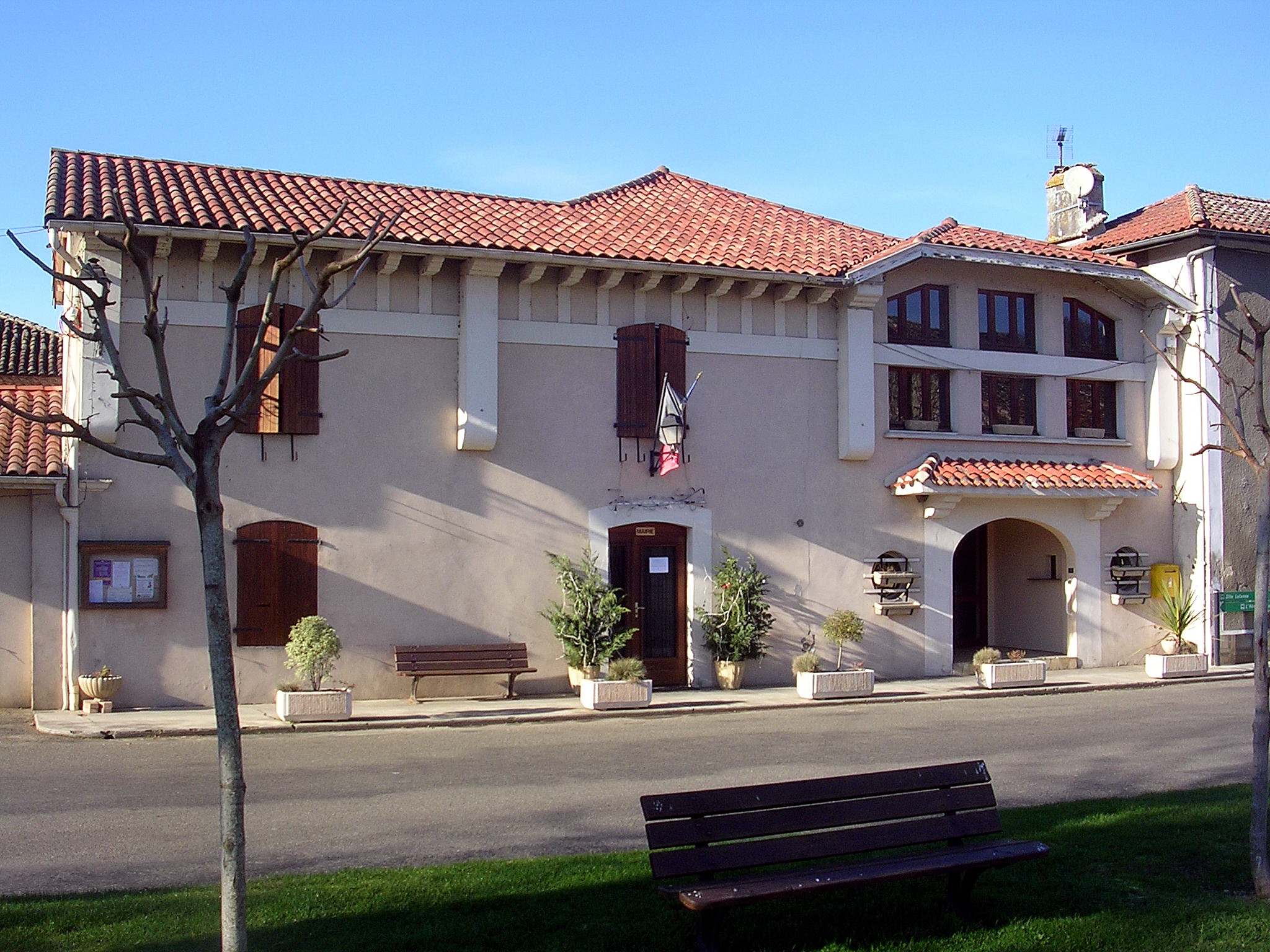
- Town hall
- Location of Duhort-Bachen
- Location within France Location within Nouvelle-Aquitaine
- Coordinates: 43°43′33″N 0°19′18″W
- Country: France
- Region: Nouvelle-Aquitaine
- Department: Landes
- Arrondissement: Mont-de-Marsan
- Canton: Adour Armagnac
- Intercommunality: Aire-sur-l'Adour

Government
  - Mayor (2020–2026): Vincent Lafargue
- Area^{1}: 34.17 km^{2} (13.19 sq mi)
- Elevation: 50 m (160 ft)
- Highest elevation: 159 m (522 ft)
- Lowest elevation: 64 m (210 ft)
- Population (2023): 700
  - Density: 20/km^{2} (53/sq mi)
- Time zone: UTC+01:00 (CET)
  - Summer (DST): UTC+02:00 (CEST)
- INSEE/Postal code: 40091 /40800
- ^{1} French Land Register data, which excludes lakes, ponds, glaciers > 1 km^{2} (0.386 sq mi or 247 acres) and river estuaries.

Duhort-Bachen (French pronunciation: [dyɔʁ baʃɛ̃]; Gascon: Dur Hòrt e Baishen) is a commune in the Landes department in Nouvelle-Aquitaine in southwestern France.

== Population ==
Historical population
Year	Pop.	±% p.a.
1968	584	—
1975	553	−0.78%
1982	572	+0.48%
1990	600	+0.60%
1999	602	+0.04%
2007	619	+0.35%
2012	653	+1.08%
2017	664	+0.33%
2023	700	+0.88%
Source: INSEE

== See also ==
- Communes of the Landes department
