= Payros-Cazautets =

- Commune
- Location of Payros-Cazautets
- Location within France Location within Nouvelle-Aquitaine
- Coordinates: 43°37′38″N 0°23′19″W
- Country: France
- Region: Nouvelle-Aquitaine
- Department: Landes
- Arrondissement: Mont-de-Marsan
- Canton: Chalosse Tursan

Government
  - Mayor (2020–2026): Alain Dulucq
- Area^{1}: 6.35 km^{2} (2.45 sq mi)
- Elevation: 151 m (495 ft)
- Highest elevation: 166 m (545 ft)
- Lowest elevation: 79 m (259 ft)
- Population (2023): 105
  - Density: 16.5/km^{2} (42.8/sq mi)
- Time zone: UTC+01:00 (CET)
  - Summer (DST): UTC+02:00 (CEST)
- INSEE/Postal code: 40219 /40320
- ^{1} French Land Register data, which excludes lakes, ponds, glaciers > 1 km^{2} (0.386 sq mi or 247 acres) and river estuaries.

Payros-Cazautets (Gascon: Peiròs-Casauteths) is a commune in the Landes department in Nouvelle-Aquitaine in southwestern France.

== Population ==
Historical population
Year	Pop.	±% p.a.
1968	91	—
1975	88	−0.48%
1982	96	+1.25%
1990	94	−0.26%
1999	100	+0.69%
2007	89	−1.45%
2012	103	+2.96%
2017	106	+0.58%
2023	105	−0.16%
Source: INSEE

== See also ==
- Communes of the Landes department
