= Geaune =

- Commune
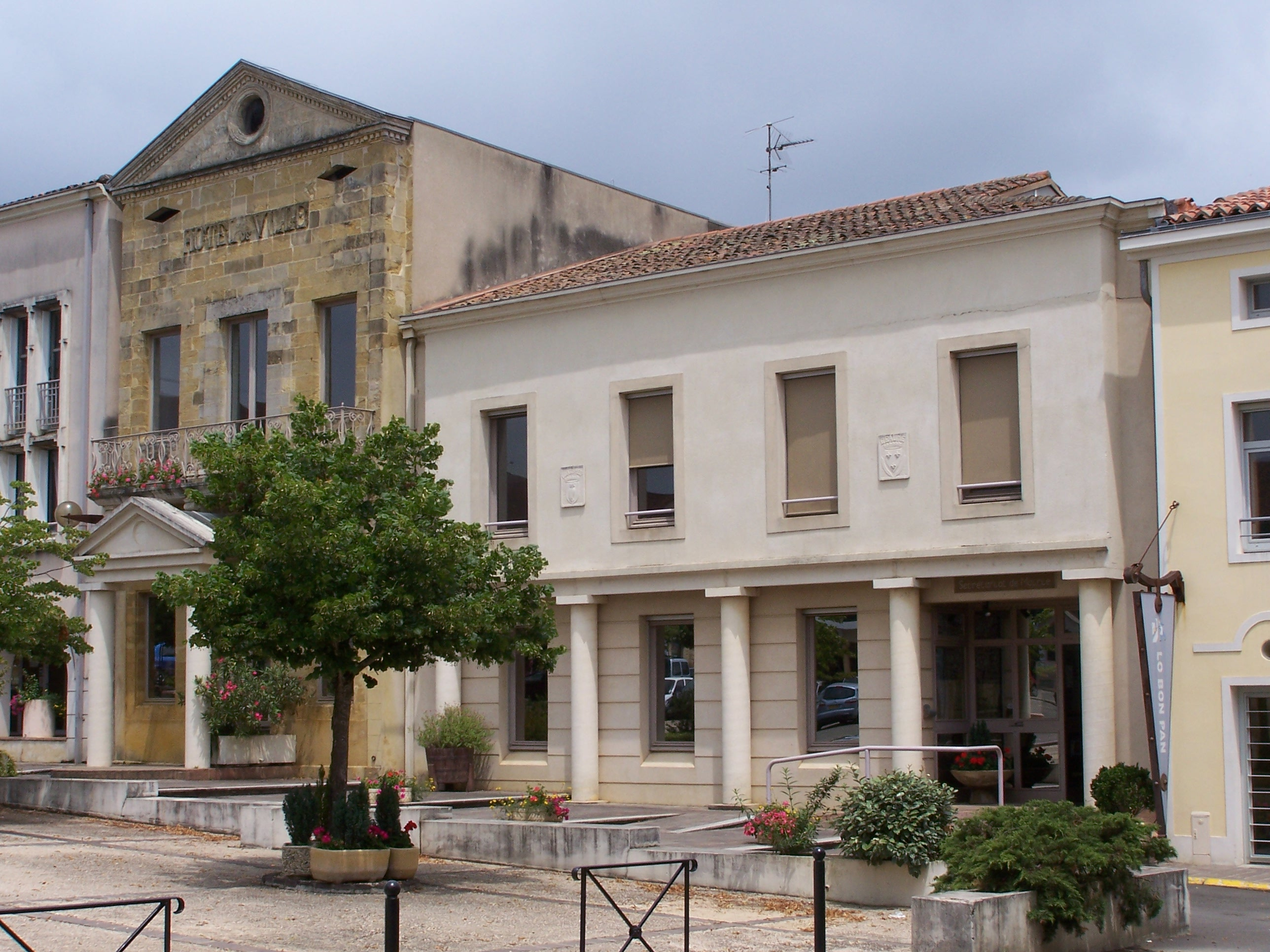
- Town hall

- Coat of arms
- Location of Geaune
- Location within France Location within Nouvelle-Aquitaine
- Coordinates: 43°38′27″N 0°22′39″W
- Country: France
- Region: Nouvelle-Aquitaine
- Department: Landes
- Arrondissement: Mont-de-Marsan
- Canton: Chalosse Tursan

Government
  - Mayor (2020–2026): Gilles Couture
- Area^{1}: 10.53 km^{2} (4.07 sq mi)
- Elevation: 112 m (367 ft)
- Highest elevation: 221 m (725 ft)
- Lowest elevation: 82 m (269 ft)
- Population (2023): 767
  - Density: 72.8/km^{2} (189/sq mi)
- Time zone: UTC+01:00 (CET)
  - Summer (DST): UTC+02:00 (CEST)
- INSEE/Postal code: 40110 /40320
- ^{1} French Land Register data, which excludes lakes, ponds, glaciers > 1 km^{2} (0.386 sq mi or 247 acres) and river estuaries.

Geaune (French pronunciation: [ʒon]; Occitan: Gèuna) is a commune in the Landes department in Nouvelle-Aquitaine in southwestern France.

== Population ==
Historical population
Year	Pop.	±% p.a.
1968	599	—
1975	655	+1.28%
1982	697	+0.89%
1990	723	+0.46%
1999	660	−1.01%
2007	728	+1.23%
2012	730	+0.05%
2017	668	−1.76%
2023	767	+2.33%
Source: INSEE

== See also ==
- Communes of the Landes department
