= Audignon =

- Commune
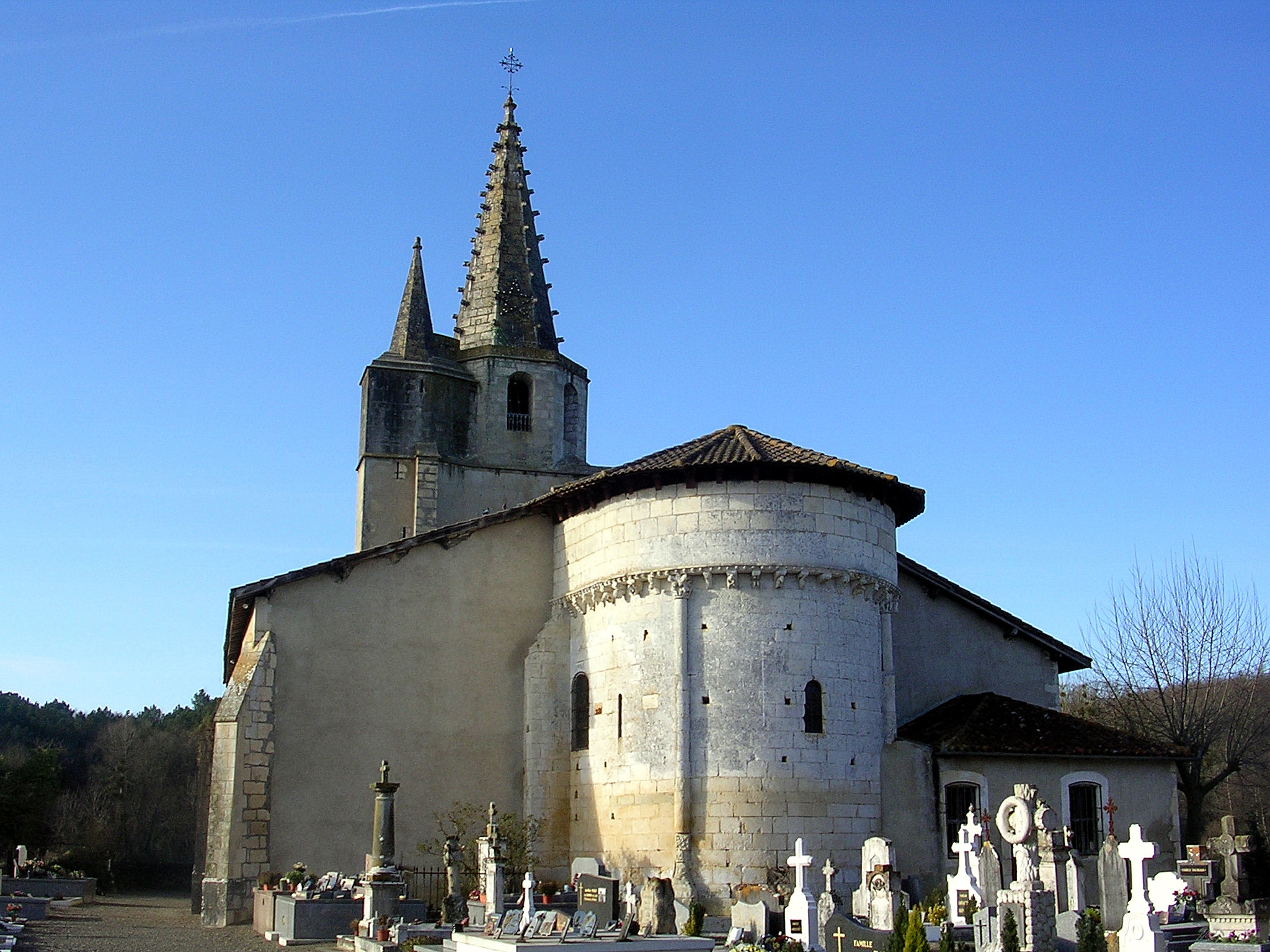
- The church of Audignon
- Location of Audignon
- Location within France Location within Nouvelle-Aquitaine
- Coordinates: 43°43′24″N 0°36′10″W
- Country: France
- Region: Nouvelle-Aquitaine
- Department: Landes
- Arrondissement: Mont-de-Marsan
- Canton: Chalosse Tursan
- Intercommunality: CC Chalosse Tursan

Government
  - Mayor (2020–2026): Marcel Pruet
- Area^{1}: 9.31 km^{2} (3.59 sq mi)
- Elevation: 50 m (160 ft)
- Highest elevation: 116 m (381 ft)
- Lowest elevation: 37 m (121 ft)
- Population (2023): 386
  - Density: 41.5/km^{2} (107/sq mi)
- Time zone: UTC+01:00 (CET)
  - Summer (DST): UTC+02:00 (CEST)
- INSEE/Postal code: 40017 /40500
- ^{1} French Land Register data, which excludes lakes, ponds, glaciers > 1 km^{2} (0.386 sq mi or 247 acres) and river estuaries.

Audignon (French pronunciation: [odiɲɔ̃]; Occitan: Audinhon) is a commune of the Landes department in Nouvelle-Aquitaine in southwestern France.

== Population ==
Historical population
Year	Pop.	±% p.a.
1968	333	—
1975	289	−2.00%
1982	294	+0.25%
1990	318	+0.99%
1999	328	+0.34%
2007	337	+0.34%
2012	386	+2.75%
2017	395	+0.46%
2023	386	−0.38%
Source: INSEE

== See also ==
- Communes of the Landes department
