= Cauna =

- Commune
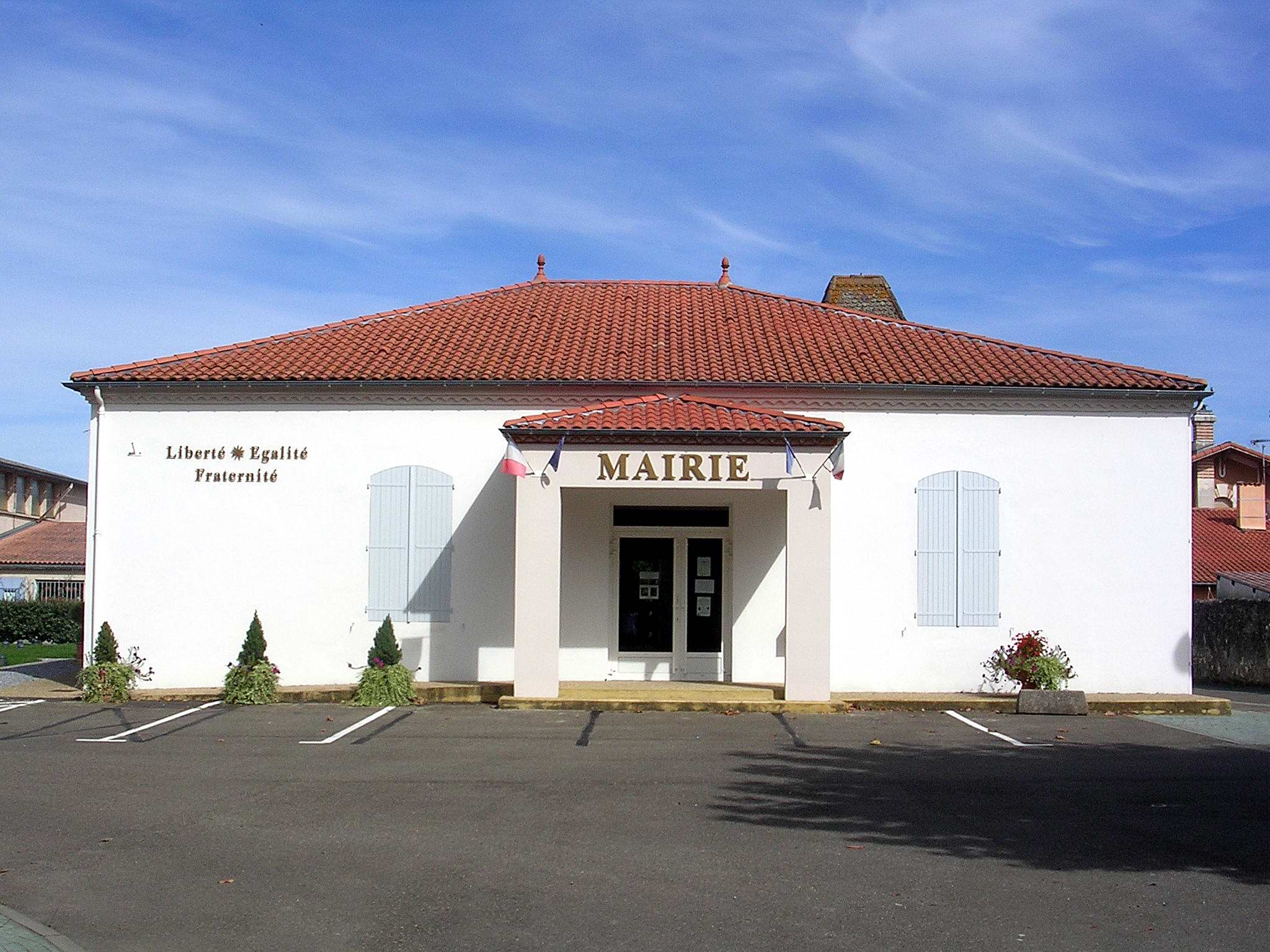
- Town hall
- Location of Cauna
- Location within France Location within Nouvelle-Aquitaine
- Coordinates: 43°46′57″N 0°38′17″W
- Country: France
- Region: Nouvelle-Aquitaine
- Department: Landes
- Arrondissement: Mont-de-Marsan
- Canton: Chalosse Tursan

Government
  - Mayor (2020–2026): Daniel Cardonne
- Area^{1}: 13.39 km^{2} (5.17 sq mi)
- Elevation: 45 m (148 ft)
- Highest elevation: 74 m (243 ft)
- Lowest elevation: 21 m (69 ft)
- Population (2023): 418
  - Density: 31.2/km^{2} (80.9/sq mi)
- Time zone: UTC+01:00 (CET)
  - Summer (DST): UTC+02:00 (CEST)
- INSEE/Postal code: 40076 /40500
- ^{1} French Land Register data, which excludes lakes, ponds, glaciers > 1 km^{2} (0.386 sq mi or 247 acres) and river estuaries.

Cauna (French pronunciation: [kona]; Occitan: Caunar) is a commune in the Landes department in Nouvelle-Aquitaine in southwestern France.

== Population ==
Historical population
Year	Pop.	±% p.a.
1968	406	—
1975	401	−0.18%
1982	390	−0.40%
1990	389	−0.03%
1999	389	+0.00%
2007	404	+0.47%
2012	439	+1.68%
2017	444	+0.23%
2023	418	−1.00%
Source: INSEE

== See also ==
- Communes of the Landes department
