= Saint-Loubouer =

- Commune
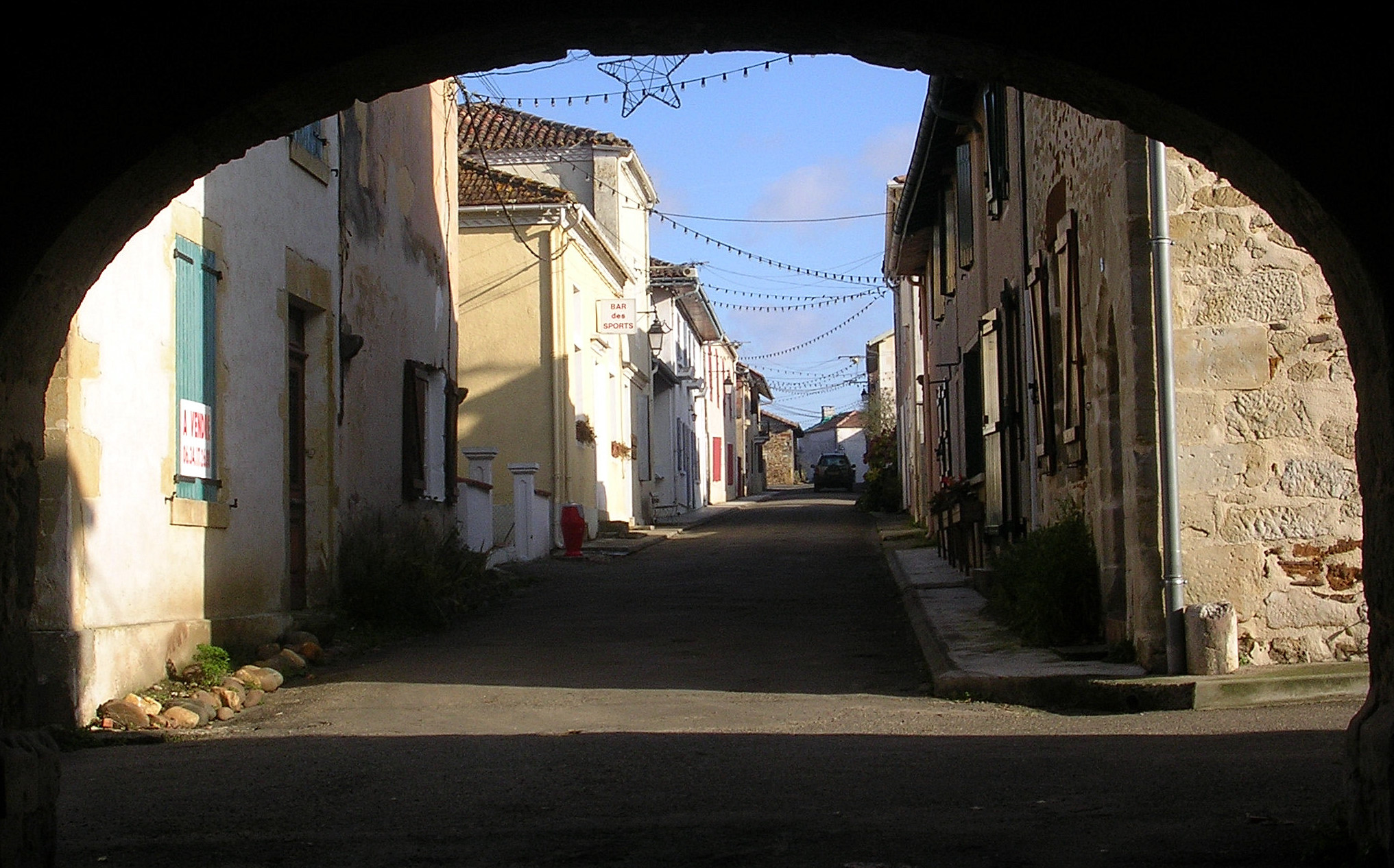
- Location of Saint-Loubouer
- Location within France Location within Nouvelle-Aquitaine
- Coordinates: 43°40′41″N 0°25′08″W
- Country: France
- Region: Nouvelle-Aquitaine
- Department: Landes
- Arrondissement: Mont-de-Marsan
- Canton: Adour Armagnac
- Intercommunality: Aire-sur-l'Adour

Government
  - Mayor (2020–2026): Jean-Jacques Dufau
- Area^{1}: 16.95 km^{2} (6.54 sq mi)
- Elevation: 155 m (509 ft)
- Highest elevation: 166 m (545 ft)
- Lowest elevation: 72 m (236 ft)
- Population (2023): 442
  - Density: 26.1/km^{2} (67.5/sq mi)
- Time zone: UTC+01:00 (CET)
  - Summer (DST): UTC+02:00 (CEST)
- INSEE/Postal code: 40270 /40320
- ^{1} French Land Register data, which excludes lakes, ponds, glaciers > 1 km^{2} (0.386 sq mi or 247 acres) and river estuaries.

Saint-Loubouer (French pronunciation: [sɛ̃ lubwe]; Gascon: Sent Loboèr) is a commune in the Landes department in Nouvelle-Aquitaine in southwestern France.

== Population ==
Historical population
Year	Pop.	±% p.a.
1968	456	—
1975	438	−0.57%
1982	425	−0.43%
1990	408	−0.51%
1999	410	+0.05%
2007	441	+0.92%
2012	437	−0.18%
2017	443	+0.27%
2023	442	−0.04%
Source: INSEE

== See also ==
- Communes of the Landes department
