= Tartas =

- Commune
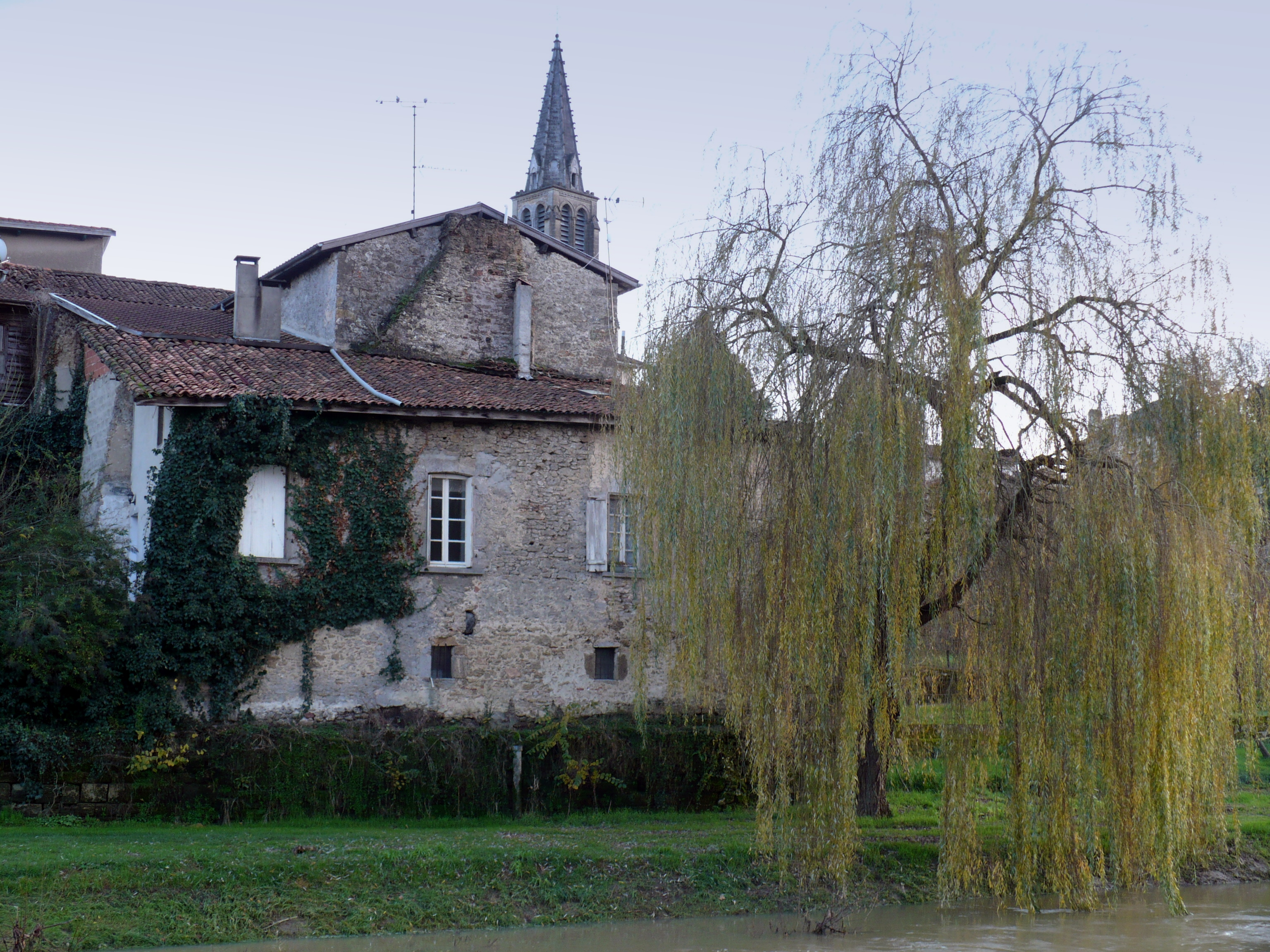

- Coat of arms
- Location of Tartas
- Location within France Location within Nouvelle-Aquitaine
- Coordinates: 43°50′01″N 0°48′27″W
- Country: France
- Region: Nouvelle-Aquitaine
- Department: Landes
- Arrondissement: Dax
- Canton: Pays morcenais tarusate
- Intercommunality: Pays Tarusate

Government
  - Mayor (2020–2026): Jean-François Broqueres
- Area^{1}: 30.37 km^{2} (11.73 sq mi)
- Elevation: 22 m (72 ft)
- Highest elevation: 68 m (223 ft)
- Lowest elevation: 10 m (33 ft)
- Population (2023): 3,169
  - Density: 104.3/km^{2} (270.3/sq mi)
- Time zone: UTC+01:00 (CET)
  - Summer (DST): UTC+02:00 (CEST)
- INSEE/Postal code: 40313 /40400
- ^{1} French Land Register data, which excludes lakes, ponds, glaciers > 1 km^{2} (0.386 sq mi or 247 acres) and river estuaries.

Tartas (French pronunciation: [taʁtas]; Occitan: Tartàs) is a commune in the Landes department in Nouvelle-Aquitaine in southwestern France.

== Population ==
Historical population

Year	Pop.	±% p.a.
1793	2,477	—
1821	2,648	+0.24%
1846	3,039	+0.55%
1872	2,991	−0.06%
1901	3,039	+0.05%
1926	2,641	−0.56%
1946	2,635	−0.01%
1962	2,950	+0.71%
1968	2,952	+0.01%

Year	Pop.	±% p.a.
1975	3,078	+0.60%
1982	2,958	−0.57%
1990	2,769	−0.82%
1999	2,844	+0.30%
2007	2,891	+0.21%
2012	3,182	+1.94%
2017	3,260	+0.49%
2023	3,169	−0.47%

Source: EHESS and INSEE (1968-2023)

== See also ==
- Communes of the Landes department
