= Eyres-Moncube =

- Commune
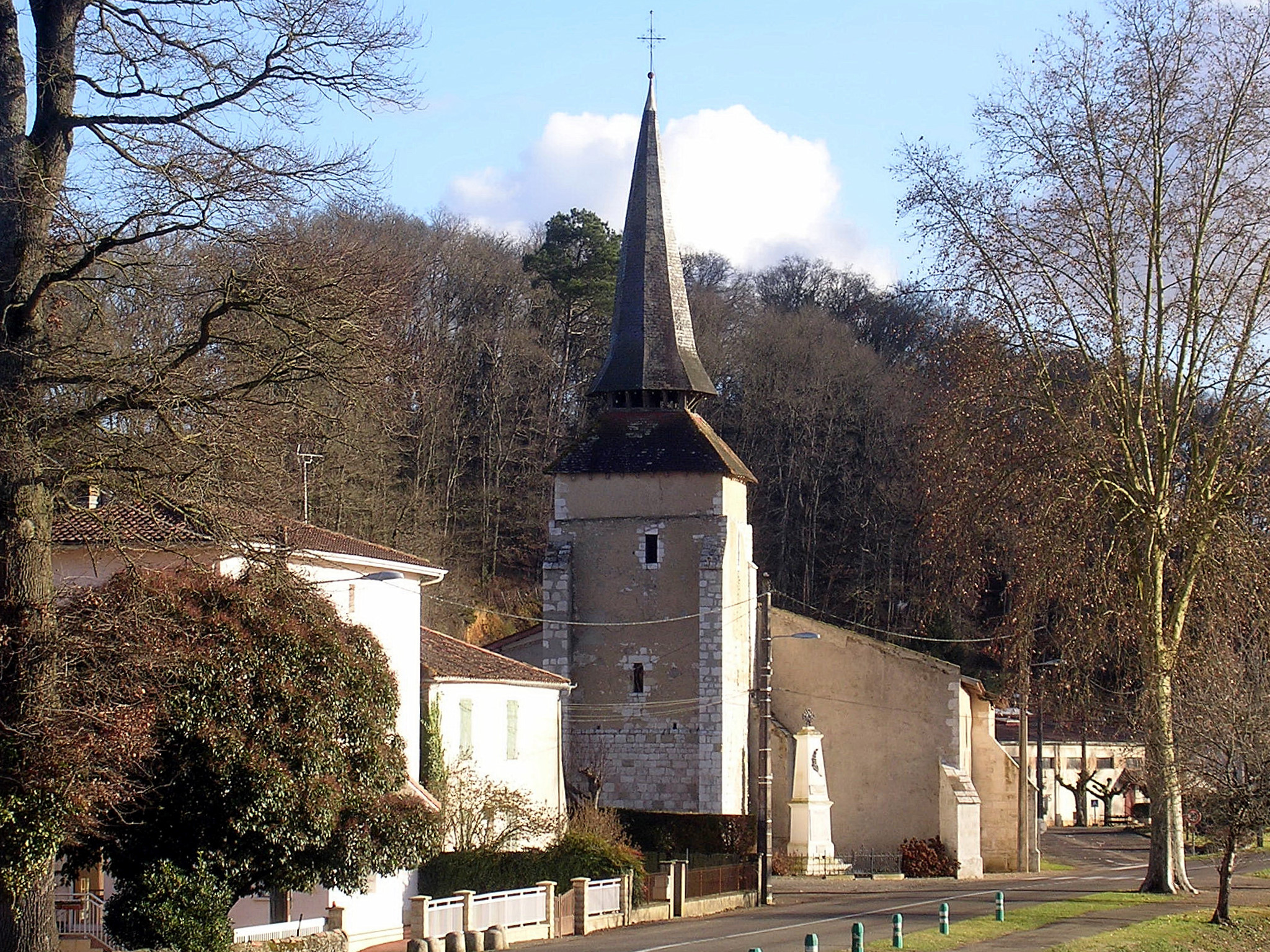
- Location of Eyres-Moncube
- Location within France Location within Nouvelle-Aquitaine
- Coordinates: 43°43′15″N 0°32′55″W
- Country: France
- Region: Nouvelle-Aquitaine
- Department: Landes
- Arrondissement: Mont-de-Marsan
- Canton: Chalosse Tursan

Government
  - Mayor (2020–2026): Bernard Labadie
- Area^{1}: 12.19 km^{2} (4.71 sq mi)
- Elevation: 40 m (130 ft)
- Highest elevation: 122 m (400 ft)
- Lowest elevation: 44 m (144 ft)
- Population (2023): 345
  - Density: 28.3/km^{2} (73.3/sq mi)
- Time zone: UTC+01:00 (CET)
  - Summer (DST): UTC+02:00 (CEST)
- INSEE/Postal code: 40098 /40500
- ^{1} French Land Register data, which excludes lakes, ponds, glaciers > 1 km^{2} (0.386 sq mi or 247 acres) and river estuaries.

Eyres-Moncube (French pronunciation: [ɛjʁ mɔ̃kyb]; Occitan: Èiras e Montcube) is a commune in the Landes department in Nouvelle-Aquitaine in southwestern France.

== Population ==
Historical population
Year	Pop.	±% p.a.
1968	386	—
1975	331	−2.17%
1982	301	−1.35%
1990	317	+0.65%
1999	342	+0.85%
2007	371	+1.02%
2012	374	+0.16%
2017	365	−0.49%
2023	345	−0.93%
Source: INSEE

== See also ==
- Communes of the Landes department
