= Adour =

River in southwestern France

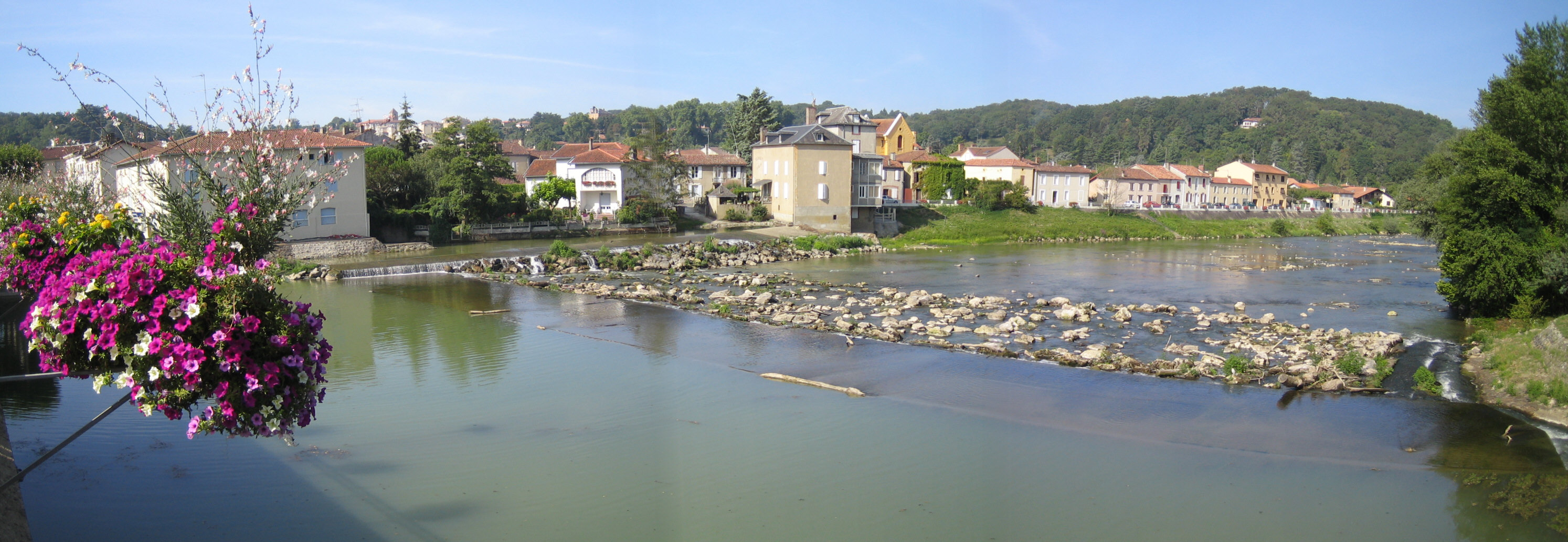
- Adour seen from the bridge at Aire-sur-l'Adour

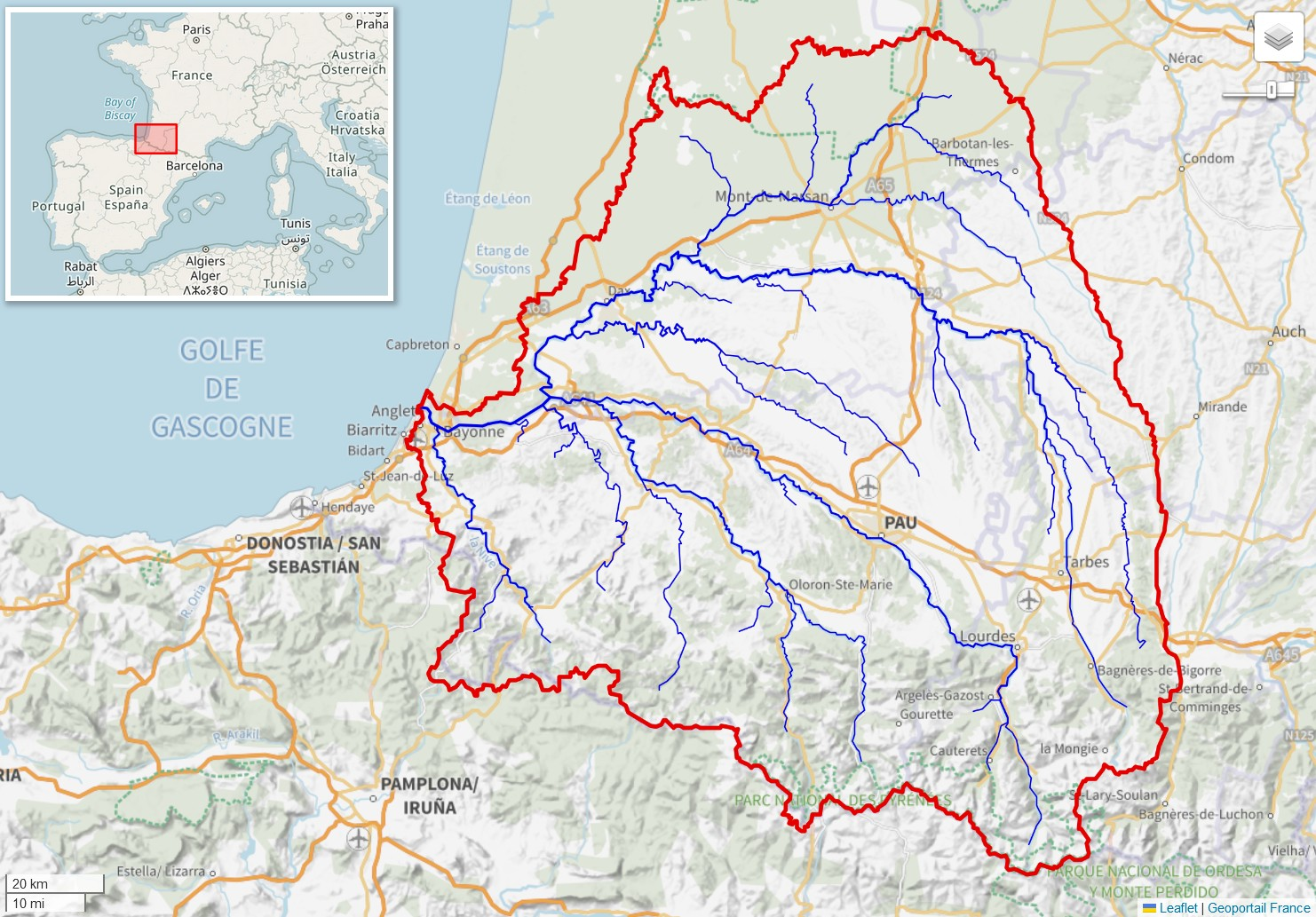
- Adour River watershed (Interactive map)
- Native name: L'Adour (French)

Location
- Country: France

Physical characteristics
- Source
  - location: High-Bigorre
  - elevation: 2,200 m (7,200 ft)
- Mouth
  - location: Atlantic Ocean
  - coordinates: 43°31′46″N 1°31′25″W
- Length: 308 km (191 mi)
- Basin size: 16,880 km^{2} (6,520 sq mi)
- Discharge
  - average: 150 m^{3}/s (5,300 cu ft/s)

The Adour (French pronunciation: [aduʁ]; Basque: Aturri; Occitan: Ador) is a river in southwestern France. It rises in High-Bigorre (Pyrenees), in the commune of Aspin-Aure, and flows into the Atlantic Ocean (Bay of Biscay) near Bayonne. It is 308.3 kilometres (191.6 mi) long, of which the uppermost ca. 11 kilometres (6.8 mi) is known as the Adour de Payolle. At its final stretch, i.e. on its way through Bayonne and a short extent upstream, the river draws the border between the Northern Basque Country and Landes regions.

== Places along the river ==
Départements and towns along the river include:

- Hautes-Pyrénées: Bagnères-de-Bigorre, Tarbes, Maubourguet
- Gers: Riscle
- Landes: Aire-sur-l'Adour, Dax, Tarnos
- Pyrénées-Atlantiques: Bayonne

== Tributaries ==
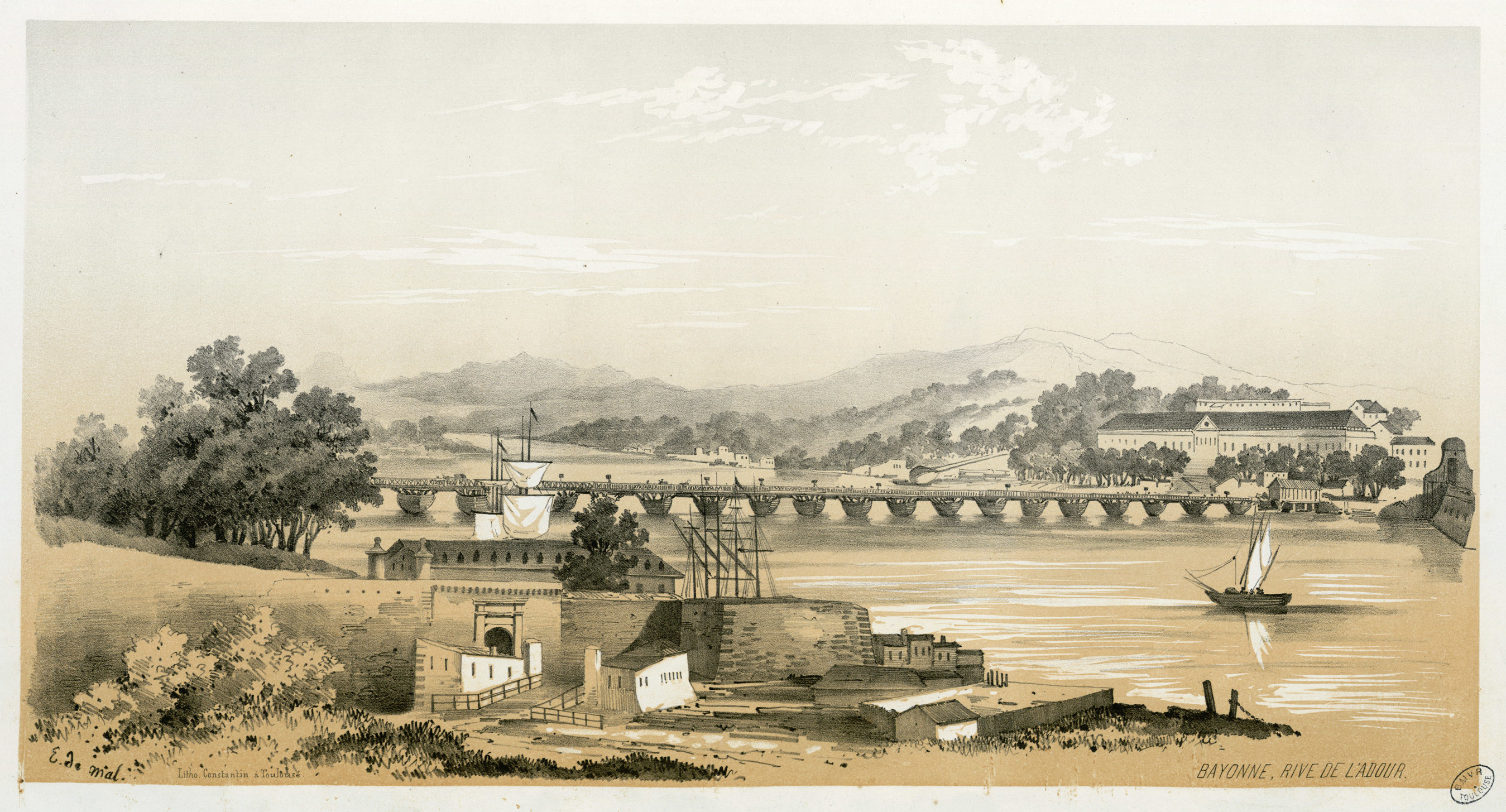
a scow on the Adour in Bayonne in 1843 by Eugène de Malbos.

The main tributaries of the Adour are, from source to mouth:

- Adour de Gripp (also Adour du Tourmalet, 15 km)
- Adour de Lesponne (19 km)
- Échez (64 km)
- Arros (130 km)
- Léez (56 km)
- Gabas (117 km)
- Midouze (151 km)
- Louts (86 km)
- Luy (154 km)
- Gave de Pau (191 km)
- Bidouze (82 km)
- Aran (48 km)
- Ardanabia (26 km)
- Nive (79 km)
