= Argelos =

Argelos is the name of two communes in France:

- Argelos, Landes, in the Landes department
- Argelos, Pyrénées-Atlantiques, in the Pyrénées-Atlantiques department
