= Hinx =

- Commune
- Location of Hinx
- Location within France Location within Nouvelle-Aquitaine
- Coordinates: 43°42′06″N 0°55′34″W
- Country: France
- Region: Nouvelle-Aquitaine
- Department: Landes
- Arrondissement: Dax
- Canton: Coteau de Chalosse

Government
  - Mayor (2020–2026): Hélène Tomas
- Area^{1}: 15.51 km^{2} (5.99 sq mi)
- Elevation: 42 m (138 ft)
- Highest elevation: 55 m (180 ft)
- Lowest elevation: 3 m (9.8 ft)
- Population (2023): 1,894
  - Density: 122.1/km^{2} (316.3/sq mi)
- Time zone: UTC+01:00 (CET)
  - Summer (DST): UTC+02:00 (CEST)
- INSEE/Postal code: 40126 /40180
- ^{1} French Land Register data, which excludes lakes, ponds, glaciers > 1 km^{2} (0.386 sq mi or 247 acres) and river estuaries.

Hinx (French pronunciation: [ɛ̃ks]; Occitan: Hins) is a commune in the Landes department in Nouvelle-Aquitaine in southwestern France.

== Population ==
Historical population
Year	Pop.	±% p.a.
1968	756	—
1975	824	+1.24%
1982	994	+2.72%
1990	1,117	+1.47%
1999	1,145	+0.28%
2007	1,372	+2.29%
2012	1,849	+6.15%
2017	1,883	+0.37%
2023	1,894	+0.10%
Source: INSEE

== See also ==
- Communes of the Landes department
