= Nerbis =

- Commune
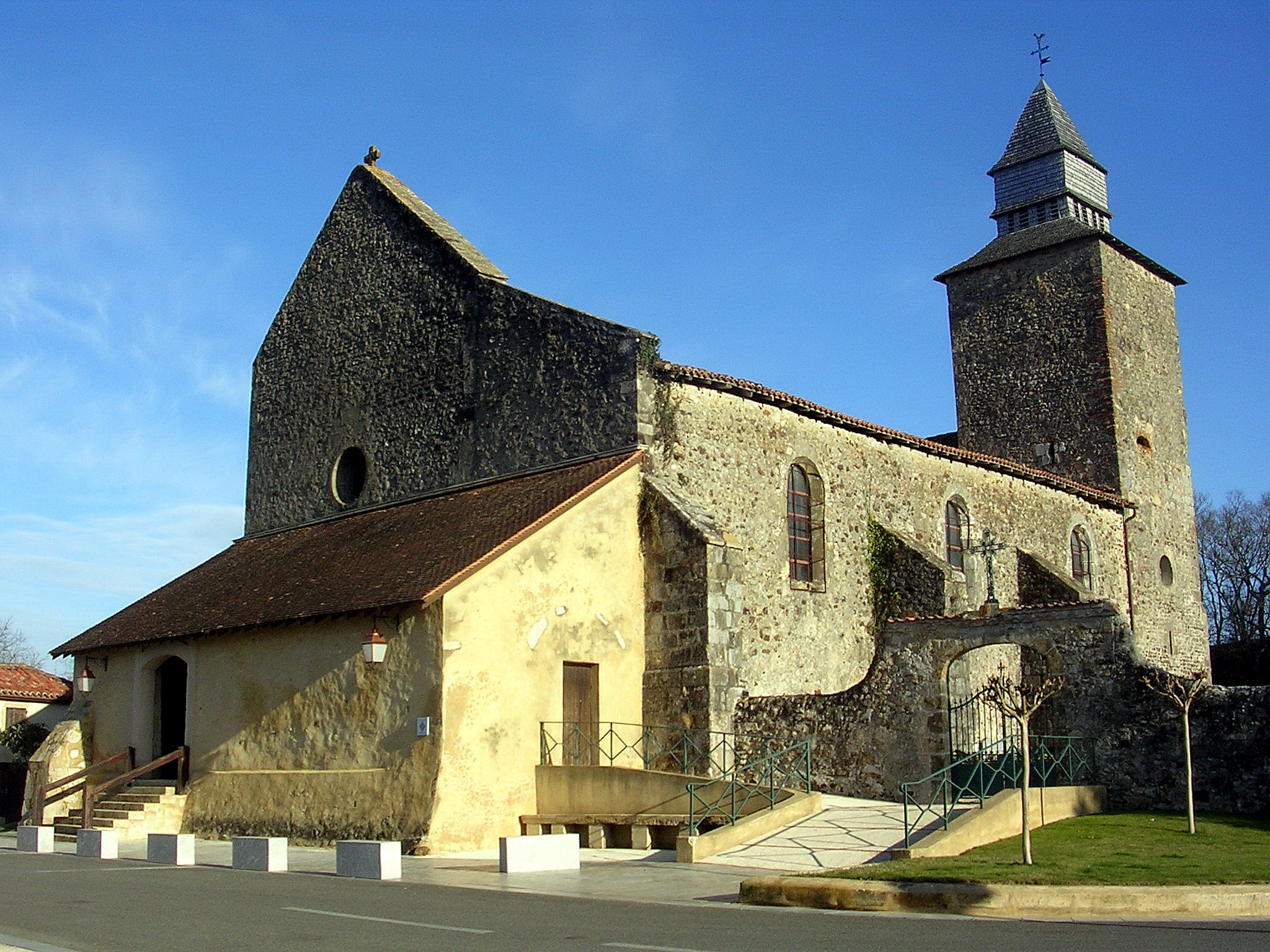
- Location of Nerbis
- Location within France Location within Nouvelle-Aquitaine
- Coordinates: 43°45′21″N 0°44′06″W
- Country: France
- Region: Nouvelle-Aquitaine
- Department: Landes
- Arrondissement: Dax
- Canton: Coteau de Chalosse
- Intercommunality: Terres de Chalosse

Government
  - Mayor (2023–2026): Eric Degos
- Area^{1}: 4.15 km^{2} (1.60 sq mi)
- Elevation: 110 m (360 ft)
- Highest elevation: 103 m (338 ft)
- Lowest elevation: 16 m (52 ft)
- Population (2023): 267
  - Density: 64.3/km^{2} (167/sq mi)
- Time zone: UTC+01:00 (CET)
  - Summer (DST): UTC+02:00 (CEST)
- INSEE/Postal code: 40204 /40250
- ^{1} French Land Register data, which excludes lakes, ponds, glaciers > 1 km^{2} (0.386 sq mi or 247 acres) and river estuaries.

Nerbis is a commune in the Landes department in Nouvelle-Aquitaine in southwestern France.

== Population ==
Historical population
Year	Pop.	±% p.a.
1968	201	—
1975	199	−0.14%
1982	213	+0.98%
1990	256	+2.33%
1999	251	−0.22%
2007	240	−0.56%
2012	271	+2.46%
2017	273	+0.15%
2023	267	−0.37%
Source: INSEE

== See also ==
- Communes of the Landes department
