= Hauriet =

- Commune
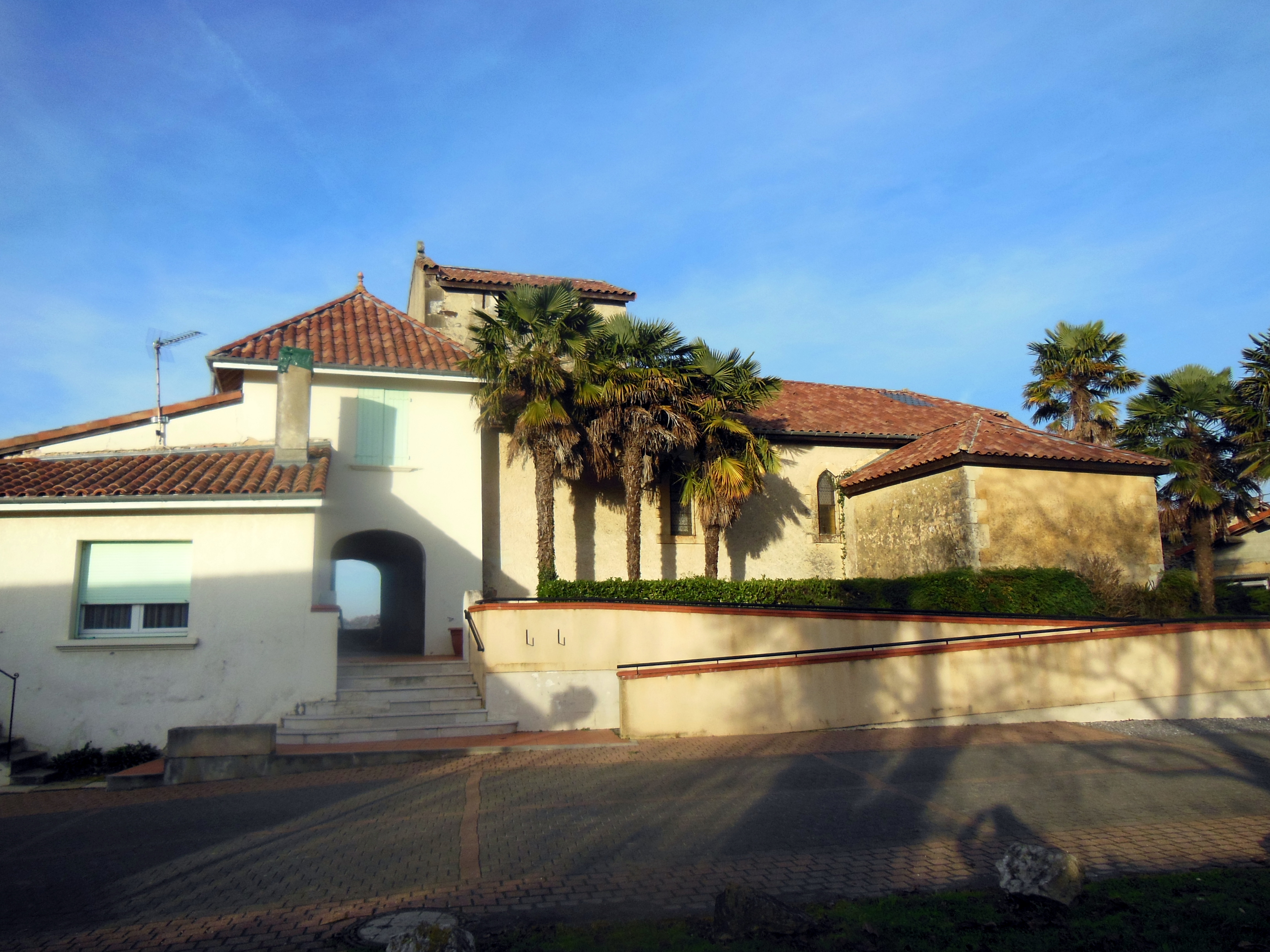
- Location of Hauriet
- Location within France Location within Nouvelle-Aquitaine
- Coordinates: 43°44′01″N 0°41′47″W
- Country: France
- Region: Nouvelle-Aquitaine
- Department: Landes
- Arrondissement: Dax
- Canton: Coteau de Chalosse
- Intercommunality: Terres de Chalosse

Government
  - Mayor (2020–2026): Patrick Man
- Area^{1}: 7.57 km^{2} (2.92 sq mi)
- Elevation: 94 m (308 ft)
- Highest elevation: 106 m (348 ft)
- Lowest elevation: 24 m (79 ft)
- Population (2023): 271
  - Density: 35.8/km^{2} (92.7/sq mi)
- Time zone: UTC+01:00 (CET)
  - Summer (DST): UTC+02:00 (CEST)
- INSEE/Postal code: 40121 /40250
- ^{1} French Land Register data, which excludes lakes, ponds, glaciers > 1 km^{2} (0.386 sq mi or 247 acres) and river estuaries.

Hauriet is a commune in the Landes department in Nouvelle-Aquitaine in southwestern France.

== Population ==
Historical population
Year	Pop.	±% p.a.
1968	317	—
1975	285	−1.51%
1982	267	−0.93%
1990	240	−1.32%
1999	251	+0.50%
2007	242	−0.46%
2012	270	+2.21%
2017	278	+0.59%
2023	271	−0.42%
Source: INSEE

== See also ==
- Communes of the Landes department
