= Larbey =

- Commune
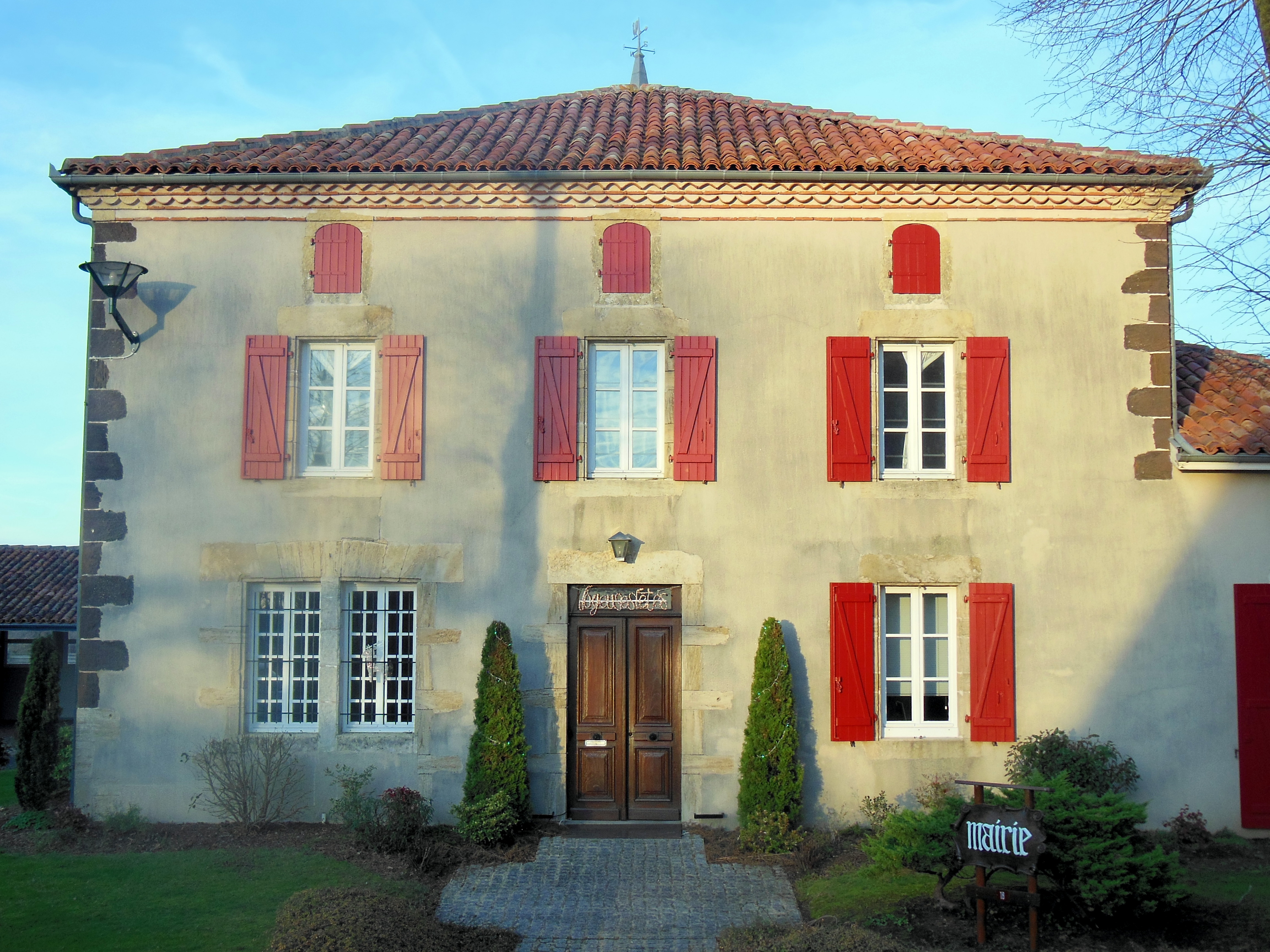
- The town hall in Larbey
- Location of Larbey
- Location within France Location within Nouvelle-Aquitaine
- Coordinates: 43°42′15″N 0°43′01″W
- Country: France
- Region: Nouvelle-Aquitaine
- Department: Landes
- Arrondissement: Dax
- Canton: Coteau de Chalosse
- Intercommunality: Terres de Chalosse

Government
  - Mayor (2020–2026): Michel Dangoumau
- Area^{1}: 6 km^{2} (2.3 sq mi)
- Elevation: 101 m (331 ft)
- Highest elevation: 108 m (354 ft)
- Lowest elevation: 33 m (108 ft)
- Population (2023): 237
  - Density: 39/km^{2} (100/sq mi)
- Time zone: UTC+01:00 (CET)
  - Summer (DST): UTC+02:00 (CEST)
- INSEE/Postal code: 40144 /40250
- ^{1} French Land Register data, which excludes lakes, ponds, glaciers > 1 km^{2} (0.386 sq mi or 247 acres) and river estuaries.

Larbey (French pronunciation: [laʁbɛ]; Occitan: Larbei) is a commune in the Landes department in Nouvelle-Aquitaine in southwestern France.

== See also ==
- Communes of the Landes department
