= Poyartin =

- Commune
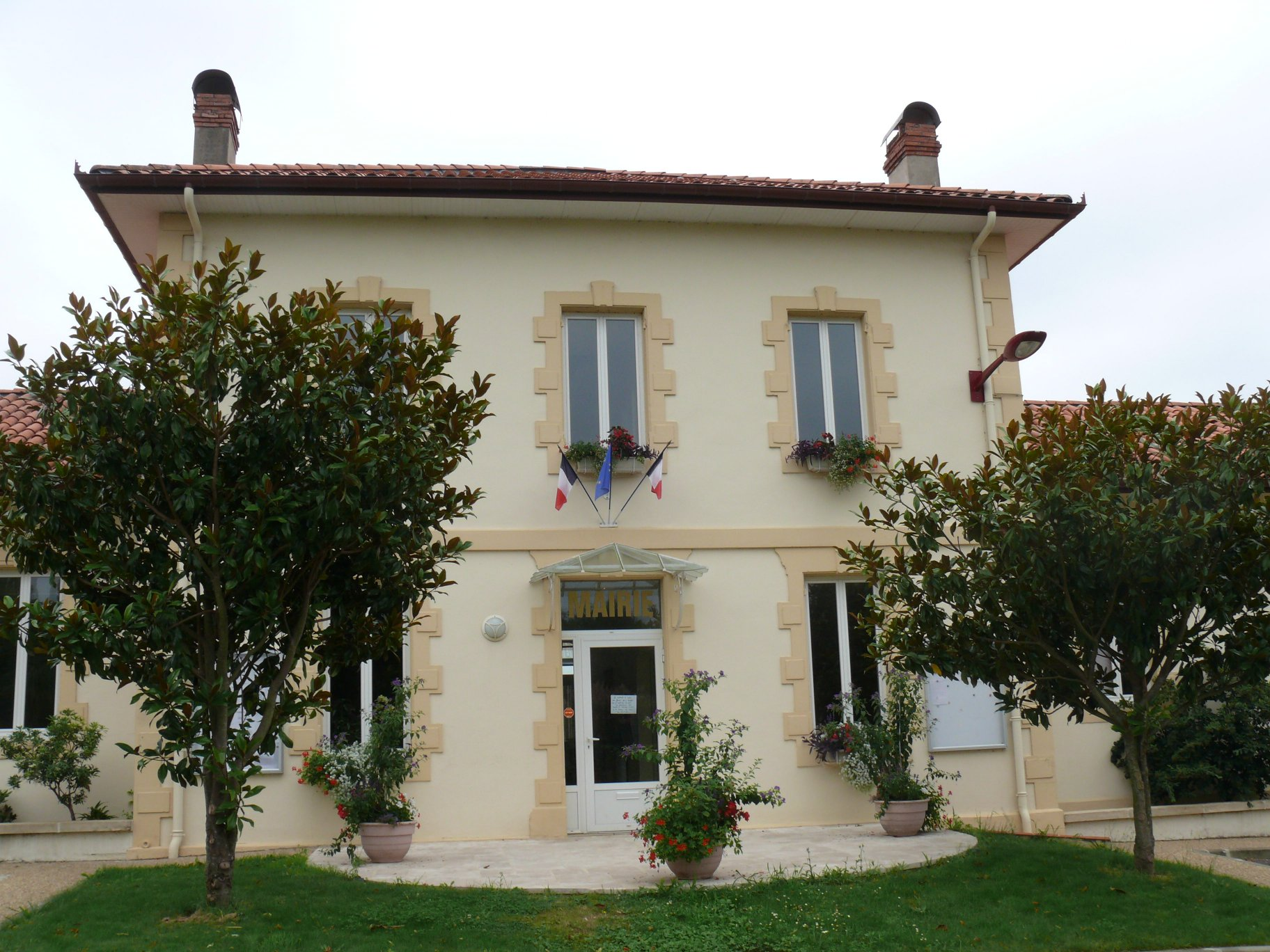
- Town hall
- Location of Poyartin
- Location within France Location within Nouvelle-Aquitaine
- Coordinates: 43°41′10″N 0°51′58″W
- Country: France
- Region: Nouvelle-Aquitaine
- Department: Landes
- Arrondissement: Dax
- Canton: Coteau de Chalosse
- Intercommunality: Terres de Chalosse

Government
  - Mayor (2020–2026): Thierry Dartiguelongue
- Area^{1}: 13.04 km^{2} (5.03 sq mi)
- Elevation: 28 m (92 ft)
- Highest elevation: 102 m (335 ft)
- Lowest elevation: 17 m (56 ft)
- Population (2023): 776
  - Density: 59.5/km^{2} (154/sq mi)
- Time zone: UTC+01:00 (CET)
  - Summer (DST): UTC+02:00 (CEST)
- INSEE/Postal code: 40236 /40380
- ^{1} French Land Register data, which excludes lakes, ponds, glaciers > 1 km^{2} (0.386 sq mi or 247 acres) and river estuaries.

Poyartin (French pronunciation: [pɔjaʁtɛ̃]; Occitan: Poiartin) is a commune in the Landes department in Nouvelle-Aquitaine in southwestern France.

== Population ==
Historical population
Year	Pop.	±% p.a.
1968	623	—
1975	629	+0.14%
1982	631	+0.05%
1990	648	+0.33%
1999	631	−0.29%
2007	670	+0.75%
2012	779	+3.06%
2017	833	+1.35%
2023	776	−1.17%
Source: INSEE

== See also ==
- Communes of the Landes department
