= Saint-Aubin, Landes =

Saint-Aubin
- Commune
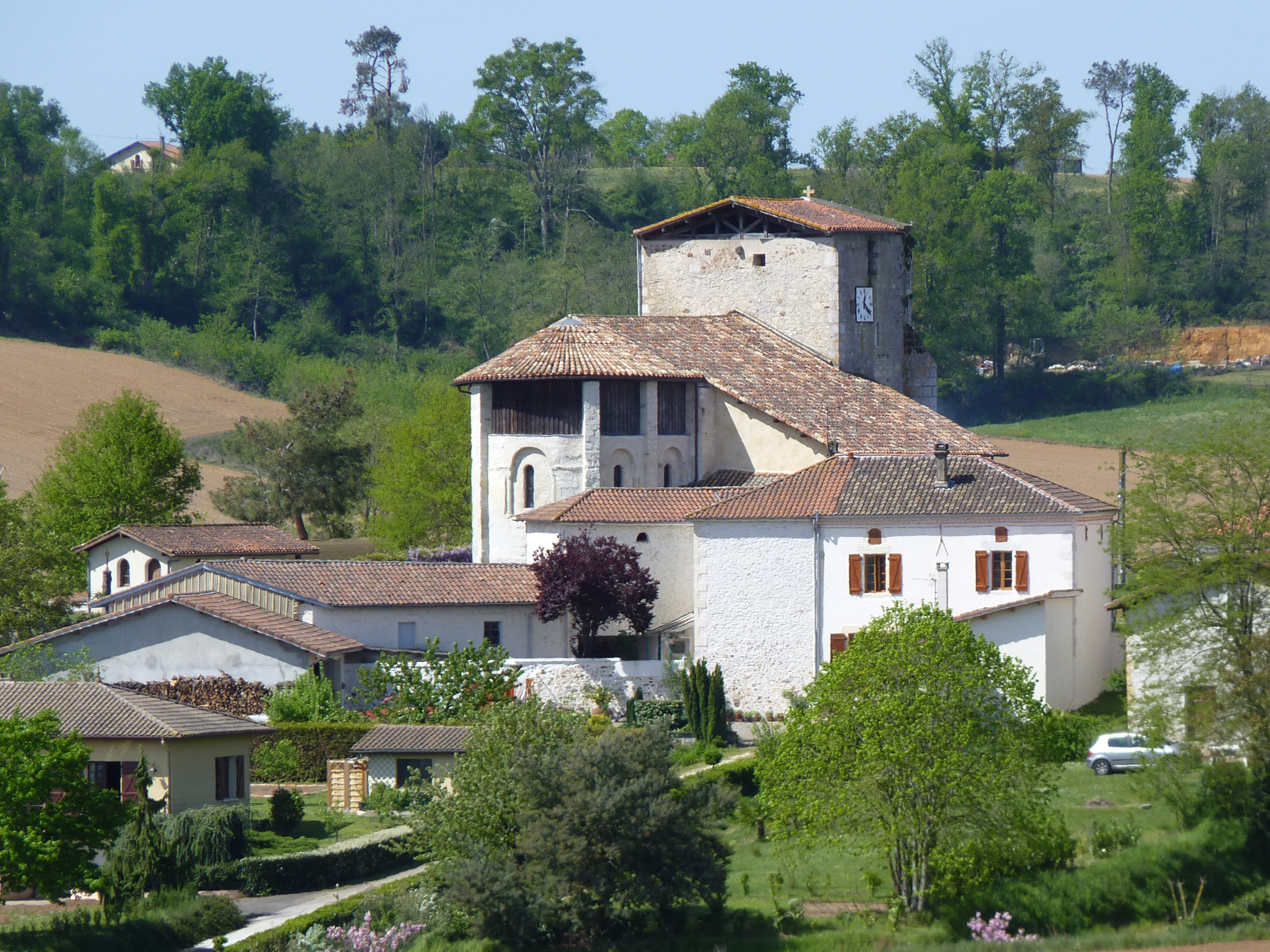
- Location of Saint-Aubin
- Location within France Location within Nouvelle-Aquitaine
- Coordinates: 43°42′43″N 0°41′45″W
- Country: France
- Region: Nouvelle-Aquitaine
- Department: Landes
- Arrondissement: Dax
- Canton: Coteau de Chalosse

Government
  - Mayor (2020–2026): Francis Crabos
- Area^{1}: 9.72 km^{2} (3.75 sq mi)
- Elevation: 50 m (160 ft)
- Highest elevation: 107 m (351 ft)
- Lowest elevation: 32 m (105 ft)
- Population (2023): 498
  - Density: 51.2/km^{2} (133/sq mi)
- Time zone: UTC+01:00 (CET)
  - Summer (DST): UTC+02:00 (CEST)
- INSEE/Postal code: 40249 /40250
- ^{1} French Land Register data, which excludes lakes, ponds, glaciers > 1 km^{2} (0.386 sq mi or 247 acres) and river estuaries.

Saint-Aubin (French pronunciation: [sɛ̃.t‿obɛ̃]; Occitan: Sent Aubin) is a commune in the Landes department in Nouvelle-Aquitaine in southwestern France.

== Population ==
Historical population
Year	Pop.	±% p.a.
1968	458	—
1975	453	−0.16%
1982	450	−0.09%
1990	452	+0.06%
1999	457	+0.12%
2007	484	+0.72%
2012	508	+0.97%
2017	503	−0.20%
2023	498	−0.17%
Source: INSEE

== See also ==
- Communes of the Landes department
- Château de Poyaller
