= Gousse =

- Commune
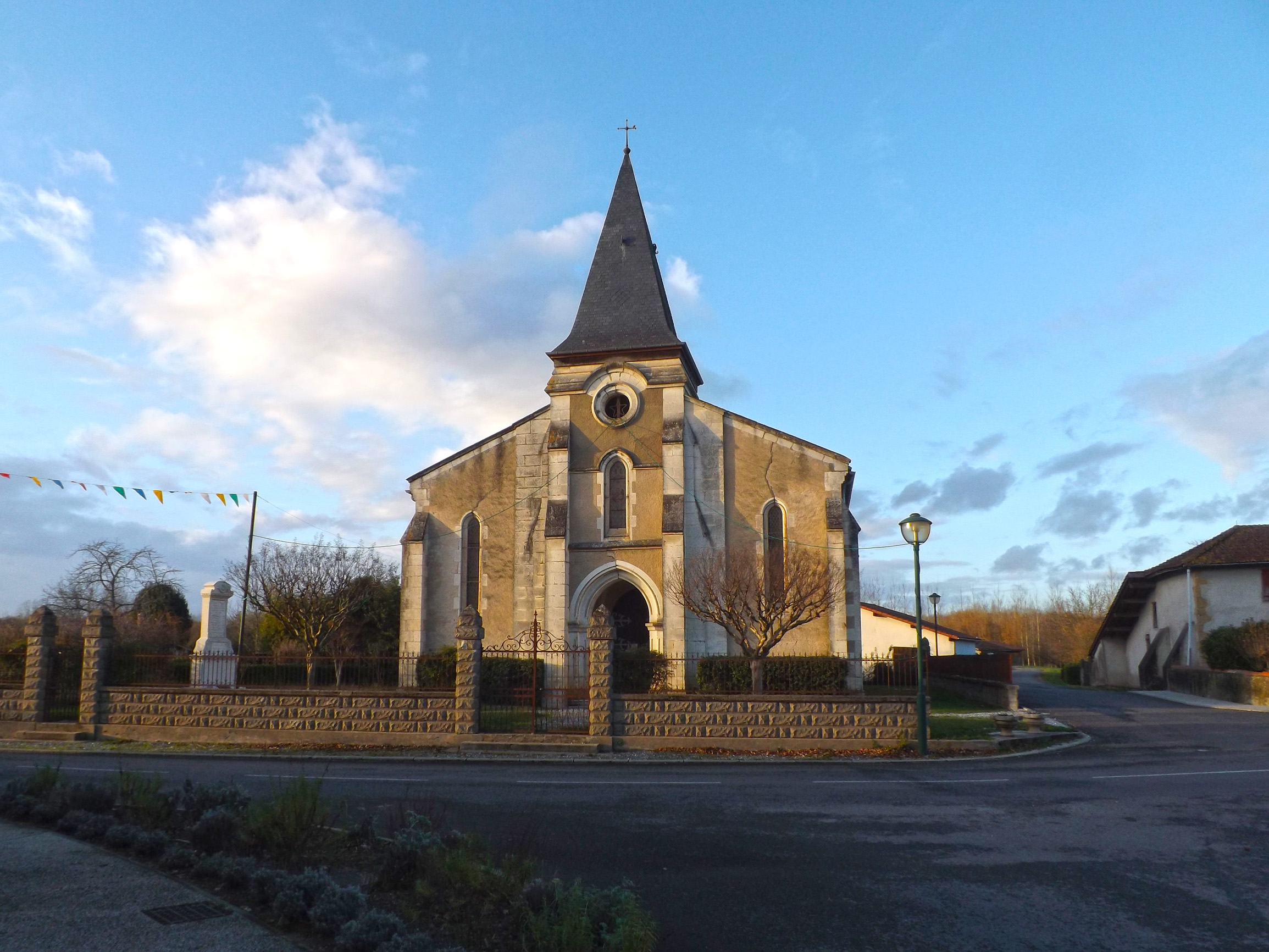
- Location of Gousse
- Location within France Location within Nouvelle-Aquitaine
- Coordinates: 43°46′26″N 0°53′44″W
- Country: France
- Region: Nouvelle-Aquitaine
- Department: Landes
- Arrondissement: Dax
- Canton: Coteau de Chalosse

Government
  - Mayor (2020–2026): Fabrice Laurede
- Area^{1}: 4.09 km^{2} (1.58 sq mi)
- Elevation: 15 m (49 ft)
- Highest elevation: 34 m (112 ft)
- Lowest elevation: 6 m (20 ft)
- Population (2023): 275
  - Density: 67.2/km^{2} (174/sq mi)
- Time zone: UTC+01:00 (CET)
  - Summer (DST): UTC+02:00 (CEST)
- INSEE/Postal code: 40115 /40465
- ^{1} French Land Register data, which excludes lakes, ponds, glaciers > 1 km^{2} (0.386 sq mi or 247 acres) and river estuaries.

Gousse (French pronunciation: [ɡus]; Occitan: Gossa) is a commune in the Landes department in Nouvelle-Aquitaine in southwestern France.

== Population ==
Historical population
Year	Pop.	±% p.a.
1968	163	—
1975	143	−1.85%
1982	140	−0.30%
1990	137	−0.27%
1999	170	+2.43%
2007	248	+4.83%
2012	316	+4.97%
2017	312	−0.25%
2023	275	−2.08%
Source: INSEE

== See also ==
- Communes of the Landes department
