= Clermont, Landes =

Clermont
- Commune
- Location of Clermont
- Location within France Location within Nouvelle-Aquitaine
- Coordinates: 43°39′10″N 0°54′55″W
- Country: France
- Region: Nouvelle-Aquitaine
- Department: Landes
- Arrondissement: Dax
- Canton: Coteau de Chalosse
- Intercommunality: Terres de Chalosse

Government
  - Mayor (2020–2026): Benoît Vidal
- Area^{1}: 15.02 km^{2} (5.80 sq mi)
- Elevation: 50 m (160 ft)
- Highest elevation: 59 m (194 ft)
- Lowest elevation: 9 m (30 ft)
- Population (2023): 736
  - Density: 49.0/km^{2} (127/sq mi)
- Time zone: UTC+01:00 (CET)
  - Summer (DST): UTC+02:00 (CEST)
- INSEE/Postal code: 40084 /40180
- ^{1} French Land Register data, which excludes lakes, ponds, glaciers > 1 km^{2} (0.386 sq mi or 247 acres) and river estuaries.

Clermont (French pronunciation: [klɛʁmɔ̃]; Occitan: Clarmont) is a commune in the Landes department in Nouvelle-Aquitaine in southwestern France.

== Population ==
Historical population
Year	Pop.	±% p.a.
1968	485	—
1975	508	+0.66%
1982	553	+1.22%
1990	594	+0.90%
1999	646	+0.94%
2007	842	+3.37%
2012	797	−1.09%
2017	773	−0.61%
2023	736	−0.81%
Source: INSEE

== See also ==
- Communes of the Landes department
