= Arsague =

- Commune
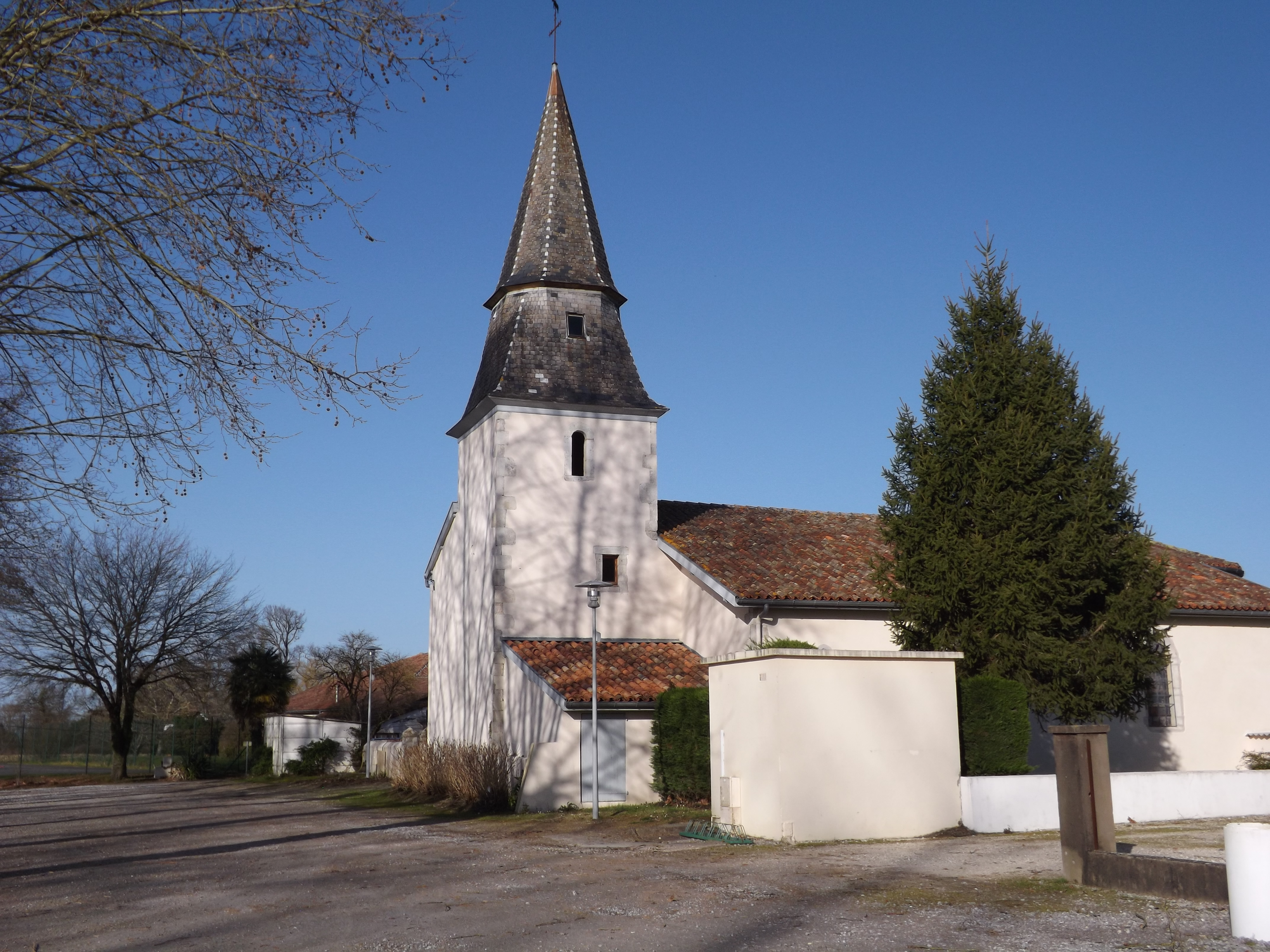
- The church of Arsague
- Location of Arsague
- Location within France Location within Nouvelle-Aquitaine
- Coordinates: 43°34′52″N 0°47′42″W
- Country: France
- Region: Nouvelle-Aquitaine
- Department: Landes
- Arrondissement: Dax
- Canton: Coteau de Chalosse
- Intercommunality: CC Coteaux Vallées Luys

Government
  - Mayor (2020–2026): Jean-Yves Haurat
- Area^{1}: 7.18 km^{2} (2.77 sq mi)
- Elevation: 70 m (230 ft)
- Highest elevation: 94 m (308 ft)
- Lowest elevation: 46 m (151 ft)
- Population (2023): 348
  - Density: 48.5/km^{2} (126/sq mi)
- Time zone: UTC+01:00 (CET)
  - Summer (DST): UTC+02:00 (CEST)
- INSEE/Postal code: 40011 /40330
- ^{1} French Land Register data, which excludes lakes, ponds, glaciers > 1 km^{2} (0.386 sq mi or 247 acres) and river estuaries.

Arsague (French pronunciation: [aʁsaɡ]) is a commune of the Landes department in Nouvelle-Aquitaine in southwestern France.

== Population ==
Historical population
Year	Pop.	±% p.a.
1968	383	—
1975	339	−1.73%
1982	289	−2.25%
1990	307	+0.76%
1999	277	−1.14%
2007	302	+1.09%
2012	368	+4.03%
2017	340	−1.57%
2023	348	+0.39%
Source: INSEE

== See also ==
- Communes of the Landes department
