= Gamarde-les-Bains =

- Commune
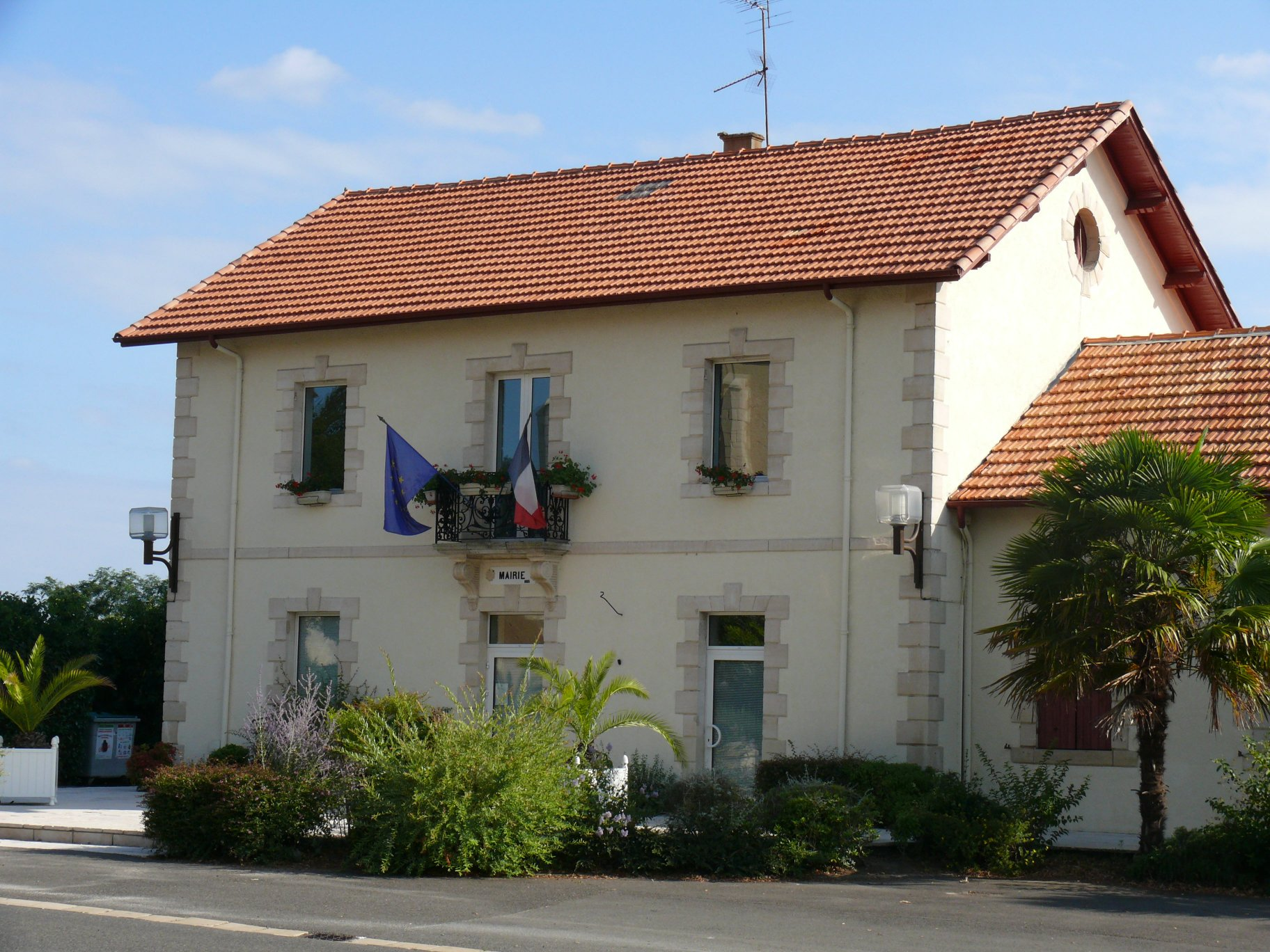
- Town hall
- Location of Gamarde-les-Bains
- Location within France Location within Nouvelle-Aquitaine
- Coordinates: 43°44′01″N 0°52′19″W
- Country: France
- Region: Nouvelle-Aquitaine
- Department: Landes
- Arrondissement: Dax
- Canton: Coteau de Chalosse
- Intercommunality: Terres de Chalosse

Government
  - Mayor (2020–2026): Jérôme Curutchet
- Area^{1}: 18.95 km^{2} (7.32 sq mi)
- Elevation: 90 m (300 ft)
- Highest elevation: 97 m (318 ft)
- Lowest elevation: 9 m (30 ft)
- Population (2023): 1,583
  - Density: 83.54/km^{2} (216.4/sq mi)
- Time zone: UTC+01:00 (CET)
  - Summer (DST): UTC+02:00 (CEST)
- INSEE/Postal code: 40104 /40380
- ^{1} French Land Register data, which excludes lakes, ponds, glaciers > 1 km^{2} (0.386 sq mi or 247 acres) and river estuaries.

Gamarde-les-Bains (French pronunciation: [ɡamaʁd le bɛ̃]; Occitan: Gamarde) is a commune in the Landes department in Nouvelle-Aquitaine in southwestern France.

== Population ==
Historical population
Year	Pop.	±% p.a.
1968	877	—
1975	781	−1.64%
1982	780	−0.02%
1990	857	+1.18%
1999	883	+0.33%
2007	993	+1.48%
2012	1,127	+2.56%
2017	1,319	+3.20%
2023	1,583	+3.09%
Source: INSEE

== See also ==
- Communes of the Landes department
