= Baigts =

- Commune
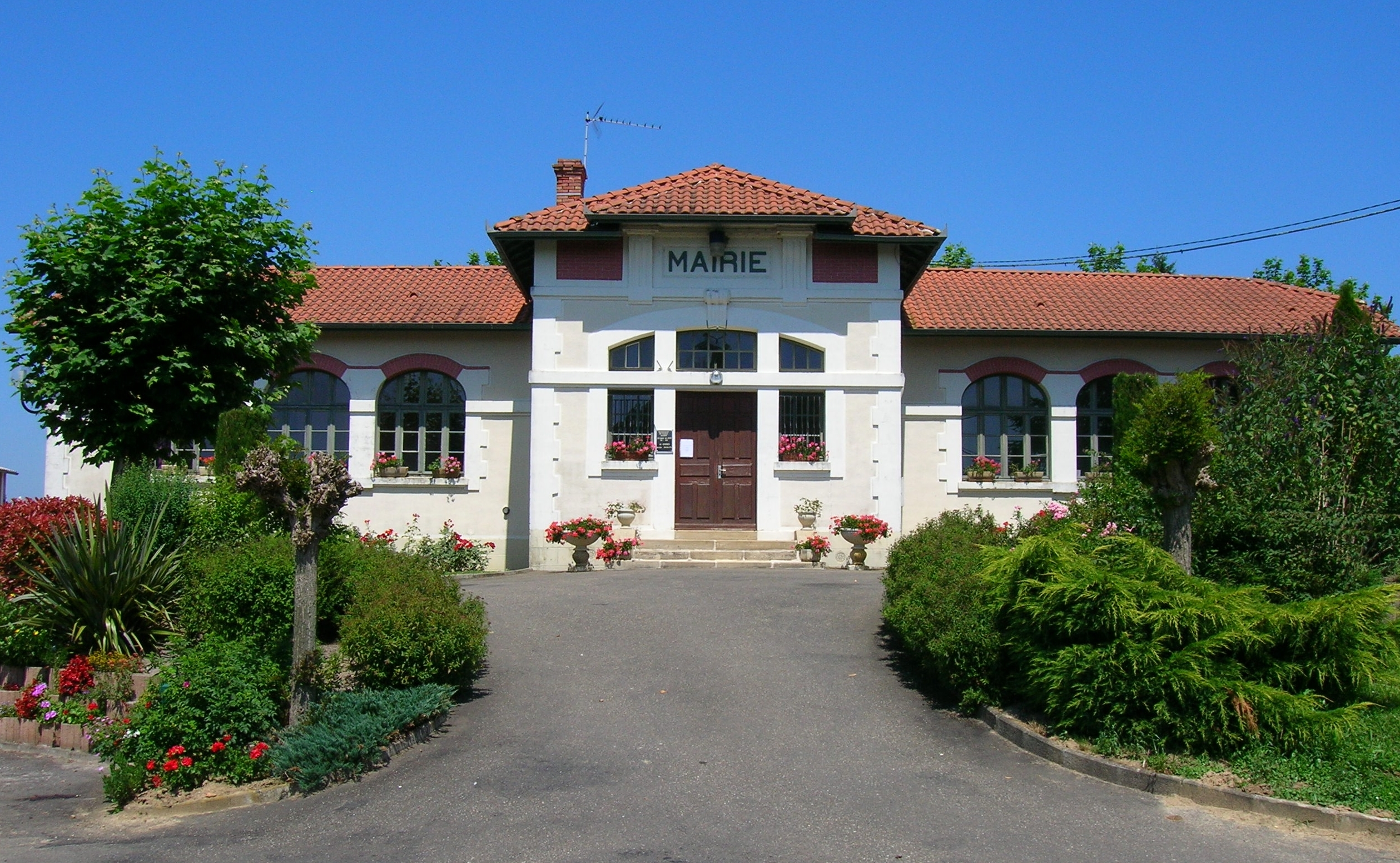
- Town hall
- Location of Baigts
- Location within France Location within Nouvelle-Aquitaine
- Coordinates: 43°41′14″N 0°47′25″W
- Country: France
- Region: Nouvelle-Aquitaine
- Department: Landes
- Arrondissement: Dax
- Canton: Coteau de Chalosse
- Intercommunality: Terres de Chalosse

Government
  - Mayor (2020–2026): Francis Dubecq
- Area^{1}: 11.64 km^{2} (4.49 sq mi)
- Highest elevation: 122 m (400 ft)
- Lowest elevation: 32 m (105 ft)
- Population (2023): 331
  - Density: 28.4/km^{2} (73.7/sq mi)
- Time zone: UTC+01:00 (CET)
  - Summer (DST): UTC+02:00 (CEST)
- INSEE/Postal code: 40023 /40380
- ^{1} French Land Register data, which excludes lakes, ponds, glaciers > 1 km^{2} (0.386 sq mi or 247 acres) and river estuaries.

Baigts (French pronunciation: [batʃ]; Occitan: Vaths) is a commune in the Landes department in Nouvelle-Aquitaine in southwestern France.

== Population ==
Historical population
Year	Pop.	±% p.a.
1968	407	—
1975	400	−0.25%
1982	354	−1.73%
1990	350	−0.14%
1999	322	−0.92%
2007	345	+0.87%
2012	346	+0.06%
2017	364	+1.02%
2023	331	−1.57%
Source: INSEE

== See also ==
- Communes of the Landes department
