= Nassiet =

- Commune
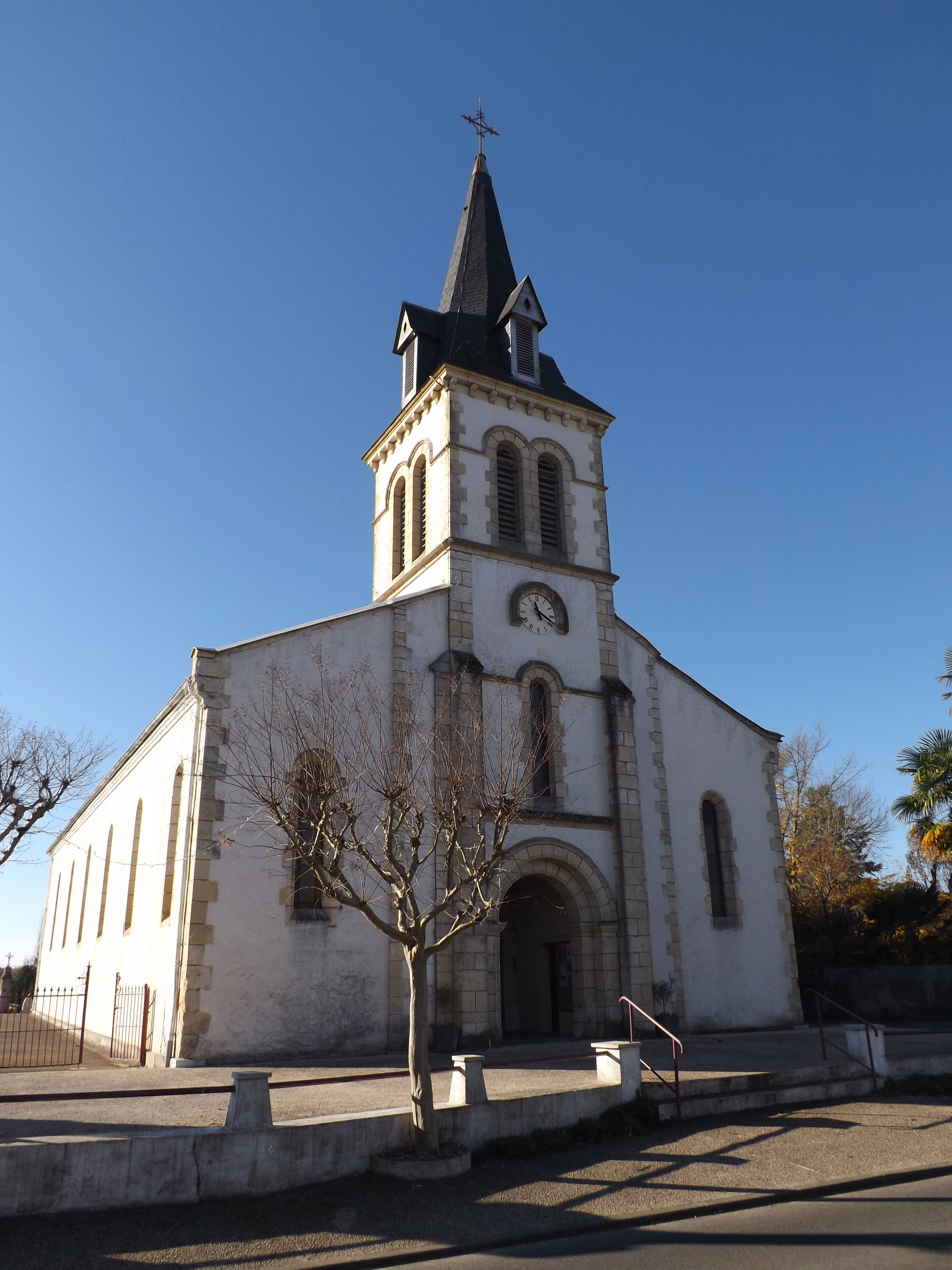
- Location of Nassiet
- Location within France Location within Nouvelle-Aquitaine
- Coordinates: 43°36′03″N 0°40′38″W
- Country: France
- Region: Nouvelle-Aquitaine
- Department: Landes
- Arrondissement: Dax
- Canton: Coteau de Chalosse

Government
  - Mayor (2020–2026): Karine Lapos
- Area^{1}: 11.77 km^{2} (4.54 sq mi)
- Elevation: 122 m (400 ft)
- Highest elevation: 145 m (476 ft)
- Lowest elevation: 38 m (125 ft)
- Population (2023): 330
  - Density: 28/km^{2} (73/sq mi)
- Time zone: UTC+01:00 (CET)
  - Summer (DST): UTC+02:00 (CEST)
- INSEE/Postal code: 40203 /40330
- ^{1} French Land Register data, which excludes lakes, ponds, glaciers > 1 km^{2} (0.386 sq mi or 247 acres) and river estuaries.

Nassiet (French pronunciation: [nasjɛ]) is a commune in the Landes department in Nouvelle-Aquitaine in southwestern France.

== Population ==
Historical population
Year	Pop.	±% p.a.
1968	334	—
1975	313	−0.92%
1982	285	−1.33%
1990	262	−1.05%
1999	279	+0.70%
2007	288	+0.40%
2012	341	+3.44%
2017	344	+0.18%
2023	330	−0.69%
Source: INSEE

== See also ==
- Communes of the Landes department
