= Saint-Geours-d'Auribat =

- Commune
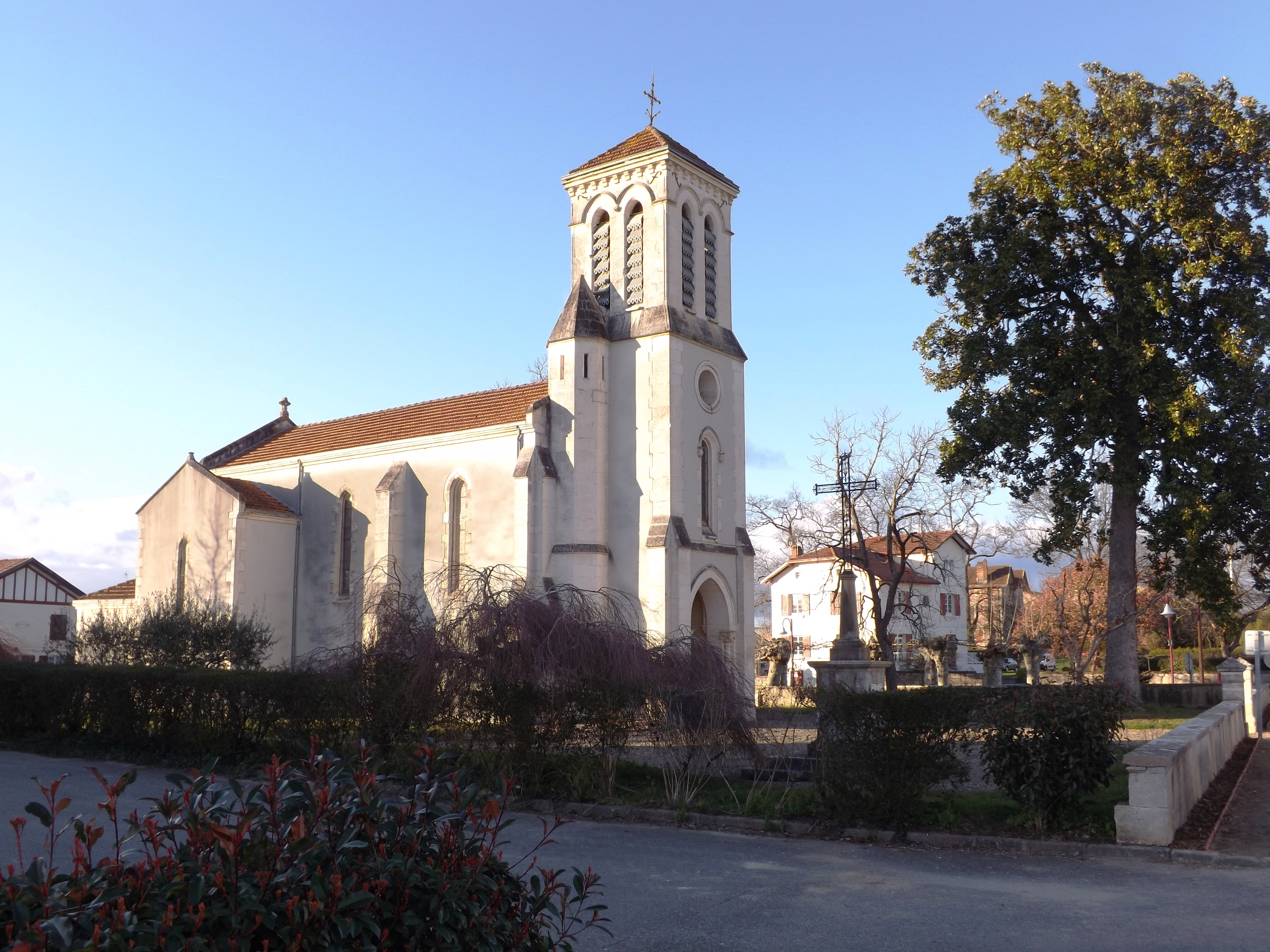
- Location of Saint-Geours-d'Auribat
- Location within France Location within Nouvelle-Aquitaine
- Coordinates: 43°45′27″N 0°50′14″W
- Country: France
- Region: Nouvelle-Aquitaine
- Department: Landes
- Arrondissement: Dax
- Canton: Coteau de Chalosse
- Intercommunality: Terres de Chalosse

Government
  - Mayor (2020–2026): Yves Ducournau
- Area^{1}: 5.47 km^{2} (2.11 sq mi)
- Elevation: 74 m (243 ft)
- Highest elevation: 86 m (282 ft)
- Lowest elevation: 15 m (49 ft)
- Population (2023): 409
  - Density: 74.8/km^{2} (194/sq mi)
- Time zone: UTC+01:00 (CET)
  - Summer (DST): UTC+02:00 (CEST)
- INSEE/Postal code: 40260 /40380
- ^{1} French Land Register data, which excludes lakes, ponds, glaciers > 1 km^{2} (0.386 sq mi or 247 acres) and river estuaries.

Saint-Geours-d'Auribat (French pronunciation: [sɛ̃ ʒuʁ doʁibat]; Occitan: Sent Jors d'Auribat) is a commune in the Landes department in Nouvelle-Aquitaine in southwestern France.

== Population ==
Historical population
Year	Pop.	±% p.a.
1968	299	—
1975	249	−2.58%
1982	248	−0.06%
1990	260	+0.59%
1999	279	+0.79%
2007	308	+1.24%
2012	374	+3.96%
2017	413	+2.00%
2023	409	−0.16%
Source: INSEE

== See also ==
- Communes of the Landes department
