= Garrey =

- Commune
- Location of Garrey
- Location within France Location within Nouvelle-Aquitaine
- Coordinates: 43°40′18″N 0°54′26″W
- Country: France
- Region: Nouvelle-Aquitaine
- Department: Landes
- Arrondissement: Dax
- Canton: Coteau de Chalosse

Government
  - Mayor (2020–2026): Chantal Omiciuolo
- Area^{1}: 4.93 km^{2} (1.90 sq mi)
- Elevation: 40 m (130 ft)
- Highest elevation: 46 m (151 ft)
- Lowest elevation: 11 m (36 ft)
- Population (2023): 215
  - Density: 43.6/km^{2} (113/sq mi)
- Time zone: UTC+01:00 (CET)
  - Summer (DST): UTC+02:00 (CEST)
- INSEE/Postal code: 40106 /40180
- ^{1} French Land Register data, which excludes lakes, ponds, glaciers > 1 km^{2} (0.386 sq mi or 247 acres) and river estuaries.

Garrey (French pronunciation: [ɡaʁɛ]; Occitan: Garrei) is a commune in the Landes department in Nouvelle-Aquitaine in southwestern France.

== Population ==
Historical population
Year	Pop.	±% p.a.
1968	172	—
1975	156	−1.39%
1982	161	+0.45%
1990	189	+2.02%
1999	181	−0.48%
2007	181	+0.00%
2012	184	+0.33%
2017	205	+2.19%
2023	215	+0.80%
Source: INSEE

== See also ==
- Communes of the Landes department
