= Gibret =

- Commune
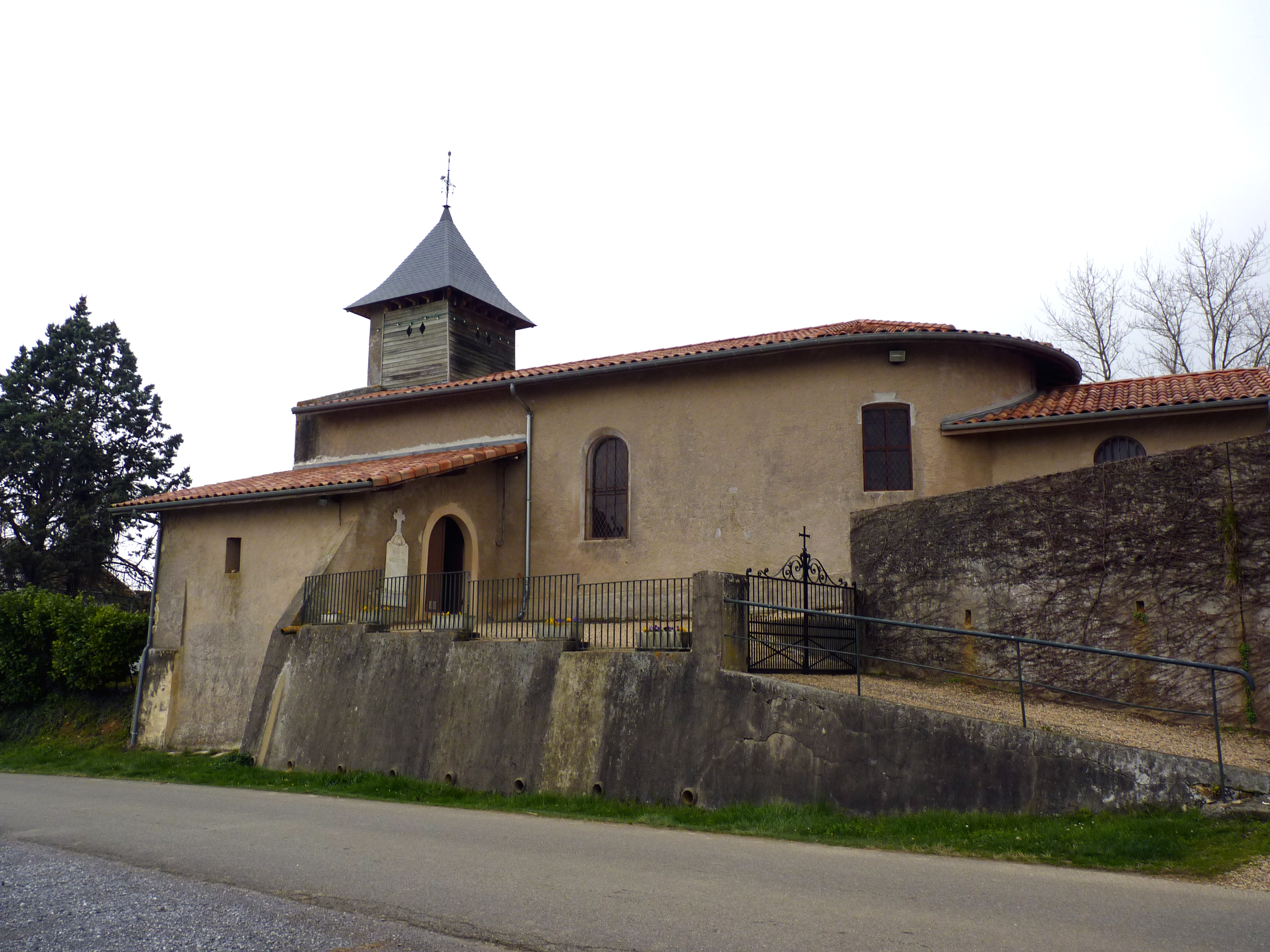
- Location of Gibret
- Location within France Location within Nouvelle-Aquitaine
- Coordinates: 43°41′17″N 0°49′15″W
- Country: France
- Region: Nouvelle-Aquitaine
- Department: Landes
- Arrondissement: Dax
- Canton: Coteau de Chalosse
- Intercommunality: Terres de Chalosse

Government
  - Mayor (2020–2026): Didier Aboze
- Area^{1}: 2.58 km^{2} (1.00 sq mi)
- Elevation: 70 m (230 ft)
- Highest elevation: 102 m (335 ft)
- Lowest elevation: 31 m (102 ft)
- Population (2023): 92
  - Density: 36/km^{2} (92/sq mi)
- Time zone: UTC+01:00 (CET)
  - Summer (DST): UTC+02:00 (CEST)
- INSEE/Postal code: 40112 /40380
- ^{1} French Land Register data, which excludes lakes, ponds, glaciers > 1 km^{2} (0.386 sq mi or 247 acres) and river estuaries.

Gibret (French pronunciation: [ʒibʁɛ]) is a commune in the Landes department in Nouvelle-Aquitaine in southwestern France.

== Population ==
Historical population
Year	Pop.	±% p.a.
1968	118	—
1975	109	−1.13%
1982	107	−0.26%
1990	102	−0.60%
1999	83	−2.26%
2007	96	+1.84%
2012	107	+2.19%
2017	102	−0.95%
2023	92	−1.71%
Source: INSEE

== See also ==
- Communes of the Landes department
