= Onard =

- Commune
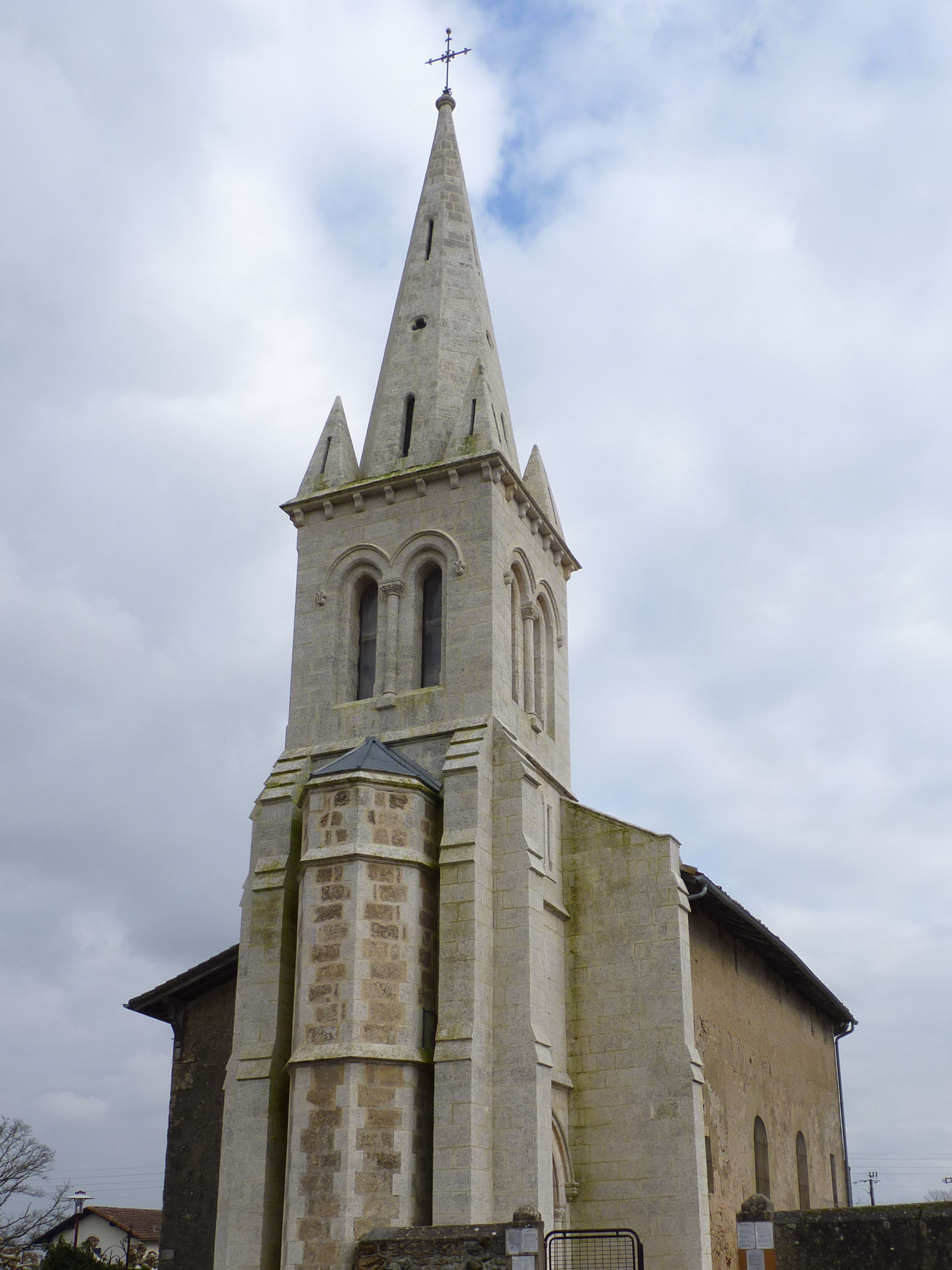
- Location of Onard
- Location within France Location within Nouvelle-Aquitaine
- Coordinates: 43°46′52″N 0°50′10″W
- Country: France
- Region: Nouvelle-Aquitaine
- Department: Landes
- Arrondissement: Dax
- Canton: Coteau de Chalosse

Government
  - Mayor (2020–2026): Martine Maury
- Area^{1}: 6.15 km^{2} (2.37 sq mi)
- Elevation: 16 m (52 ft)
- Highest elevation: 50 m (160 ft)
- Lowest elevation: 8 m (26 ft)
- Population (2023): 381
  - Density: 62.0/km^{2} (160/sq mi)
- Time zone: UTC+01:00 (CET)
  - Summer (DST): UTC+02:00 (CEST)
- INSEE/Postal code: 40208 /40380
- ^{1} French Land Register data, which excludes lakes, ponds, glaciers > 1 km^{2} (0.386 sq mi or 247 acres) and river estuaries.

Onard (French pronunciation: [ɔnaʁ]) is a commune in the Landes department in Nouvelle-Aquitaine in southwestern France.

== Population ==
Historical population
Year	Pop.	±% p.a.
1968	303	—
1975	310	+0.33%
1982	315	+0.23%
1990	325	+0.39%
1999	296	−1.03%
2007	325	+1.18%
2012	379	+3.12%
2017	372	−0.37%
2023	381	+0.40%
Source: INSEE

== See also ==
- Communes of the Landes department
