= Bergouey =

- Commune
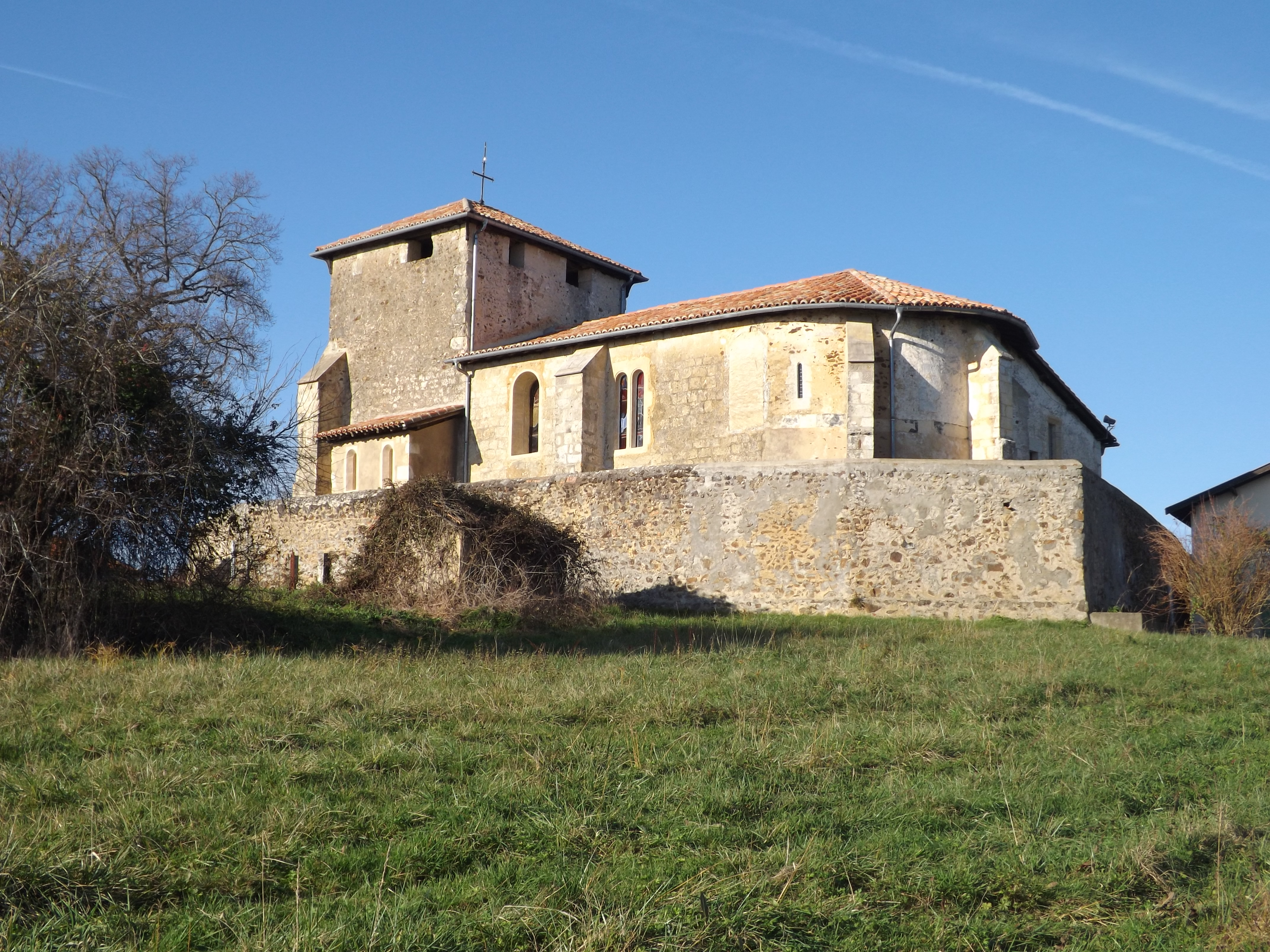
- The church of Bergouey
- Location of Bergouey
- Location within France Location within Nouvelle-Aquitaine
- Coordinates: 43°40′08″N 0°43′13″W
- Country: France
- Region: Nouvelle-Aquitaine
- Department: Landes
- Arrondissement: Dax
- Canton: Coteau de Chalosse
- Intercommunality: Terres de Chalosse

Government
  - Mayor (2020–2026): Sandrine Laville
- Area^{1}: 4.39 km^{2} (1.69 sq mi)
- Elevation: 60 m (200 ft)
- Highest elevation: 122 m (400 ft)
- Lowest elevation: 47 m (154 ft)
- Population (2023): 110
  - Density: 25/km^{2} (65/sq mi)
- Time zone: UTC+01:00 (CET)
  - Summer (DST): UTC+02:00 (CEST)
- INSEE/Postal code: 40038 /40250
- ^{1} French Land Register data, which excludes lakes, ponds, glaciers > 1 km^{2} (0.386 sq mi or 247 acres) and river estuaries.

Bergouey (French pronunciation: [bɛʁɡwɛj]; Occitan: Vergüei) is a commune in the Landes department in Nouvelle-Aquitaine in southwestern France.

== Population ==
Historical population
| Year | Pop. | ±% p.a. |
|---|---|---|
| 1968 | 133 | — |
| 1975 | 126 | −0.77% |
| 1982 | 118 | −0.93% |
| 1990 | 111 | −0.76% |
| 1999 | 110 | −0.10% |
| 2007 | 117 | +0.77% |
| 2012 | 94 | −4.28% |
| 2017 | 98 | +0.84% |
| 2023 | 110 | +1.94% |
Source: INSEE

== See also ==
- Communes of the Landes department
