= Maylis =

- Commune
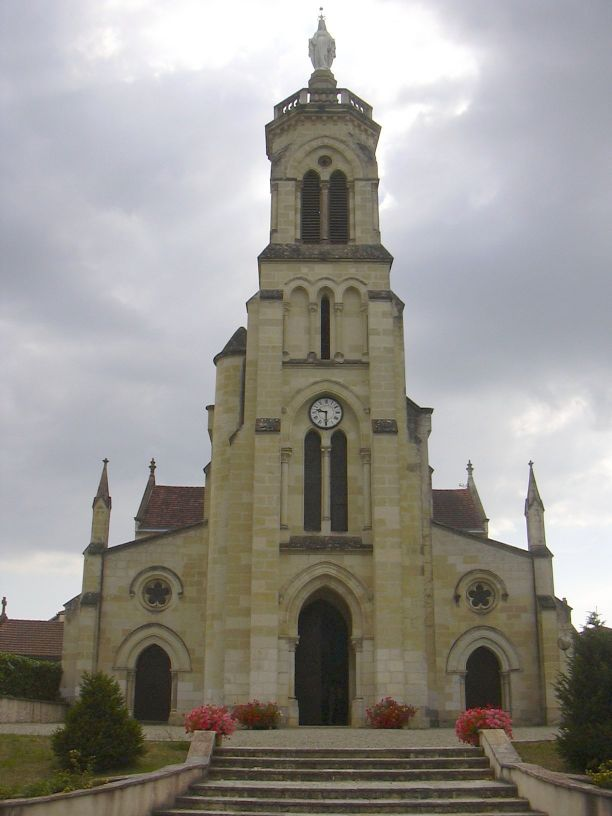
- The church of Our Lady, in Maylis
- Location of Maylis
- Location within France Location within Nouvelle-Aquitaine
- Coordinates: 43°41′52″N 0°40′46″W
- Country: France
- Region: Nouvelle-Aquitaine
- Department: Landes
- Arrondissement: Dax
- Canton: Coteau de Chalosse
- Intercommunality: Terres de Chalosse

Government
  - Mayor (2020–2026): Anne-Marie Lailheugue
- Area^{1}: 12.21 km^{2} (4.71 sq mi)
- Elevation: 83 m (272 ft)
- Highest elevation: 122 m (400 ft)
- Lowest elevation: 43 m (141 ft)
- Population (2023): 294
  - Density: 24.1/km^{2} (62.4/sq mi)
- Time zone: UTC+01:00 (CET)
  - Summer (DST): UTC+02:00 (CEST)
- INSEE/Postal code: 40177 /40250
- ^{1} French Land Register data, which excludes lakes, ponds, glaciers > 1 km^{2} (0.386 sq mi or 247 acres) and river estuaries.

Maylis is a commune in the Landes department in Nouvelle-Aquitaine in south-western France.

== See also ==
- Communes of the Landes department
