= Saint-Jean-de-Lier =

- Commune
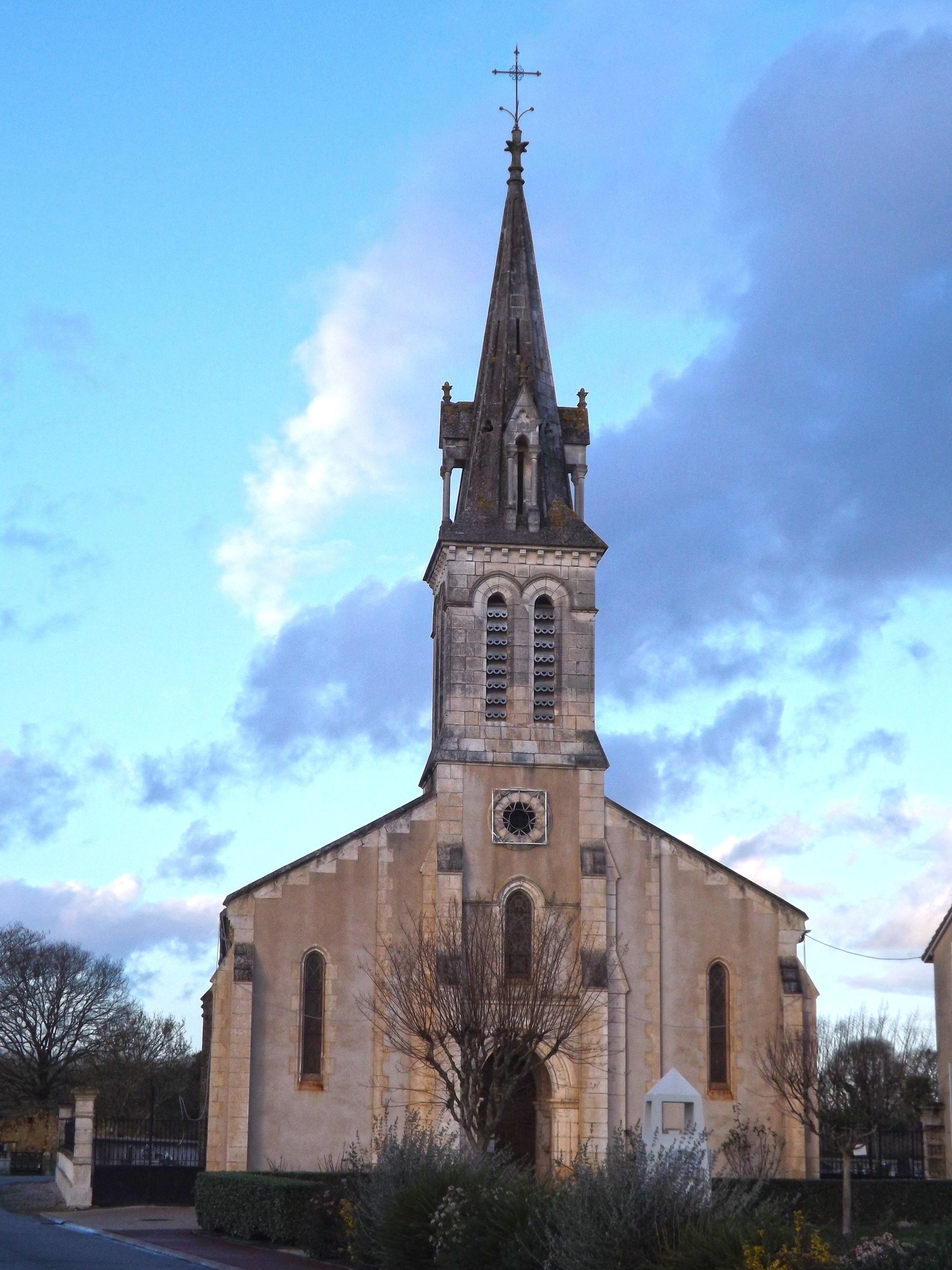
- Location of Saint-Jean-de-Lier
- Location within France Location within Nouvelle-Aquitaine
- Coordinates: 43°47′26″N 0°52′39″W
- Country: France
- Region: Nouvelle-Aquitaine
- Department: Landes
- Arrondissement: Dax
- Canton: Coteau de Chalosse

Government
  - Mayor (2020–2026): Thierry Dubos
- Area^{1}: 8.15 km^{2} (3.15 sq mi)
- Elevation: 12 m (39 ft)
- Highest elevation: 43 m (141 ft)
- Lowest elevation: 6 m (20 ft)
- Population (2023): 405
  - Density: 49.7/km^{2} (129/sq mi)
- Time zone: UTC+01:00 (CET)
  - Summer (DST): UTC+02:00 (CEST)
- INSEE/Postal code: 40263 /40380
- ^{1} French Land Register data, which excludes lakes, ponds, glaciers > 1 km^{2} (0.386 sq mi or 247 acres) and river estuaries.

Saint-Jean-de-Lier (French pronunciation: [sɛ̃ ʒɑ̃ də lje]; Gascon: Sent Joan de Lièr) is a commune in the Landes department in Nouvelle-Aquitaine in southwestern France.

== Population ==
Historical population
Year	Pop.	±% p.a.
1968	353	—
1975	316	−1.57%
1982	321	+0.22%
1990	309	−0.48%
1999	323	+0.49%
2007	334	+0.42%
2012	408	+4.08%
2017	414	+0.29%
2023	405	−0.37%
Source: INSEE

== See also ==
- Communes of the Landes department
