= Marpaps =

- Commune
- Location of Marpaps
- Location within France Location within Nouvelle-Aquitaine
- Coordinates: 43°34′22″N 0°40′57″W
- Country: France
- Region: Nouvelle-Aquitaine
- Department: Landes
- Arrondissement: Dax
- Canton: Coteau de Chalosse

Government
  - Mayor (2020–2026): Bernard Dugachard
- Area^{1}: 6.84 km^{2} (2.64 sq mi)
- Elevation: 126 m (413 ft)
- Highest elevation: 142 m (466 ft)
- Lowest elevation: 72 m (236 ft)
- Population (2023): 129
  - Density: 18.9/km^{2} (48.8/sq mi)
- Time zone: UTC+01:00 (CET)
  - Summer (DST): UTC+02:00 (CEST)
- INSEE/Postal code: 40173 /40330
- ^{1} French Land Register data, which excludes lakes, ponds, glaciers > 1 km^{2} (0.386 sq mi or 247 acres) and river estuaries.

Marpaps is a commune in the Landes department in Nouvelle-Aquitaine in south-western France.

== See also ==
- Communes of the Landes department
