= Canton of Coteau de Chalosse =

Coordinates: 43.71°N 0.84°W

The canton of Coteau de Chalosse is an administrative division of the Landes department, southwestern France. It was created at the French canton reorganisation which came into effect in March 2015. Its seat is in Montfort-en-Chalosse.

It consists of the following communes:

1. Amou
2. Argelos
3. Arsague
4. Baigts
5. Bassercles
6. Bastennes
7. Bergouey
8. Beyries
9. Bonnegarde
10. Brassempouy
11. Cassen
12. Castaignos-Souslens
13. Castelnau-Chalosse
14. Castel-Sarrazin
15. Caupenne
16. Clermont
17. Doazit
18. Donzacq
19. Gamarde-les-Bains
20. Garrey
21. Gaujacq
22. Gibret
23. Goos
24. Gousse
25. Hauriet
26. Hinx
27. Lahosse
28. Larbey
29. Laurède
30. Louer
31. Lourquen
32. Marpaps
33. Maylis
34. Montfort-en-Chalosse
35. Mugron
36. Nassiet
37. Nerbis
38. Nousse
39. Onard
40. Ozourt
41. Pomarez
42. Poyanne
43. Poyartin
44. Préchacq-les-Bains
45. Saint-Aubin
46. Saint-Geours-d'Auribat
47. Saint-Jean-de-Lier
48. Sort-en-Chalosse
49. Toulouzette
50. Vicq-d'Auribat
