= Lahosse =

- Commune
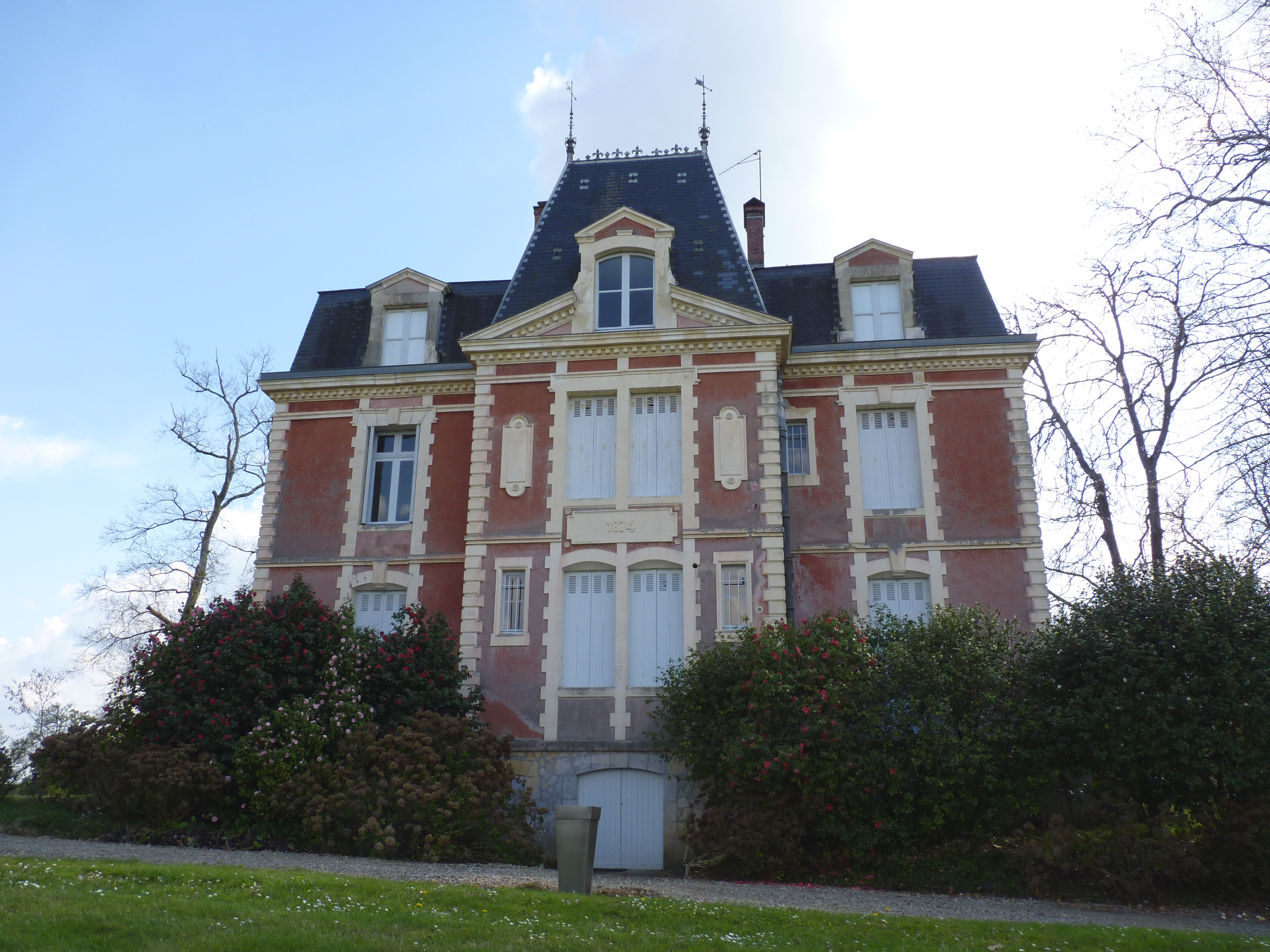
- The château in Lahosse
- Location of Lahosse
- Location within France Location within Nouvelle-Aquitaine
- Coordinates: 43°42′49″N 0°47′43″W
- Country: France
- Region: Nouvelle-Aquitaine
- Department: Landes
- Arrondissement: Dax
- Canton: Coteau de Chalosse
- Intercommunality: Terres de Chalosse

Government
  - Mayor (2020–2026): Jean-Louis Capdeville
- Area^{1}: 8.08 km^{2} (3.12 sq mi)
- Elevation: 90 m (300 ft)
- Highest elevation: 101 m (331 ft)
- Lowest elevation: 25 m (82 ft)
- Population (2023): 288
  - Density: 35.6/km^{2} (92.3/sq mi)
- Time zone: UTC+01:00 (CET)
  - Summer (DST): UTC+02:00 (CEST)
- INSEE/Postal code: 40141 /40250
- ^{1} French Land Register data, which excludes lakes, ponds, glaciers > 1 km^{2} (0.386 sq mi or 247 acres) and river estuaries.

Lahosse (French pronunciation: [la.ɔs]; Occitan: La Hòssa) is a commune in the Landes department in Nouvelle-Aquitaine in south-western France.

== See also ==
- Communes of the Landes department
