= Ozourt =

- Commune
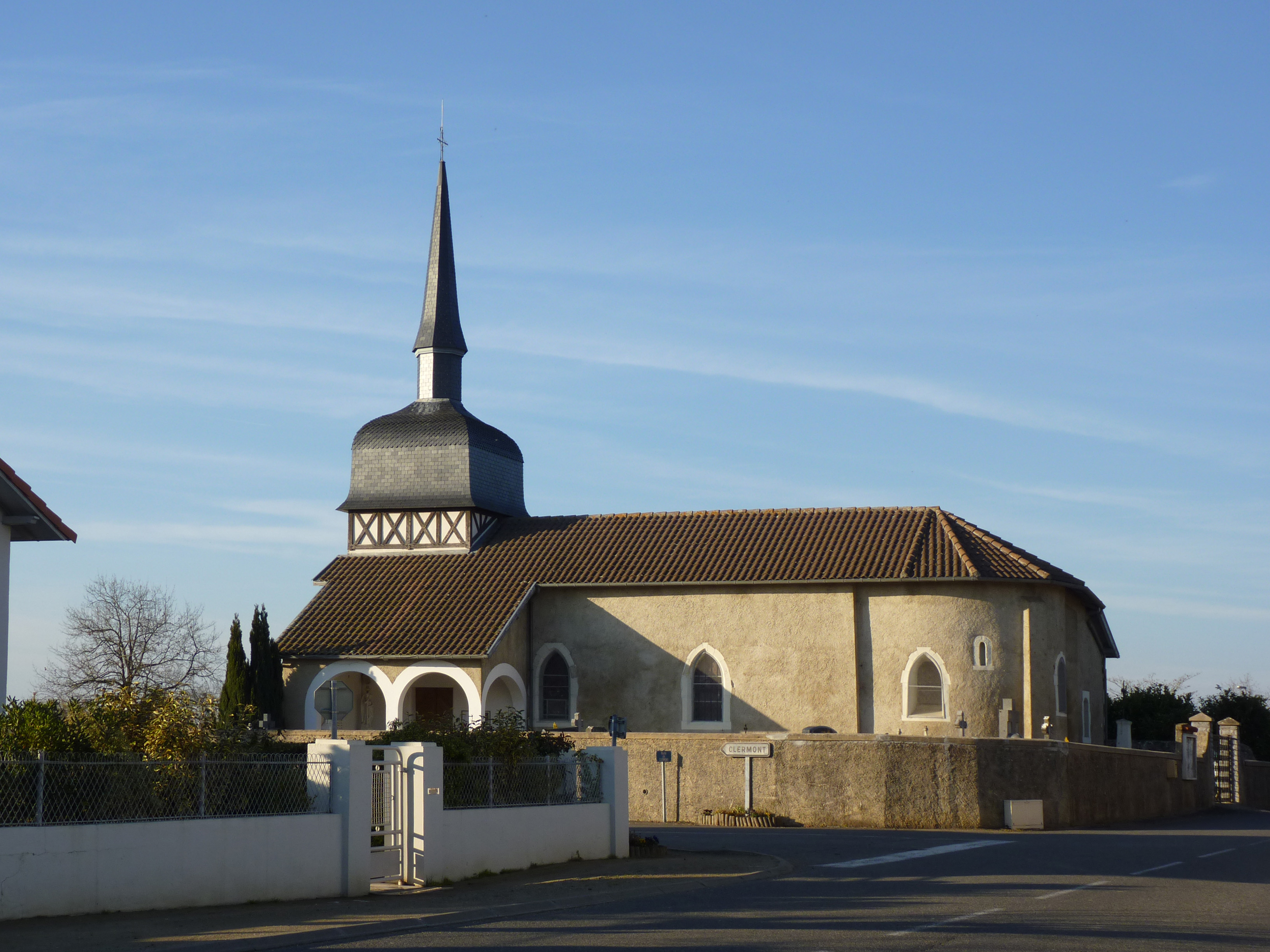
- Location of Ozourt
- Location within France Location within Nouvelle-Aquitaine
- Coordinates: 43°39′52″N 0°52′30″W
- Country: France
- Region: Nouvelle-Aquitaine
- Department: Landes
- Arrondissement: Dax
- Canton: Coteau de Chalosse

Government
  - Mayor (2020–2026): Véronique Lanuque
- Area^{1}: 3.97 km^{2} (1.53 sq mi)
- Elevation: 30 m (98 ft)
- Highest elevation: 51 m (167 ft)
- Lowest elevation: 17 m (56 ft)
- Population (2023): 204
  - Density: 51.4/km^{2} (133/sq mi)
- Time zone: UTC+01:00 (CET)
  - Summer (DST): UTC+02:00 (CEST)
- INSEE/Postal code: 40216 /40380
- ^{1} French Land Register data, which excludes lakes, ponds, glaciers > 1 km^{2} (0.386 sq mi or 247 acres) and river estuaries.

Ozourt (French pronunciation: [ozuʁ]; Occitan: Osort) is a commune in the Landes department in Nouvelle-Aquitaine in southwestern France.

== Population ==
Historical population
Year	Pop.	±% p.a.
1968	205	—
1975	205	+0.00%
1982	185	−1.46%
1990	172	−0.91%
1999	155	−1.15%
2007	181	+1.96%
2012	205	+2.52%
2017	203	−0.20%
2023	204	+0.08%
Source: INSEE

== See also ==
- Communes of the Landes department
