= Bassercles =

- Commune
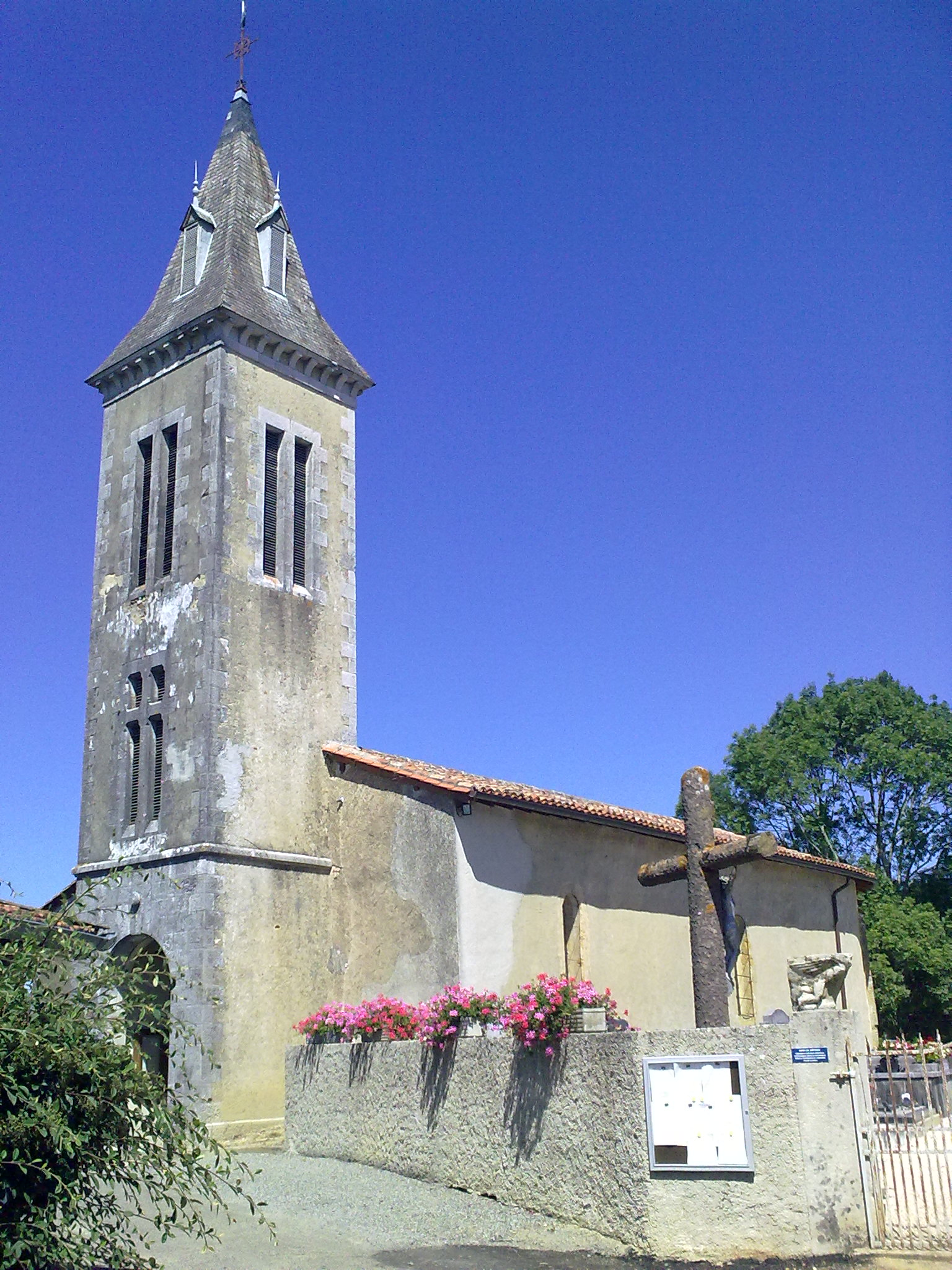
- The church of Bassercles

- Coat of arms
- Location of Bassercles
- Location within France Location within Nouvelle-Aquitaine
- Coordinates: 43°33′10″N 0°37′18″W
- Country: France
- Region: Nouvelle-Aquitaine
- Department: Landes
- Arrondissement: Dax
- Canton: Coteau de Chalosse

Government
  - Mayor (2020–2026): Jean-Pierre Cazenave
- Area^{1}: 6.59 km^{2} (2.54 sq mi)
- Elevation: 160 m (520 ft)
- Highest elevation: 167 m (548 ft)
- Lowest elevation: 65 m (213 ft)
- Population (2023): 151
  - Density: 22.9/km^{2} (59.3/sq mi)
- Time zone: UTC+01:00 (CET)
  - Summer (DST): UTC+02:00 (CEST)
- INSEE/Postal code: 40027 /40700
- ^{1} French Land Register data, which excludes lakes, ponds, glaciers > 1 km^{2} (0.386 sq mi or 247 acres) and river estuaries.

Bassercles (French pronunciation: [basɛʁkl]; Occitan: Basserclas) is a commune in the Landes department in Nouvelle-Aquitaine in southwestern France.

== Population ==
Historical population
Year	Pop.	±% p.a.
1968	150	—
1975	143	−0.68%
1982	122	−2.24%
1990	120	−0.21%
1999	122	+0.18%
2007	108	−1.51%
2012	124	+2.80%
2017	155	+4.56%
2023	151	−0.43%
Source: INSEE

== See also ==
- Communes of the Landes department
