= Louer =

- Commune
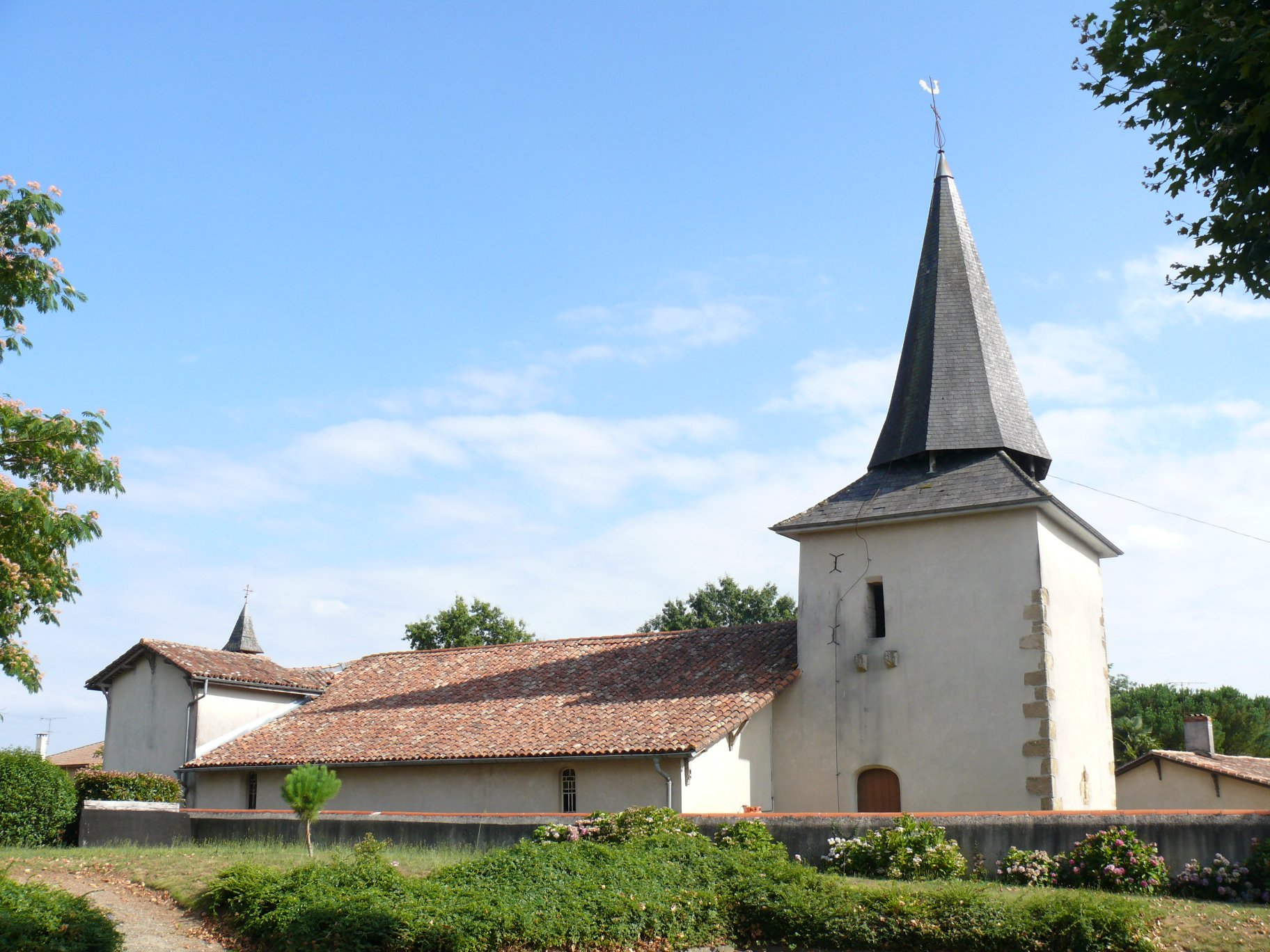
- The church in Louer
- Location of Louer
- Location within France Location within Nouvelle-Aquitaine
- Coordinates: 43°45′25″N 0°53′28″W
- Country: France
- Region: Nouvelle-Aquitaine
- Department: Landes
- Arrondissement: Dax
- Canton: Coteau de Chalosse
- Intercommunality: Terres de Chalosse

Government
  - Mayor (2020–2026): Jérôme Fritsch
- Area^{1}: 2.85 km^{2} (1.10 sq mi)
- Elevation: 38 m (125 ft)
- Highest elevation: 52 m (171 ft)
- Lowest elevation: 10 m (33 ft)
- Population (2023): 335
  - Density: 118/km^{2} (304/sq mi)
- Time zone: UTC+01:00 (CET)
  - Summer (DST): UTC+02:00 (CEST)
- INSEE/Postal code: 40159 /40380
- ^{1} French Land Register data, which excludes lakes, ponds, glaciers > 1 km^{2} (0.386 sq mi or 247 acres) and river estuaries.

Louer (Occitan: Loèr) is a commune in the Landes department in Nouvelle-Aquitaine in south-western France.

== See also ==
- Communes of the Landes department
