= Nousse =

- Commune
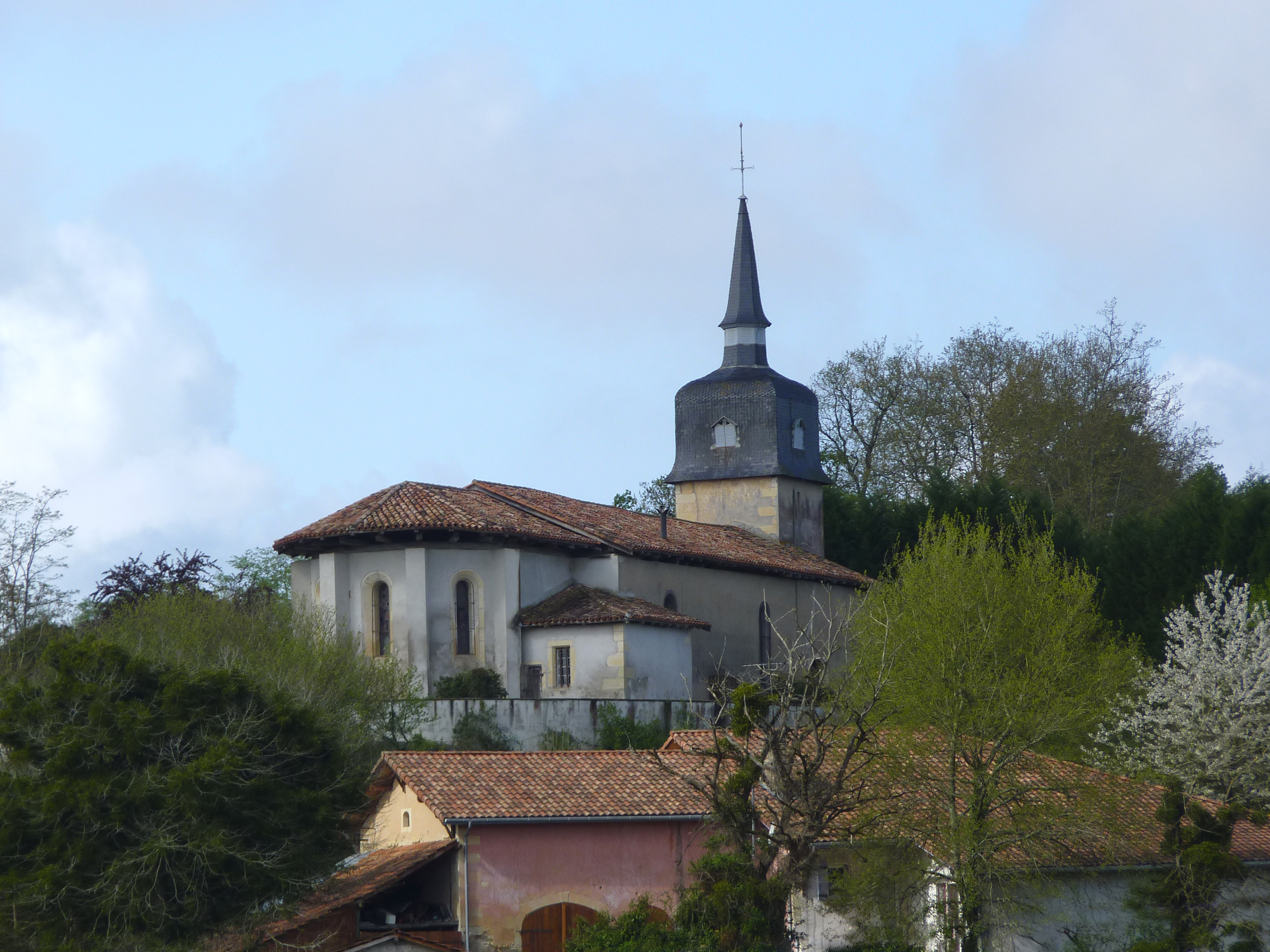
- Location of Nousse
- Location within France Location within Nouvelle-Aquitaine
- Coordinates: 43°43′04″N 0°49′16″W
- Country: France
- Region: Nouvelle-Aquitaine
- Department: Landes
- Arrondissement: Dax
- Canton: Coteau de Chalosse

Government
  - Mayor (2020–2026): Valérie Jacqueline
- Area^{1}: 3.87 km^{2} (1.49 sq mi)
- Elevation: 84 m (276 ft)
- Highest elevation: 107 m (351 ft)
- Lowest elevation: 22 m (72 ft)
- Population (2023): 252
  - Density: 65.1/km^{2} (169/sq mi)
- Time zone: UTC+01:00 (CET)
  - Summer (DST): UTC+02:00 (CEST)
- INSEE/Postal code: 40205 /40380
- ^{1} French Land Register data, which excludes lakes, ponds, glaciers > 1 km^{2} (0.386 sq mi or 247 acres) and river estuaries.

Nousse (French pronunciation: [nus]; Gascon: Nossa) is a commune in the Landes department in Nouvelle-Aquitaine in southwestern France.

== Population ==
Historical population
Year	Pop.	±% p.a.
1968	220	—
1975	205	−1.00%
1982	216	+0.75%
1990	219	+0.17%
1999	226	+0.35%
2007	264	+1.96%
2012	257	−0.54%
2017	244	−1.03%
2023	252	+0.54%
Source: INSEE

== See also ==
- Communes of the Landes department
