= Lourquen =

- Commune
- Location of Lourquen
- Location within France Location within Nouvelle-Aquitaine
- Coordinates: 43°43′55″N 0°47′06″W
- Country: France
- Region: Nouvelle-Aquitaine
- Department: Landes
- Arrondissement: Dax
- Canton: Coteau de Chalosse
- Intercommunality: Terres de Chalosse

Government
  - Mayor (2020–2026): Jean-Jacques Dufau
- Area^{1}: 5.9 km^{2} (2.3 sq mi)
- Elevation: 62 m (203 ft)
- Highest elevation: 86 m (282 ft)
- Lowest elevation: 24 m (79 ft)
- Population (2023): 193
  - Density: 33/km^{2} (85/sq mi)
- Time zone: UTC+01:00 (CET)
  - Summer (DST): UTC+02:00 (CEST)
- INSEE/Postal code: 40160 /40250
- ^{1} French Land Register data, which excludes lakes, ponds, glaciers > 1 km^{2} (0.386 sq mi or 247 acres) and river estuaries.

Lourquen is a commune in the Landes department in Nouvelle-Aquitaine in south-western France.

== See also ==
- Communes of the Landes department
