= Donzacq =

- Commune
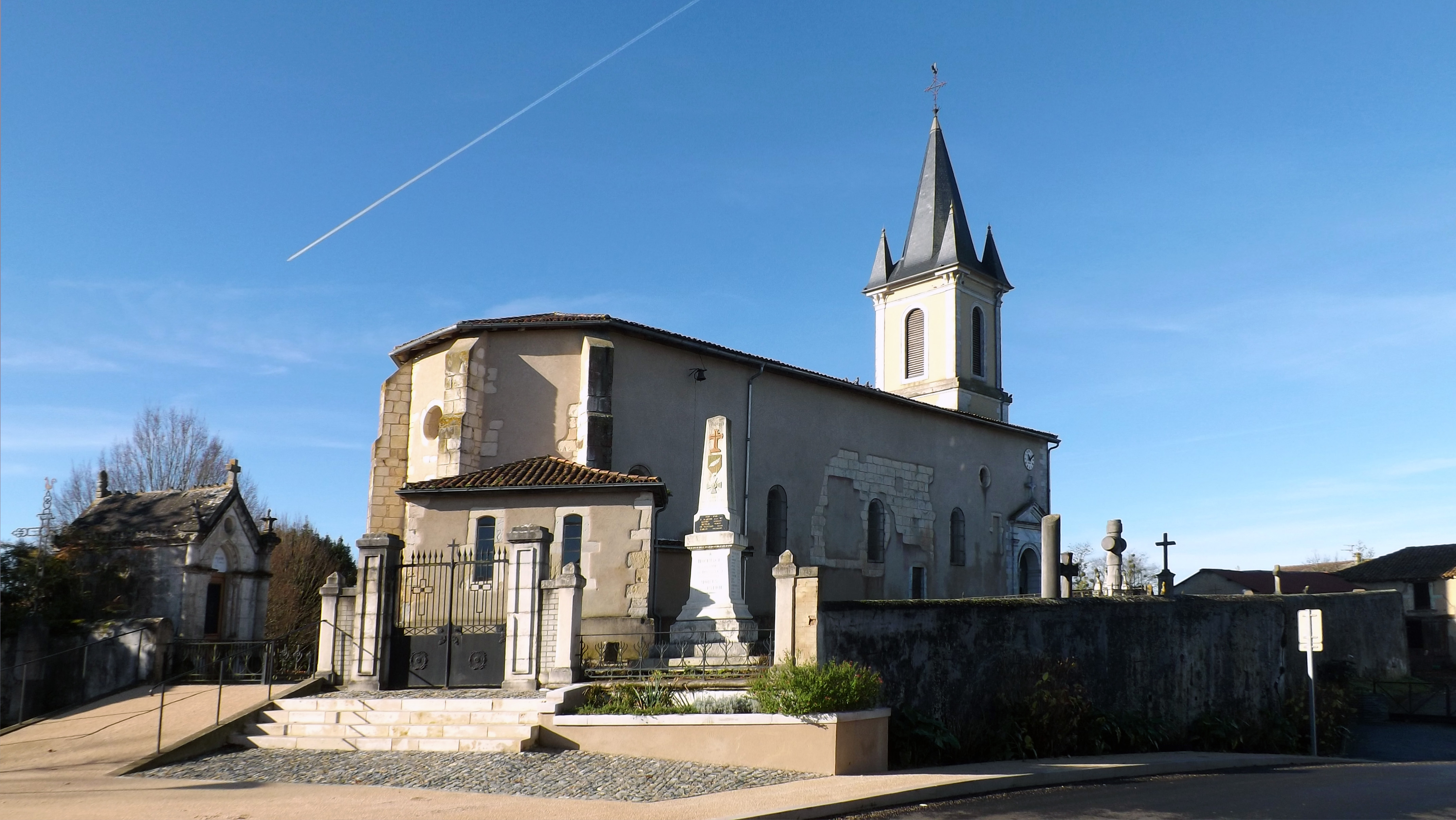
- Location of Donzacq
- Location within France Location within Nouvelle-Aquitaine
- Coordinates: 43°39′27″N 0°48′11″W
- Country: France
- Region: Nouvelle-Aquitaine
- Department: Landes
- Arrondissement: Dax
- Canton: Coteau de Chalosse

Government
  - Mayor (2020–2026): Thierry Laborde
- Area^{1}: 11.7 km^{2} (4.5 sq mi)
- Elevation: 72 m (236 ft)
- Highest elevation: 112 m (367 ft)
- Lowest elevation: 20 m (66 ft)
- Population (2023): 452
  - Density: 38.6/km^{2} (100/sq mi)
- Time zone: UTC+01:00 (CET)
  - Summer (DST): UTC+02:00 (CEST)
- INSEE/Postal code: 40090 /40360
- ^{1} French Land Register data, which excludes lakes, ponds, glaciers > 1 km^{2} (0.386 sq mi or 247 acres) and river estuaries.

Donzacq (French pronunciation: [dɔ̃zak]; Occitan: Donzac) is a commune in the Landes department in Nouvelle-Aquitaine in southwestern France.

== Population ==
Historical population
Year	Pop.	±% p.a.
1968	505	—
1975	462	−1.26%
1982	447	−0.47%
1990	392	−1.63%
1999	388	−0.11%
2007	438	+1.53%
2012	461	+1.03%
2017	481	+0.85%
2023	452	−1.03%
Source: INSEE

== See also ==
- Communes of the Landes department
