= Vicq-d'Auribat =

- Commune
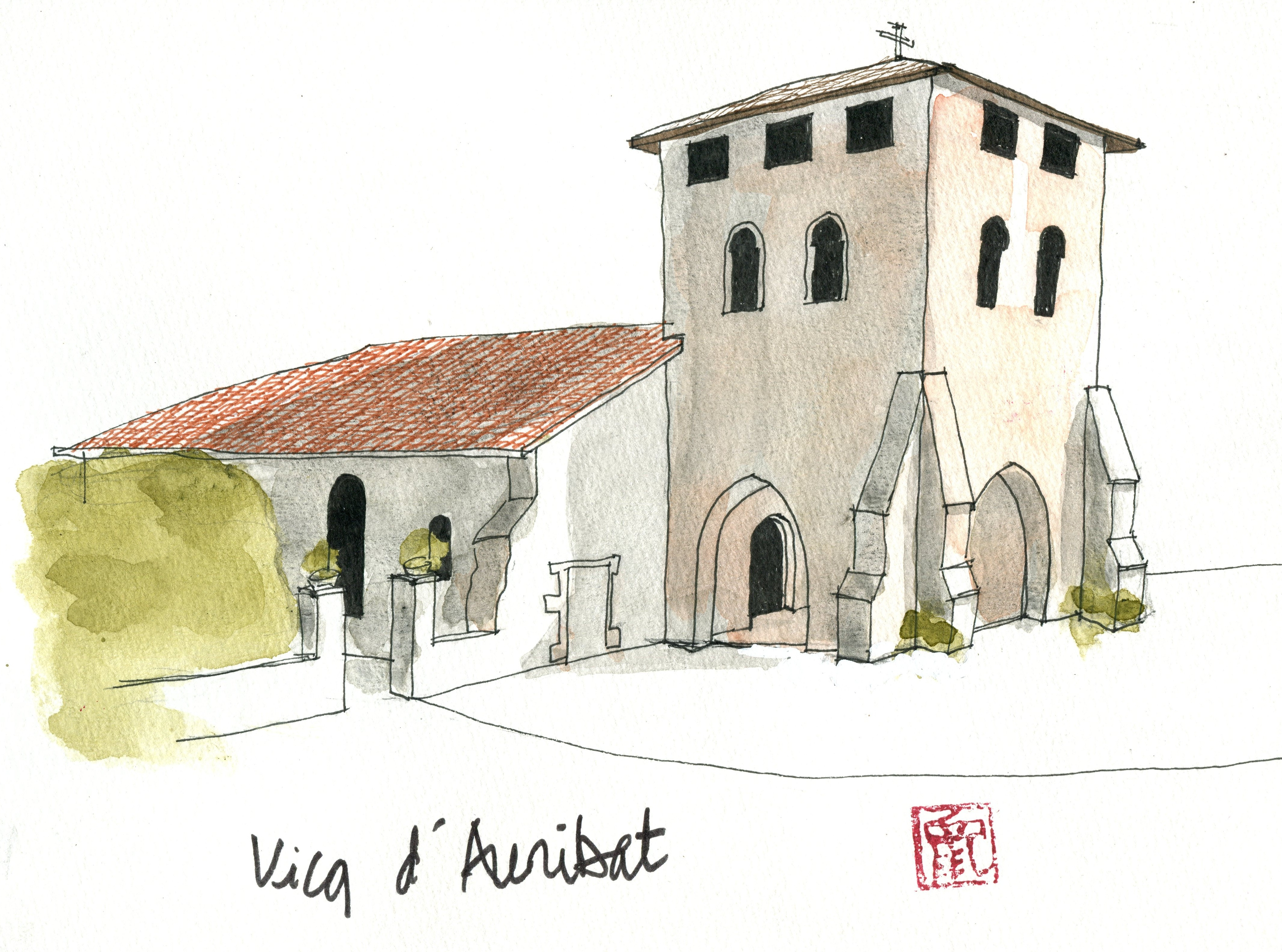
- Location of Vicq-d'Auribat
- Location within France Location within Nouvelle-Aquitaine
- Coordinates: 43°47′09″N 0°51′30″W
- Country: France
- Region: Nouvelle-Aquitaine
- Department: Landes
- Arrondissement: Dax
- Canton: Coteau de Chalosse

Government
  - Mayor (2020–2026): Pacal Hontans
- Area^{1}: 4.2 km^{2} (1.6 sq mi)
- Elevation: 13 m (43 ft)
- Highest elevation: 45 m (148 ft)
- Lowest elevation: 9 m (30 ft)
- Population (2023): 243
  - Density: 58/km^{2} (150/sq mi)
- Time zone: UTC+01:00 (CET)
  - Summer (DST): UTC+02:00 (CEST)
- INSEE/Postal code: 40324 /40380
- ^{1} French Land Register data, which excludes lakes, ponds, glaciers > 1 km^{2} (0.386 sq mi or 247 acres) and river estuaries.

Vicq-d'Auribat (French pronunciation: [vik doʁibat]; Occitan: Vic d'Auribat) is a commune in the Landes department in Nouvelle-Aquitaine in southwestern France.

== Population ==
Historical population
Year	Pop.	±% p.a.
1968	204	—
1975	189	−1.09%
1982	177	−0.93%
1990	190	+0.89%
1999	189	−0.06%
2007	257	+3.92%
2012	266	+0.69%
2017	262	−0.30%
2023	243	−1.25%
Source: INSEE

== See also ==
- Communes of the Landes department
