= Bastennes =

- Commune
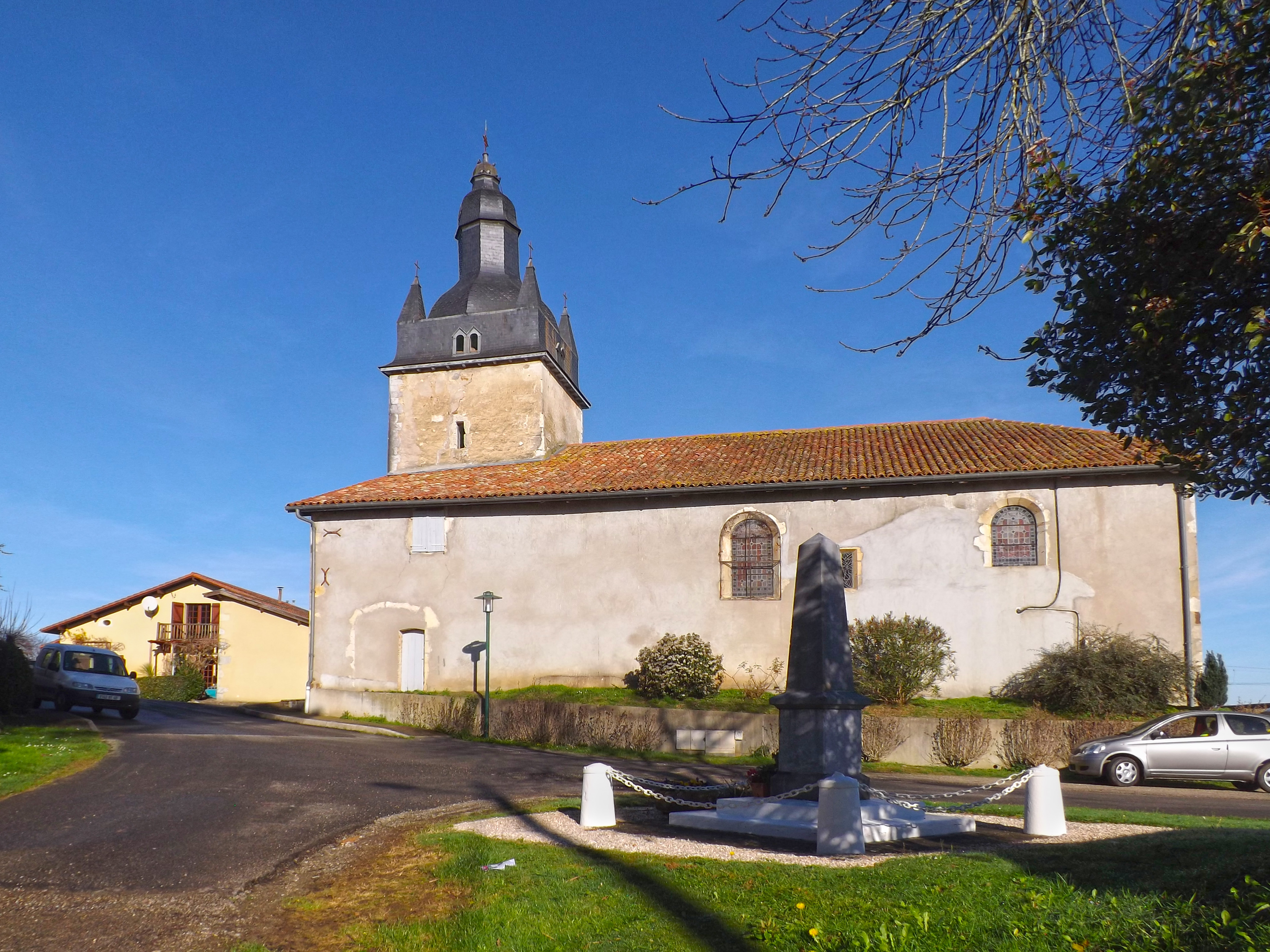
- The church of Bastennes
- Location of Bastennes
- Location within France Location within Nouvelle-Aquitaine
- Coordinates: 43°39′06″N 0°47′00″W
- Country: France
- Region: Nouvelle-Aquitaine
- Department: Landes
- Arrondissement: Dax
- Canton: Coteau de Chalosse

Government
  - Mayor (2020–2026): Jean-Maurice Dulayet
- Area^{1}: 7.29 km^{2} (2.81 sq mi)
- Elevation: 98 m (322 ft)
- Highest elevation: 98 m (322 ft)
- Lowest elevation: 24 m (79 ft)
- Population (2023): 237
  - Density: 32.5/km^{2} (84.2/sq mi)
- Time zone: UTC+01:00 (CET)
  - Summer (DST): UTC+02:00 (CEST)
- INSEE/Postal code: 40028 /40360
- ^{1} French Land Register data, which excludes lakes, ponds, glaciers > 1 km^{2} (0.386 sq mi or 247 acres) and river estuaries.

Bastennes (French pronunciation: [bastɛn]; Occitan: Bastenas) is a commune in the Landes department in Nouvelle-Aquitaine in southwestern France.

== Population ==
Historical population
Year	Pop.	±% p.a.
1968	259	—
1975	237	−1.26%
1982	241	+0.24%
1990	227	−0.75%
1999	241	+0.67%
2007	254	+0.66%
2012	260	+0.47%
2017	255	−0.39%
2023	237	−1.21%
Source: INSEE

== See also ==
- Communes of the Landes department
