= Castelnau-Chalosse =

- Commune
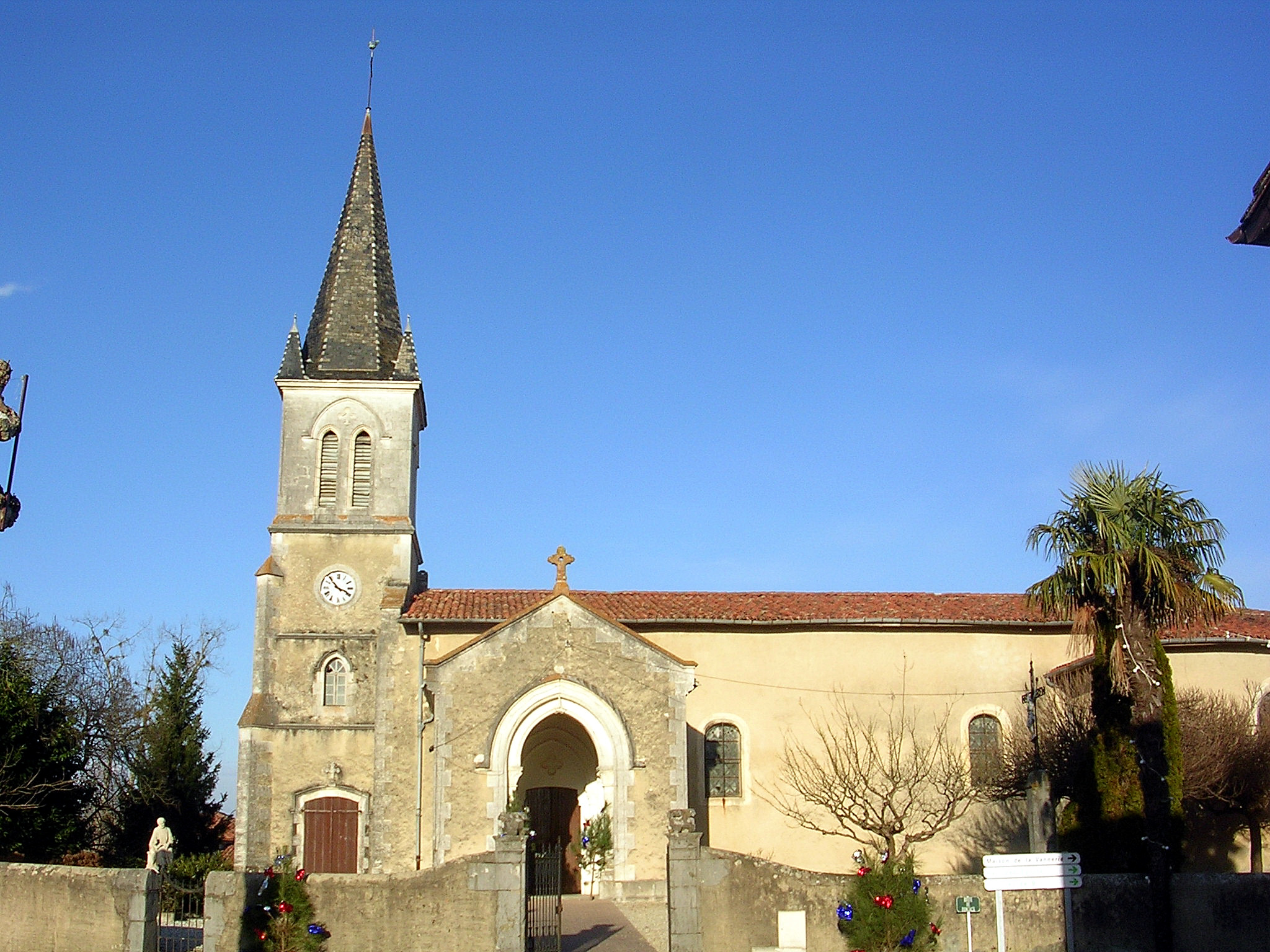
- Location of Castelnau-Chalosse
- Location within France Location within Nouvelle-Aquitaine
- Coordinates: 43°39′55″N 0°50′34″W
- Country: France
- Region: Nouvelle-Aquitaine
- Department: Landes
- Arrondissement: Dax
- Canton: Coteau de Chalosse

Government
  - Mayor (2020–2026): Christine Fournadet
- Area^{1}: 10.66 km^{2} (4.12 sq mi)
- Elevation: 102 m (335 ft)
- Highest elevation: 96 m (315 ft)
- Lowest elevation: 17 m (56 ft)
- Population (2023): 593
  - Density: 55.6/km^{2} (144/sq mi)
- Time zone: UTC+01:00 (CET)
  - Summer (DST): UTC+02:00 (CEST)
- INSEE/Postal code: 40071 /40360
- ^{1} French Land Register data, which excludes lakes, ponds, glaciers > 1 km^{2} (0.386 sq mi or 247 acres) and river estuaries.

Castelnau-Chalosse (French pronunciation: [kastɛlno ʃalɔs]; Occitan: Castèthnau de Shalòssa) is a commune in the Landes department in Nouvelle-Aquitaine in southwestern France.

== Population ==
Historical population
Year	Pop.	±% p.a.
1968	517	—
1975	501	−0.45%
1982	475	−0.76%
1990	472	−0.08%
1999	435	−0.90%
2007	515	+2.13%
2012	592	+2.83%
2017	601	+0.30%
2023	593	−0.22%
Source: INSEE

== See also ==
- Communes of the Landes department
