= Caupenne =

- Commune
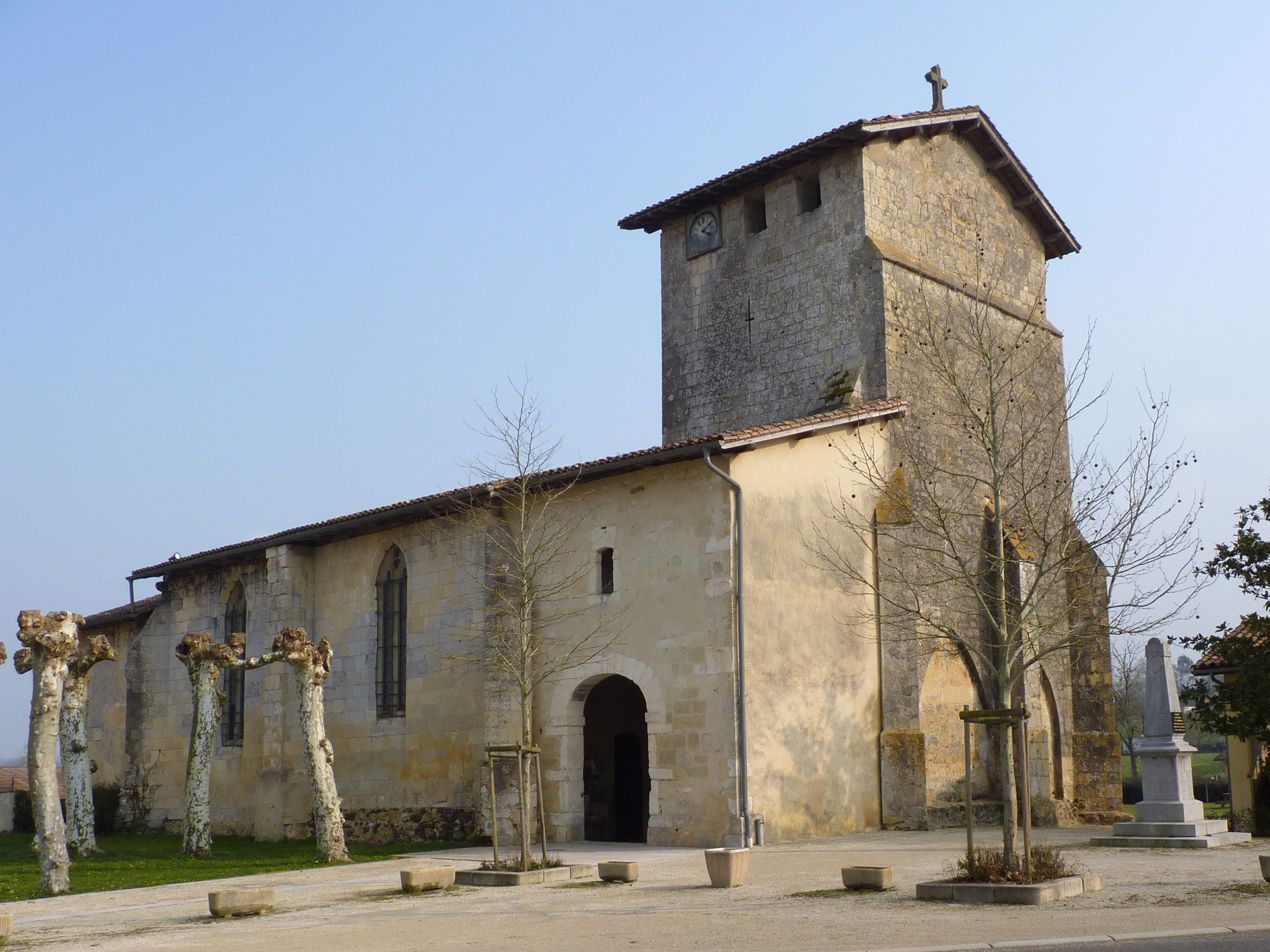
- Location of Caupenne
- Location within France Location within Nouvelle-Aquitaine
- Coordinates: 43°41′04″N 0°44′39″W
- Country: France
- Region: Nouvelle-Aquitaine
- Department: Landes
- Arrondissement: Dax
- Canton: Coteau de Chalosse
- Intercommunality: Terres de Chalosse

Government
  - Mayor (2020–2026): Ghislaine Lalanne
- Area^{1}: 15.22 km^{2} (5.88 sq mi)
- Elevation: 56 m (184 ft)
- Highest elevation: 122 m (400 ft)
- Lowest elevation: 32 m (105 ft)
- Population (2023): 402
  - Density: 26.4/km^{2} (68.4/sq mi)
- Time zone: UTC+01:00 (CET)
  - Summer (DST): UTC+02:00 (CEST)
- INSEE/Postal code: 40078 /40250
- ^{1} French Land Register data, which excludes lakes, ponds, glaciers > 1 km^{2} (0.386 sq mi or 247 acres) and river estuaries.

Caupenne (French pronunciation: [kopɛn]; Occitan: Caupena) is a commune in the Landes department in Nouvelle-Aquitaine in southwestern France.

== Population ==
Historical population
Year	Pop.	±% p.a.
1968	463	—
1975	460	−0.09%
1982	433	−0.86%
1990	399	−1.02%
1999	361	−1.11%
2007	398	+1.23%
2012	411	+0.64%
2017	404	−0.34%
2023	402	−0.08%
Source: INSEE

== See also ==
- Communes of the Landes department
