= Castaignos-Souslens =

- Commune
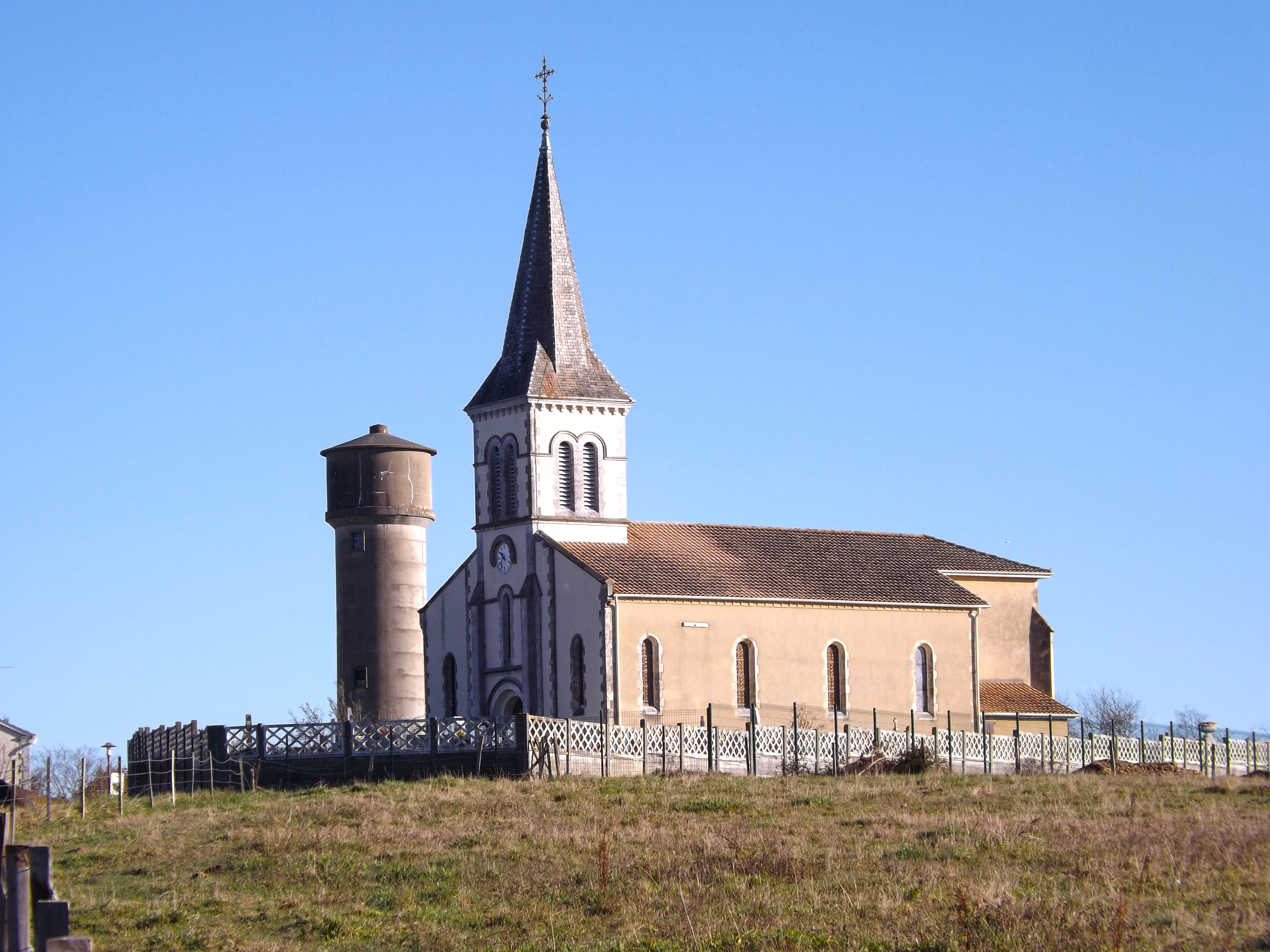
- Location of Castaignos-Souslens
- Location within France Location within Nouvelle-Aquitaine
- Coordinates: 43°35′14″N 0°38′59″W
- Country: France
- Region: Nouvelle-Aquitaine
- Department: Landes
- Arrondissement: Dax
- Canton: Coteau de Chalosse

Government
  - Mayor (2020–2026): Georges Lacave
- Area^{1}: 7.45 km^{2} (2.88 sq mi)
- Elevation: 144 m (472 ft)
- Highest elevation: 146 m (479 ft)
- Lowest elevation: 45 m (148 ft)
- Population (2023): 428
  - Density: 57.4/km^{2} (149/sq mi)
- Time zone: UTC+01:00 (CET)
  - Summer (DST): UTC+02:00 (CEST)
- INSEE/Postal code: 40069 /40700
- ^{1} French Land Register data, which excludes lakes, ponds, glaciers > 1 km^{2} (0.386 sq mi or 247 acres) and river estuaries.

Castaignos-Souslens is a commune in the Landes department in Nouvelle-Aquitaine in southwestern France.

== Population ==
Historical population
Year	Pop.	±% p.a.
1968	277	—
1975	276	−0.05%
1982	263	−0.69%
1990	316	+2.32%
1999	358	+1.40%
2007	353	−0.18%
2012	418	+3.44%
2017	394	−1.18%
2023	428	+1.39%
Source: INSEE

== See also ==
- Communes of the Landes department
