= Argelos, Landes =

Argelos
- Commune
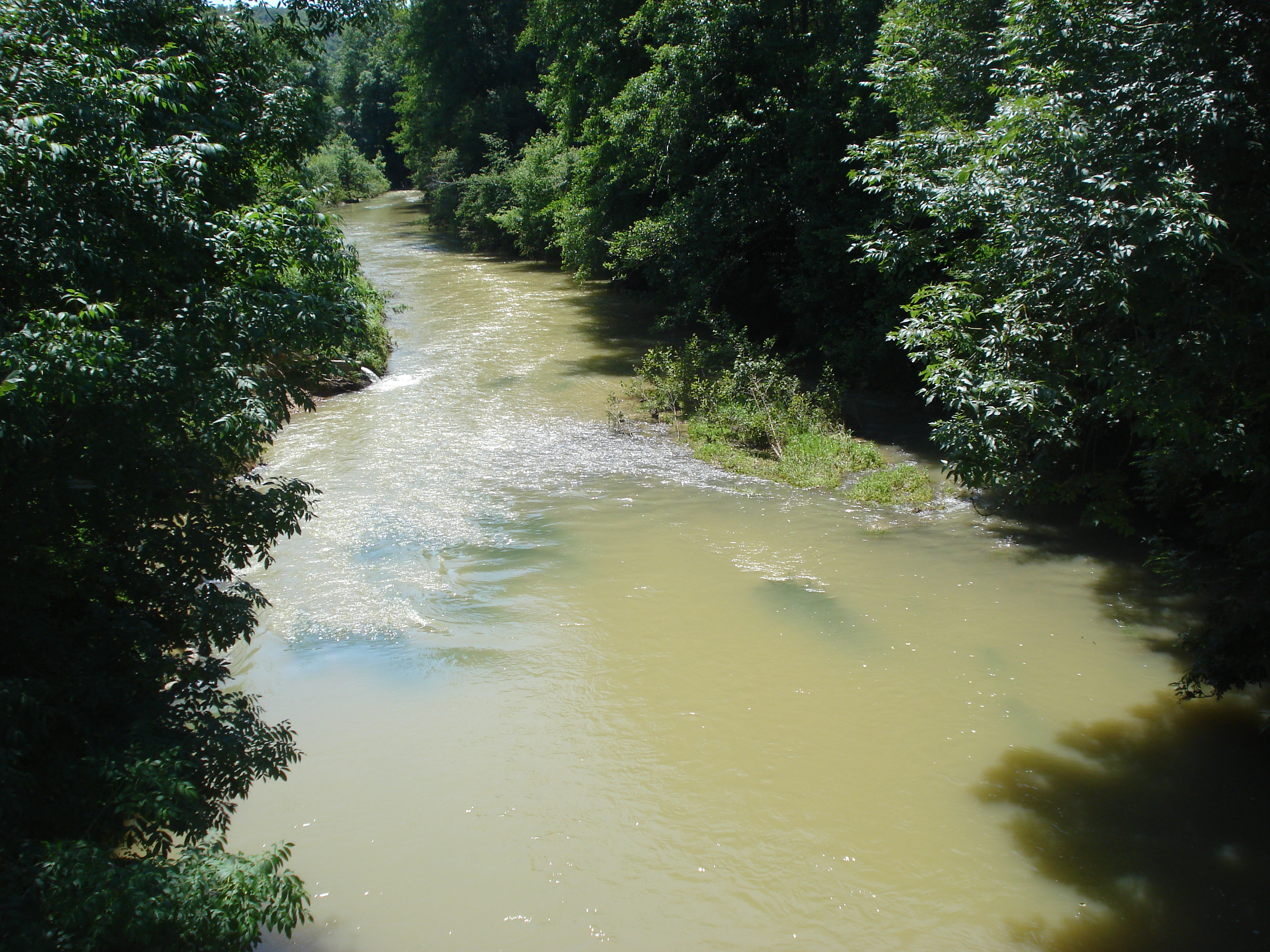
- The Luy de France between Momuy and Argelos
- Location of Argelos
- Location within France Location within Nouvelle-Aquitaine
- Coordinates: 43°35′01″N 0°37′41″W
- Country: France
- Region: Nouvelle-Aquitaine
- Department: Landes
- Arrondissement: Dax
- Canton: Coteau de Chalosse
- Intercommunality: CC Coteaux Vallées Luys

Government
  - Mayor (2020–2026): Fabienne Lassalle
- Area^{1}: 6.44 km^{2} (2.49 sq mi)
- Highest elevation: 157 m (515 ft)
- Lowest elevation: 48 m (157 ft)
- Population (2023): 160
  - Density: 25/km^{2} (64/sq mi)
- Time zone: UTC+01:00 (CET)
  - Summer (DST): UTC+02:00 (CEST)
- INSEE/Postal code: 40007 /40700
- ^{1} French Land Register data, which excludes lakes, ponds, glaciers > 1 km^{2} (0.386 sq mi or 247 acres) and river estuaries.

Argelos (Argelòs in Occitan) is a commune of the Landes department in Nouvelle-Aquitaine in southwestern France.

== Population ==
Historical population
Year	Pop.	±% p.a.
1968	216	—
1975	178	−2.73%
1982	159	−1.60%
1990	181	+1.63%
1999	173	−0.50%
2007	167	−0.44%
2012	187	+2.29%
2017	165	−2.47%
2023	160	−0.51%
Source: INSEE

== See also ==
- Communes of the Landes department
