= Viscounty of Orthe =

Feudal viscountcy in medieval and early modern Gascony

The Viscountcy of Orthe was a viscountcy in southwestern Gascony, located within the modern-day Landes department of France. Centered on Pays d'Orthe, the viscountcy existed from the early 11th century until its abolition during the French Revolution.

== Geography ==
The viscountcy occupied the strategic confluence of the Gave de Pau and the Gave d'Oloron, bordered by the Adour river to the west and Béarn to the south.

Map of Pays d'Orthe which displays borders of the viscountcy

The territory of the viscountcy once comprised eleven parishes: Orthevielle, Igaas, Lanne, Saint-Étienne-d'Orthe, Bélus, Orist, Saint-Lon, Pey, Siest, Cagnotte, and Cazorditte. In addition, the viscounts held the two neighboring hereditary baronies of Cauneille and Oeyregave.

The lands of the viscountcy were further subdivided into smaller fiefs known as caveries (caballus), denoting estates owing mounted military service to the viscount, including the caveries of Montgaillard in Orthevielle, Villenave in Bélus, and Loustau and Capdelie across Lanne and Orthevielle.

The fortress of the viscountcy was originally Château d'Aspremont and later moved to the new castle, later renamed Château de Montréal, along the banks of the Gaves réunis at Peyrehorade in the 16th century.

== History ==
The viscountcy was created in the early 11th century by Arnaud II, Viscount of Dax, for his second son, Garcie-Arnaud.

In the second half of the 12th century, Loup-Garcie II, Viscount of Orthe, made a strategic second marriage to Adelaide of Anjou, daughter of William FitzEmpress, niece of King Henry II of England, who ruled Gascony through his marriage to Eleanor of Aquitaine.

During the 14th century, the ruling house adopted the surname d'Aspremont (or d'Apremont), taking the name from their primary fortress, the Château d'Aspremont overlooking Peyrehorade. Throughout the Hundred Years' War, the viscounts navigated shifting allegiances between the Plantagenet dukes of Aquitaine and the French crown.

Adrien d'Aspremont (1509–1578), Viscount of Orthe, served as governor of Bayonne under King Charles IX of France during the French Wars of Religion.

Lucia Antoinette, daughter and heir of Antoni III Enric Melchior, Viscount of Orthe, married Jean, Count of Montréal and Troisvilles, Marquis of Moneins, Viscount of Tardets, Baron of Montory and Beyrie. After the French revolution in 1789, she emigrated to Spain.

== List of viscounts ==
- Garcie-Arnaud
- Loup-Garcie I
- Sanche-Loup
- Guillaume-Sanche
- Raymond-Sanche I
- Arnaud-Raymond I
- Guillaume-Raymond
- Loup-Garcie II
- Richard-Garcie (1237 – 1243)
- Loup-Raymond (1243 – 1244)
- Regency of Almodis of Cognac (1244–1254)
- Raymond-Loup (1254–1295)
- Arnaud-Loup (1295–1300)
- Raymond-Arnaud (1300–1322)
- Arnaud-Raymond IV (1322 – c. 1348)
- Arnaud-Raymond V (c. 1348 – 1363)
- Jean I d'Aspremont (1363–1409)
- Louis I (1409-1451)
- Louis II Arnaud (1451–1474).
- Pierre d'Aspremont (1474–1532)
- Adrien d'Aspremont (1532–1578)
- Jean II (1578–1618),
- Antoine I (1618–1658)
- Jean III (1658–1704)
- Dominic (1704-1716)
- Antoine II (1726–1759)
- Antoine III Henri Melchior d'Aspremont (1759–1772)
- Luce-Antoinette d'Aspremont, Viscountess (1772–1793), emigrated to Spain during the French Revolution and died in San Sebastián in 1798.
