= Misson =

Misson may refer to:

- Misson, Landes, a commune in the Landes department in France
- Misson, Nottinghamshire, a village in Nottinghamshire, England
- Frank Misson (1938–2024), Australian cricketer
- Maximilien Misson (c.1650–1722), a French writer and traveller
- Misson Wines, see Livermore Valley AVA
