= Canton of Orthe et Arrigans =

Coordinates: 43.55°N 1.10°W

The canton of Orthe et Arrigans is an administrative division of the Landes department, southwestern France. It was created at the French canton reorganisation which came into effect in March 2015. Its seat is in Peyrehorade.

It consists of the following communes:

1. Bélus
2. Cagnotte
3. Cauneille
4. Estibeaux
5. Gaas
6. Habas
7. Hastingues
8. Labatut
9. Mimbaste
10. Misson
11. Mouscardès
12. Oeyregave
13. Orist
14. Orthevielle
15. Ossages
16. Pey
17. Peyrehorade
18. Port-de-Lanne
19. Pouillon
20. Saint-Cricq-du-Gave
21. Saint-Étienne-d'Orthe
22. Saint-Lon-les-Mines
23. Sorde-l'Abbaye
24. Tilh
