= Labatut, Landes =

Labatut
- Commune
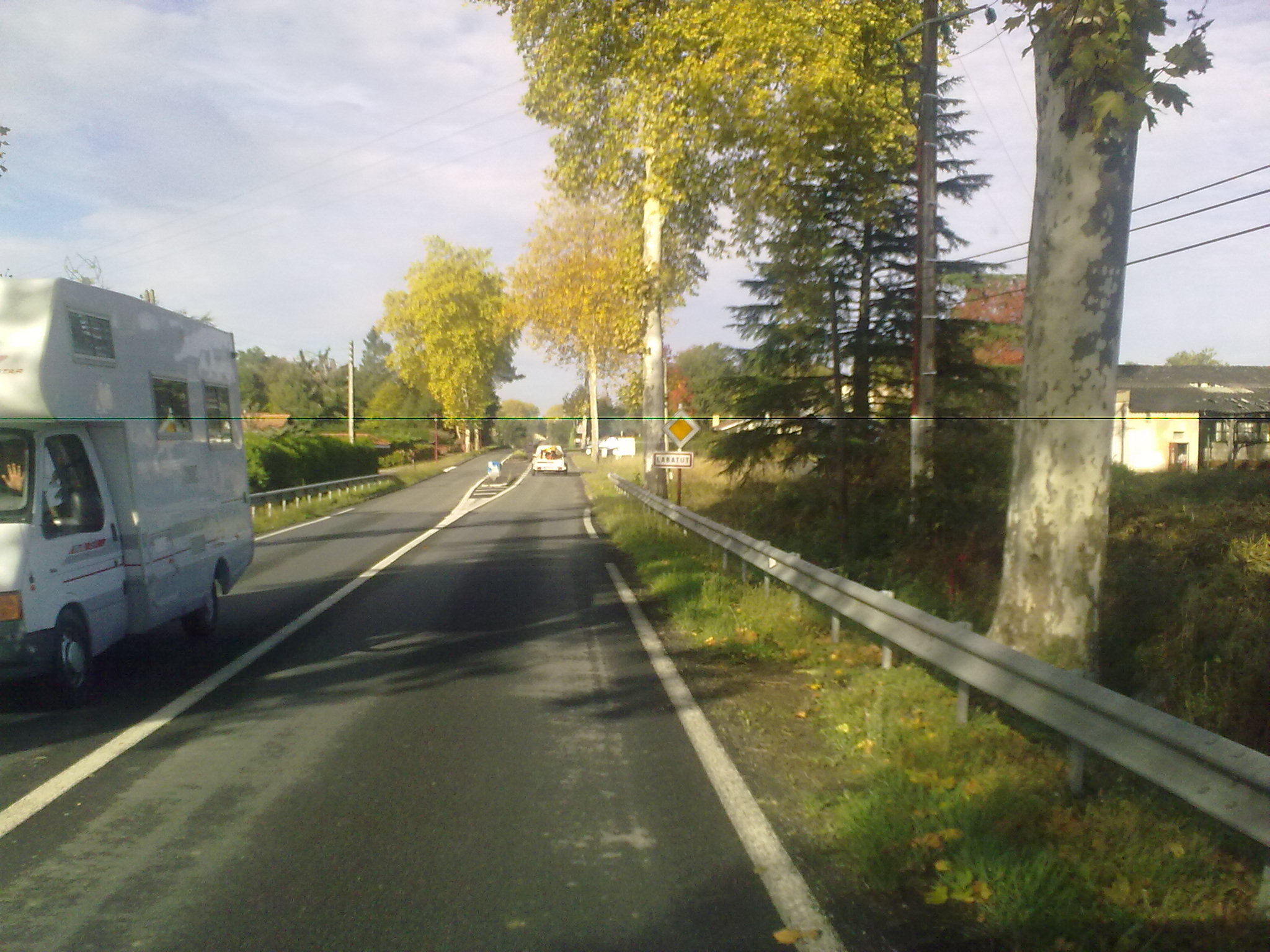
- The road into Labatut
- Location of Labatut
- Location within France Location within Nouvelle-Aquitaine
- Coordinates: 43°33′04″N 0°59′01″W
- Country: France
- Region: Nouvelle-Aquitaine
- Department: Landes
- Arrondissement: Dax
- Canton: Orthe et Arrigans

Government
  - Mayor (2020–2026): Bernard Dupont
- Area^{1}: 20.95 km^{2} (8.09 sq mi)
- Elevation: 46 m (151 ft)
- Highest elevation: 125 m (410 ft)
- Lowest elevation: 5 m (16 ft)
- Population (2023): 1,430
  - Density: 68.3/km^{2} (177/sq mi)
- Time zone: UTC+01:00 (CET)
  - Summer (DST): UTC+02:00 (CEST)
- INSEE/Postal code: 40132 /40300
- ^{1} French Land Register data, which excludes lakes, ponds, glaciers > 1 km^{2} (0.386 sq mi or 247 acres) and river estuaries.

Labatut (French pronunciation: [labaty]) is a commune in the Landes department in Nouvelle-Aquitaine in south-western France.

== See also ==
- Communes of the Landes department
