= Ossages =

- Commune
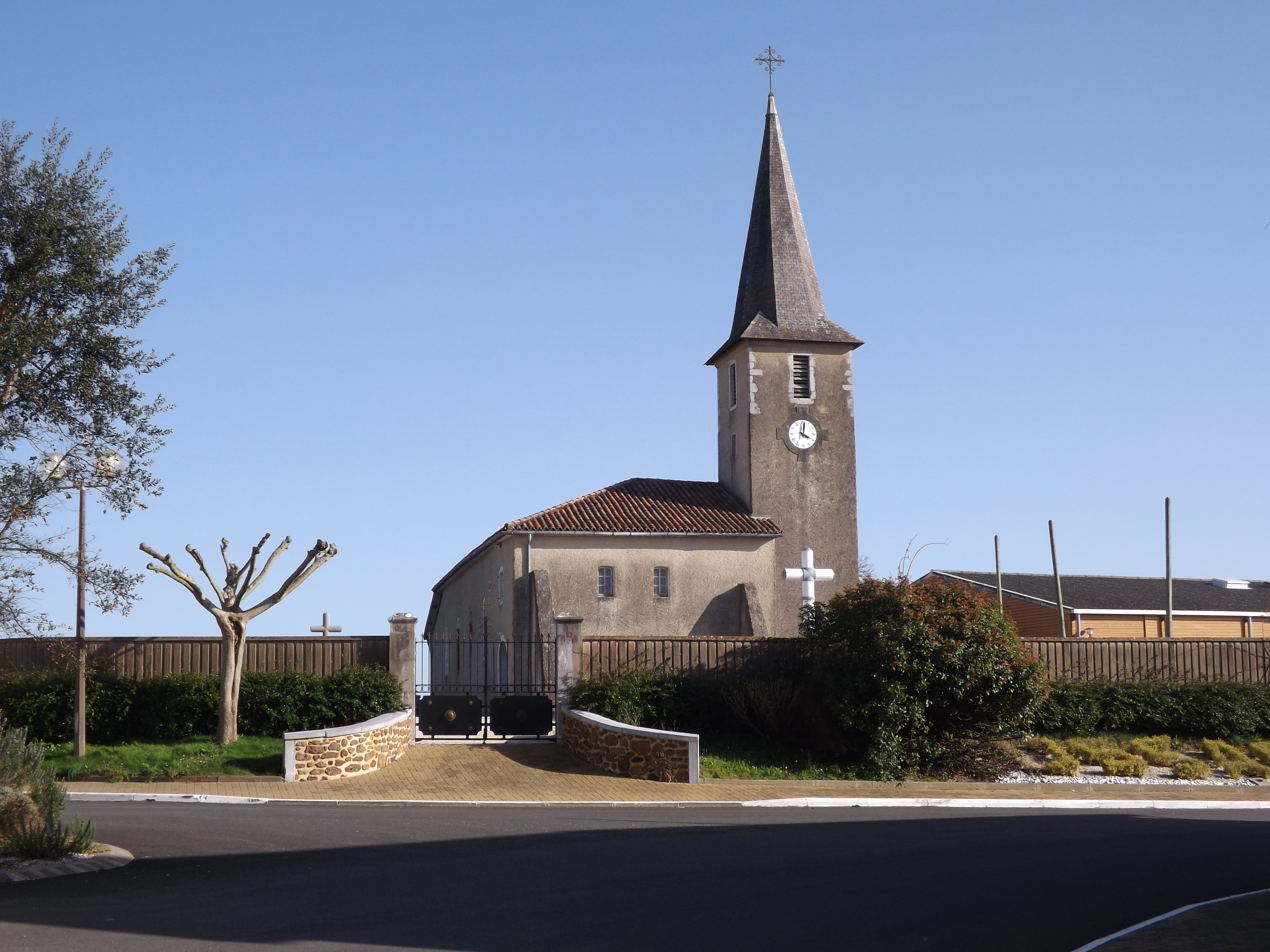
- Location of Ossages
- Location within France Location within Nouvelle-Aquitaine
- Coordinates: 43°33′31″N 0°52′49″W
- Country: France
- Region: Nouvelle-Aquitaine
- Department: Landes
- Arrondissement: Dax
- Canton: Orthe et Arrigans

Government
  - Mayor (2020–2026): Thierry Caloone
- Area^{1}: 14.31 km^{2} (5.53 sq mi)
- Highest elevation: 148 m (486 ft)
- Lowest elevation: 43 m (141 ft)
- Population (2023): 492
  - Density: 34.4/km^{2} (89.0/sq mi)
- Time zone: UTC+01:00 (CET)
  - Summer (DST): UTC+02:00 (CEST)
- INSEE/Postal code: 40214 /40290
- ^{1} French Land Register data, which excludes lakes, ponds, glaciers > 1 km^{2} (0.386 sq mi or 247 acres) and river estuaries.

Ossages (French pronunciation: [ɔsaʒ]; Occitan: Ossadjas) is a commune in the Landes department in Nouvelle-Aquitaine in southwestern France.

== Population ==
Historical population
Year	Pop.	±% p.a.
1968	520	—
1975	453	−1.95%
1982	423	−0.97%
1990	386	−1.14%
1999	423	+1.02%
2007	454	+0.89%
2012	484	+1.29%
2017	504	+0.81%
2023	492	−0.40%
Source: INSEE

== See also ==
- Communes of the Landes department
