= Habas, Landes =

Habas
- Commune
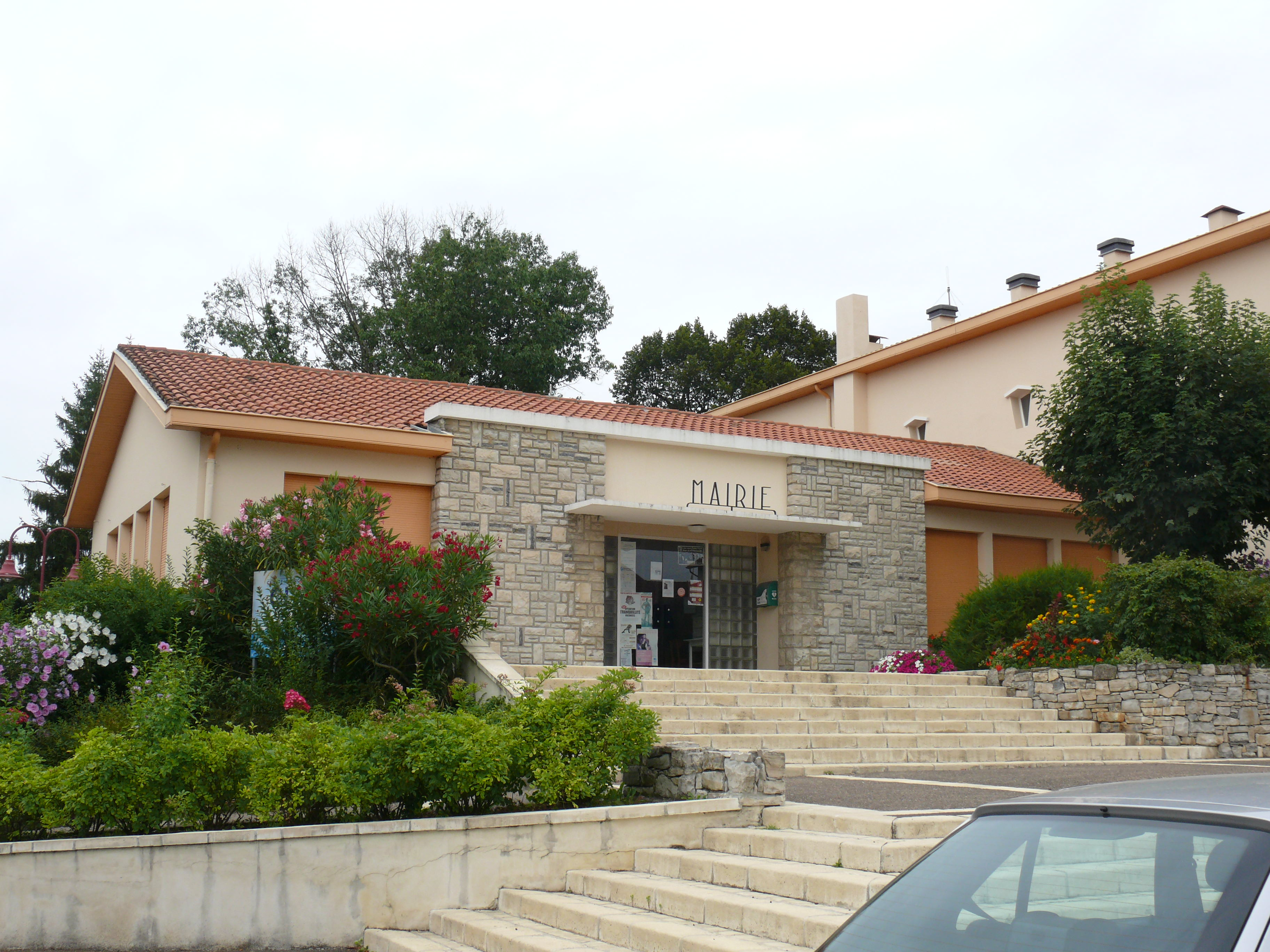
- Town hall

- Coat of arms
- Location of Habas
- Location within France Location within Nouvelle-Aquitaine
- Coordinates: 43°34′21″N 0°55′42″W
- Country: France
- Region: Nouvelle-Aquitaine
- Department: Landes
- Arrondissement: Dax
- Canton: Orthe et Arrigans
- Intercommunality: Pays d'Orthe et Arrigans

Government
  - Mayor (2020–2026): Jean-François Lataste
- Area^{1}: 18.75 km^{2} (7.24 sq mi)
- Elevation: 105 m (344 ft)
- Highest elevation: 123 m (404 ft)
- Lowest elevation: 14 m (46 ft)
- Population (2023): 1,489
  - Density: 79.41/km^{2} (205.7/sq mi)
- Time zone: UTC+01:00 (CET)
  - Summer (DST): UTC+02:00 (CEST)
- INSEE/Postal code: 40118 /40290
- ^{1} French Land Register data, which excludes lakes, ponds, glaciers > 1 km^{2} (0.386 sq mi or 247 acres) and river estuaries.

Habas (French pronunciation: [abas]; Occitan: Havars) is a commune in the Landes department in Nouvelle-Aquitaine in southwestern France.

== Population ==
Historical population
Year	Pop.	±% p.a.
1968	1,425	—
1975	1,350	−0.77%
1982	1,290	−0.65%
1990	1,310	+0.19%
1999	1,311	+0.01%
2007	1,490	+1.61%
2012	1,462	−0.38%
2017	1,503	+0.55%
2023	1,489	−0.16%
Source: INSEE

== See also ==
- Communes of the Landes department
