= Pey, Landes =

Pey
- Commune
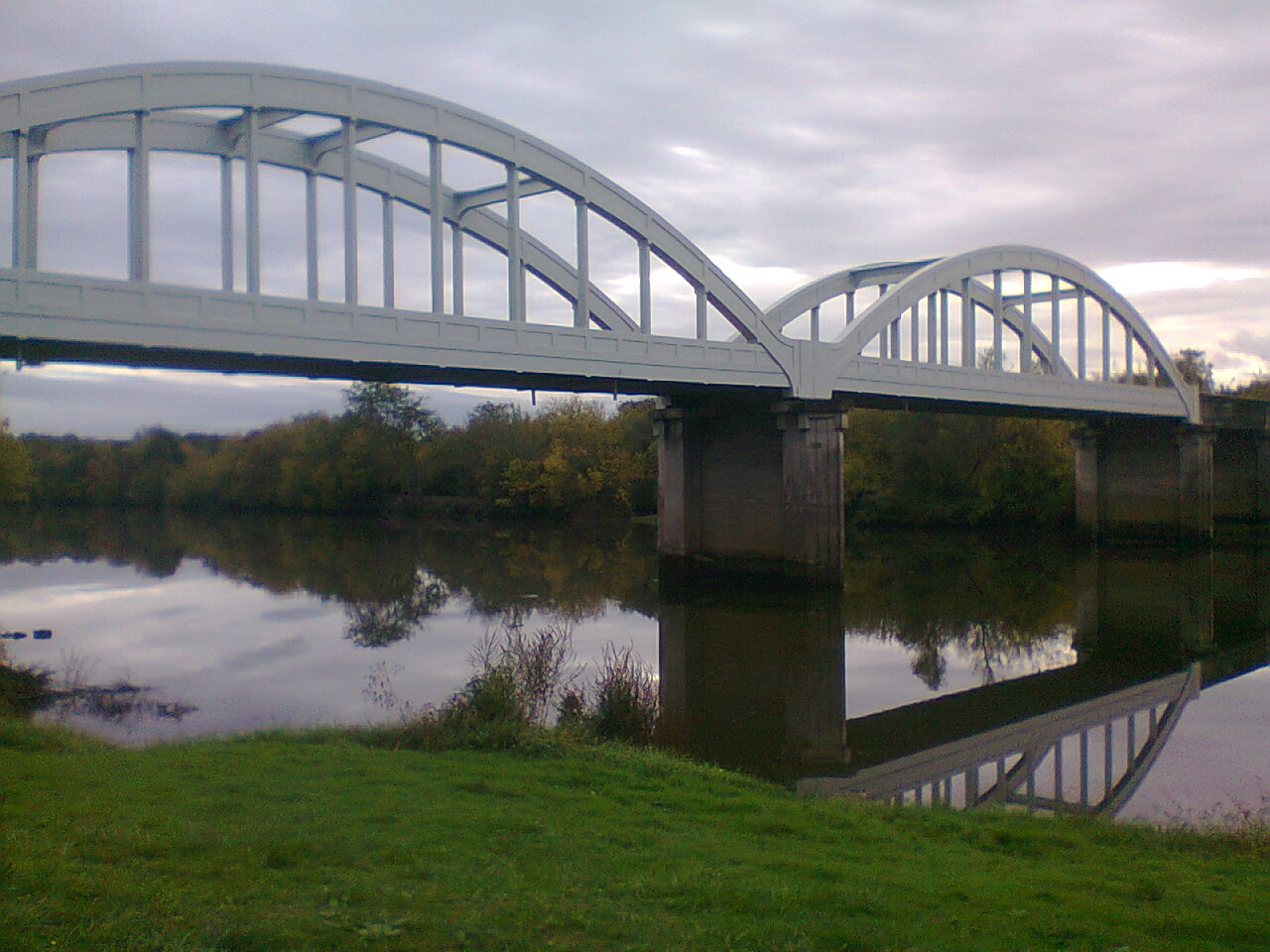
- La Marquèze Bridge between Josse and Pey
- Location of Pey
- Location within France Location within Nouvelle-Aquitaine
- Coordinates: 43°37′55″N 1°12′02″W
- Country: France
- Region: Nouvelle-Aquitaine
- Department: Landes
- Arrondissement: Dax
- Canton: Orthe et Arrigans

Government
  - Mayor (2020–2026): Roland Ducamp
- Area^{1}: 13.85 km^{2} (5.35 sq mi)
- Elevation: 30 m (98 ft)
- Highest elevation: 57 m (187 ft)
- Lowest elevation: 2 m (6.6 ft)
- Population (2023): 838
  - Density: 60.5/km^{2} (157/sq mi)
- Time zone: UTC+01:00 (CET)
  - Summer (DST): UTC+02:00 (CEST)
- INSEE/Postal code: 40222 /40300
- ^{1} French Land Register data, which excludes lakes, ponds, glaciers > 1 km^{2} (0.386 sq mi or 247 acres) and river estuaries.

Pey is a commune in the Landes department in Nouvelle-Aquitaine in southwestern France.

== Population ==
Historical population
Year	Pop.	±% p.a.
1968	609	—
1975	575	−0.82%
1982	563	−0.30%
1990	564	+0.02%
1999	544	−0.40%
2007	661	+2.46%
2012	700	+1.15%
2017	676	−0.70%
2023	838	+3.65%
Source: INSEE

== See also ==
- Communes of the Landes department
