= Sorde-l'Abbaye =

- Commune
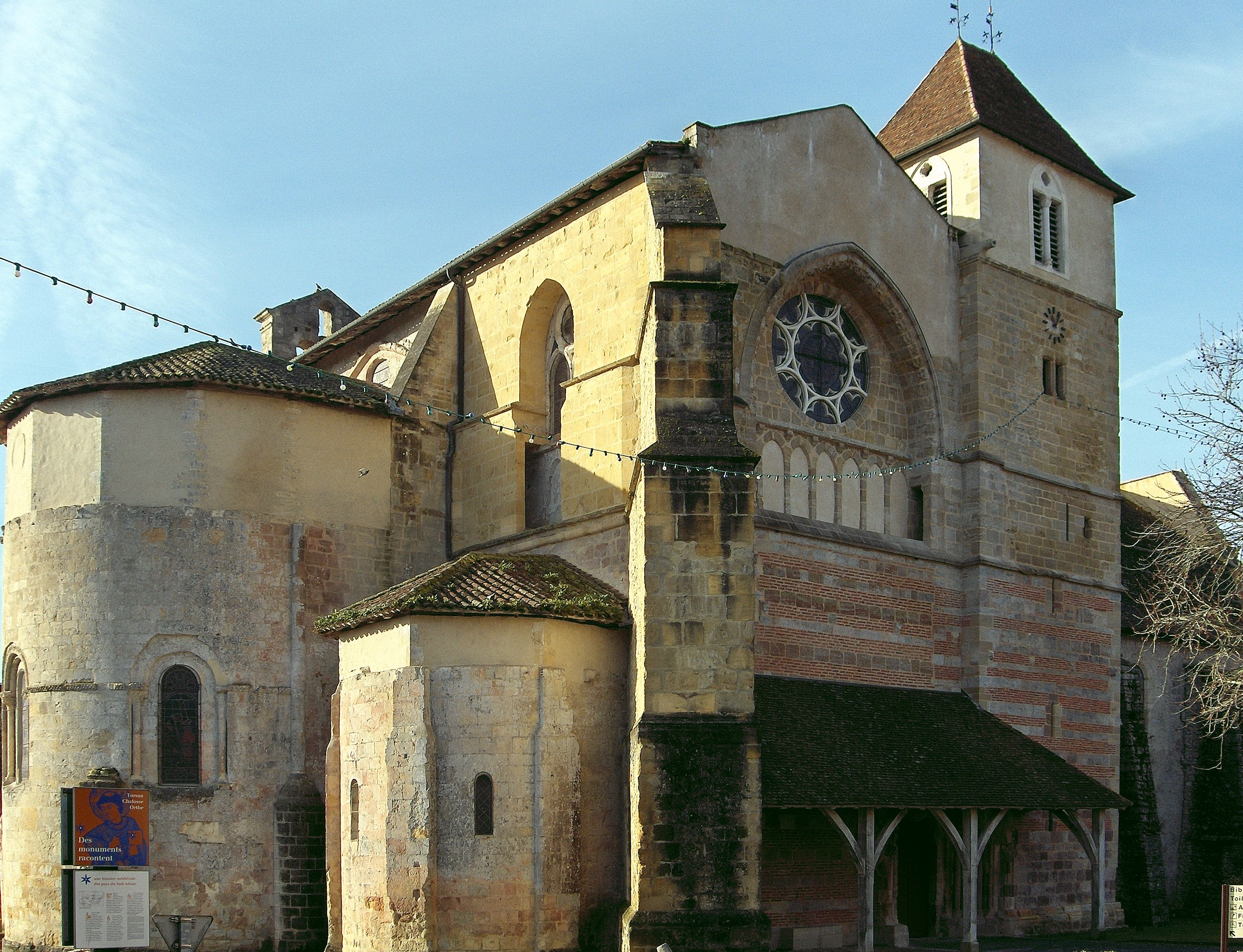
- Abbey of Saint-Jean de Sorde

- Coat of arms
- Location of Sorde-l'Abbaye
- Location within France Location within Nouvelle-Aquitaine
- Coordinates: 43°31′47″N 1°03′10″W
- Country: France
- Region: Nouvelle-Aquitaine
- Department: Landes
- Arrondissement: Dax
- Canton: Orthe et Arrigans
- Intercommunality: Pays d'Orthe et Arrigans

Government
  - Mayor (2020–2026): Marie-Françoise Laborde
- Area^{1}: 16.34 km^{2} (6.31 sq mi)
- Elevation: 8 m (26 ft)
- Highest elevation: 135 m (443 ft)
- Lowest elevation: 2 m (6.6 ft)
- Population (2023): 645
  - Density: 39.5/km^{2} (102/sq mi)
- Time zone: UTC+01:00 (CET)
  - Summer (DST): UTC+02:00 (CEST)
- INSEE/Postal code: 40306 /40300
- ^{1} French Land Register data, which excludes lakes, ponds, glaciers > 1 km^{2} (0.386 sq mi or 247 acres) and river estuaries.

Sorde-l'Abbaye (French pronunciation: [sɔʁd labei]; Occitan: Sòrda l'Abadia) is a commune, in the department of Landes and the region of Nouvelle-Aquitaine in southwestern France.

== Geography ==
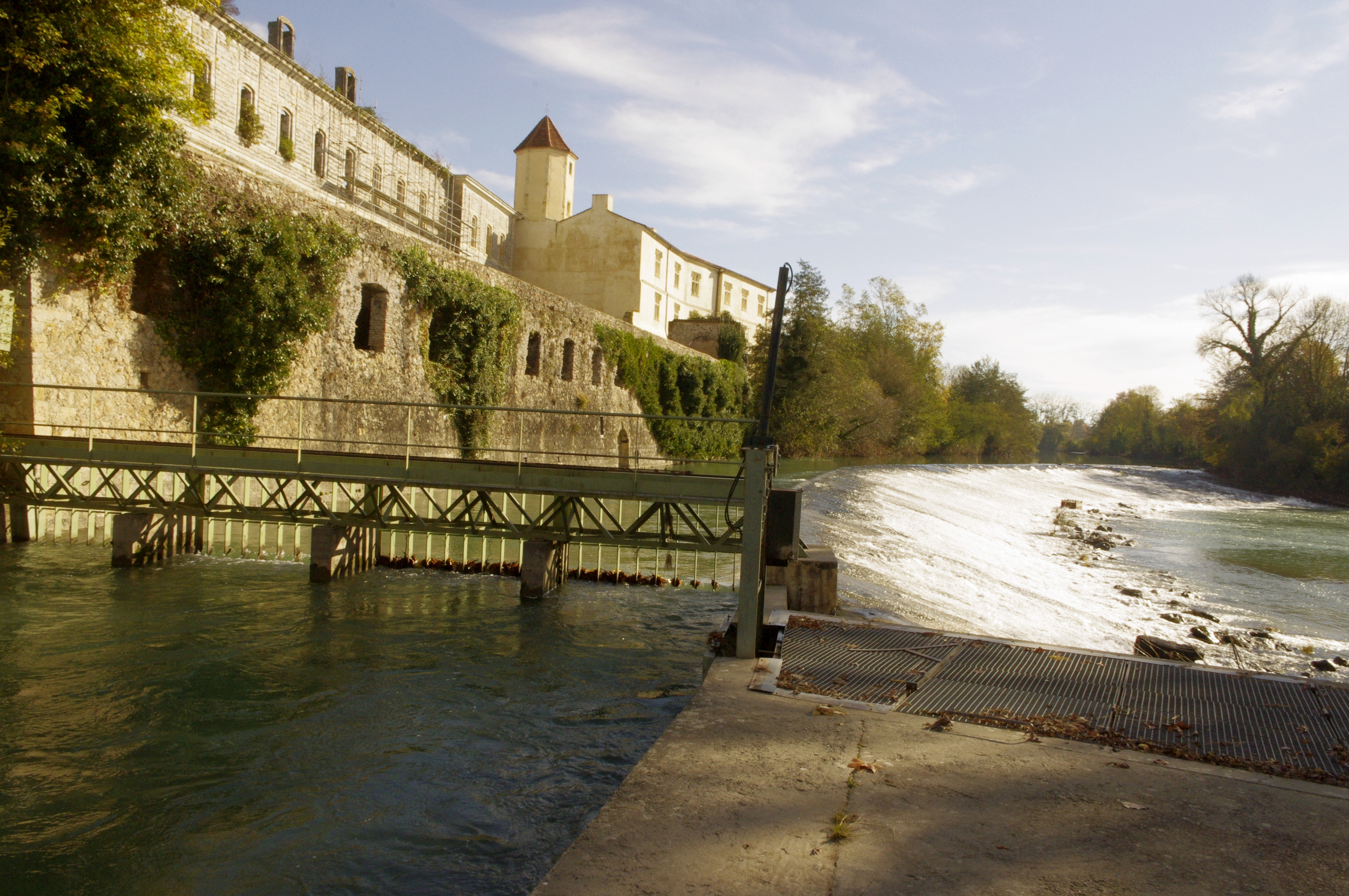
The gave d'Oloron river from the hydroelectric plant

The commune is situated on the edge of the Pays d'Orthe, a territory which was once under the control of the vicomté de Gascogne. These lands are irrigated by the gave d'Oloron river, which is a tributary of the gave de Pau. In 1920, a hydroelectric plant was built on this river, on the site of a mill belonging to the abbey.

== History ==
Situated on the via Turonensis, an ancient road between Landes and Pyrénées, Sorde l'Abbaye was visited from the Upper Paleolithic and experienced a revival in the Middle Ages as a result of pilgrimage to Compostella.

The site of Barat-de-Vin (in Gascon, "barat de bi") not far from the village, has been a thoroughfare for at least two thousand years, and was inhabited by ancient man who would have been attracted by the fertility of the Adour river valley.

Prehistoric remains of the Upper Paleolithic period have been recovered at nearby Duruthy cave, which was classified as a historic monument on 13 April 1962.

At the foot of a cliff on this site, several prehistoric deposits yielded remarkable artefacts of the Magdalenian period. On top of the cliff there was a protohistorical oppidum called Larroque. excavations along the Roman road leading to Spain via the Col de Cize also revealed a Gallo-Roman villa decorated with mosaics.

In Béarn and Bigorre, ancient names for the local area, the rivers were small streams which had their source in the Pyrenees mountains. In Antiquity, they supplied water to the Roman baths, and in the Middle Ages were used to power water mills and for salmon trapping.

In the area around Sorde, there are several places where the two rivers can be crossed by boat. The toponymy of some houses, today named "Passager" or "Passage", identifies these sites, as do the placenames "l'Hôpital" or "l'Espitaou", which indicate that pilgrims once stayed there overnight. Boats were not always necessary, however. There is also a ford which is easy to cross, except during the thaw in Spring. At the end of the 12th century, Richard the Lionheart apparently ended the practice of robbing pilgrims at this place.

However much the river was a problem for pilgrims, it was also an economic asset for local inhabitants. The water was exploited with watermills as well as salmon traps, or "baros", which were devised by monks and trap the fish by repelling the current. These remained in use until 1923. The salmon were a major source of revenue for the abbey, which was able to catch up to a hundredweight per year.

== Population ==
Historical population
Year	Pop.	±% p.a.
1968	637	—
1975	616	−0.48%
1982	572	−1.05%
1990	569	−0.07%
1999	535	−0.68%
2007	641	+2.29%
2012	658	+0.52%
2017	631	−0.83%
2023	645	+0.37%
Source: INSEE

== Sights ==
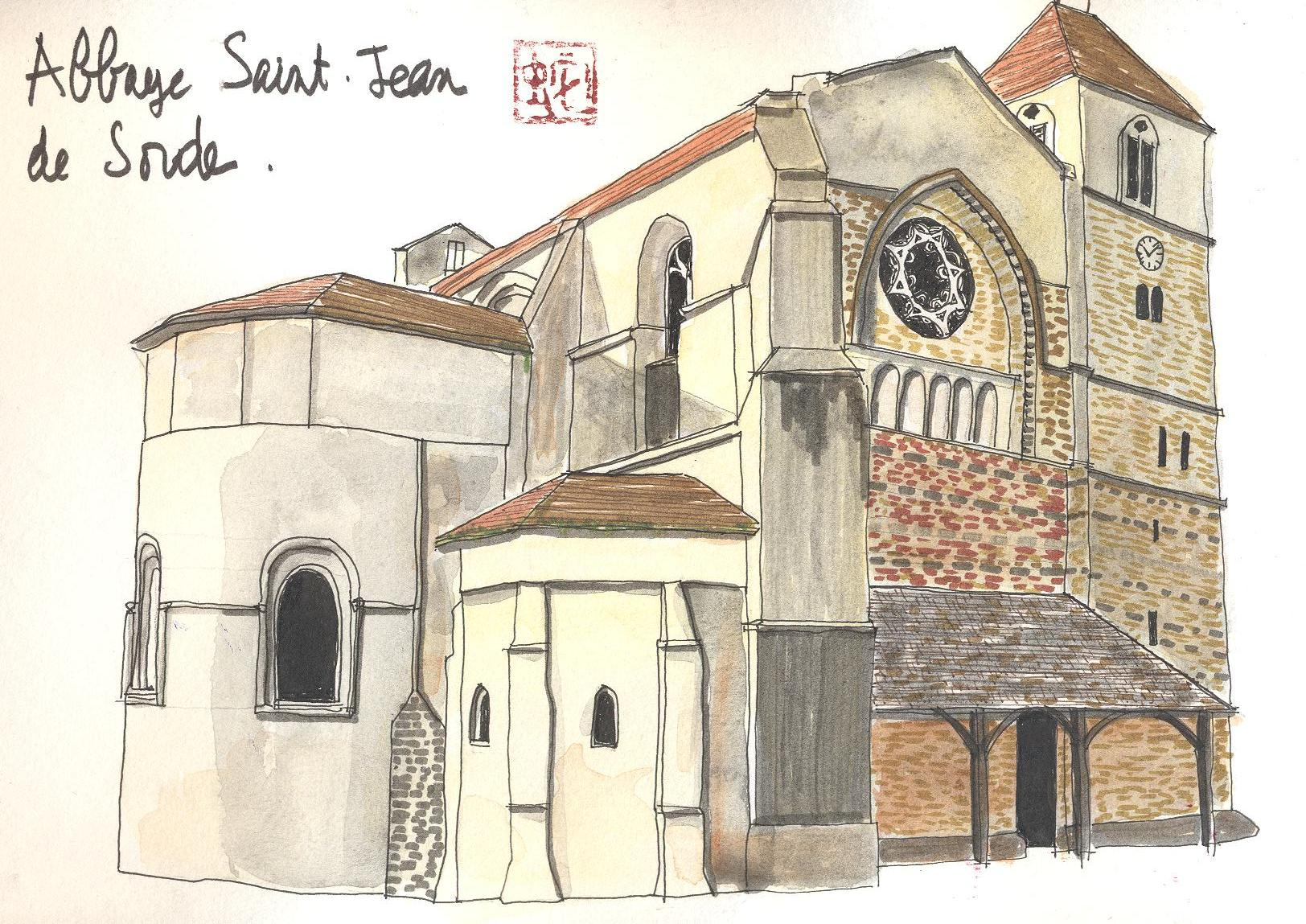
Watercolour of the abbey of Saint-Jean.

The Gallo-Roman mosaics of Sorde are found at the abbot's house of the abbey of St John, which is behind the church. Some fragments were found around 1870 but most were discovered starting in 1957, particularly during excavations which took places from 1958 to 1966. All the mosaics are registered as historic monuments.

These marble mosaics were part of a Gallo-Roman villa which was probably constructed in the 3rd century. There is no remaining trace of the villa walls in the courtyard of the abbot's house, but the interior of the caldarium and frigidarium of the villa baths can be seen. Graves were dug into the mosaics by post-Roman inhabitants.

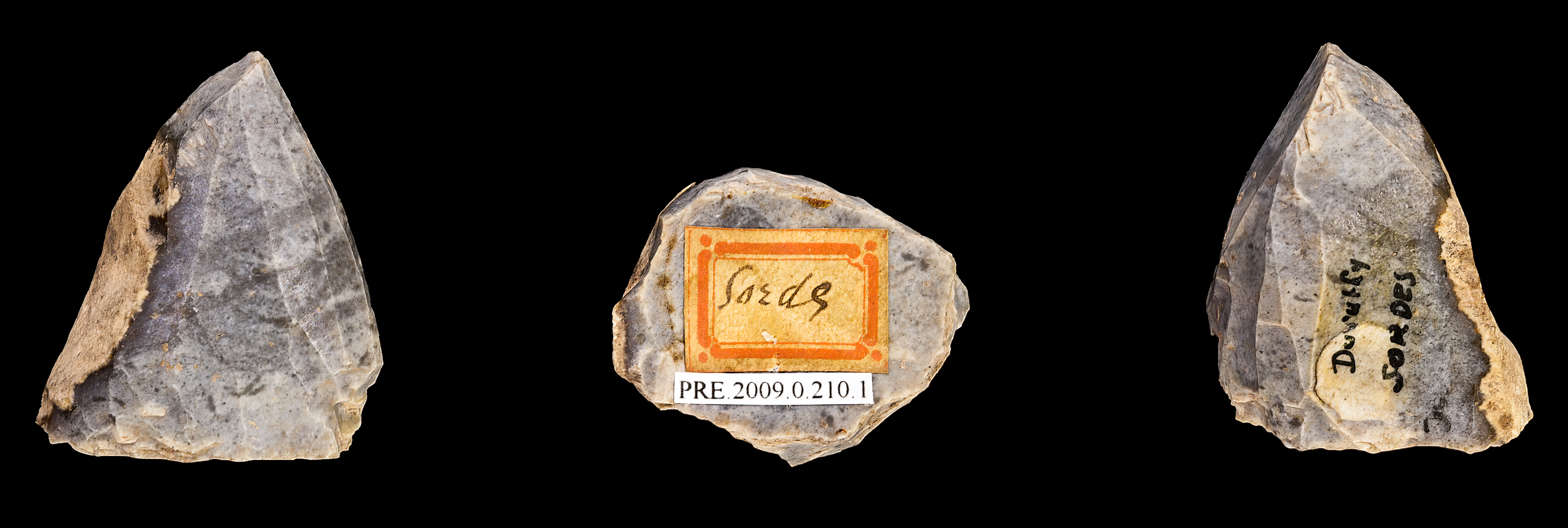
Prehistoric flint core – Upper Paleolithic

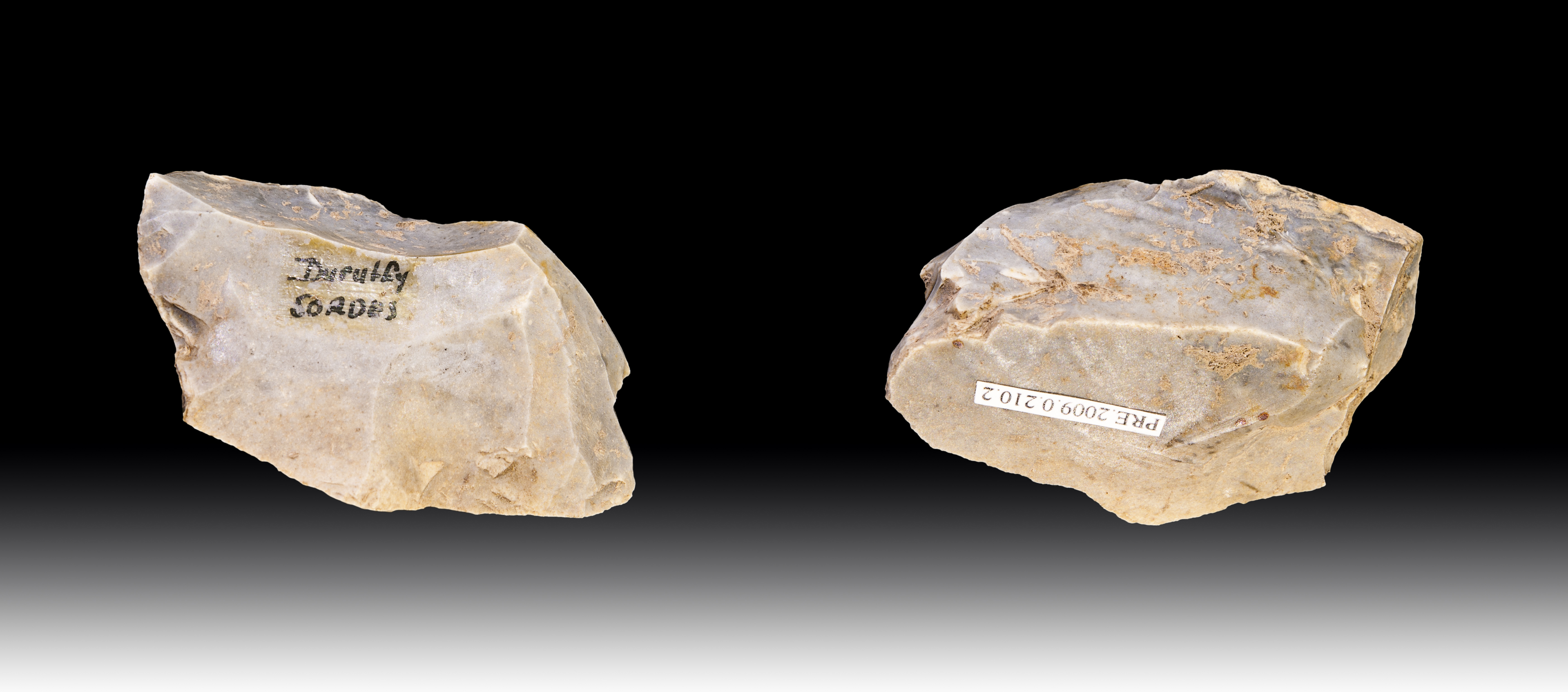
Prehistoric flint core – Upper Paleolithic

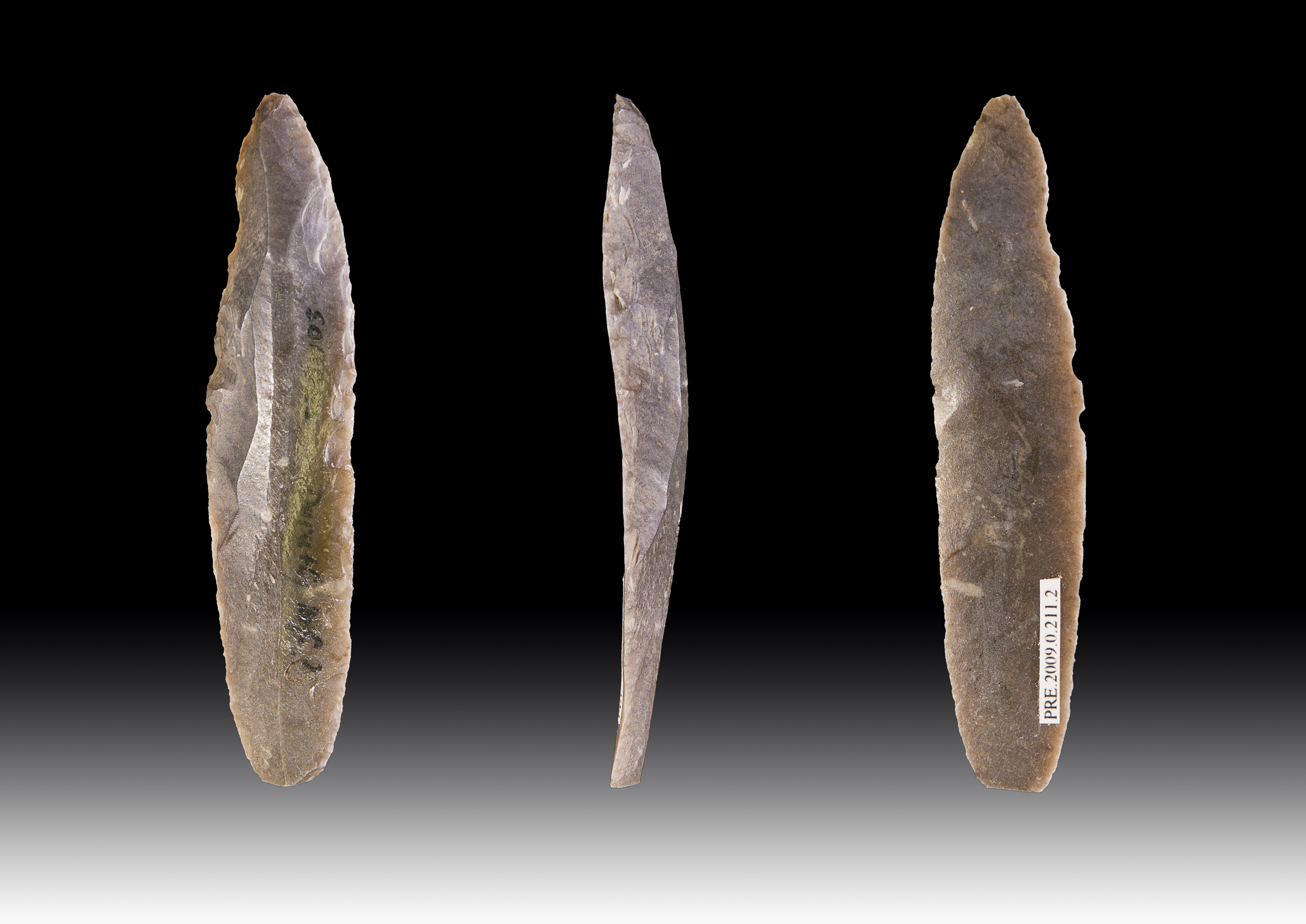
Re-worked flint blade (archaeology) – Upper Paleolithic

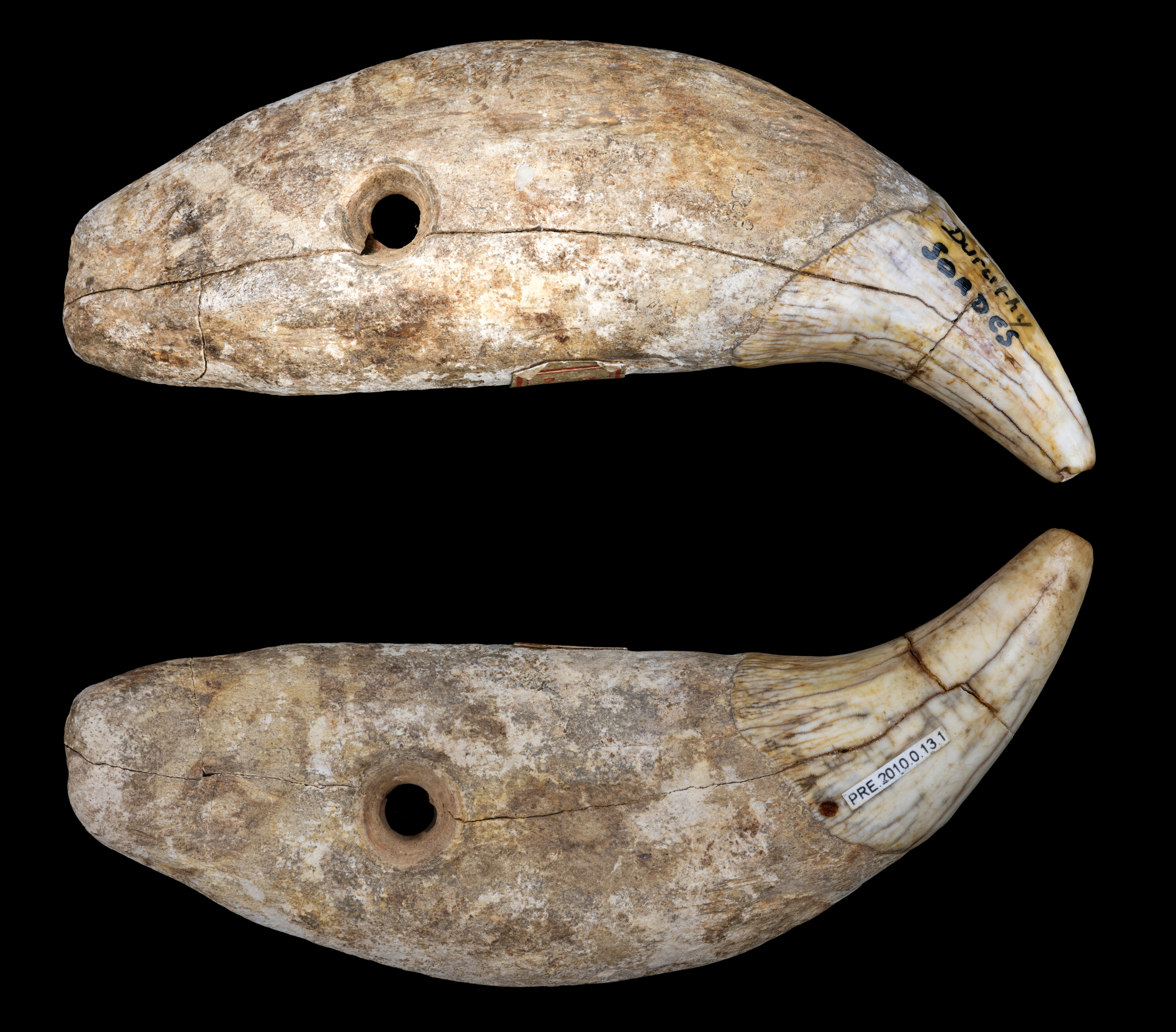
Pierced bear tooth

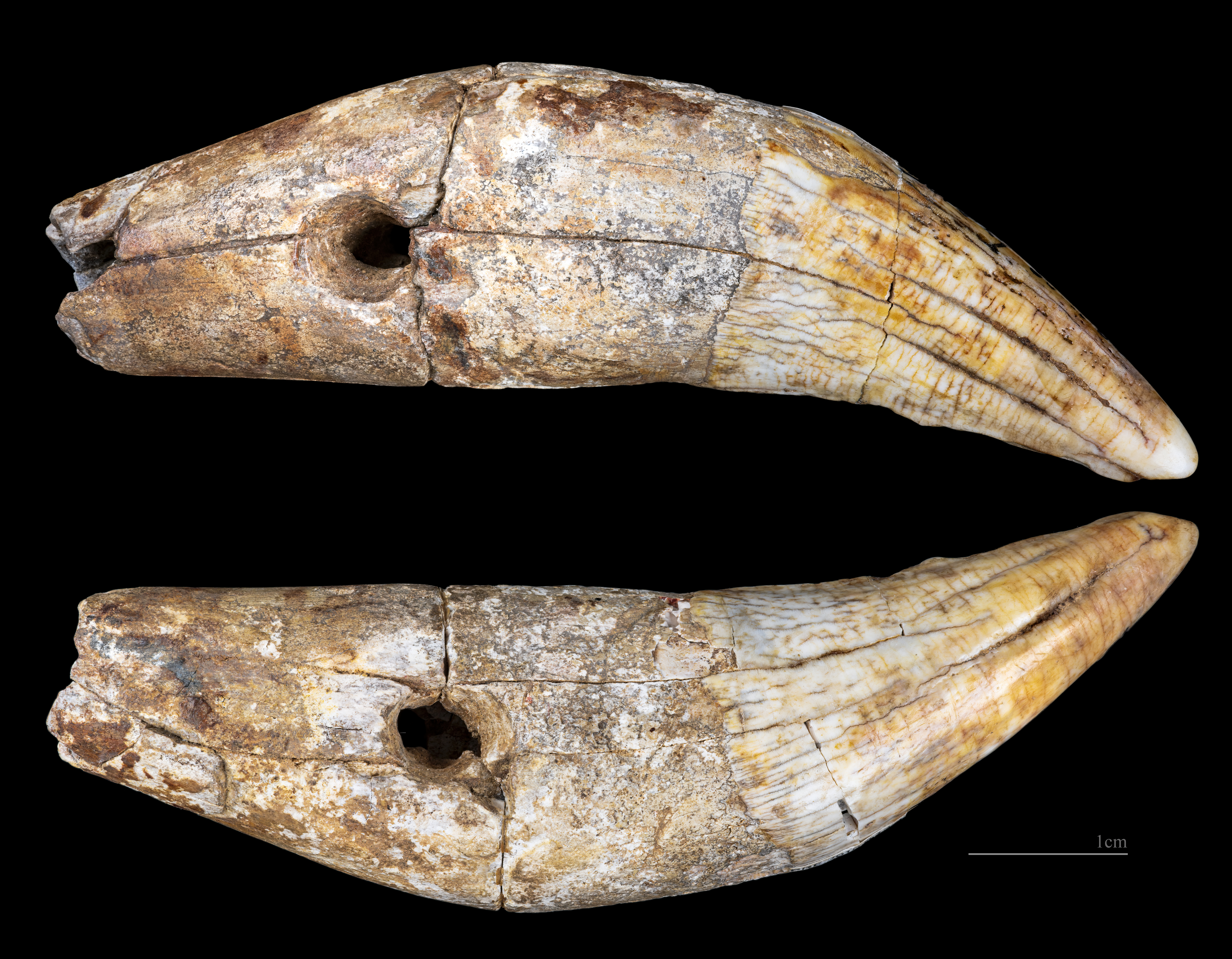
Pierced lion tooth

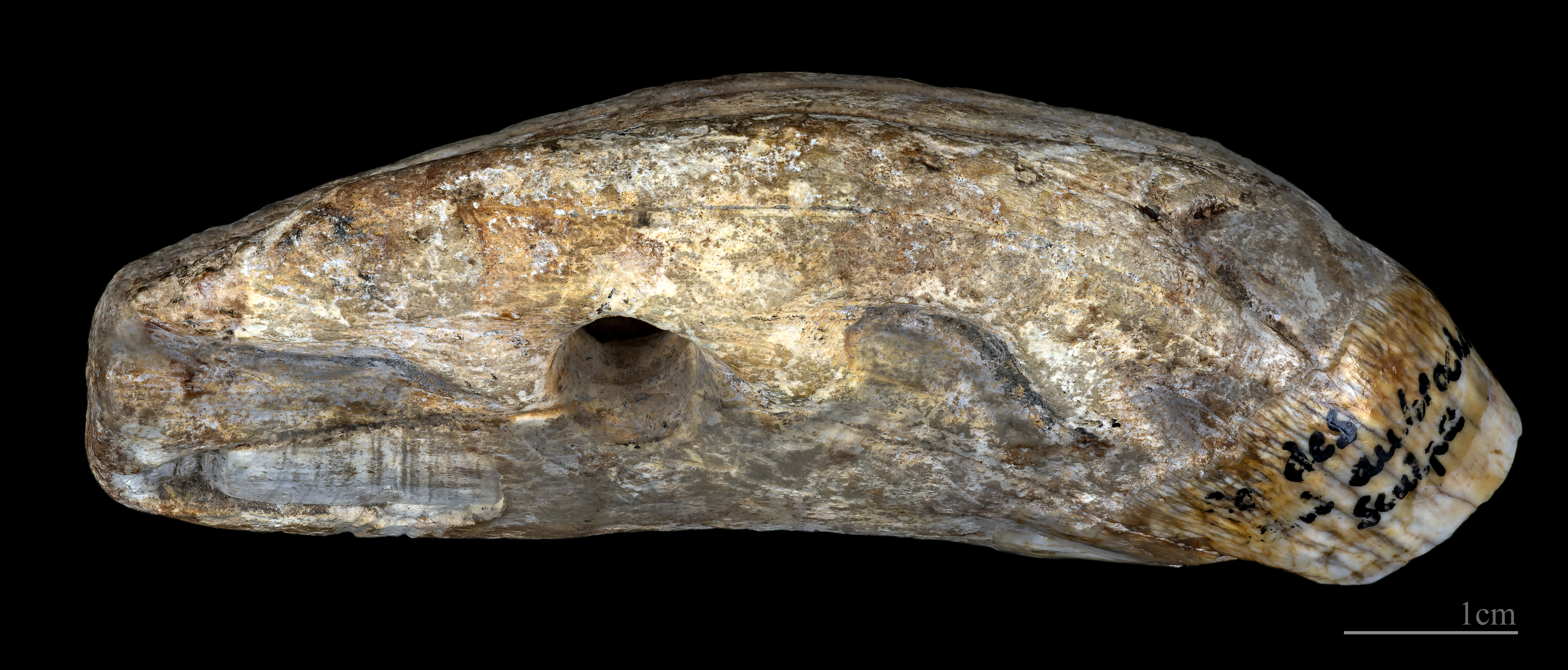
Cave bear canine pierced and engraved with a representation of pike.

== See also ==
- Communes of the Landes department
