= Mouscardès =

- Commune
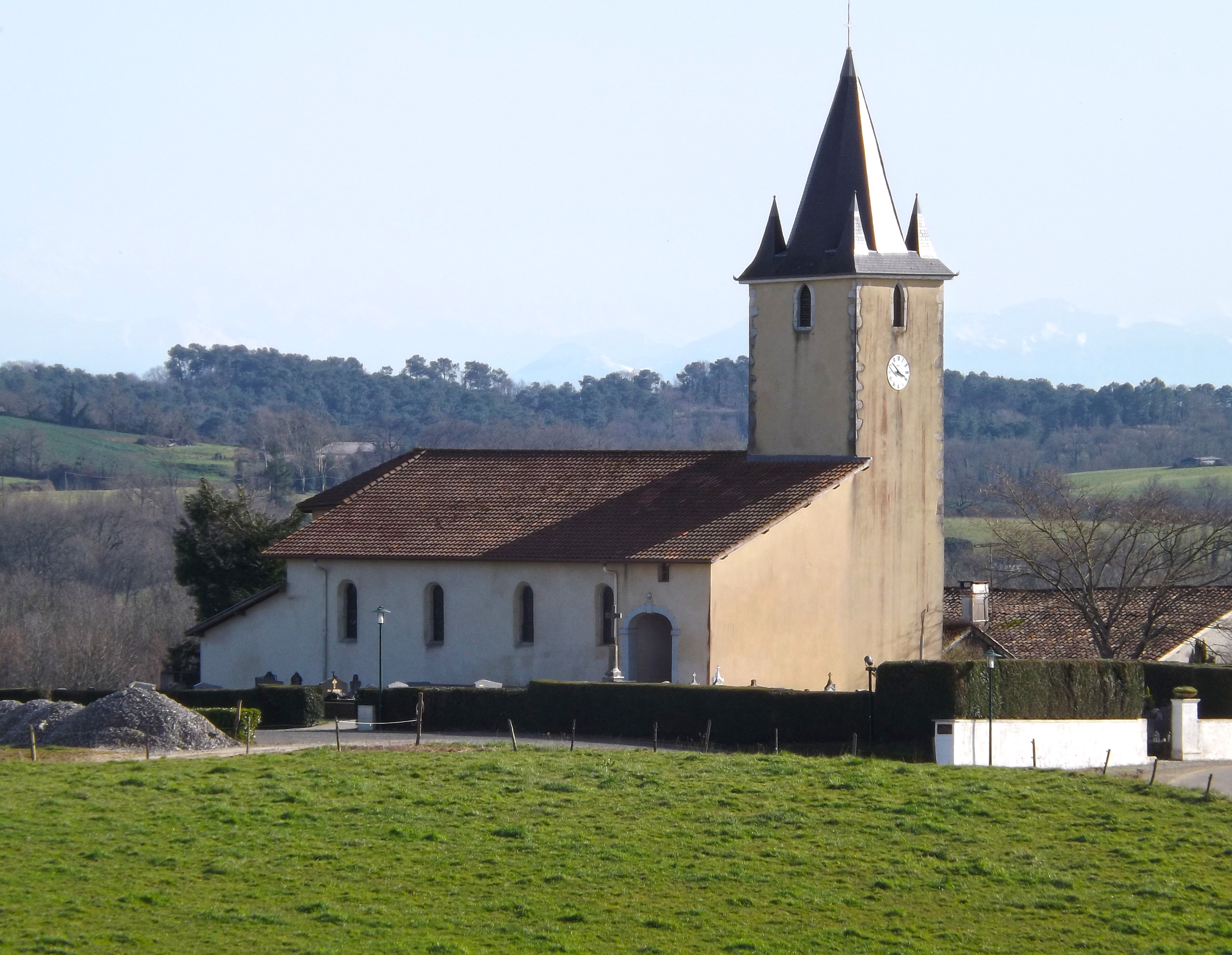
- Location of Mouscardès
- Location within France Location within Nouvelle-Aquitaine
- Coordinates: 43°35′02″N 0°52′46″W
- Country: France
- Region: Nouvelle-Aquitaine
- Department: Landes
- Arrondissement: Dax
- Canton: Orthe et Arrigans

Government
  - Mayor (2020–2026): Véronique Gomès
- Area^{1}: 9.14 km^{2} (3.53 sq mi)
- Highest elevation: 125 m (410 ft)
- Lowest elevation: 45 m (148 ft)
- Population (2023): 265
  - Density: 29.0/km^{2} (75.1/sq mi)
- Time zone: UTC+01:00 (CET)
  - Summer (DST): UTC+02:00 (CEST)
- INSEE/Postal code: 40199 /40290
- ^{1} French Land Register data, which excludes lakes, ponds, glaciers > 1 km^{2} (0.386 sq mi or 247 acres) and river estuaries.

Mouscardès (French pronunciation: [muskaʁdɛs]; Occitan: Moscardés) is a commune in the Landes department in Nouvelle-Aquitaine in southwestern France.

== Population ==
Historical population
Year	Pop.	±% p.a.
1968	244	—
1975	239	−0.30%
1982	224	−0.92%
1990	218	−0.34%
1999	230	+0.60%
2007	270	+2.02%
2012	245	−1.92%
2017	268	+1.81%
2023	265	−0.19%
Source: INSEE

== See also ==
- Communes of the Landes department
