= Tilh =

- Commune
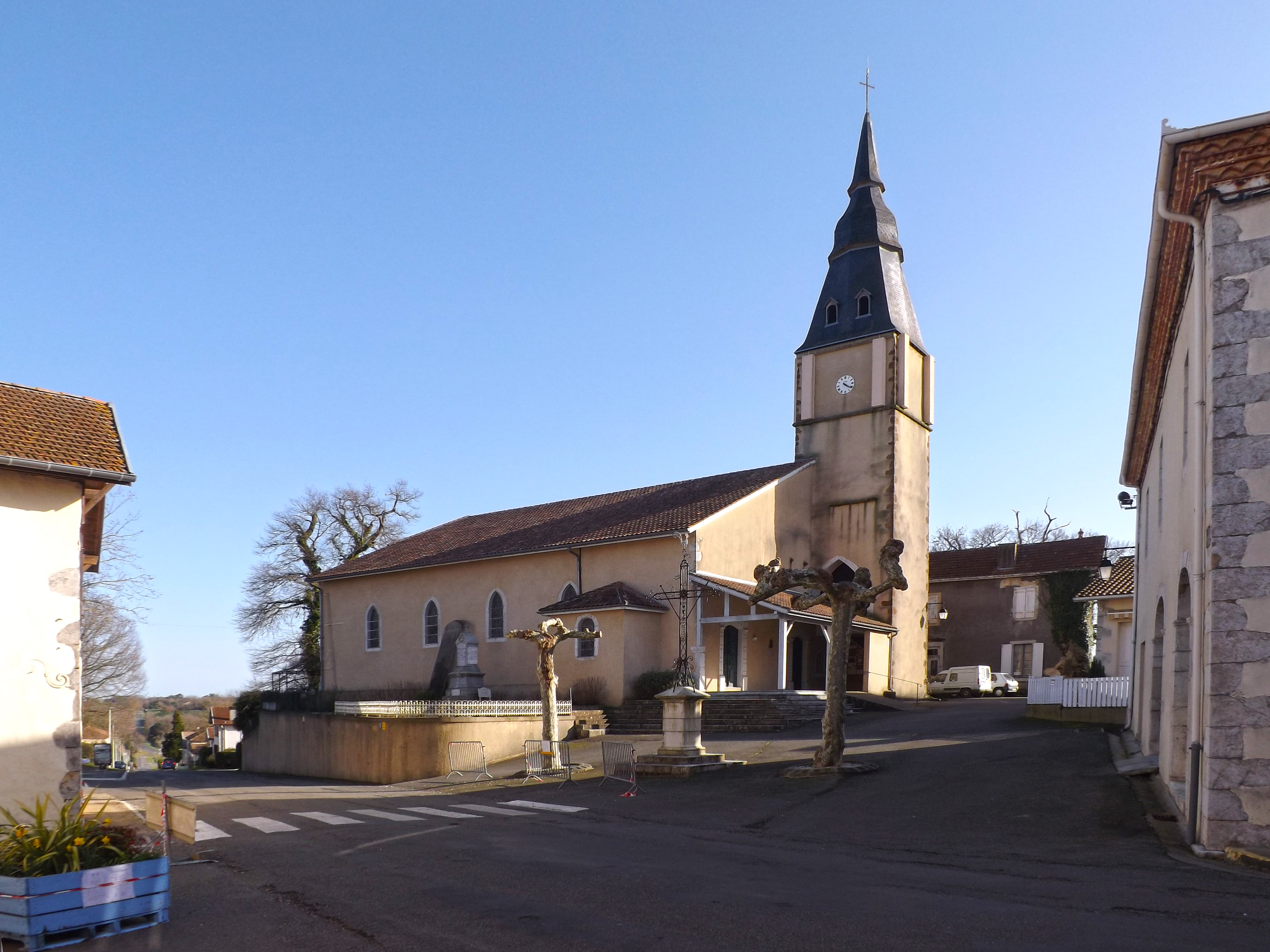
- Location of Tilh
- Location within France Location within Nouvelle-Aquitaine
- Coordinates: 43°34′34″N 0°50′02″W
- Country: France
- Region: Nouvelle-Aquitaine
- Department: Landes
- Arrondissement: Dax
- Canton: Orthe et Arrigans

Government
  - Mayor (2020–2026): Annie Lagelouze
- Area^{1}: 22.86 km^{2} (8.83 sq mi)
- Elevation: 140 m (460 ft)
- Highest elevation: 151 m (495 ft)
- Lowest elevation: 59 m (194 ft)
- Population (2023): 832
  - Density: 36.4/km^{2} (94.3/sq mi)
- Time zone: UTC+01:00 (CET)
  - Summer (DST): UTC+02:00 (CEST)
- INSEE/Postal code: 40316 /40360
- ^{1} French Land Register data, which excludes lakes, ponds, glaciers > 1 km^{2} (0.386 sq mi or 247 acres) and river estuaries.

Tilh is a commune in the Landes department in Nouvelle-Aquitaine in southwestern France.

== Population ==
Historical population
| Year | Pop. | ±% p.a. |
|---|---|---|
| 1968 | 770 | — |
| 1975 | 730 | −0.76% |
| 1982 | 794 | +1.21% |
| 1990 | 746 | −0.78% |
| 1999 | 749 | +0.04% |
| 2007 | 811 | +1.00% |
| 2012 | 812 | +0.02% |
| 2017 | 813 | +0.02% |
| 2023 | 832 | +0.39% |
Source: INSEE

== See also ==
- Communes of the Landes department
