= Estibeaux =

- Commune
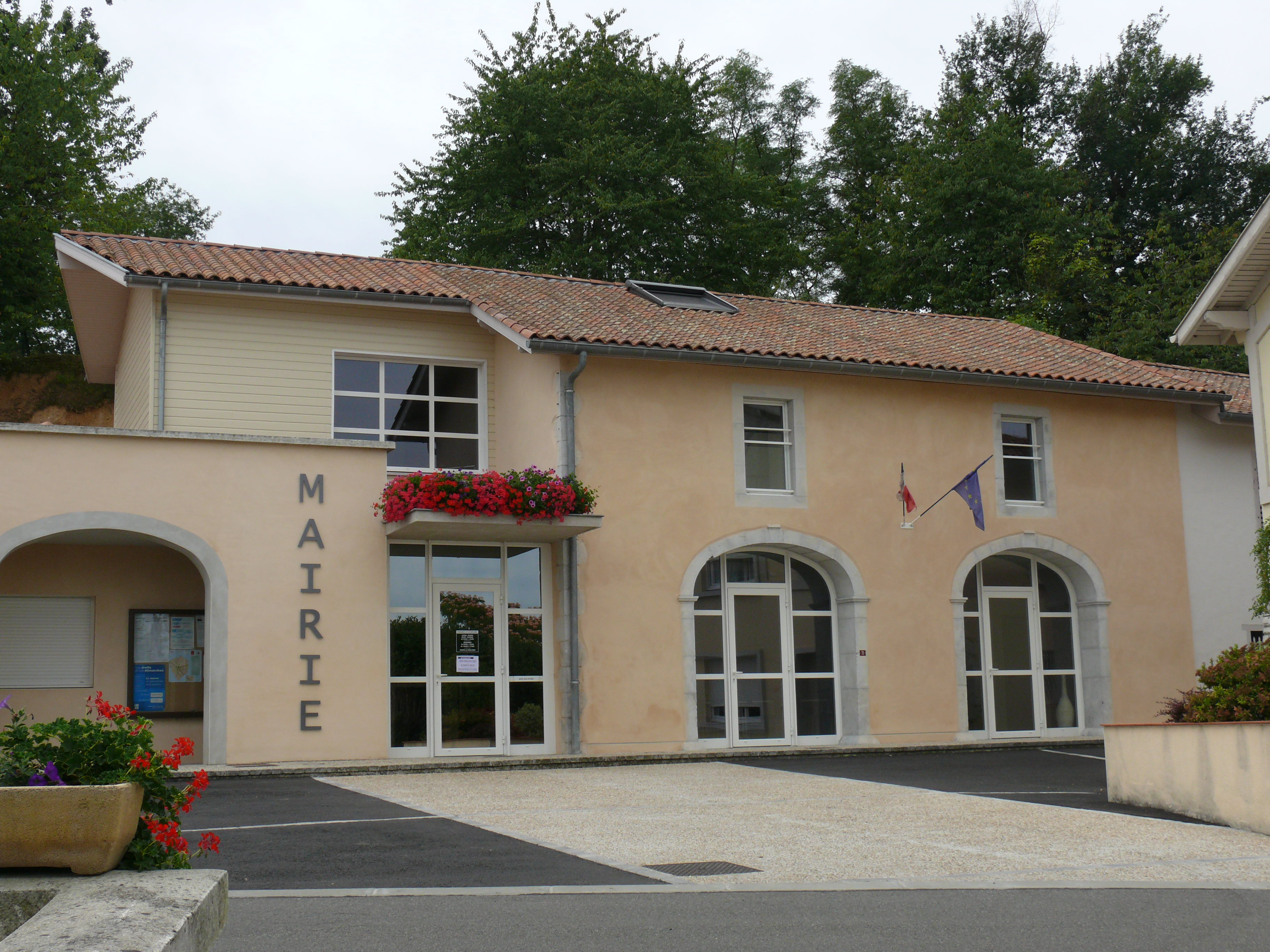
- Town hall
- Location of Estibeaux
- Location within France Location within Nouvelle-Aquitaine
- Coordinates: 43°36′03″N 0°54′20″W
- Country: France
- Region: Nouvelle-Aquitaine
- Department: Landes
- Arrondissement: Dax
- Canton: Orthe et Arrigans
- Intercommunality: Pays d'Orthe et Arrigans

Government
  - Mayor (2020–2026): Philippe Laborde
- Area^{1}: 16.72 km^{2} (6.46 sq mi)
- Elevation: 95 m (312 ft)
- Highest elevation: 126 m (413 ft)
- Lowest elevation: 25 m (82 ft)
- Population (2023): 699
  - Density: 41.8/km^{2} (108/sq mi)
- Time zone: UTC+01:00 (CET)
  - Summer (DST): UTC+02:00 (CEST)
- INSEE/Postal code: 40095 /40290
- ^{1} French Land Register data, which excludes lakes, ponds, glaciers > 1 km^{2} (0.386 sq mi or 247 acres) and river estuaries.

Estibeaux (French pronunciation: [ɛstibo]; Occitan: Estivaus) is a commune in the Landes department in Nouvelle-Aquitaine in southwestern France.

== Population ==
Historical population
Year	Pop.	±% p.a.
1968	524	—
1975	456	−1.97%
1982	479	+0.71%
1990	503	+0.61%
1999	502	−0.02%
2007	568	+1.56%
2012	679	+3.63%
2017	699	+0.58%
2023	699	+0.00%
Source: INSEE

== See also ==
- Communes of the Landes department
