= Arrondissement of Dax =

Coordinates: 43°42′N 1°03′W

Dax
- Arrondissement
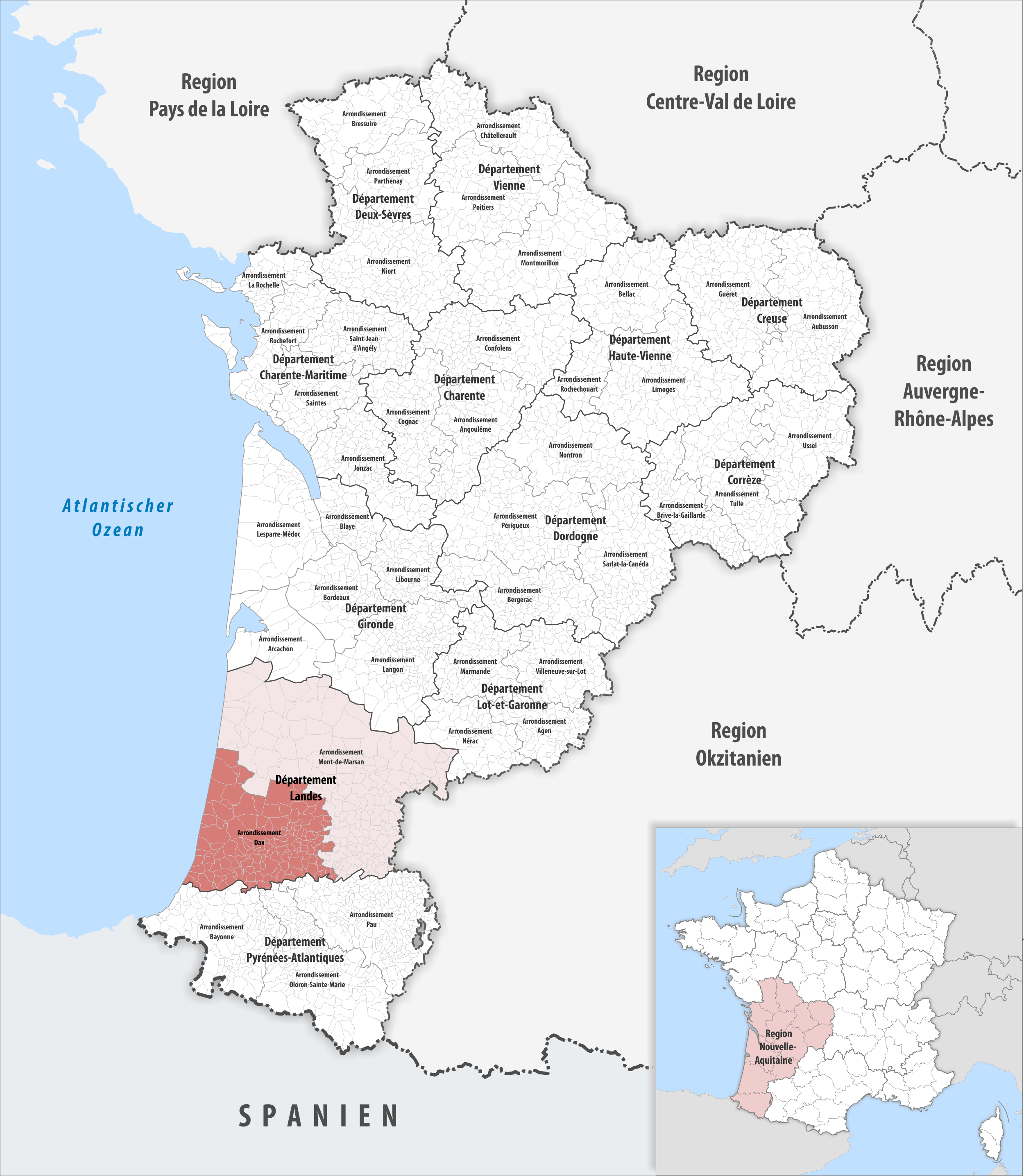
- Location within the region Nouvelle-Aquitaine
- Country: France
- Region: Nouvelle-Aquitaine
- Department: Landes
- No. of communes: {{{nbcomm}}}
- Area: 3,194.2 km^{2} (1,233.3 sq mi)
- Population (2023): 243,517
  - Density: 76.237/km^{2} (197.45/sq mi)
- INSEE code: 401

The arrondissement of Dax is an arrondissement of France in the Landes department in the Nouvelle-Aquitaine region. It has 152 communes. Its population is 237,445 (2021), and its area is 3,194.2 km^{2} (1,233.3 sq mi).

== Composition ==
The communes of the arrondissement of Dax, and their INSEE codes, are:

1. Amou (40002)
2. Angoumé (40003)
3. Angresse (40004)
4. Argelos (40007)
5. Arsague (40011)
6. Audon (40018)
7. Azur (40021)
8. Baigts (40023)
9. Bassercles (40027)
10. Bastennes (40028)
11. Bégaar (40031)
12. Bélus (40034)
13. Bénesse-lès-Dax (40035)
14. Bénesse-Maremne (40036)
15. Bergouey (40038)
16. Beylongue (40040)
17. Beyries (40041)
18. Biarrotte (40042)
19. Biaudos (40044)
20. Bonnegarde (40047)
21. Brassempouy (40054)
22. Cagnotte (40059)
23. Candresse (40063)
24. Capbreton (40065)
25. Carcarès-Sainte-Croix (40066)
26. Carcen-Ponson (40067)
27. Cassen (40068)
28. Castaignos-Souslens (40069)
29. Castelnau-Chalosse (40071)
30. Castel-Sarrazin (40074)
31. Castets (40075)
32. Cauneille (40077)
33. Caupenne (40078)
34. Clermont (40084)
35. Dax (40088)
36. Doazit (40089)
37. Donzacq (40090)
38. Estibeaux (40095)
39. Gaas (40101)
40. Gamarde-les-Bains (40104)
41. Garrey (40106)
42. Gaujacq (40109)
43. Gibret (40112)
44. Goos (40113)
45. Gourbera (40114)
46. Gousse (40115)
47. Gouts (40116)
48. Habas (40118)
49. Hastingues (40120)
50. Hauriet (40121)
51. Herm (40123)
52. Heugas (40125)
53. Hinx (40126)
54. Josse (40129)
55. Labatut (40132)
56. Labenne (40133)
57. Lahosse (40141)
58. Laluque (40142)
59. Lamothe (40143)
60. Larbey (40144)
61. Laurède (40147)
62. Léon (40150)
63. Lesgor (40151)
64. Le Leuy (40153)
65. Lévignacq (40154)
66. Linxe (40155)
67. Lit-et-Mixe (40157)
68. Louer (40159)
69. Lourquen (40160)
70. Magescq (40168)
71. Marpaps (40173)
72. Maylis (40177)
73. Mées (40179)
74. Meilhan (40180)
75. Messanges (40181)
76. Mimbaste (40183)
77. Misson (40186)
78. Moliets-et-Maa (40187)
79. Montfort-en-Chalosse (40194)
80. Mouscardès (40199)
81. Mugron (40201)
82. Narrosse (40202)
83. Nassiet (40203)
84. Nerbis (40204)
85. Nousse (40205)
86. Oeyregave (40206)
87. Oeyreluy (40207)
88. Onard (40208)
89. Ondres (40209)
90. Orist (40211)
91. Orthevielle (40212)
92. Orx (40213)
93. Ossages (40214)
94. Ozourt (40216)
95. Pey (40222)
96. Peyrehorade (40224)
97. Pomarez (40228)
98. Pontonx-sur-l'Adour (40230)
99. Port-de-Lanne (40231)
100. Pouillon (40233)
101. Poyanne (40235)
102. Poyartin (40236)
103. Préchacq-les-Bains (40237)
104. Rion-des-Landes (40243)
105. Rivière-Saas-et-Gourby (40244)
106. Saint-André-de-Seignanx (40248)
107. Saint-Aubin (40249)
108. Saint-Barthélemy (40251)
109. Saint-Cricq-du-Gave (40254)
110. Sainte-Marie-de-Gosse (40271)
111. Saint-Étienne-d'Orthe (40256)
112. Saint-Geours-d'Auribat (40260)
113. Saint-Geours-de-Maremne (40261)
114. Saint-Jean-de-Lier (40263)
115. Saint-Jean-de-Marsacq (40264)
116. Saint-Julien-en-Born (40266)
117. Saint-Laurent-de-Gosse (40268)
118. Saint-Lon-les-Mines (40269)
119. Saint-Martin-de-Hinx (40272)
120. Saint-Martin-de-Seignanx (40273)
121. Saint-Michel-Escalus (40276)
122. Saint-Pandelon (40277)
123. Saint-Paul-lès-Dax (40279)
124. Saint-Vincent-de-Paul (40283)
125. Saint-Vincent-de-Tyrosse (40284)
126. Saint-Yaguen (40285)
127. Saubion (40291)
128. Saubrigues (40292)
129. Saubusse (40293)
130. Saugnac-et-Cambran (40294)
131. Seignosse (40296)
132. Seyresse (40300)
133. Siest (40301)
134. Soorts-Hossegor (40304)
135. Sorde-l'Abbaye (40306)
136. Sort-en-Chalosse (40308)
137. Souprosse (40309)
138. Soustons (40310)
139. Taller (40311)
140. Tarnos (40312)
141. Tartas (40313)
142. Tercis-les-Bains (40314)
143. Téthieu (40315)
144. Tilh (40316)
145. Tosse (40317)
146. Toulouzette (40318)
147. Uza (40322)
148. Vicq-d'Auribat (40324)
149. Vielle-Saint-Girons (40326)
150. Vieux-Boucau-les-Bains (40328)
151. Villenave (40330)
152. Yzosse (40334)

== History ==
The arrondissement of Dax was created in 1800.

As a result of the reorganisation of the cantons of France which came into effect in 2015, the borders of the cantons are no longer related to the borders of the arrondissements. The cantons of the arrondissement of Dax were, as of January 2015:

1. Amou
2. Castets
3. Dax-Nord
4. Dax-Sud
5. Montfort-en-Chalosse
6. Mugron
7. Peyrehorade
8. Pouillon
9. Saint-Martin-de-Seignanx
10. Saint-Vincent-de-Tyrosse
11. Soustons
12. Tartas-Est
13. Tartas-Ouest
