= Sort-en-Chalosse =

- Commune
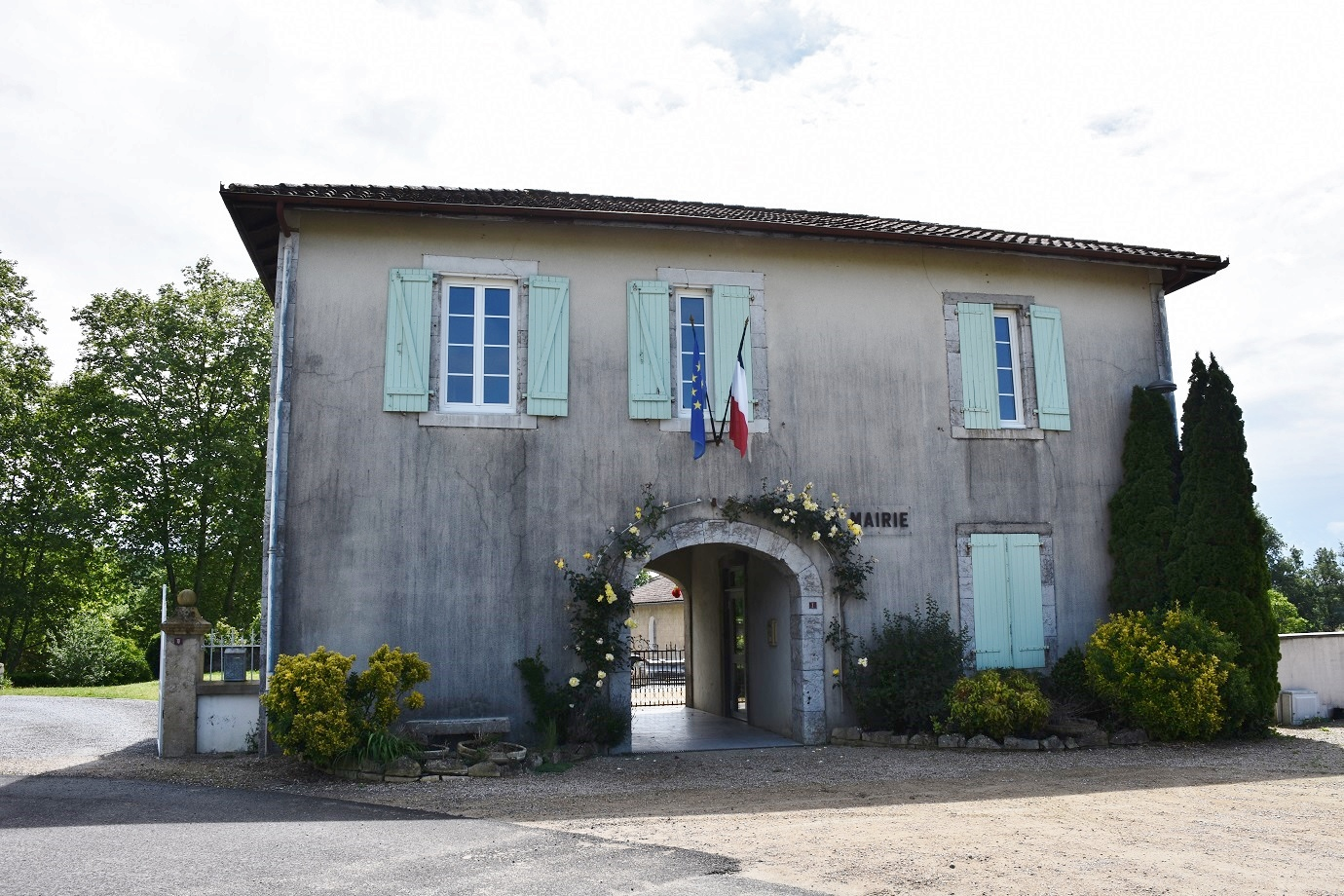
- Sort-en-Chalosse Town hall
- Location of Sort-en-Chalosse
- Location within France Location within Nouvelle-Aquitaine
- Coordinates: 43°41′03″N 0°55′46″W
- Country: France
- Region: Nouvelle-Aquitaine
- Department: Landes
- Arrondissement: Dax
- Canton: Coteau de Chalosse

Government
  - Mayor (2020–2026): Pascal Bernadet
- Area^{1}: 15.39 km^{2} (5.94 sq mi)
- Elevation: 14 m (46 ft)
- Highest elevation: 50 m (160 ft)
- Lowest elevation: 8 m (26 ft)
- Population (2023): 885
  - Density: 57.5/km^{2} (149/sq mi)
- Time zone: UTC+01:00 (CET)
  - Summer (DST): UTC+02:00 (CEST)
- INSEE/Postal code: 40308 /40180
- ^{1} French Land Register data, which excludes lakes, ponds, glaciers > 1 km^{2} (0.386 sq mi or 247 acres) and river estuaries.

Sort-en-Chalosse (French pronunciation: [sɔʁ ɑ̃ ʃalɔs], literally Sort in Chalosse) is a commune in the Landes department in Nouvelle-Aquitaine in southwestern France.

== Population ==
Historical population
Year	Pop.	±% p.a.
1968	541	—
1975	573	+0.82%
1982	617	+1.06%
1990	696	+1.52%
1999	707	+0.17%
2007	819	+1.86%
2012	917	+2.29%
2017	945	+0.60%
2023	885	−1.09%
Source: INSEE

== See also ==
- Communes of the Landes department
