= Gaas, Landes =

Gaas
- Commune
- Location of Gaas
- Location within France Location within Nouvelle-Aquitaine
- Coordinates: 43°36′52″N 1°02′00″W
- Country: France
- Region: Nouvelle-Aquitaine
- Department: Landes
- Arrondissement: Dax
- Canton: Orthe et Arrigans
- Intercommunality: Pays d'Orthe et Arrigans

Government
  - Mayor (2020–2026): Isabelle Cazenave
- Area^{1}: 9.13 km^{2} (3.53 sq mi)
- Elevation: 80 m (260 ft)
- Highest elevation: 87 m (285 ft)
- Lowest elevation: 17 m (56 ft)
- Population (2023): 470
  - Density: 51/km^{2} (130/sq mi)
- Time zone: UTC+01:00 (CET)
  - Summer (DST): UTC+02:00 (CEST)
- INSEE/Postal code: 40101 /40350
- ^{1} French Land Register data, which excludes lakes, ponds, glaciers > 1 km^{2} (0.386 sq mi or 247 acres) and river estuaries.

Gaas (French pronunciation: [ɡas]; Occitan: Gars) is a commune in the Landes department in Nouvelle-Aquitaine in southwestern France. It consists of 471 residents as of 2022, with 238 residences. It has a population density of 52 people/km squared.

== Population ==
Historical population
| Year | Pop. | ±% p.a. |
|---|---|---|
| 1968 | 349 | — |
| 1975 | 305 | −1.91% |
| 1982 | 320 | +0.69% |
| 1990 | 342 | +0.83% |
| 1999 | 364 | +0.70% |
| 2007 | 462 | +3.02% |
| 2012 | 498 | +1.51% |
| 2017 | 496 | −0.08% |
| 2023 | 470 | −0.89% |
Source: INSEE

== See also ==
- Communes of the Landes department
