= Cassen =

- Commune
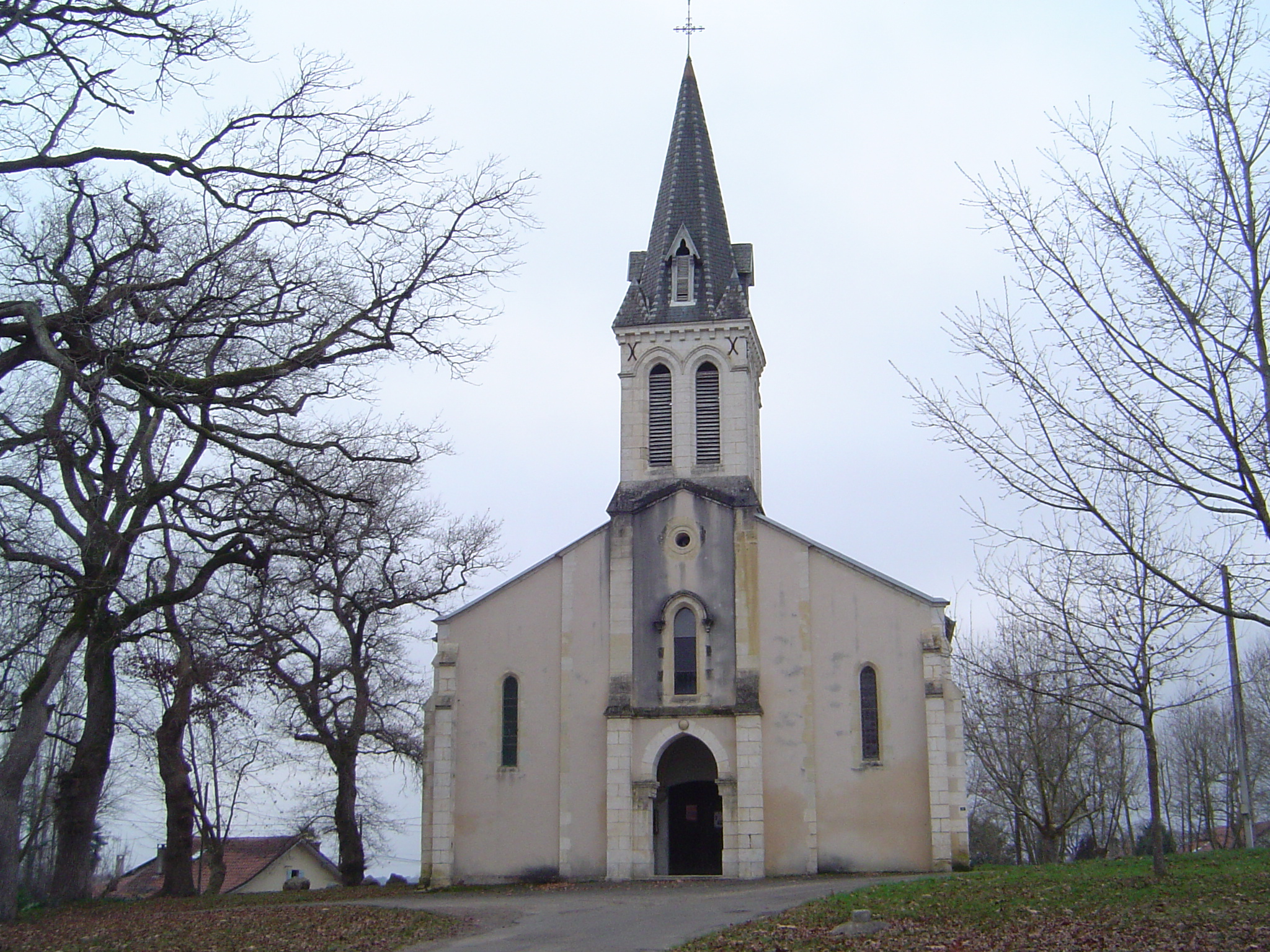
- Location of Cassen
- Location within France Location within Nouvelle-Aquitaine
- Coordinates: 43°45′44″N 0°51′34″W
- Country: France
- Region: Nouvelle-Aquitaine
- Department: Landes
- Arrondissement: Dax
- Canton: Coteau de Chalosse

Government
  - Mayor (2020–2026): Didier Gaugeacq
- Area^{1}: 5.97 km^{2} (2.31 sq mi)
- Elevation: 59 m (194 ft)
- Highest elevation: 65 m (213 ft)
- Lowest elevation: 15 m (49 ft)
- Population (2023): 624
  - Density: 105/km^{2} (271/sq mi)
- Time zone: UTC+01:00 (CET)
  - Summer (DST): UTC+02:00 (CEST)
- INSEE/Postal code: 40068 /40380
- ^{1} French Land Register data, which excludes lakes, ponds, glaciers > 1 km^{2} (0.386 sq mi or 247 acres) and river estuaries.

Cassen is a commune in the Landes department in Nouvelle-Aquitaine in southwestern France.

== Population ==
Historical population
Year	Pop.	±% p.a.
1968	335	—
1975	342	+0.30%
1982	375	+1.32%
1990	339	−1.25%
1999	372	+1.04%
2007	457	+2.61%
2012	567	+4.41%
2017	578	+0.39%
2023	624	+1.28%
Source: INSEE

== See also ==
- Communes of the Landes department
