= Saint-Cricq-du-Gave =

- Commune
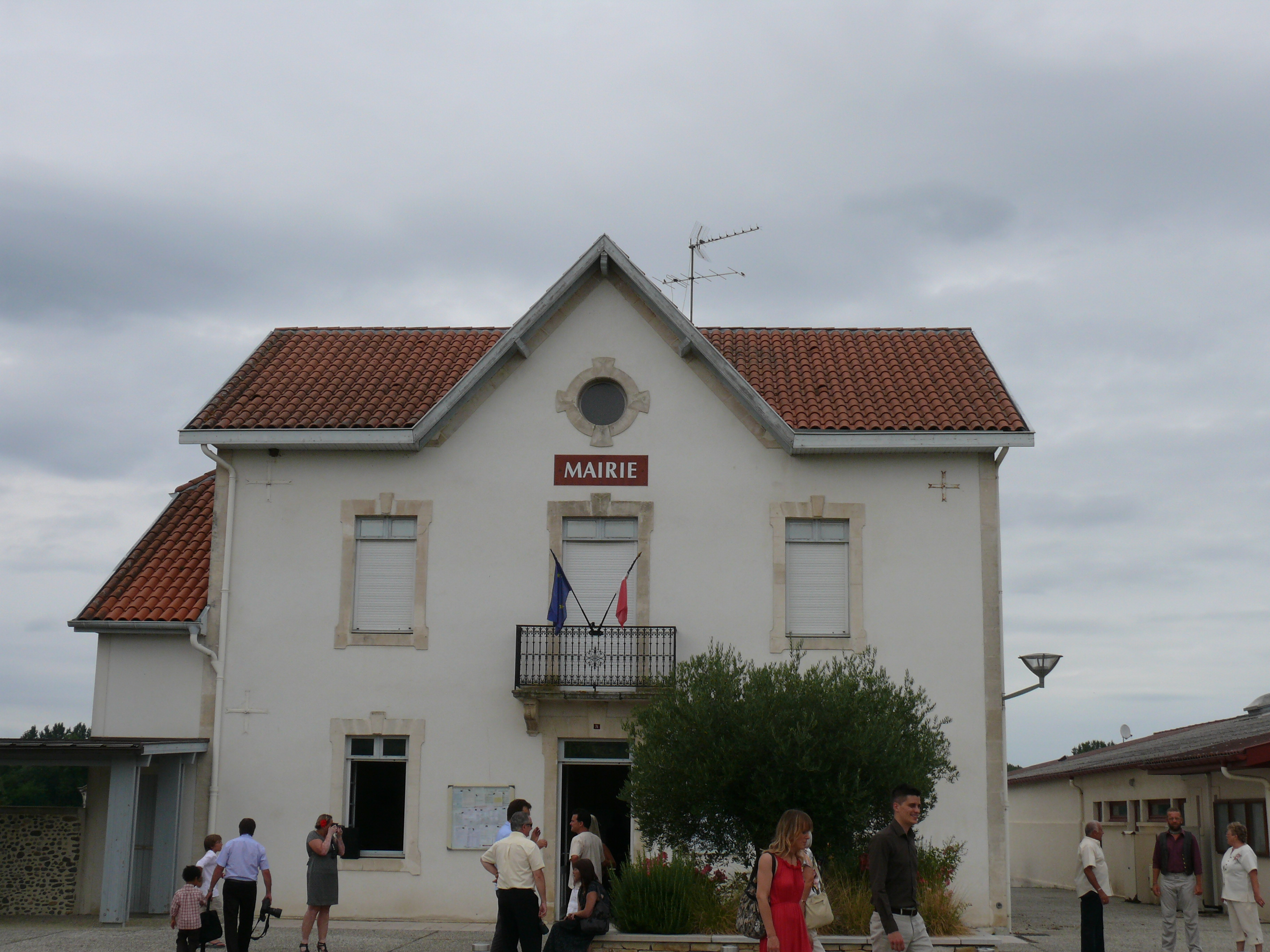
- Town hall
- Location of Saint-Cricq-du-Gave
- Location within France Location within Nouvelle-Aquitaine
- Coordinates: 43°32′05″N 1°00′43″W
- Country: France
- Region: Nouvelle-Aquitaine
- Department: Landes
- Arrondissement: Dax
- Canton: Orthe et Arrigans
- Intercommunality: Pays d'Orthe et Arrigans

Government
  - Mayor (2020–2026): Guy Baubion-Broye
- Area^{1}: 8.7 km^{2} (3.4 sq mi)
- Elevation: 13 m (43 ft)
- Highest elevation: 143 m (469 ft)
- Lowest elevation: 6 m (20 ft)
- Population (2023): 445
  - Density: 51/km^{2} (130/sq mi)
- Time zone: UTC+01:00 (CET)
  - Summer (DST): UTC+02:00 (CEST)
- INSEE/Postal code: 40254 /40300
- ^{1} French Land Register data, which excludes lakes, ponds, glaciers > 1 km^{2} (0.386 sq mi or 247 acres) and river estuaries.

Saint-Cricq-du-Gave (French pronunciation: [sɛ̃ kʁik dy ɡav]; Occitan: Sent Cric deu Gave) is a commune in the Landes department in Nouvelle-Aquitaine in southwestern France.

== Population ==
Historical population
Year	Pop.	±% p.a.
1968	323	—
1975	309	−0.63%
1982	297	−0.56%
1990	304	+0.29%
1999	264	−1.56%
2007	342	+3.29%
2012	369	+1.53%
2017	422	+2.72%
2023	445	+0.89%
Source: INSEE

== See also ==
- Communes of the Landes department
