= Goos =

- Commune
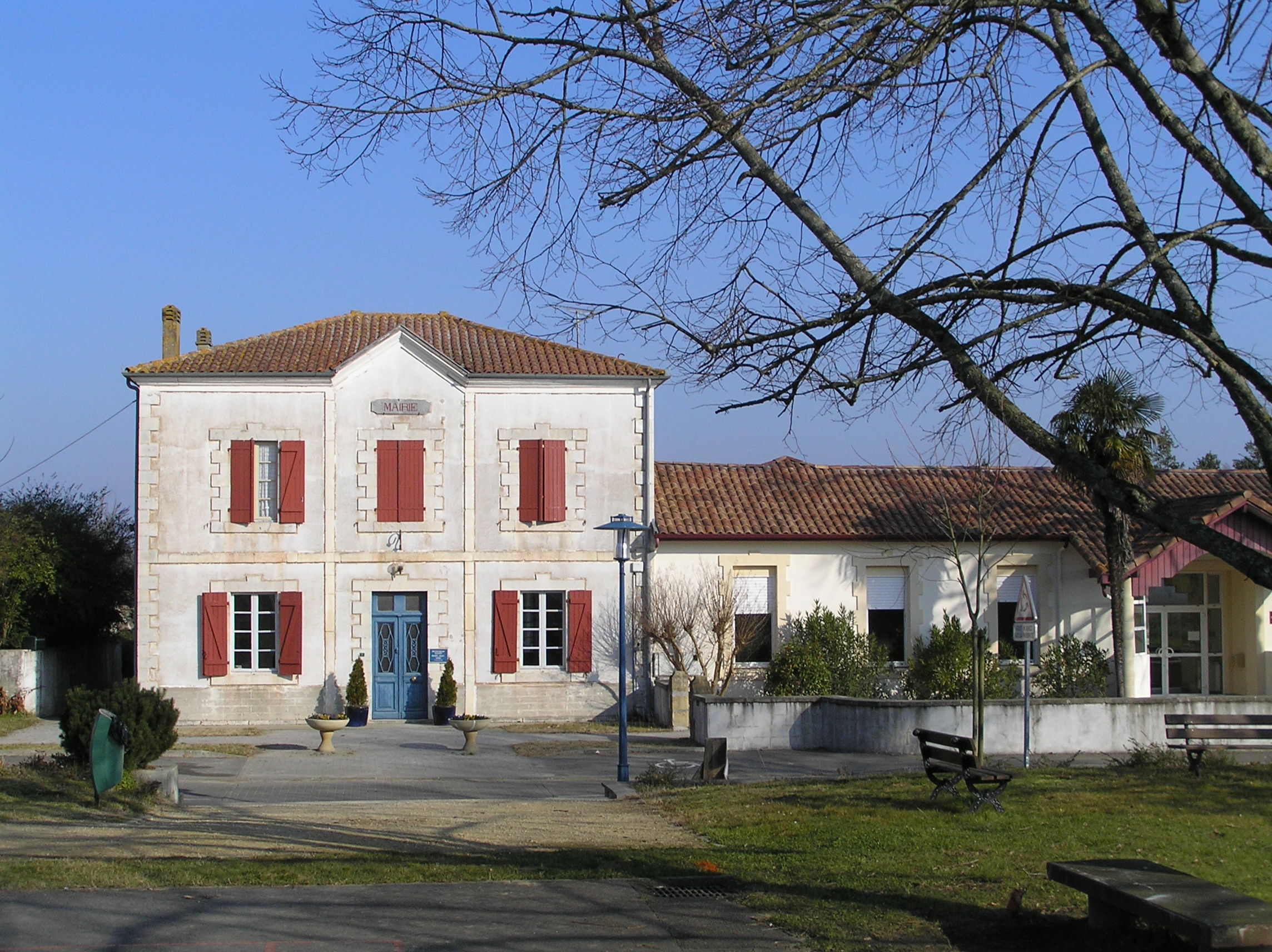
- Town hall
- Location of Goos
- Location within France Location within Nouvelle-Aquitaine
- Coordinates: 43°43′49″N 0°53′54″W
- Country: France
- Region: Nouvelle-Aquitaine
- Department: Landes
- Arrondissement: Dax
- Canton: Coteau de Chalosse

Government
  - Mayor (2020–2026): Patrick Laborde
- Area^{1}: 10.49 km^{2} (4.05 sq mi)
- Elevation: 52 m (171 ft)
- Highest elevation: 73 m (240 ft)
- Lowest elevation: 4 m (13 ft)
- Population (2023): 531
  - Density: 50.6/km^{2} (131/sq mi)
- Time zone: UTC+01:00 (CET)
  - Summer (DST): UTC+02:00 (CEST)
- INSEE/Postal code: 40113 /40180
- ^{1} French Land Register data, which excludes lakes, ponds, glaciers > 1 km^{2} (0.386 sq mi or 247 acres) and river estuaries.

Goos (French pronunciation: [ɡɔs]; Occitan: Gòs) is a commune in the Landes department in Nouvelle-Aquitaine in southwestern France. Its main source of income is tourism.

== Population ==
Historical population
| Year | Pop. | ±% p.a. |
|---|---|---|
| 1968 | 377 | — |
| 1975 | 329 | −1.93% |
| 1982 | 361 | +1.33% |
| 1990 | 437 | +2.42% |
| 1999 | 423 | −0.36% |
| 2007 | 513 | +2.44% |
| 2012 | 537 | +0.92% |
| 2017 | 519 | −0.68% |
| 2023 | 531 | +0.38% |
Source: INSEE

== See also ==
- Communes of the Landes department
