= Loup-Garcie II of Orthe =

Viscount of Orthe in Gascony

Loup-Garcie II, Viscount of Orthe was a medieval Gascon nobleman during the late 12th and early 13th centuries.

== Life ==
He was the son and heir of Guillaume-Raymond of Orthe. His earliest signatory to a charter is recorded in 1173, in a charter issued by King Henry II of England, in his capacity as Duke of Aquitaine, granting privileges to the neighboring town of Dax.

In 1177, during a campaign by Henry II's son Richard, Duke of Aquitaine to pacify rebellious Gascon barons and enforce ducal authority across the south, Loup-Garsie formally submitted to Richard's lordship. To cement this reconciliation, Loup-Garsie asked the duke to be godfather to his newborn son, who was named Richard in the prince's honor.

Following the death of King Richard I in 1199 and the accession of King John, Angevin control over southern Gascony weakened considerably. In 1204, King Alfonso VIII of Castile launched an invasion of the duchy, claiming the territory through the dowry of his wife, Eleanor of England, sister of Richard I and John.

In October 1204, Loup-Garsie II travelled to San Sebastián to pay homage to Alfonso VIII. Alfonso VIII's campaign stalled before the walls of Bordeaux and Bayonne, and Castilian forces withdrew from most of Gascony by 1206.

== Family ==
He had at least two children:

- Richard-Garcie, married Tiburge de Comminges, had issue.
- Merveille, married Pierre Arnaud de Saint-Circq, had issue.
