= Saint-Étienne-d'Orthe =

- Commune
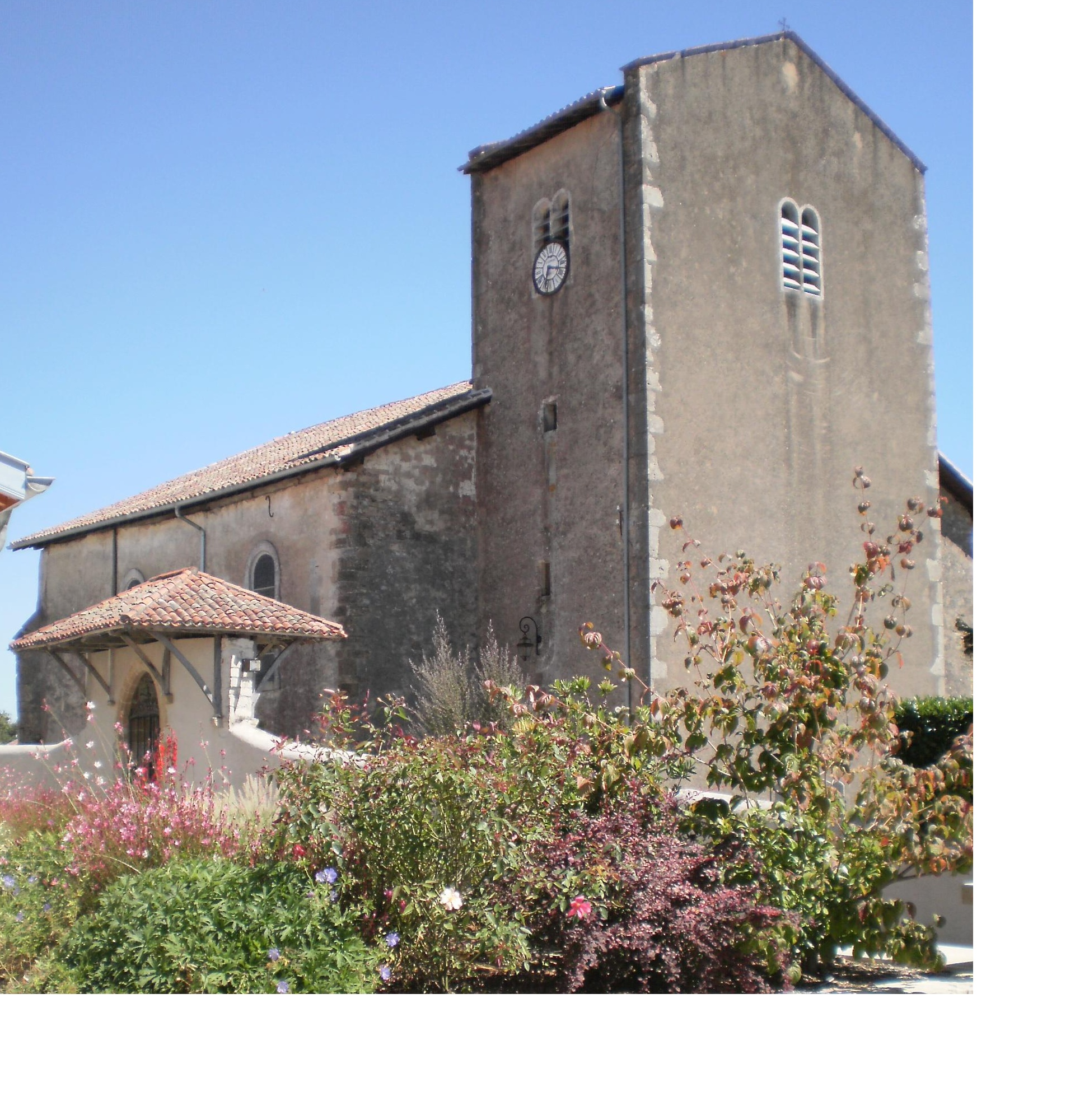
- Location of Saint-Étienne-d'Orthe
- Location within France Location within Nouvelle-Aquitaine
- Coordinates: 43°35′17″N 1°10′37″W
- Country: France
- Region: Nouvelle-Aquitaine
- Department: Landes
- Arrondissement: Dax
- Canton: Orthe et Arrigans

Government
  - Mayor (2020–2026): Alain Diot
- Area^{1}: 11.07 km^{2} (4.27 sq mi)
- Elevation: 45 m (148 ft)
- Highest elevation: 57 m (187 ft)
- Lowest elevation: 2 m (6.6 ft)
- Population (2023): 740
  - Density: 67/km^{2} (170/sq mi)
- Time zone: UTC+01:00 (CET)
  - Summer (DST): UTC+02:00 (CEST)
- INSEE/Postal code: 40256 /40300
- ^{1} French Land Register data, which excludes lakes, ponds, glaciers > 1 km^{2} (0.386 sq mi or 247 acres) and river estuaries.

Saint-Étienne-d'Orthe (French pronunciation: [sɛ̃.t‿etjɛn dɔʁt]; Gascon: Sent Estiene) is a commune in the Landes department in Nouvelle-Aquitaine in southwestern France.

== Population ==
Historical population
Year	Pop.	±% p.a.
1968	502	—
1975	455	−1.39%
1982	439	−0.51%
1990	407	−0.94%
1999	466	+1.52%
2007	552	+2.14%
2012	644	+3.13%
2017	704	+1.80%
2023	740	+0.83%
Source: INSEE

== See also ==
- Communes of the Landes department
