= Oeyregave =

- Commune
- Location of Oeyregave
- Location within France Location within Nouvelle-Aquitaine
- Coordinates: 43°32′05″N 1°05′50″W
- Country: France
- Region: Nouvelle-Aquitaine
- Department: Landes
- Arrondissement: Dax
- Canton: Orthe et Arrigans

Government
  - Mayor (2020–2026): Serge Lasserre
- Area^{1}: 8.03 km^{2} (3.10 sq mi)
- Highest elevation: 69 m (226 ft)
- Lowest elevation: 2 m (6.6 ft)
- Population (2023): 321
  - Density: 40.0/km^{2} (104/sq mi)
- Time zone: UTC+01:00 (CET)
  - Summer (DST): UTC+02:00 (CEST)
- INSEE/Postal code: 40206 /40300
- ^{1} French Land Register data, which excludes lakes, ponds, glaciers > 1 km^{2} (0.386 sq mi or 247 acres) and river estuaries.

Oeyregave (French pronunciation: [wɛjʁəɡav]; Occitan: Ueire Gave) is a commune in the Landes department in Nouvelle-Aquitaine in southwestern France.

== Population ==
Historical population
Year	Pop.	±% p.a.
1968	425	—
1975	402	−0.79%
1982	350	−1.96%
1990	289	−2.37%
1999	293	+0.15%
2007	331	+1.54%
2012	358	+1.58%
2017	344	−0.79%
2023	321	−1.15%
Source: INSEE

== See also ==
- Communes of the Landes department
