= Cauneille =

- Commune
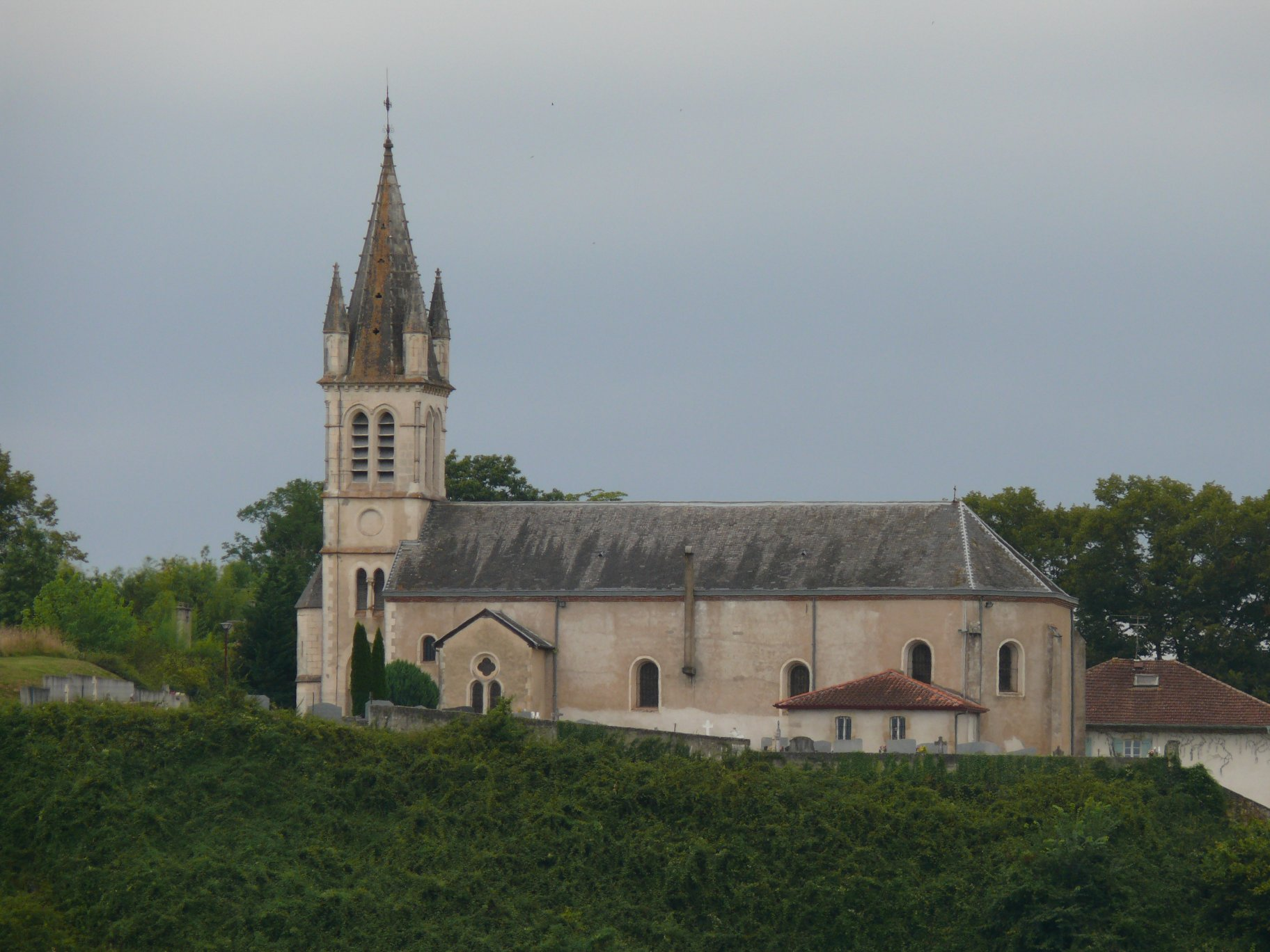
- Location of Cauneille
- Location within France Location within Nouvelle-Aquitaine
- Coordinates: 43°32′52″N 1°03′46″W
- Country: France
- Region: Nouvelle-Aquitaine
- Department: Landes
- Arrondissement: Dax
- Canton: Orthe et Arrigans

Government
  - Mayor (2020–2026): Christian Damiani
- Area^{1}: 15.42 km^{2} (5.95 sq mi)
- Elevation: 9 m (30 ft)
- Highest elevation: 136 m (446 ft)
- Lowest elevation: 2 m (6.6 ft)
- Population (2023): 804
  - Density: 52.1/km^{2} (135/sq mi)
- Time zone: UTC+01:00 (CET)
  - Summer (DST): UTC+02:00 (CEST)
- INSEE/Postal code: 40077 /40300
- ^{1} French Land Register data, which excludes lakes, ponds, glaciers > 1 km^{2} (0.386 sq mi or 247 acres) and river estuaries.

Cauneille (French pronunciation: [konɛj]; Occitan: Caunelha) is a commune in the Landes department in Nouvelle-Aquitaine in southwestern France.

== Population ==
Historical population
Year	Pop.	±% p.a.
1968	617	—
1975	641	+0.55%
1982	638	−0.07%
1990	679	+0.78%
1999	704	+0.40%
2007	777	+1.24%
2012	819	+1.06%
2017	799	−0.49%
2023	804	+0.10%
Source: INSEE

== See also ==
- Communes of the Landes department
