= Bélus =

- Commune
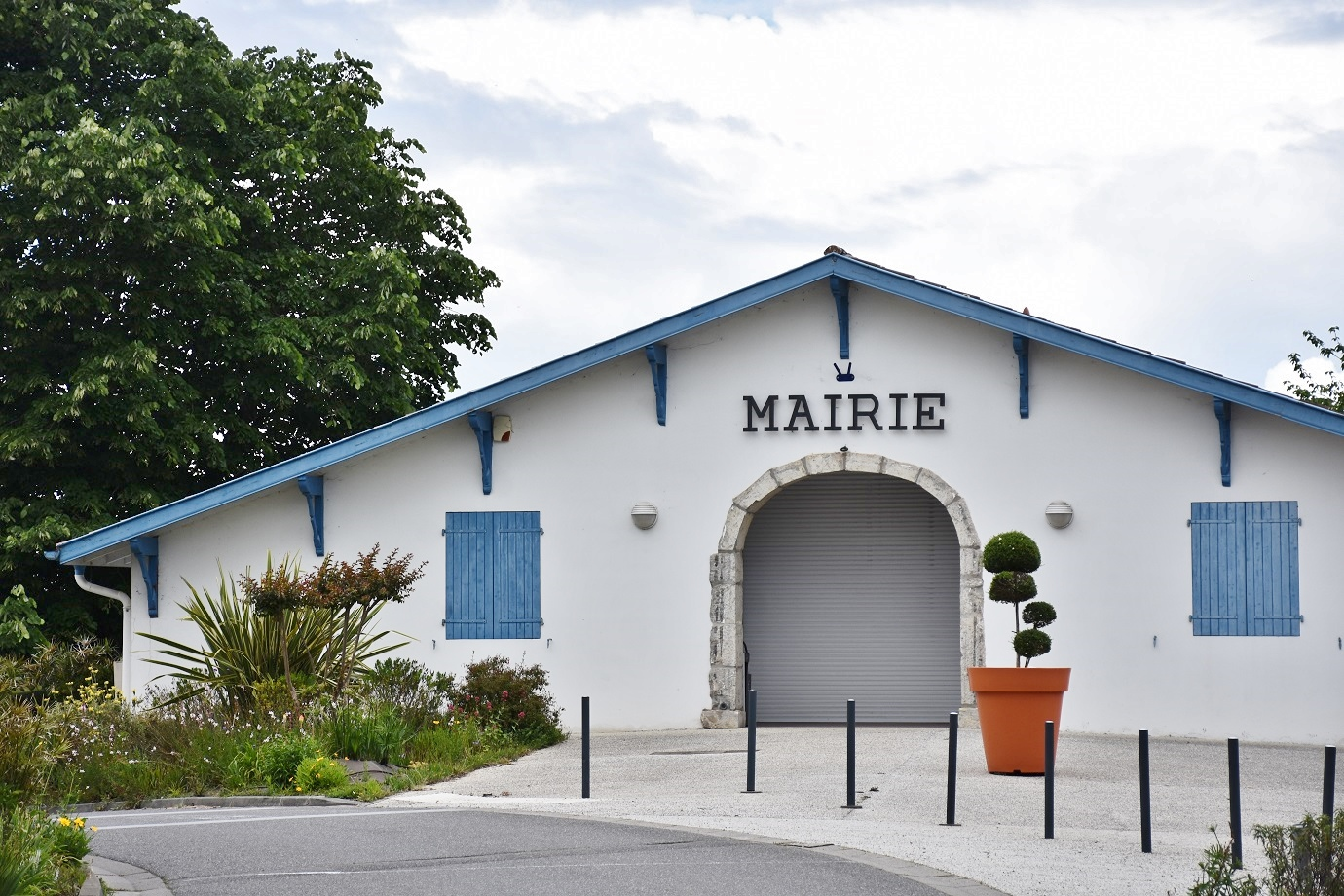
- Bélus Town hall
- Location of Bélus
- Location within France Location within Nouvelle-Aquitaine
- Coordinates: 43°35′31″N 1°06′32″W
- Country: France
- Region: Nouvelle-Aquitaine
- Department: Landes
- Arrondissement: Dax
- Canton: Orthe et Arrigans
- Intercommunality: Pays d'Orthe et Arrigans

Government
  - Mayor (2020–2026): Rachel Durquety
- Area^{1}: 11.84 km^{2} (4.57 sq mi)
- Elevation: 125 m (410 ft)
- Highest elevation: 130 m (430 ft)
- Lowest elevation: 35 m (115 ft)
- Population (2023): 615
  - Density: 51.9/km^{2} (135/sq mi)
- Time zone: UTC+01:00 (CET)
  - Summer (DST): UTC+02:00 (CEST)
- INSEE/Postal code: 40034 /40300
- ^{1} French Land Register data, which excludes lakes, ponds, glaciers > 1 km^{2} (0.386 sq mi or 247 acres) and river estuaries.

Bélus (French pronunciation: [belys]; Gascon: Belús) is a commune in the Landes department in Nouvelle-Aquitaine in southwestern France.

== Population ==
Historical population
Year	Pop.	±% p.a.
1968	445	—
1975	422	−0.76%
1982	416	−0.20%
1990	400	−0.49%
1999	433	+0.88%
2007	592	+3.99%
2012	606	+0.47%
2017	602	−0.13%
2023	615	+0.36%
Source: INSEE

== See also ==
- Communes of the Landes department
