= Misson, Landes =

Misson
- Commune
- Location of Misson
- Location within France Location within Nouvelle-Aquitaine
- Coordinates: 43°35′16″N 0°57′33″W
- Country: France
- Region: Nouvelle-Aquitaine
- Department: Landes
- Arrondissement: Dax
- Canton: Orthe et Arrigans
- Intercommunality: Pays d'Orthe et Arrigans

Government
  - Mayor (2020–2026): Bernard Magescas
- Area^{1}: 14.69 km^{2} (5.67 sq mi)
- Elevation: 475 m (1,558 ft)
- Highest elevation: 112 m (367 ft)
- Lowest elevation: 27 m (89 ft)
- Population (2023): 828
  - Density: 56.4/km^{2} (146/sq mi)
- Time zone: UTC+01:00 (CET)
  - Summer (DST): UTC+02:00 (CEST)
- INSEE/Postal code: 40186 /40290
- ^{1} French Land Register data, which excludes lakes, ponds, glaciers > 1 km^{2} (0.386 sq mi or 247 acres) and river estuaries.

Misson (French pronunciation: [misɔ̃]) is a commune in the Landes department in Nouvelle-Aquitaine in south-western France.

== See also ==
- Communes of the Landes department
