= Saint-Lon-les-Mines =

- Commune
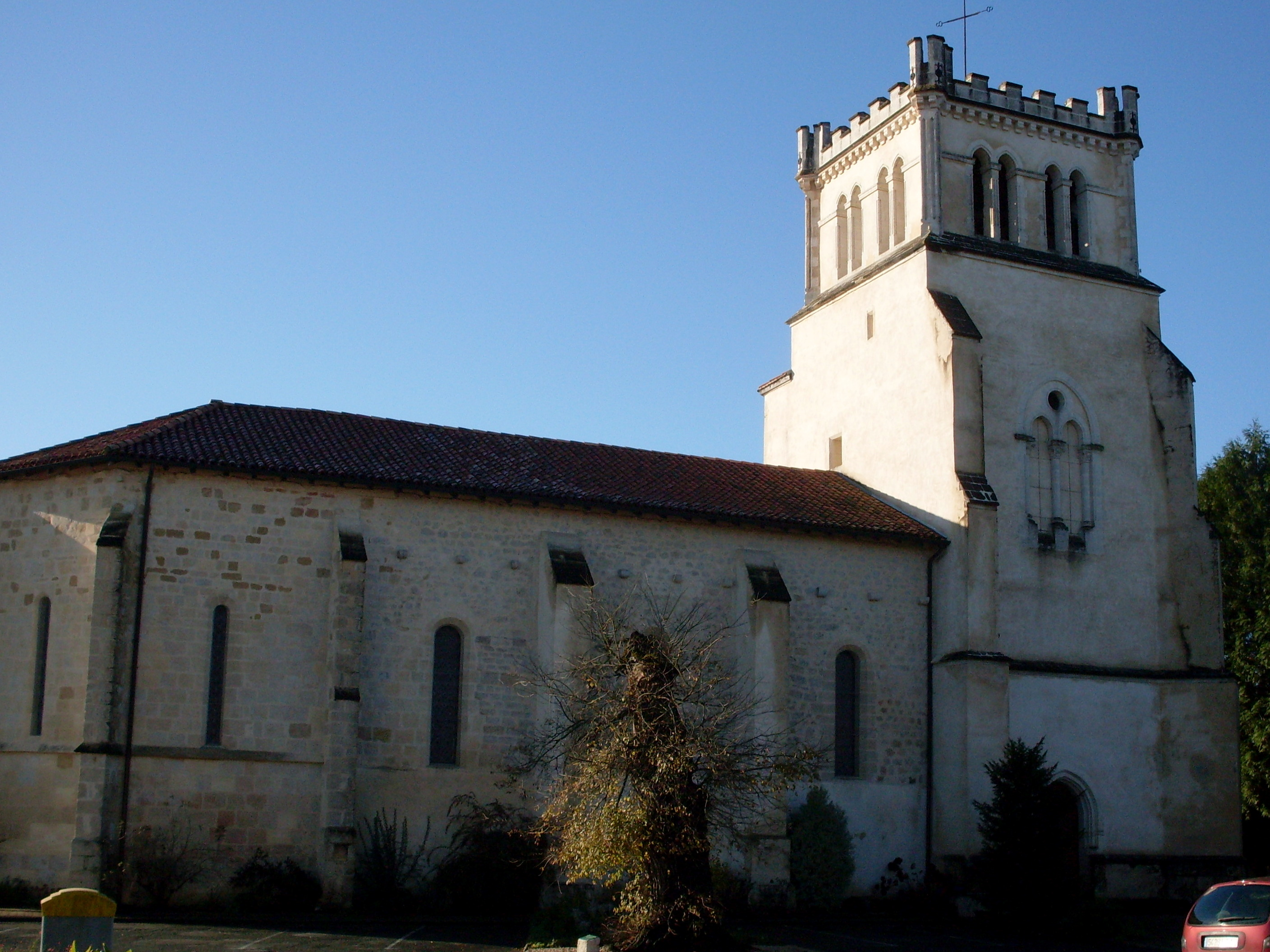
- Location of Saint-Lon-les-Mines
- Location within France Location within Nouvelle-Aquitaine
- Coordinates: 43°36′54″N 1°07′31″W
- Country: France
- Region: Nouvelle-Aquitaine
- Department: Landes
- Arrondissement: Dax
- Canton: Orthe et Arrigans

Government
  - Mayor (2020–2026): Roger Larrodé
- Area^{1}: 21.82 km^{2} (8.42 sq mi)
- Elevation: 104 m (341 ft)
- Highest elevation: 105 m (344 ft)
- Lowest elevation: 4 m (13 ft)
- Population (2023): 1,246
  - Density: 57.10/km^{2} (147.9/sq mi)
- Time zone: UTC+01:00 (CET)
  - Summer (DST): UTC+02:00 (CEST)
- INSEE/Postal code: 40269 /40300
- ^{1} French Land Register data, which excludes lakes, ponds, glaciers > 1 km^{2} (0.386 sq mi or 247 acres) and river estuaries.

Saint-Lon-les-Mines (French pronunciation: [sɛ̃ lɔ̃ le min]; Occitan: Sent Lon) is a commune in the Landes department in Nouvelle-Aquitaine in southwestern France.

== Population ==
Historical population
| Year | Pop. | ±% p.a. |
|---|---|---|
| 1968 | 809 | — |
| 1975 | 803 | −0.11% |
| 1982 | 804 | +0.02% |
| 1990 | 877 | +1.09% |
| 1999 | 905 | +0.35% |
| 2007 | 1,125 | +2.76% |
| 2012 | 1,166 | +0.72% |
| 2017 | 1,208 | +0.71% |
| 2023 | 1,246 | +0.52% |
Source: INSEE

== See also ==
- Communes of the Landes department
