= Orthevielle =

- Commune
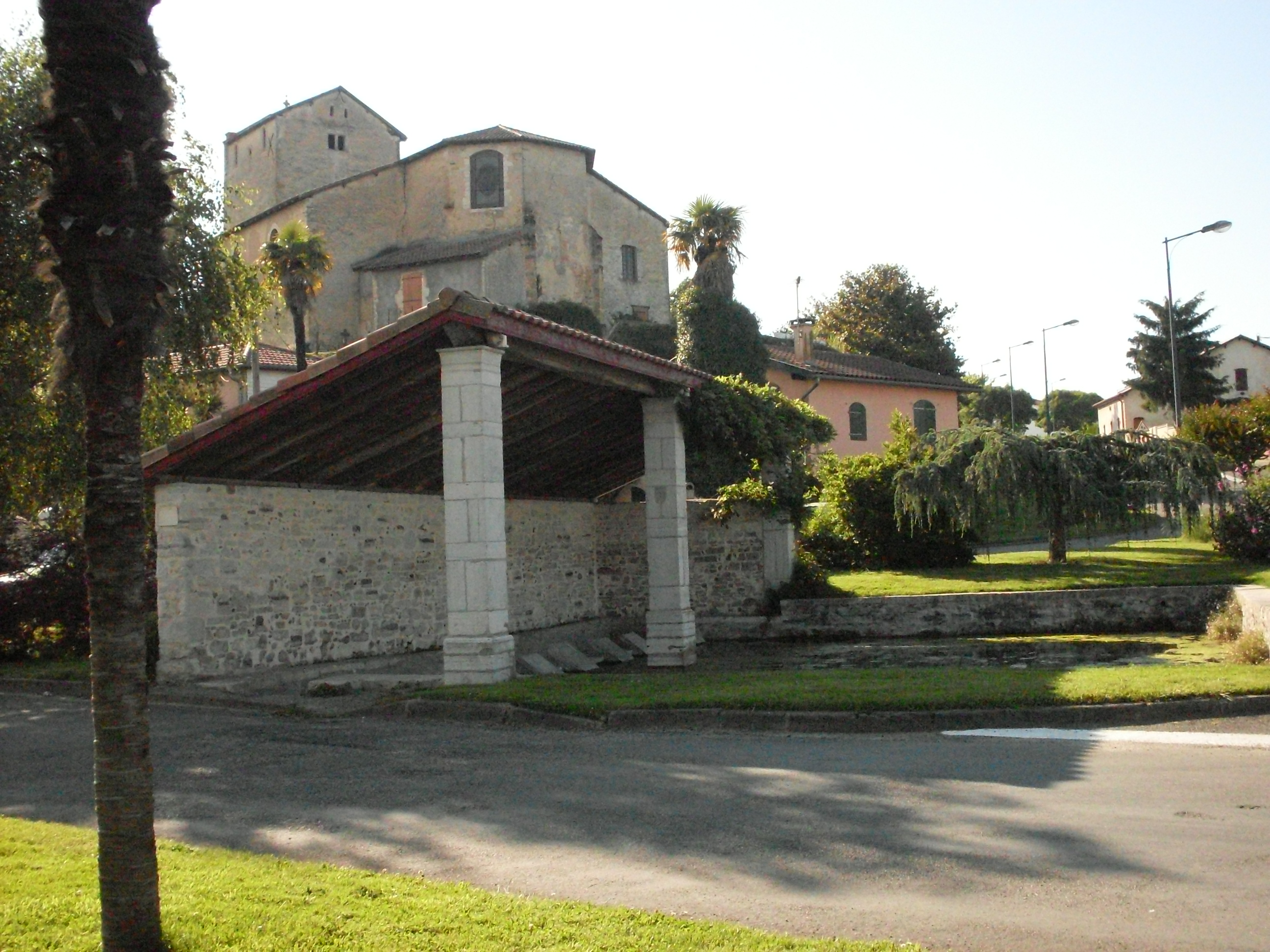
- Church and wash house
- Location of Orthevielle
- Location within France Location within Nouvelle-Aquitaine
- Coordinates: 43°33′11″N 1°08′46″W
- Country: France
- Region: Nouvelle-Aquitaine
- Department: Landes
- Arrondissement: Dax
- Canton: Orthe et Arrigans

Government
  - Mayor (2020–2026): Didie Moustie
- Area^{1}: 13.94 km^{2} (5.38 sq mi)
- Elevation: 6 m (20 ft)
- Highest elevation: 106 m (348 ft)
- Lowest elevation: 1 m (3.3 ft)
- Population (2023): 1,073
  - Density: 76.97/km^{2} (199.4/sq mi)
- Time zone: UTC+01:00 (CET)
  - Summer (DST): UTC+02:00 (CEST)
- INSEE/Postal code: 40212 /40300
- ^{1} French Land Register data, which excludes lakes, ponds, glaciers > 1 km^{2} (0.386 sq mi or 247 acres) and river estuaries.

Orthevielle (French pronunciation: [ɔʁtəvjɛl]; Gascon: Òrtavièla) is a commune in the Landes department in Nouvelle-Aquitaine in southwestern France.

== Population ==
Historical population
| Year | Pop. | ±% p.a. |
|---|---|---|
| 1968 | 629 | — |
| 1975 | 643 | +0.31% |
| 1982 | 705 | +1.32% |
| 1990 | 741 | +0.62% |
| 1999 | 719 | −0.33% |
| 2007 | 841 | +1.98% |
| 2012 | 902 | +1.41% |
| 2017 | 936 | +0.74% |
| 2023 | 1,073 | +2.30% |
Source: INSEE

== See also ==
- Communes of the Landes department
