= Orist =

- Commune
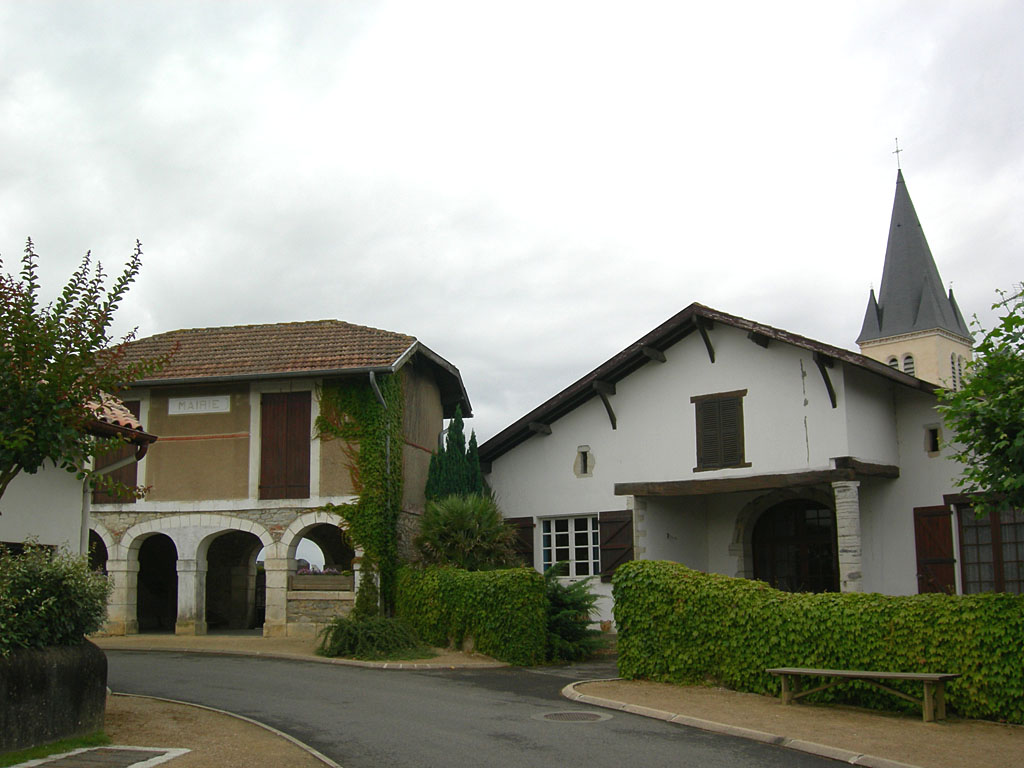
- Old town hall and church
- Location of Orist
- Location within France Location within Nouvelle-Aquitaine
- Coordinates: 43°38′29″N 1°10′33″W
- Country: France
- Region: Nouvelle-Aquitaine
- Department: Landes
- Arrondissement: Dax
- Canton: Orthe et Arrigans
- Intercommunality: Pays d'Orthe et Arrigans

Government
  - Mayor (2020–2026): Gisèle Mamoser
- Area^{1}: 14.76 km^{2} (5.70 sq mi)
- Elevation: 28 m (92 ft)
- Highest elevation: 100 m (330 ft)
- Lowest elevation: 2 m (6.6 ft)
- Population (2023): 814
  - Density: 55.1/km^{2} (143/sq mi)
- Time zone: UTC+01:00 (CET)
  - Summer (DST): UTC+02:00 (CEST)
- INSEE/Postal code: 40211 /40300
- ^{1} French Land Register data, which excludes lakes, ponds, glaciers > 1 km^{2} (0.386 sq mi or 247 acres) and river estuaries.

Orist (French pronunciation: [ɔʁist]) is a commune in the Landes department in Nouvelle-Aquitaine in southwestern France.

== Population ==
Historical population
Year	Pop.	±% p.a.
1968	466	—
1975	440	−0.82%
1982	480	+1.25%
1990	503	+0.59%
1999	537	+0.73%
2007	645	+2.32%
2012	681	+1.09%
2017	722	+1.18%
2023	814	+2.02%
Source: INSEE

== See also ==
- Communes of the Landes department
