= Cagnotte =

- Commune
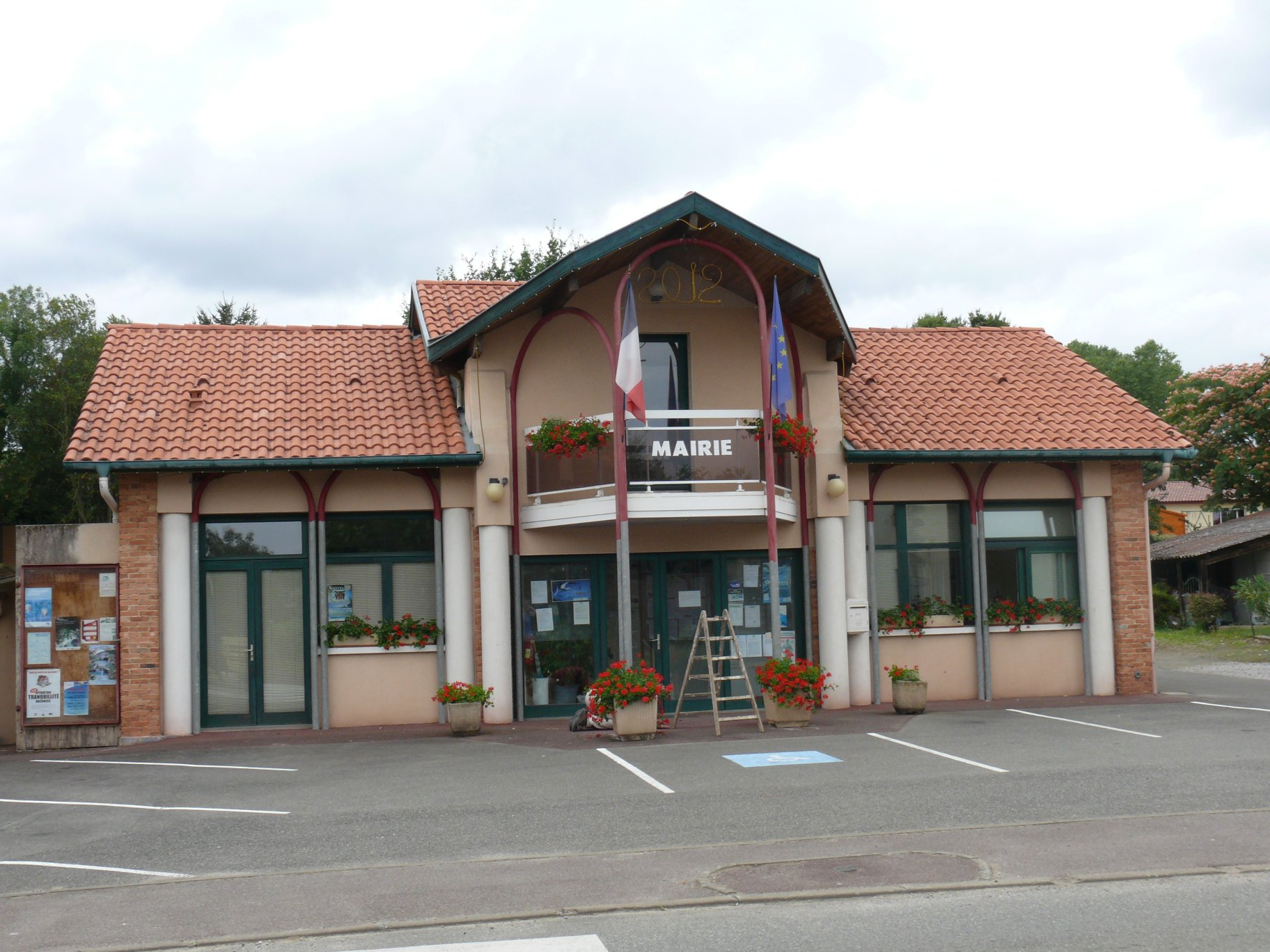
- Town hall
- Location of Cagnotte
- Location within France Location within Nouvelle-Aquitaine
- Coordinates: 43°35′47″N 1°04′00″W
- Country: France
- Region: Nouvelle-Aquitaine
- Department: Landes
- Arrondissement: Dax
- Canton: Orthe et Arrigans

Government
  - Mayor (2020–2026): Robert Bachere
- Area^{1}: 14.68 km^{2} (5.67 sq mi)
- Elevation: 44 m (144 ft)
- Highest elevation: 135 m (443 ft)
- Lowest elevation: 12 m (39 ft)
- Population (2023): 784
  - Density: 53.4/km^{2} (138/sq mi)
- Time zone: UTC+01:00 (CET)
  - Summer (DST): UTC+02:00 (CEST)
- INSEE/Postal code: 40059 /40300
- ^{1} French Land Register data, which excludes lakes, ponds, glaciers > 1 km^{2} (0.386 sq mi or 247 acres) and river estuaries.

Cagnotte (French pronunciation: [kaɲɔt]; Occitan: Canhòta) is a commune in the Landes department in Nouvelle-Aquitaine in southwestern France.

== Population ==
Historical population
Year	Pop.	±% p.a.
1968	457	—
1975	441	−0.51%
1982	472	+0.98%
1990	506	+0.87%
1999	525	+0.41%
2007	653	+2.76%
2012	753	+2.89%
2017	760	+0.19%
2023	784	+0.52%
Source: INSEE

== See also ==
- Communes of the Landes department
