= Communes of the Landes department =

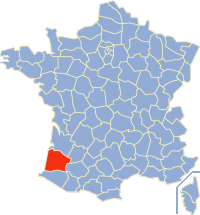

The following is a list of the 327 communes of the Landes department of France.

The communes cooperate in the following intercommunalities (as of 2025):

- Communauté d'agglomération du Grand Dax
- Communauté d'agglomération Mont-de-Marsan Agglomération
- Communauté de communes d'Aire-sur-l'Adour (partly)
- Communauté de communes Chalosse Tursan
- Communauté de communes Cœur Haute Lande
- Communauté de communes Coteaux et Vallées des Luys
- Communauté de communes Côte Landes Nature
- Communauté de communes des Grands Lacs
- Communauté de communes des Landes d'Armagnac
- Communauté de communes de Maremne-Adour-Côte-Sud
- Communauté de communes de Mimizan
- Communauté de communes du Pays Grenadois
- Communauté de communes du Pays Morcenais
- Communauté de communes du Pays d'Orthe et Arrigans
- Communauté de communes du Pays Tarusate
- Communauté de communes du Pays de Villeneuve en Armagnac Landais
- Communauté de communes du Seignanx
- Communauté de communes Terres de Chalosse

| INSEE code | Postal code | Commune |
|---|---|---|
| 40001 | 40800 | Aire-sur-l'Adour |
| 40002 | 40330 | Amou |
| 40003 | 40990 | Angoumé |
| 40004 | 40150 | Angresse |
| 40005 | 40320 | Arboucave |
| 40006 | 40110 | Arengosse |
| 40007 | 40700 | Argelos |
| 40008 | 40430 | Argelouse |
| 40011 | 40330 | Arsague |
| 40012 | 40090 | Artassenx |
| 40013 | 40190 | Arthez-d'Armagnac |
| 40014 | 40120 | Arue |
| 40015 | 40310 | Arx |
| 40016 | 40700 | Aubagnan |
| 40017 | 40500 | Audignon |
| 40018 | 40400 | Audon |
| 40019 | 40200 | Aureilhan |
| 40020 | 40500 | Aurice |
| 40021 | 40140 | Azur |
| 40022 | 40320 | Bahus-Soubiran |
| 40023 | 40380 | Baigts |
| 40024 | 40500 | Banos |
| 40025 | 40090 | Bascons |
| 40026 | 40500 | Bas-Mauco |
| 40027 | 40700 | Bassercles |
| 40028 | 40360 | Bastennes |
| 40029 | 40320 | Bats |
| 40030 | 40310 | Baudignan |
| 40031 | 40400 | Bégaar |
| 40032 | 40410 | Belhade |
| 40033 | 40120 | Bélis |
| 40034 | 40300 | Bélus |
| 40035 | 40180 | Bénesse-lès-Dax |
| 40036 | 40230 | Bénesse-Maremne |
| 40037 | 40280 | Benquet |
| 40038 | 40250 | Bergouey |
| 40039 | 40240 | Betbezer-d'Armagnac |
| 40040 | 40370 | Beylongue |
| 40041 | 40700 | Beyries |
| 40042 | 40390 | Biarrotte |
| 40043 | 40170 | Bias |
| 40044 | 40390 | Biaudos |
| 40046 | 40600 | Biscarrosse |
| 40047 | 40330 | Bonnegarde |
| 40049 | 40270 | Bordères-et-Lamensans |
| 40050 | 40090 | Bostens |
| 40051 | 40090 | Bougue |
| 40052 | 40190 | Bourdalat |
| 40053 | 40120 | Bourriot-Bergonce |
| 40054 | 40330 | Brassempouy |
| 40055 | 40280 | Bretagne-de-Marsan |
| 40056 | 40420 | Brocas |
| 40057 | 40320 | Buanes |
| 40058 | 40120 | Cachen |
| 40059 | 40300 | Cagnotte |
| 40060 | 40430 | Callen |
| 40061 | 40090 | Campagne |
| 40062 | 40090 | Campet-et-Lamolère |
| 40063 | 40180 | Candresse |
| 40064 | 40090 | Canenx-et-Réaut |
| 40065 | 40130 | Capbreton |
| 40066 | 40400 | Carcarès-Sainte-Croix |
| 40067 | 40400 | Carcen-Ponson |
| 40068 | 40380 | Cassen |
| 40069 | 40700 | Castaignos-Souslens |
| 40070 | 40270 | Castandet |
| 40071 | 40360 | Castelnau-Chalosse |
| 40072 | 40320 | Castelnau-Tursan |
| 40073 | 40700 | Castelner |
| 40074 | 40330 | Castel-Sarrazin |
| 40075 | 40260 | Castets |
| 40076 | 40500 | Cauna |
| 40077 | 40300 | Cauneille |
| 40078 | 40250 | Caupenne |
| 40079 | 40700 | Cazalis |
| 40080 | 40270 | Cazères-sur-l'Adour |
| 40081 | 40090 | Cère |
| 40082 | 40320 | Classun |
| 40083 | 40320 | Clèdes |
| 40084 | 40180 | Clermont |
| 40085 | 40210 | Commensacq |
| 40086 | 40500 | Coudures |
| 40087 | 40240 | Créon-d'Armagnac |
| 40088 | 40100 | Dax |
| 40089 | 40700 | Doazit |
| 40090 | 40360 | Donzacq |
| 40091 | 40800 | Duhort-Bachen |
| 40092 | 40500 | Dumes |
| 40093 | 40310 | Escalans |
| 40094 | 40210 | Escource |
| 40095 | 40290 | Estibeaux |
| 40096 | 40240 | Estigarde |
| 40097 | 40320 | Eugénie-les-Bains |
| 40098 | 40500 | Eyres-Moncube |
| 40099 | 40500 | Fargues |
| 40100 | 40190 | Le Frêche |
| 40101 | 40350 | Gaas |
| 40102 | 40310 | Gabarret |
| 40103 | 40090 | Gaillères |
| 40104 | 40380 | Gamarde-les-Bains |
| 40105 | 40420 | Garein |
| 40106 | 40180 | Garrey |
| 40108 | 40160 | Gastes |
| 40109 | 40330 | Gaujacq |
| 40110 | 40320 | Geaune |
| 40111 | 40090 | Geloux |
| 40112 | 40380 | Gibret |
| 40113 | 40180 | Goos |
| 40114 | 40990 | Gourbera |
| 40115 | 40465 | Gousse |
| 40116 | 40400 | Gouts |
| 40117 | 40270 | Grenade-sur-l'Adour |
| 40118 | 40290 | Habas |
| 40119 | 40700 | Hagetmau |
| 40120 | 40300 | Hastingues |
| 40121 | 40250 | Hauriet |
| 40122 | 40280 | Haut-Mauco |
| 40123 | 40990 | Herm |
| 40124 | 40310 | Herré |
| 40125 | 40180 | Heugas |
| 40126 | 40180 | Hinx |
| 40127 | 40190 | Hontanx |
| 40128 | 40700 | Horsarrieu |
| 40129 | 40230 | Josse |
| 40130 | 40700 | Labastide-Chalosse |
| 40131 | 40240 | Labastide-d'Armagnac |
| 40132 | 40300 | Labatut |
| 40133 | 40530 | Labenne |
| 40134 | 40210 | Labouheyre |
| 40135 | 40420 | Labrit |
| 40136 | 40320 | Lacajunte |
| 40137 | 40120 | Lacquy |
| 40138 | 40700 | Lacrabe |
| 40139 | 40090 | Laglorieuse |
| 40140 | 40240 | Lagrange |
| 40141 | 40250 | Lahosse |
| 40142 | 40465 | Laluque |
| 40143 | 40250 | Lamothe |
| 40144 | 40250 | Larbey |
| 40145 | 40270 | Larrivière-Saint-Savin |
| 40146 | 40800 | Latrille |
| 40147 | 40250 | Laurède |
| 40148 | 40320 | Lauret |
| 40149 | 40120 | Lencouacq |
| 40150 | 40550 | Léon |
| 40151 | 40400 | Lesgor |
| 40152 | 40260 | Lesperon |
| 40153 | 40250 | Le Leuy |
| 40154 | 40170 | Lévignacq |
| 40155 | 40260 | Linxe |
| 40156 | 40410 | Liposthey |
| 40157 | 40170 | Lit-et-Mixe |
| 40158 | 40240 | Losse |
| 40159 | 40380 | Louer |
| 40160 | 40250 | Lourquen |
| 40161 | 40240 | Lubbon |
| 40162 | 40090 | Lucbardez-et-Bargues |
| 40163 | 40210 | Lüe |
| 40165 | 40630 | Luglon |
| 40166 | 40270 | Lussagnet |
| 40167 | 40430 | Luxey |
| 40168 | 40140 | Magescq |
| 40169 | 40120 | Maillas |

| INSEE code | Postal code | Commune |
|---|---|---|
| 40170 | 40120 | Maillères |
| 40171 | 40410 | Mano |
| 40172 | 40700 | Mant |
| 40173 | 40330 | Marpaps |
| 40174 | 40320 | Mauries |
| 40175 | 40270 | Maurrin |
| 40176 | 40240 | Mauvezin-d'Armagnac |
| 40177 | 40250 | Maylis |
| 40178 | 40090 | Mazerolles |
| 40179 | 40990 | Mées |
| 40180 | 40400 | Meilhan |
| 40181 | 40660 | Messanges |
| 40182 | 40170 | Mézos |
| 40183 | 40350 | Mimbaste |
| 40184 | 40200 | Mimizan |
| 40185 | 40320 | Miramont-Sensacq |
| 40186 | 40290 | Misson |
| 40187 | 40660 | Moliets-et-Maa |
| 40188 | 40700 | Momuy |
| 40189 | 40700 | Monget |
| 40190 | 40700 | Monségur |
| 40191 | 40500 | Montaut |
| 40192 | 40000 | Mont-de-Marsan |
| 40193 | 40190 | Montégut |
| 40194 | 40380 | Montfort-en-Chalosse |
| 40195 | 40500 | Montgaillard |
| 40196 | 40500 | Montsoué |
| 40197 | 40110 | Morcenx-la-Nouvelle |
| 40198 | 40700 | Morganx |
| 40199 | 40290 | Mouscardès |
| 40200 | 40410 | Moustey |
| 40201 | 40250 | Mugron |
| 40202 | 40180 | Narrosse |
| 40203 | 40330 | Nassiet |
| 40204 | 40250 | Nerbis |
| 40205 | 40380 | Nousse |
| 40206 | 40300 | Oeyregave |
| 40207 | 40180 | Oeyreluy |
| 40208 | 40380 | Onard |
| 40209 | 40440 | Ondres |
| 40210 | 40110 | Onesse-Laharie |
| 40211 | 40300 | Orist |
| 40212 | 40300 | Orthevielle |
| 40213 | 40230 | Orx |
| 40214 | 40290 | Ossages |
| 40215 | 40110 | Ousse-Suzan |
| 40216 | 40380 | Ozourt |
| 40217 | 40160 | Parentis-en-Born |
| 40218 | 40310 | Parleboscq |
| 40219 | 40320 | Payros-Cazautets |
| 40220 | 40320 | Pécorade |
| 40221 | 40190 | Perquie |
| 40222 | 40300 | Pey |
| 40223 | 40700 | Peyre |
| 40224 | 40300 | Peyrehorade |
| 40225 | 40320 | Philondenx |
| 40226 | 40320 | Pimbo |
| 40227 | 40410 | Pissos |
| 40228 | 40360 | Pomarez |
| 40229 | 40200 | Pontenx-les-Forges |
| 40230 | 40465 | Pontonx-sur-l'Adour |
| 40231 | 40300 | Port-de-Lanne |
| 40232 | 40700 | Poudenx |
| 40233 | 40350 | Pouillon |
| 40234 | 40120 | Pouydesseaux |
| 40235 | 40380 | Poyanne |
| 40236 | 40380 | Poyartin |
| 40237 | 40465 | Préchacq-les-Bains |
| 40238 | 40190 | Pujo-le-Plan |
| 40239 | 40320 | Puyol-Cazalet |
| 40240 | 40270 | Renung |
| 40164 | 40120 | Retjons |
| 40242 | 40310 | Rimbez-et-Baudiets |
| 40243 | 40370 | Rion-des-Landes |
| 40244 | 40180 | Rivière-Saas-et-Gourby |
| 40245 | 40120 | Roquefort |
| 40246 | 40630 | Sabres |
| 40247 | 40800 | Saint-Agnet |
| 40248 | 40390 | Saint-André-de-Seignanx |
| 40249 | 40250 | Saint-Aubin |
| 40250 | 40090 | Saint-Avit |
| 40251 | 40390 | Saint-Barthélemy |
| 40253 | 40700 | Saint-Cricq-Chalosse |
| 40254 | 40300 | Saint-Cricq-du-Gave |
| 40255 | 40190 | Saint-Cricq-Villeneuve |
| 40252 | 40700 | Sainte-Colombe |
| 40257 | 40200 | Sainte-Eulalie-en-Born |
| 40258 | 40190 | Sainte-Foy |
| 40271 | 40390 | Sainte-Marie-de-Gosse |
| 40256 | 40300 | Saint-Étienne-d'Orthe |
| 40259 | 40190 | Saint-Gein |
| 40260 | 40380 | Saint-Geours-d'Auribat |
| 40261 | 40230 | Saint-Geours-de-Maremne |
| 40262 | 40120 | Saint-Gor |
| 40263 | 40380 | Saint-Jean-de-Lier |
| 40264 | 40230 | Saint-Jean-de-Marsacq |
| 40265 | 40240 | Saint-Julien-d'Armagnac |
| 40266 | 40170 | Saint-Julien-en-Born |
| 40267 | 40240 | Saint-Justin |
| 40268 | 40390 | Saint-Laurent-de-Gosse |
| 40269 | 40300 | Saint-Lon-les-Mines |
| 40270 | 40320 | Saint-Loubouer |
| 40272 | 40390 | Saint-Martin-de-Hinx |
| 40273 | 40390 | Saint-Martin-de-Seignanx |
| 40274 | 40090 | Saint-Martin-d'Oney |
| 40275 | 40270 | Saint-Maurice-sur-Adour |
| 40276 | 40550 | Saint-Michel-Escalus |
| 40277 | 40180 | Saint-Pandelon |
| 40278 | 40200 | Saint-Paul-en-Born |
| 40279 | 40990 | Saint-Paul-lès-Dax |
| 40280 | 40090 | Saint-Perdon |
| 40281 | 40280 | Saint-Pierre-du-Mont |
| 40282 | 40500 | Saint-Sever |
| 40283 | 40990 | Saint-Vincent-de-Paul |
| 40284 | 40230 | Saint-Vincent-de-Tyrosse |
| 40285 | 40400 | Saint-Yaguen |
| 40286 | 40320 | Samadet |
| 40287 | 40460 | Sanguinet |
| 40288 | 40120 | Sarbazan |
| 40289 | 40500 | Sarraziet |
| 40290 | 40800 | Sarron |
| 40291 | 40230 | Saubion |
| 40292 | 40230 | Saubrigues |
| 40293 | 40180 | Saubusse |
| 40294 | 40180 | Saugnac-et-Cambran |
| 40295 | 40410 | Saugnacq-et-Muret |
| 40296 | 40510 | Seignosse |
| 40297 | 40420 | Le Sen |
| 40298 | 40700 | Serres-Gaston |
| 40299 | 40700 | Serreslous-et-Arribans |
| 40300 | 40180 | Seyresse |
| 40301 | 40180 | Siest |
| 40303 | 40210 | Solférino |
| 40304 | 40150 | Soorts-Hossegor |
| 40305 | 40320 | Sorbets |
| 40306 | 40300 | Sorde-l'Abbaye |
| 40307 | 40430 | Sore |
| 40308 | 40180 | Sort-en-Chalosse |
| 40309 | 40250 | Souprosse |
| 40310 | 40140 | Soustons |
| 40311 | 40260 | Taller |
| 40312 | 40220 | Tarnos |
| 40313 | 40400 | Tartas |
| 40314 | 40180 | Tercis-les-Bains |
| 40315 | 40990 | Téthieu |
| 40316 | 40360 | Tilh |
| 40317 | 40230 | Tosse |
| 40318 | 40250 | Toulouzette |
| 40319 | 40630 | Trensacq |
| 40320 | 40090 | Uchacq-et-Parentis |
| 40321 | 40320 | Urgons |
| 40322 | 40170 | Uza |
| 40323 | 40420 | Vert |
| 40324 | 40380 | Vicq-d'Auribat |
| 40326 | 40560 | Vielle-Saint-Girons |
| 40327 | 40240 | Vielle-Soubiran |
| 40325 | 40320 | Vielle-Tursan |
| 40328 | 40480 | Vieux-Boucau-les-Bains |
| 40329 | 40270 | Le Vignau |
| 40330 | 40110 | Villenave |
| 40331 | 40190 | Villeneuve-de-Marsan |
| 40332 | 40160 | Ychoux |
| 40333 | 40110 | Ygos-Saint-Saturnin |
| 40334 | 40180 | Yzosse |
