= Ponson =

Ponson may refer to:

== Places ==
- Ponson Island, an island located in the province of Cebu
- Carcen-Ponson, a commune in south-western France
- Ponson-Dessus, a commune in south-western France
- Ponson-Debat-Pouts, a commune in south-western France

== People ==
- Sidney Ponson, former Major League Baseball pitcher
- Édouard Debat-Ponsan, a French academic painter
