= Audon =

- Commune
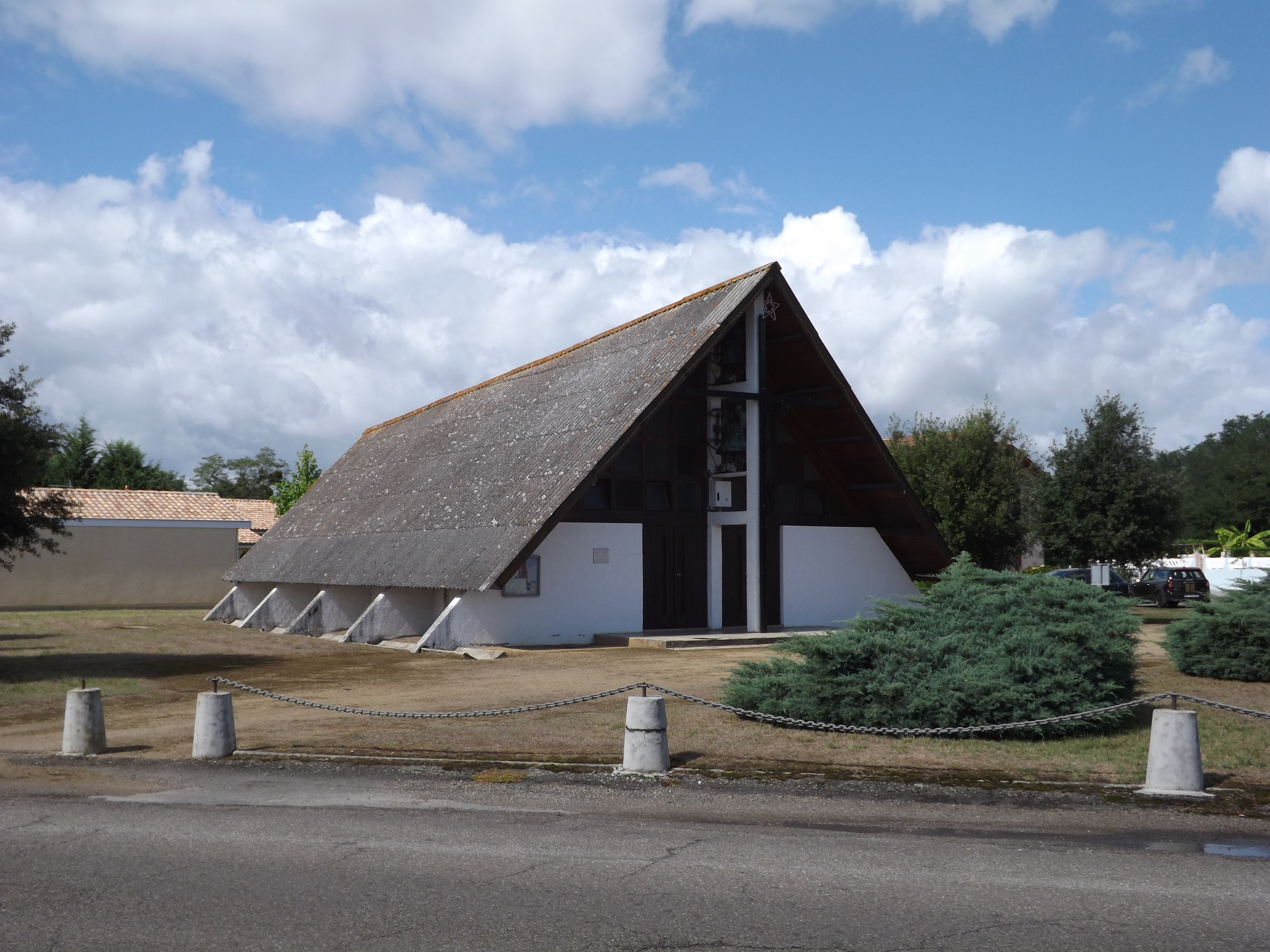
- The church of Audon

- Coat of arms
- Location of Audon
- Location within France Location within Nouvelle-Aquitaine
- Coordinates: 43°47′54″N 0°49′30″W
- Country: France
- Region: Nouvelle-Aquitaine
- Department: Landes
- Arrondissement: Dax
- Canton: Pays morcenais tarusate
- Intercommunality: CC Pays Tarusate

Government
  - Mayor (2020–2026): Laurent Nolibois
- Area^{1}: 7.55 km^{2} (2.92 sq mi)
- Elevation: 45 m (148 ft)
- Highest elevation: 55 m (180 ft)
- Lowest elevation: 8 m (26 ft)
- Population (2023): 409
  - Density: 54.2/km^{2} (140/sq mi)
- Time zone: UTC+01:00 (CET)
  - Summer (DST): UTC+02:00 (CEST)
- INSEE/Postal code: 40018 /40400
- ^{1} French Land Register data, which excludes lakes, ponds, glaciers > 1 km^{2} (0.386 sq mi or 247 acres) and river estuaries.

Audon (French pronunciation: [odɔ̃]) is a commune of the Landes department in Nouvelle-Aquitaine in southwestern France.

== Population ==
Historical population
Year	Pop.	±% p.a.
1968	325	—
1975	314	−0.49%
1982	279	−1.67%
1990	276	−0.14%
1999	275	−0.04%
2007	340	+2.69%
2012	335	−0.30%
2017	373	+2.17%
2023	409	+1.55%
Source: INSEE

== See also ==
- Communes of the Landes department
