= Lamothe, Landes =

Lamothe
- Commune
- Location of Lamothe
- Location within France Location within Nouvelle-Aquitaine
- Coordinates: 43°47′32″N 0°39′07″W
- Country: France
- Region: Nouvelle-Aquitaine
- Department: Landes
- Arrondissement: Dax
- Canton: Pays morcenais tarusate
- Intercommunality: Pays Tarusate

Government
  - Mayor (2020–2026): Sylvie Daugreilh-Dubourg
- Area^{1}: 12.63 km^{2} (4.88 sq mi)
- Elevation: 30 m (98 ft)
- Highest elevation: 74 m (243 ft)
- Lowest elevation: 27 m (89 ft)
- Population (2023): 308
  - Density: 24.4/km^{2} (63.2/sq mi)
- Time zone: UTC+01:00 (CET)
  - Summer (DST): UTC+02:00 (CEST)
- INSEE/Postal code: 40143 /40250
- ^{1} French Land Register data, which excludes lakes, ponds, glaciers > 1 km^{2} (0.386 sq mi or 247 acres) and river estuaries.

Lamothe (French pronunciation: [lamɔt]; Occitan: La Mòta) is a commune in the Landes department in Nouvelle-Aquitaine in south-western France.

== See also ==
- Communes of the Landes department
