= Villenave =

- Commune
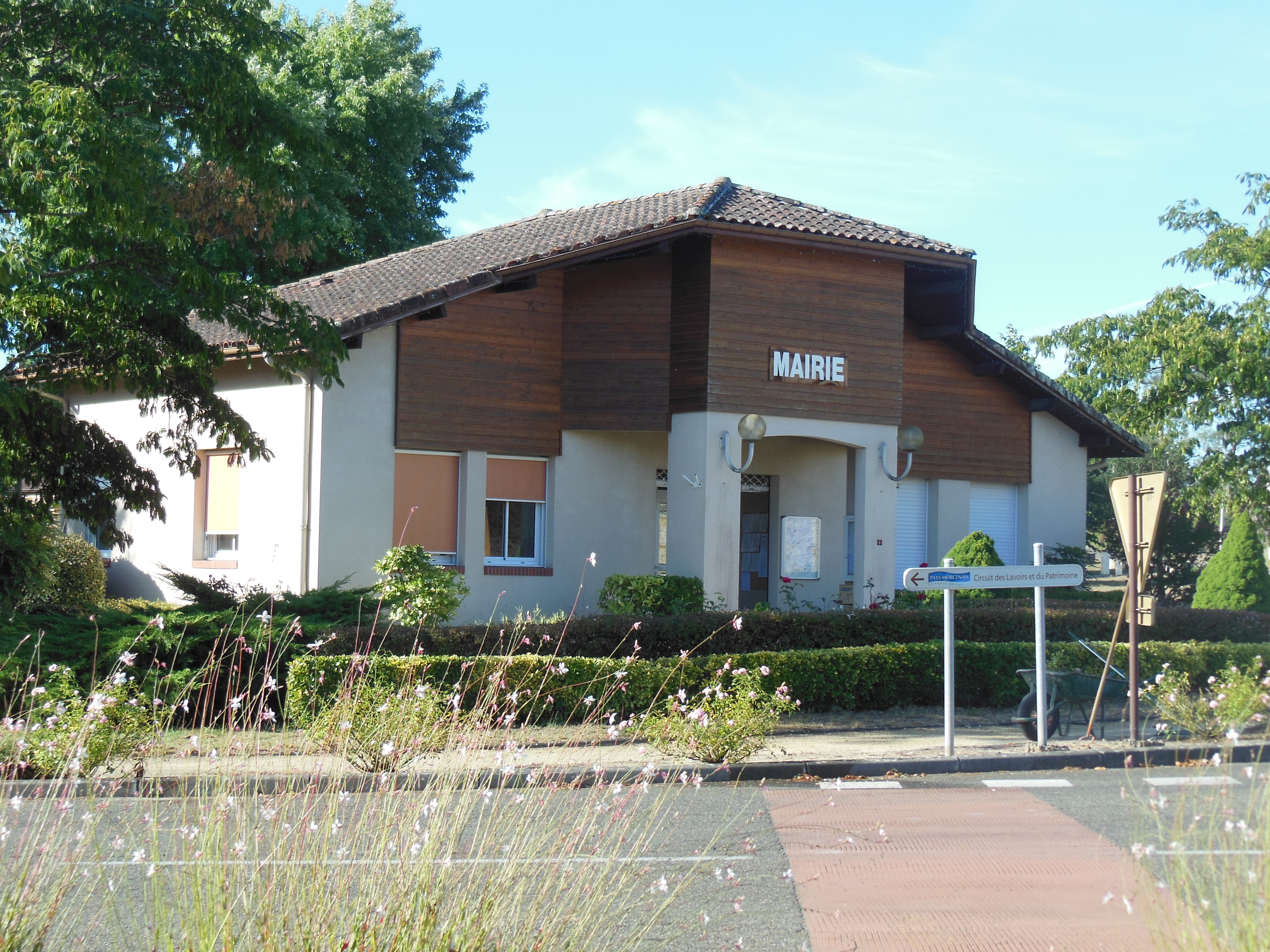
- Town hall
- Location of Villenave
- Location within France Location within Nouvelle-Aquitaine
- Coordinates: 43°58′08″N 0°48′23″W
- Country: France
- Region: Nouvelle-Aquitaine
- Department: Landes
- Arrondissement: Dax
- Canton: Pays morcenais tarusate
- Intercommunality: Pays Tarusate

Government
  - Mayor (2020–2026): Jacques Durand
- Area^{1}: 27.37 km^{2} (10.57 sq mi)
- Elevation: 40 m (130 ft)
- Highest elevation: 99 m (325 ft)
- Lowest elevation: 27 m (89 ft)
- Population (2023): 312
  - Density: 11.4/km^{2} (29.5/sq mi)
- Time zone: UTC+01:00 (CET)
  - Summer (DST): UTC+02:00 (CEST)
- INSEE/Postal code: 40330 /40110
- ^{1} French Land Register data, which excludes lakes, ponds, glaciers > 1 km^{2} (0.386 sq mi or 247 acres) and river estuaries.

Villenave (French pronunciation: [vilnav]; Occitan: Vilanava) is a commune in the Landes department in Nouvelle-Aquitaine in southwestern France.

== Population ==
Historical population
Year	Pop.	±% p.a.
1968	397	—
1975	326	−2.78%
1982	289	−1.71%
1990	273	−0.71%
1999	253	−0.84%
2007	248	−0.25%
2012	273	+1.94%
2017	326	+3.61%
2023	312	−0.73%
Source: INSEE

== See also ==
- Communes of the Landes department
