= Toulouzette =

- Commune
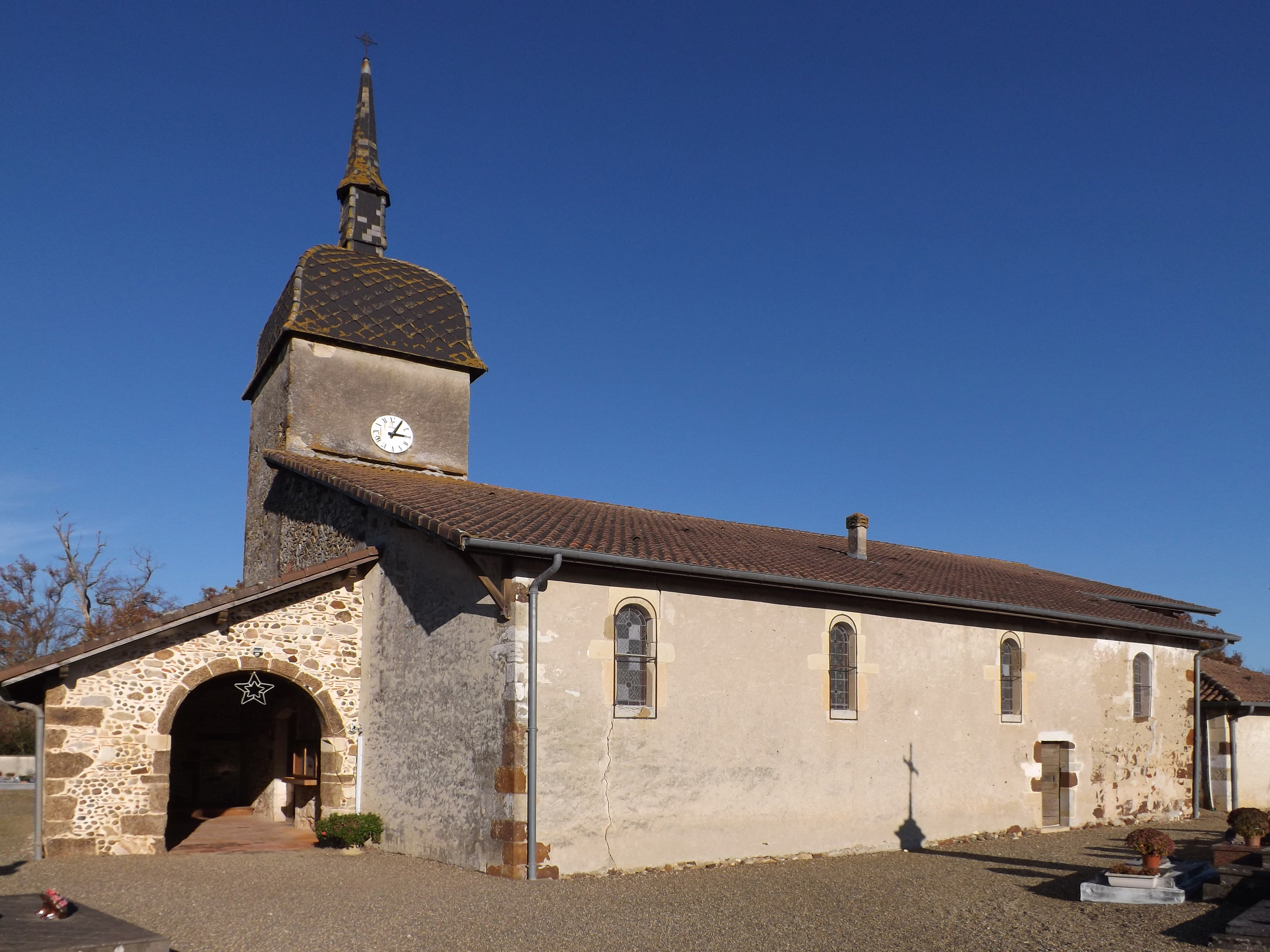
- Location of Toulouzette
- Location within France Location within Nouvelle-Aquitaine
- Coordinates: 43°45′25″N 0°41′06″W
- Country: France
- Region: Nouvelle-Aquitaine
- Department: Landes
- Arrondissement: Dax
- Canton: Coteau de Chalosse

Government
  - Mayor (2020–2026): Guillaume Lalanne
- Area^{1}: 11.26 km^{2} (4.35 sq mi)
- Elevation: 30 m (98 ft)
- Highest elevation: 98 m (322 ft)
- Lowest elevation: 19 m (62 ft)
- Population (2023): 309
  - Density: 27.4/km^{2} (71.1/sq mi)
- Time zone: UTC+01:00 (CET)
  - Summer (DST): UTC+02:00 (CEST)
- INSEE/Postal code: 40318 /40250
- ^{1} French Land Register data, which excludes lakes, ponds, glaciers > 1 km^{2} (0.386 sq mi or 247 acres) and river estuaries.

Toulouzette (French pronunciation: [tuluzɛt]) is a commune in the Landes department in Nouvelle-Aquitaine in southwestern France.

== Population ==
Historical population
Year	Pop.	±% p.a.
1968	341	—
1975	303	−1.67%
1982	300	−0.14%
1990	257	−1.92%
1999	269	+0.51%
2007	273	+0.18%
2012	289	+1.15%
2017	322	+2.19%
2023	309	−0.68%
Source: INSEE

== See also ==
- Communes of the Landes department
