= Gouts =

- Commune
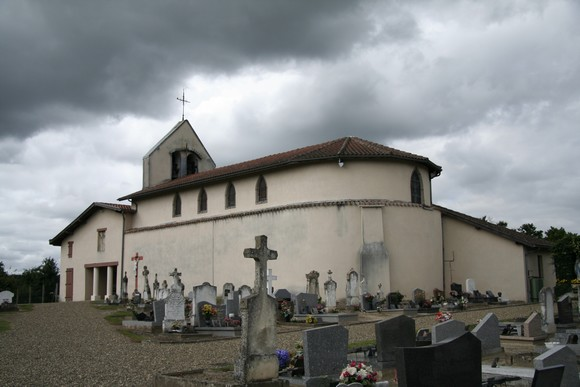
- Location of Gouts
- Location within France Location within Nouvelle-Aquitaine
- Coordinates: 43°47′22″N 0°48′06″W
- Country: France
- Region: Nouvelle-Aquitaine
- Department: Landes
- Arrondissement: Dax
- Canton: Pays morcenais tarusate
- Intercommunality: Pays Tarusate

Government
  - Mayor (2020–2026): Nicolas Saugnac
- Area^{1}: 10.88 km^{2} (4.20 sq mi)
- Elevation: 23 m (75 ft)
- Highest elevation: 34 m (112 ft)
- Lowest elevation: 11 m (36 ft)
- Population (2023): 271
  - Density: 24.9/km^{2} (64.5/sq mi)
- Time zone: UTC+01:00 (CET)
  - Summer (DST): UTC+02:00 (CEST)
- INSEE/Postal code: 40116 /40400
- ^{1} French Land Register data, which excludes lakes, ponds, glaciers > 1 km^{2} (0.386 sq mi or 247 acres) and river estuaries.

Gouts (French pronunciation: [ɡuts]; Gascon: Gots) is a commune in the Landes department in Nouvelle-Aquitaine in southwestern France.

== Population ==
Historical population
Year	Pop.	±% p.a.
1968	269	—
1975	242	−1.50%
1982	223	−1.16%
1990	211	−0.69%
1999	238	+1.35%
2007	240	+0.10%
2012	261	+1.69%
2017	276	+1.12%
2023	271	−0.30%
Source: INSEE

== See also ==
- Communes of the Landes department
