= Le Leuy =

- Commune
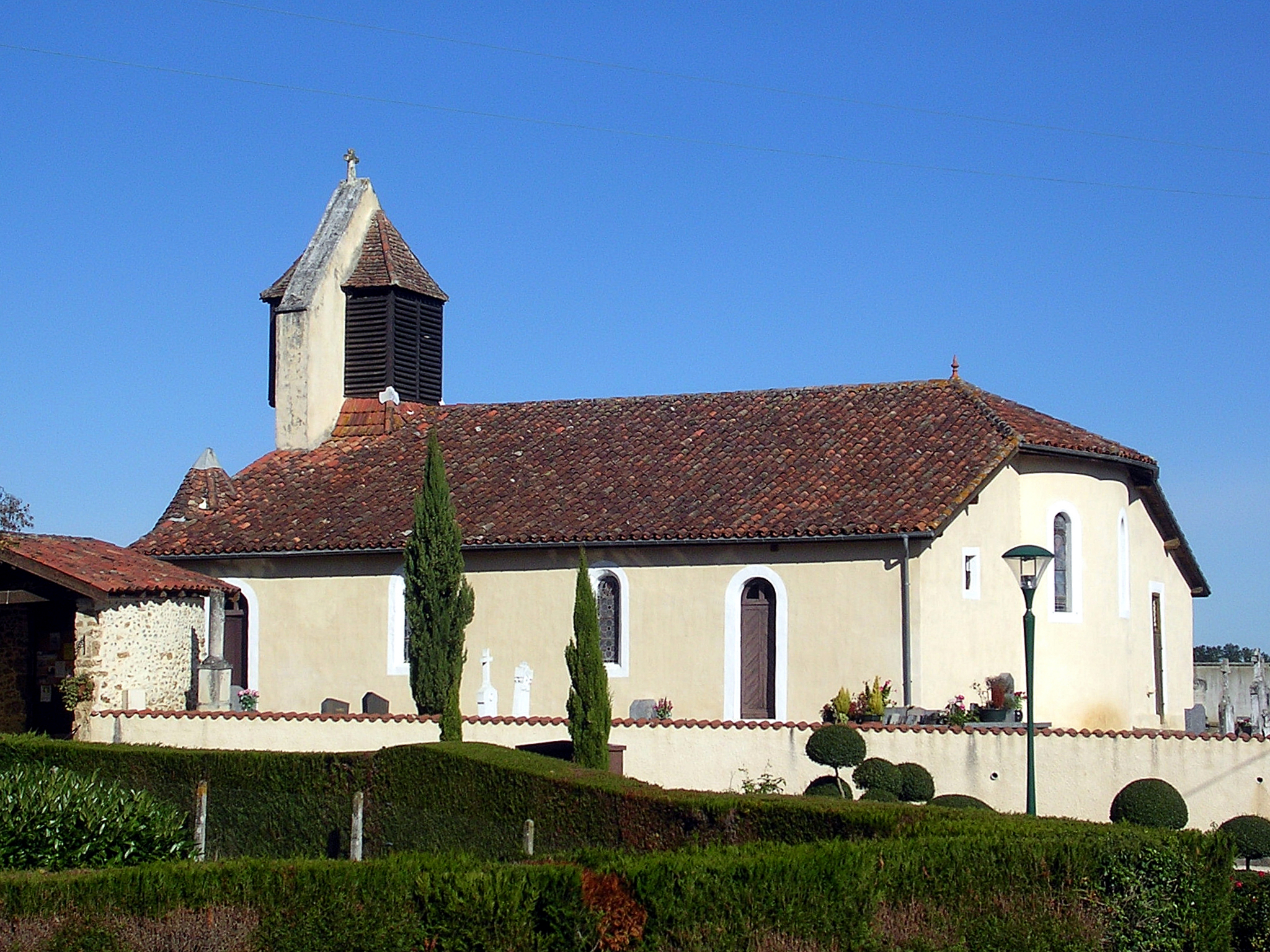
- The church in Le Leuy

- Coat of arms
- Location of Le Leuy
- Location within France Location within Nouvelle-Aquitaine
- Coordinates: 43°49′23″N 0°39′05″W
- Country: France
- Region: Nouvelle-Aquitaine
- Department: Landes
- Arrondissement: Dax
- Canton: Pays morcenais tarusate
- Intercommunality: Pays Tarusate

Government
  - Mayor (2020–2026): Thierry Bibes
- Area^{1}: 9.46 km^{2} (3.65 sq mi)
- Elevation: 66 m (217 ft)
- Highest elevation: 84 m (276 ft)
- Lowest elevation: 52 m (171 ft)
- Population (2023): 225
  - Density: 23.8/km^{2} (61.6/sq mi)
- Time zone: UTC+01:00 (CET)
  - Summer (DST): UTC+02:00 (CEST)
- INSEE/Postal code: 40153 /40250
- ^{1} French Land Register data, which excludes lakes, ponds, glaciers > 1 km^{2} (0.386 sq mi or 247 acres) and river estuaries.

Le Leuy (French pronunciation: [lə løi]; Occitan: Lo Lui, before 1962: Leuy) is a commune in the Landes department in Nouvelle-Aquitaine in south-western France.

== See also ==
- Communes of the Landes department
