= Beylongue =

- Commune
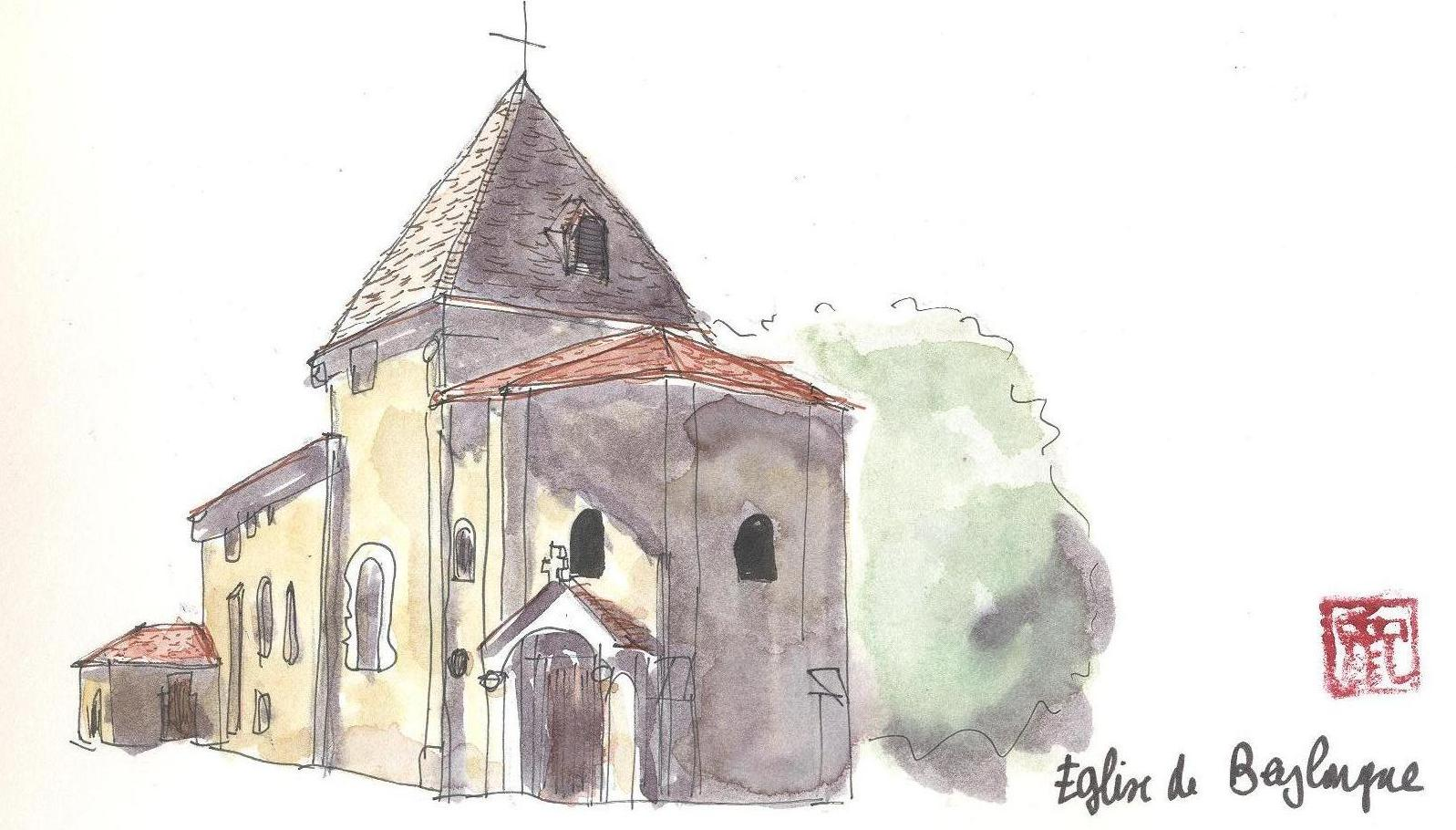
- The church of Beylongue
- Location of Beylongue
- Location within France Location within Nouvelle-Aquitaine
- Coordinates: 43°55′26″N 0°49′40″W
- Country: France
- Region: Nouvelle-Aquitaine
- Department: Landes
- Arrondissement: Dax
- Canton: Pays morcenais tarusate
- Intercommunality: Pays Tarusate

Government
  - Mayor (2023–2026): Jean Batby
- Area^{1}: 37.51 km^{2} (14.48 sq mi)
- Elevation: 92 m (302 ft)
- Highest elevation: 103 m (338 ft)
- Lowest elevation: 35 m (115 ft)
- Population (2023): 400
  - Density: 11/km^{2} (28/sq mi)
- Time zone: UTC+01:00 (CET)
  - Summer (DST): UTC+02:00 (CEST)
- INSEE/Postal code: 40040 /40370
- ^{1} French Land Register data, which excludes lakes, ponds, glaciers > 1 km^{2} (0.386 sq mi or 247 acres) and river estuaries.

Beylongue (French pronunciation: [belɔ̃ɡ]; Occitan: Vath Longa) is a commune in the Landes department in Nouvelle-Aquitaine in southwestern France.

== Population ==
Historical population
Year	Pop.	±% p.a.
1968	393	—
1975	372	−0.78%
1982	317	−2.26%
1990	305	−0.48%
1999	300	−0.18%
2007	331	+1.24%
2012	383	+2.96%
2017	365	−0.96%
2023	400	+1.54%
Source: INSEE

== See also ==
- Communes of the Landes department
