= Canton of Pays morcenais tarusate =

Coordinates: 43.83°N 0.81°W

The canton of Pays morcenais tarusate is an administrative division of the Landes department, southwestern France. It was created at the French canton reorganisation which came into effect in March 2015. Its seat is in Tartas.

It consists of the following communes:

1. Arengosse
2. Audon
3. Bégaar
4. Beylongue
5. Carcarès-Sainte-Croix
6. Carcen-Ponson
7. Gouts
8. Laluque
9. Lamothe
10. Lesgor
11. Lesperon
12. Le Leuy
13. Meilhan
14. Morcenx-la-Nouvelle
15. Onesse-Laharie
16. Ousse-Suzan
17. Pontonx-sur-l'Adour
18. Rion-des-Landes
19. Saint-Yaguen
20. Souprosse
21. Tartas
22. Villenave
23. Ygos-Saint-Saturnin
