= Arengosse =

- Commune
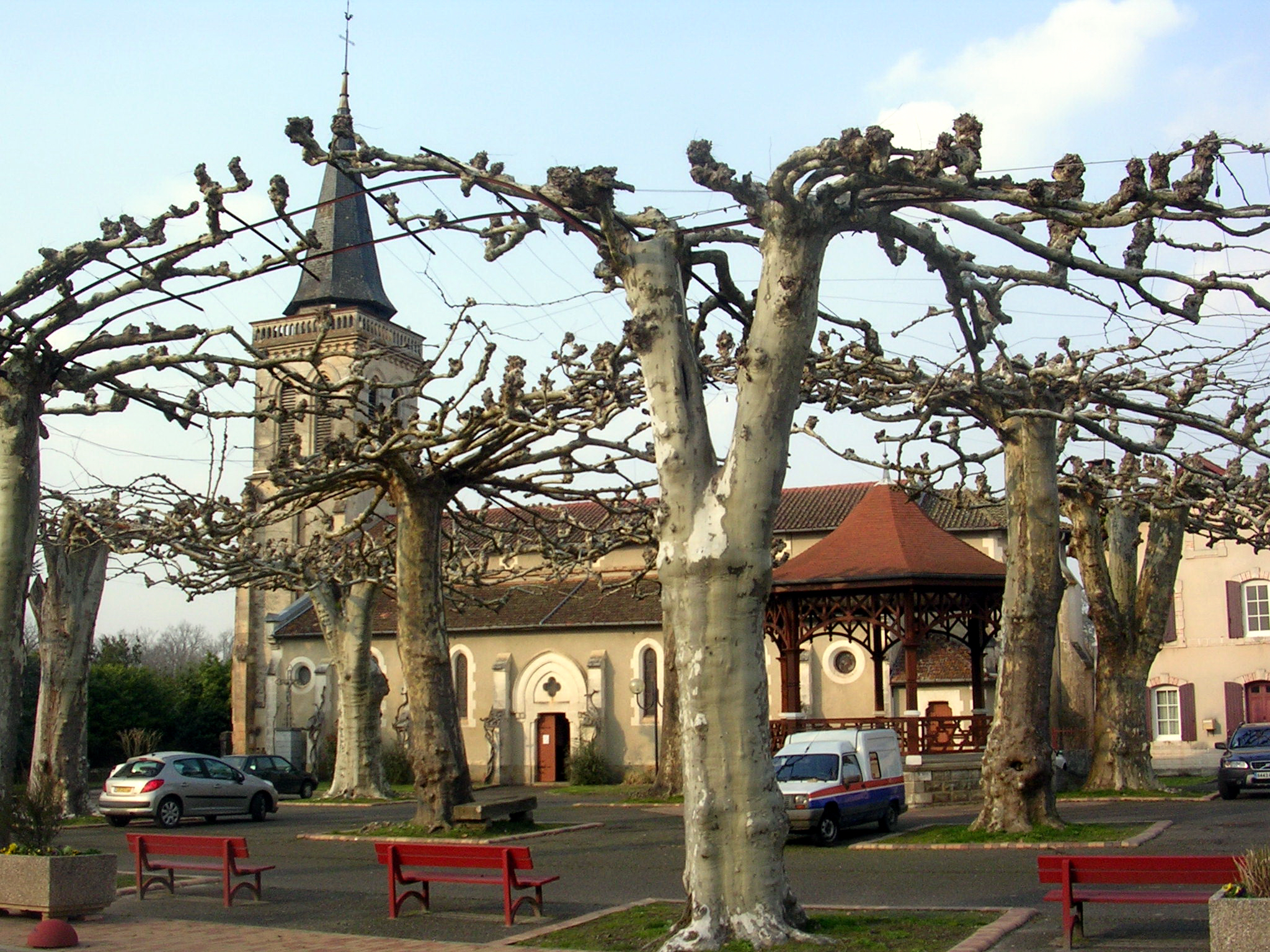
- The church of Arengosse
- Location of Arengosse
- Location within France Location within Nouvelle-Aquitaine
- Coordinates: 44°00′11″N 0°47′06″W
- Country: France
- Region: Nouvelle-Aquitaine
- Department: Landes
- Arrondissement: Mont-de-Marsan
- Canton: Pays morcenais tarusate
- Intercommunality: Pays Morcenais

Government
  - Mayor (2020–2026): Jean-Luc Dubroca
- Area^{1}: 62.48 km^{2} (24.12 sq mi)
- Elevation: 67 m (220 ft)
- Highest elevation: 102 m (335 ft)
- Lowest elevation: 32 m (105 ft)
- Population (2023): 711
  - Density: 11.4/km^{2} (29.5/sq mi)
- Time zone: UTC+01:00 (CET)
  - Summer (DST): UTC+02:00 (CEST)
- INSEE/Postal code: 40006 /40110
- ^{1} French Land Register data, which excludes lakes, ponds, glaciers > 1 km^{2} (0.386 sq mi or 247 acres) and river estuaries.

Arengosse (Arangòssa in Occitan) is a commune of the Landes department in Nouvelle-Aquitaine in southwestern France.

== Population ==
Historical population
Year	Pop.	±% p.a.
1968	778	—
1975	726	−0.98%
1982	711	−0.30%
1990	709	−0.04%
1999	676	−0.53%
2007	712	+0.65%
2012	704	−0.23%
2017	683	−0.60%
2023	711	+0.67%
Source: INSEE

== See also ==
- Communes of the Landes department
