= Souprosse =

- Commune
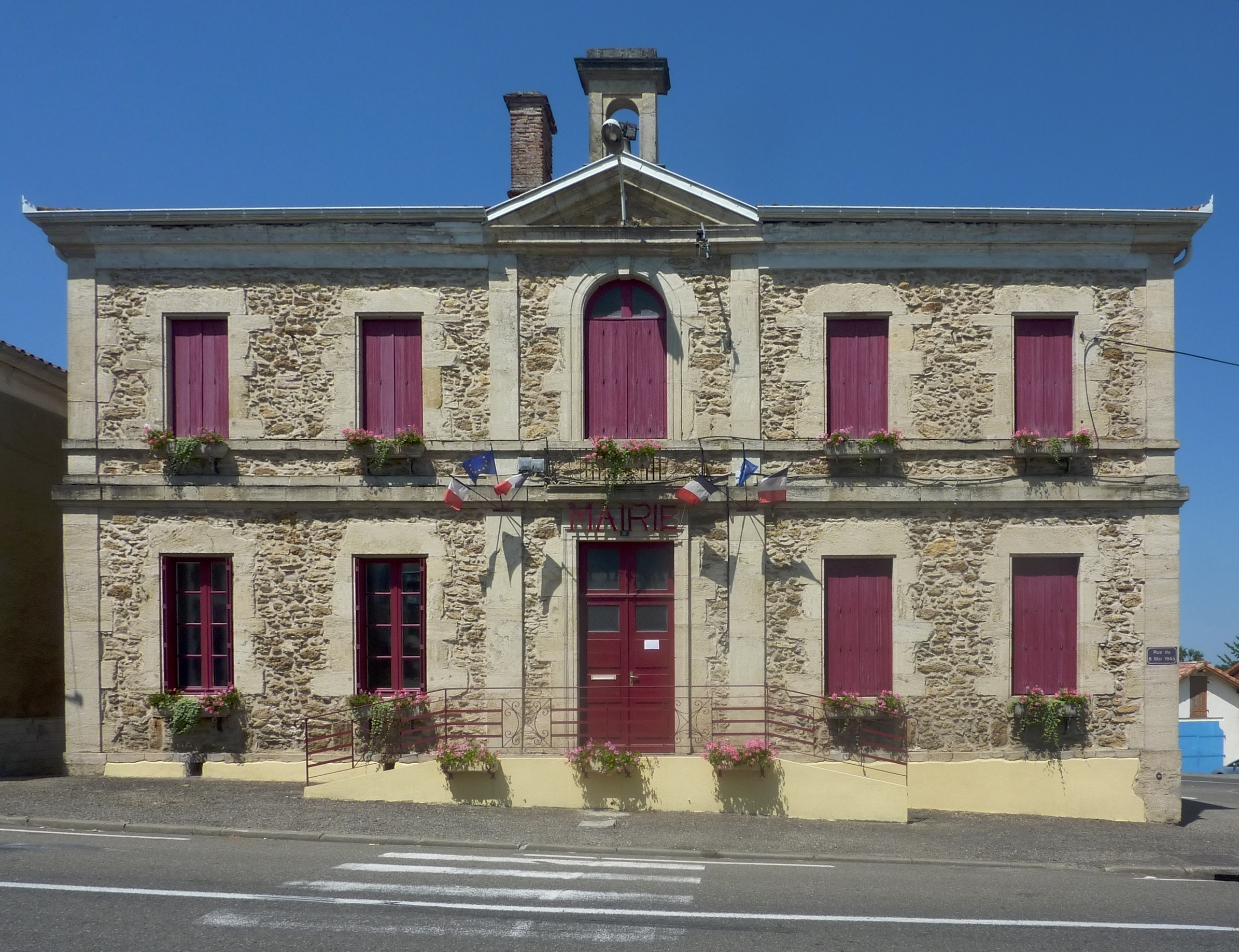
- Town hall
- Location of Souprosse
- Location within France Location within Nouvelle-Aquitaine
- Coordinates: 43°47′22″N 0°42′31″W
- Country: France
- Region: Nouvelle-Aquitaine
- Department: Landes
- Arrondissement: Dax
- Canton: Pays morcenais tarusate
- Intercommunality: Pays Tarusate

Government
  - Mayor (2020–2026): Christian Ducos
- Area^{1}: 42.56 km^{2} (16.43 sq mi)
- Elevation: 46 m (151 ft)
- Highest elevation: 84 m (276 ft)
- Lowest elevation: 15 m (49 ft)
- Population (2023): 1,184
  - Density: 27.82/km^{2} (72.05/sq mi)
- Time zone: UTC+01:00 (CET)
  - Summer (DST): UTC+02:00 (CEST)
- INSEE/Postal code: 40309 /40250
- ^{1} French Land Register data, which excludes lakes, ponds, glaciers > 1 km^{2} (0.386 sq mi or 247 acres) and river estuaries.

Souprosse (French pronunciation: [supʁɔs]; Occitan: Sopròssa) is a commune in the Landes department in Nouvelle-Aquitaine in southwestern France.

== Population ==
Historical population
Year	Pop.	±% p.a.
1968	1,176	—
1975	1,116	−0.75%
1982	1,148	+0.40%
1990	1,119	−0.32%
1999	1,068	−0.52%
2007	1,030	−0.45%
2012	1,053	+0.44%
2017	1,122	+1.28%
2023	1,184	+0.90%
Source: INSEE

== See also ==
- Communes of the Landes department
