= Ygos-Saint-Saturnin =

- Commune
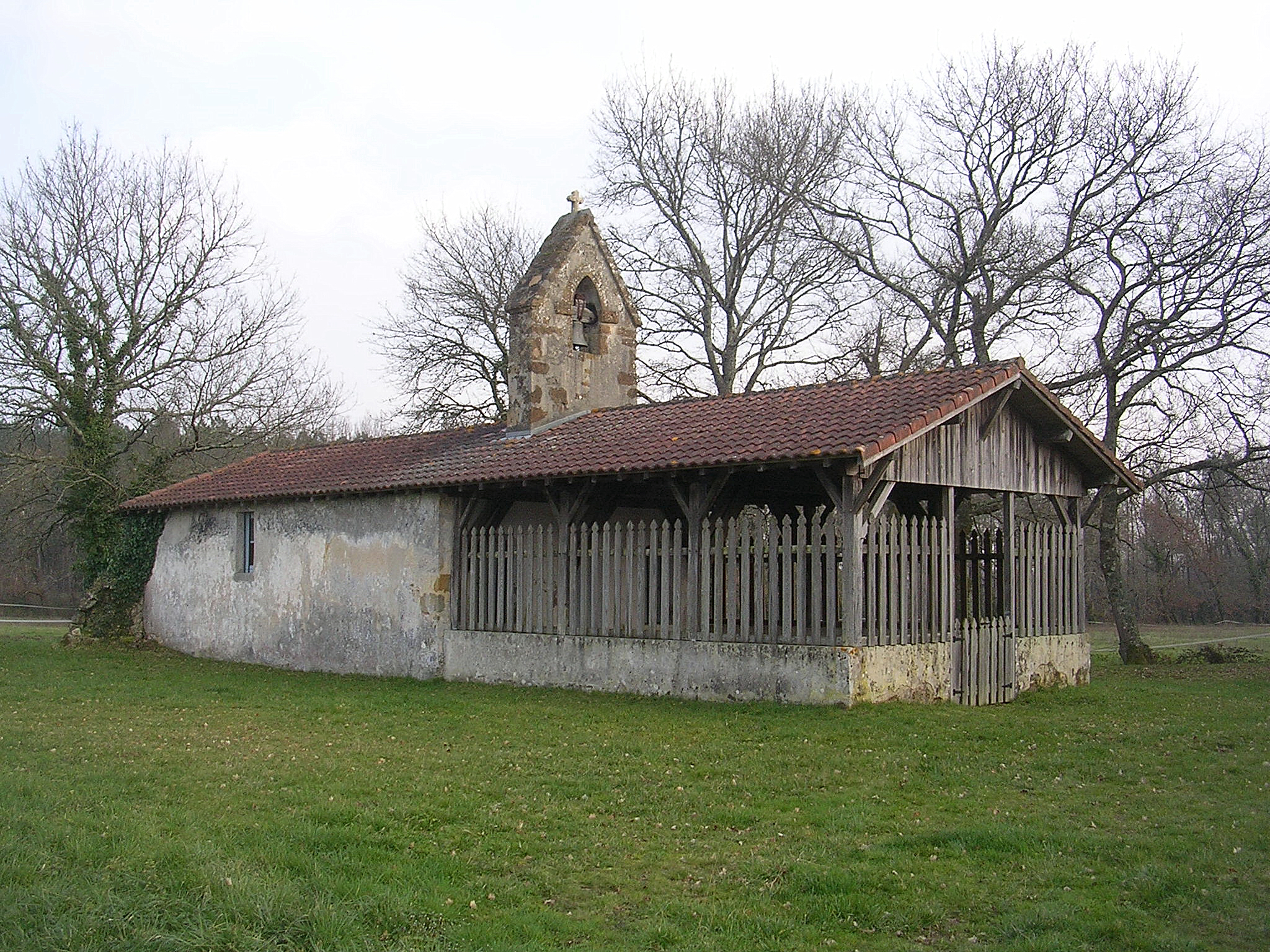
- Location of Ygos-Saint-Saturnin
- Location within France Location within Nouvelle-Aquitaine
- Coordinates: 43°58′37″N 0°44′08″W
- Country: France
- Region: Nouvelle-Aquitaine
- Department: Landes
- Arrondissement: Mont-de-Marsan
- Canton: Pays morcenais tarusate
- Intercommunality: Pays Morcenais

Government
  - Mayor (2020–2026): Jean-Pierre Remy
- Area^{1}: 57.88 km^{2} (22.35 sq mi)
- Elevation: 73 m (240 ft)
- Highest elevation: 101 m (331 ft)
- Lowest elevation: 44 m (144 ft)
- Population (2023): 1,334
  - Density: 23.05/km^{2} (59.69/sq mi)
- Time zone: UTC+01:00 (CET)
  - Summer (DST): UTC+02:00 (CEST)
- INSEE/Postal code: 40333 /40110
- Website: www.ygos.fr
- ^{1} French Land Register data, which excludes lakes, ponds, glaciers > 1 km^{2} (0.386 sq mi or 247 acres) and river estuaries.

Ygos-Saint-Saturnin (Gascon: Igòs e Sent Saturnin) is a commune in the Landes department in Nouvelle-Aquitaine in southwestern France.

== Population ==
Historical population
Year	Pop.	±% p.a.
1968	1,412	—
1975	1,420	+0.08%
1982	1,282	−1.45%
1990	1,207	−0.75%
1999	1,131	−0.72%
2007	1,123	−0.09%
2012	1,246	+2.10%
2017	1,322	+1.19%
2023	1,334	+0.15%
Source: INSEE

== History ==
The comune was created in 1822 at the merger of Ygos and Saint-Saturnin.

== See also ==
- Communes of the Landes department
