= Pomarez =

- Commune
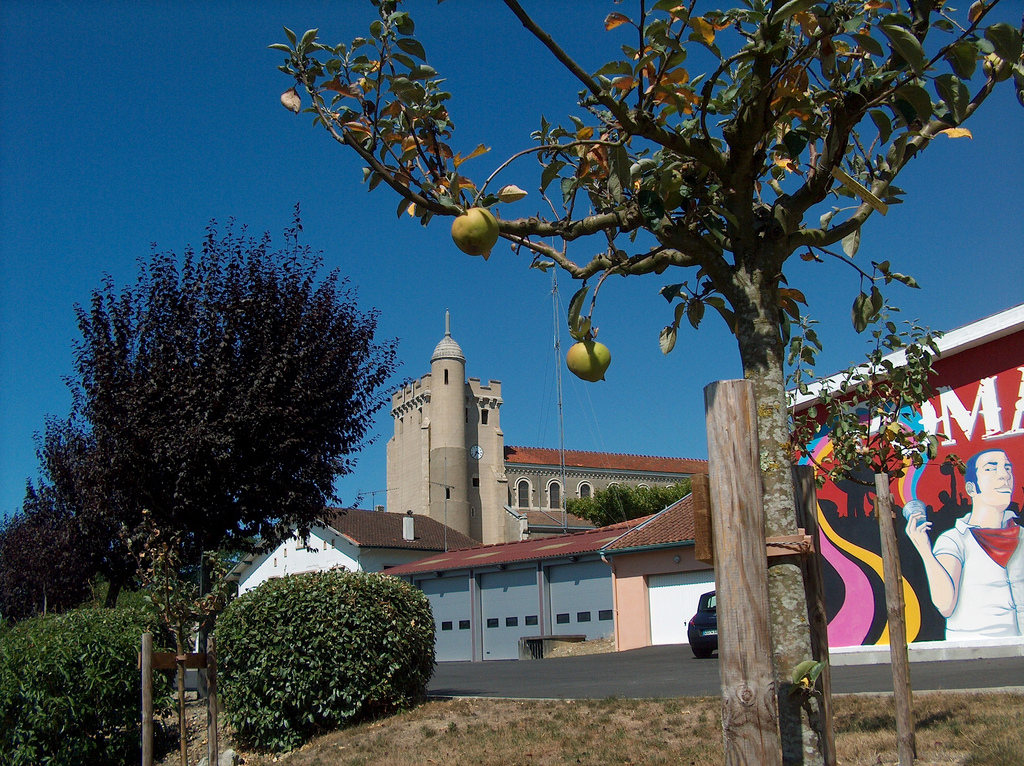
- Church tower and the fire station

- Coat of arms
- Location of Pomarez
- Location within France Location within Nouvelle-Aquitaine
- Coordinates: 43°37′50″N 0°49′41″W
- Country: France
- Region: Nouvelle-Aquitaine
- Department: Landes
- Arrondissement: Dax
- Canton: Coteau de Chalosse

Government
  - Mayor (2020–2026): Pascal Cassiau
- Area^{1}: 30.57 km^{2} (11.80 sq mi)
- Elevation: 49 m (161 ft)
- Highest elevation: 72 m (236 ft)
- Lowest elevation: 20 m (66 ft)
- Population (2023): 1,642
  - Density: 53.71/km^{2} (139.1/sq mi)
- Time zone: UTC+01:00 (CET)
  - Summer (DST): UTC+02:00 (CEST)
- INSEE/Postal code: 40228 /40360
- ^{1} French Land Register data, which excludes lakes, ponds, glaciers > 1 km^{2} (0.386 sq mi or 247 acres) and river estuaries.

Pomarez (French pronunciation: [pɔmaʁɛs]; Occitan: Pomarés) is a commune in the Landes department in Nouvelle-Aquitaine in southwestern France.

== Population ==
Historical population
Year	Pop.	±% p.a.
1968	1,379	—
1975	1,375	−0.04%
1982	1,344	−0.33%
1990	1,418	+0.67%
1999	1,448	+0.23%
2007	1,482	+0.29%
2012	1,500	+0.24%
2017	1,550	+0.66%
2023	1,642	+0.97%
Source: INSEE

== See also ==
- Communes of the Landes department
