= Saint-Yaguen =

- Commune
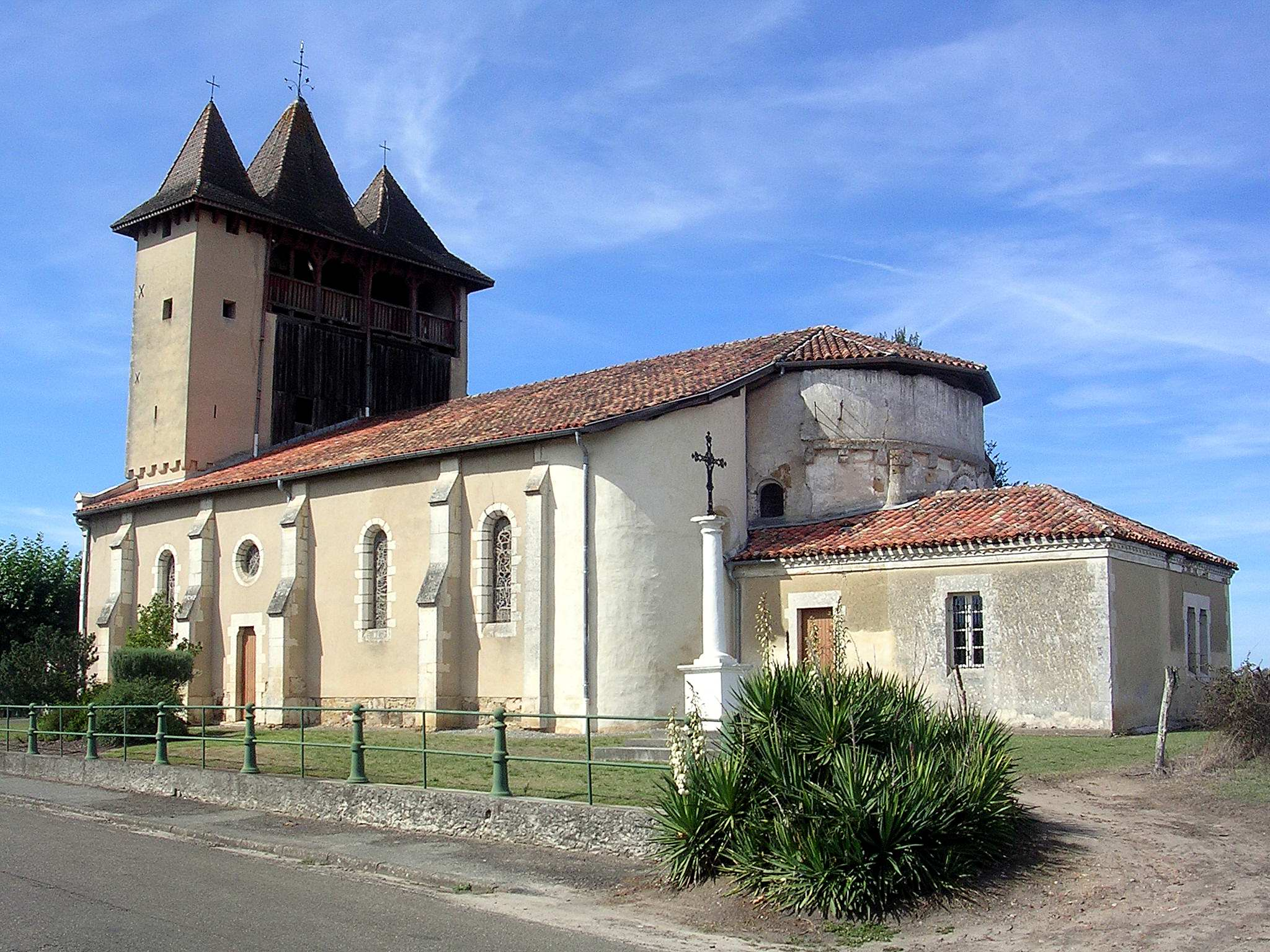
- Location of Saint-Yaguen
- Location within France Location within Nouvelle-Aquitaine
- Coordinates: 43°53′25″N 0°44′28″W
- Country: France
- Region: Nouvelle-Aquitaine
- Department: Landes
- Arrondissement: Dax
- Canton: Pays morcenais tarusate
- Intercommunality: Pays Tarusate

Government
  - Mayor (2023–2026): Jacques Larrieu
- Area^{1}: 37.59 km^{2} (14.51 sq mi)
- Elevation: 37 m (121 ft)
- Highest elevation: 57 m (187 ft)
- Lowest elevation: 15 m (49 ft)
- Population (2023): 625
  - Density: 16.6/km^{2} (43.1/sq mi)
- Time zone: UTC+01:00 (CET)
  - Summer (DST): UTC+02:00 (CEST)
- INSEE/Postal code: 40285 /40400
- ^{1} French Land Register data, which excludes lakes, ponds, glaciers > 1 km^{2} (0.386 sq mi or 247 acres) and river estuaries.

Saint-Yaguen (French pronunciation: [sɛ̃ jaɡɛn]; Occitan: Sent Jàguen) is a commune in the Landes department in Nouvelle-Aquitaine in southwestern France.

== Population ==
Historical population
Year	Pop.	±% p.a.
1968	558	—
1975	569	+0.28%
1982	507	−1.63%
1990	502	−0.12%
1999	458	−1.01%
2007	502	+1.15%
2012	590	+3.28%
2017	629	+1.29%
2023	625	−0.11%
Source: INSEE

== See also ==
- Communes of the Landes department
