= Lesperon =

- Commune
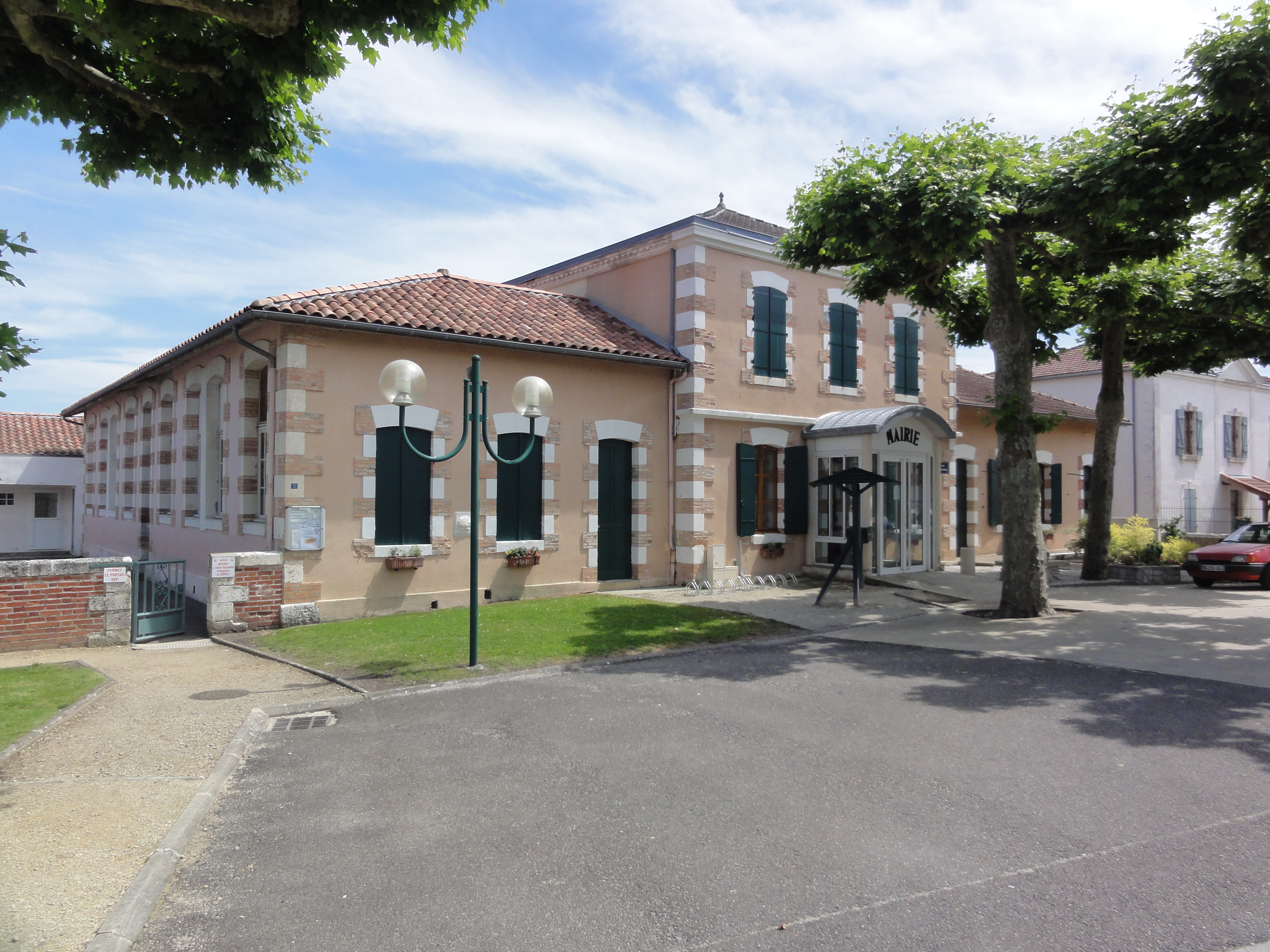
- The town hall in Lesperon
- Location of Lesperon
- Location within France Location within Nouvelle-Aquitaine
- Coordinates: 43°58′16″N 1°05′32″W
- Country: France
- Region: Nouvelle-Aquitaine
- Department: Landes
- Arrondissement: Mont-de-Marsan
- Canton: Pays morcenais tarusate
- Intercommunality: Pays Morcenais

Government
  - Mayor (2020–2026): Hélène Cousseau
- Area^{1}: 102.81 km^{2} (39.70 sq mi)
- Elevation: 70 m (230 ft)
- Highest elevation: 99 m (325 ft)
- Lowest elevation: 37 m (121 ft)
- Population (2023): 1,043
  - Density: 10.14/km^{2} (26.28/sq mi)
- Time zone: UTC+01:00 (CET)
  - Summer (DST): UTC+02:00 (CEST)
- INSEE/Postal code: 40152 /40260
- ^{1} French Land Register data, which excludes lakes, ponds, glaciers > 1 km^{2} (0.386 sq mi or 247 acres) and river estuaries.

Lesperon (French pronunciation: [lɛspəʁɔ̃]; Occitan: L'Esperon) is a commune in the Landes department in Nouvelle-Aquitaine in south-western France.

== Geography ==
Common located about 30 kilometres from the beaches of the Silver Coast, in the heart of the Landes Forest.

== History ==
Built on a height protected by a stream below the Vignacq. Its original name was Arrast (of "Arx", that is to say, citadel). Around 1305, Armanieu d'Albret, lord of this parish, asserts his authority by building a castle and a church. It is endowed with an imposing fortified tower-tower, equipped with bretèches, armed with loopholes and breakthrough of machicolations. It is supposed that around this church, there would have been four columns, vestiges gone from a savage. At that time Edward II of England pointed this place to his subjects as a dangerous place because of its important junction on a route to Santiago de Compostela, an important stop from where one can continue by the continuation is by Navarre and Roncesvalles, or by Biscay.

There is also a historical "legend" that says that at the time when Henry IV reigned, there was a hunting lodge where it came from time to time crossing to Pau via Orthez. During a hunt, however a very good rider, he lost his right heel spur which he missed greatly for the continuity of events. Also his desire to be alone, certainly still for a lover of the corner, he returned all his entourage [not clear] who escorted him to this search for his spur. Some say that this spur was of great value in view of the importance and the absolute desire to find it. To this day, the spur in question has never been found.

Place of passage of hunters, robbers and pilgrims of Saint-Jacques-de-Compostela, the place was pointed repeatedly as the village of the spur, hence the name of Lesperon.

== Economy ==
There is a Chemical factory of the DRT.

== Transport ==
There are a bus, car, truck, taxi, bike, motorbike.

== Sports ==
There are a club of Basketball, Rugby.

== Twinings ==
She does not have twinning

== Education ==
There are one primary school and Kindergarten

== See also ==
- Communes of the Landes department
