= Poyanne =

- Commune
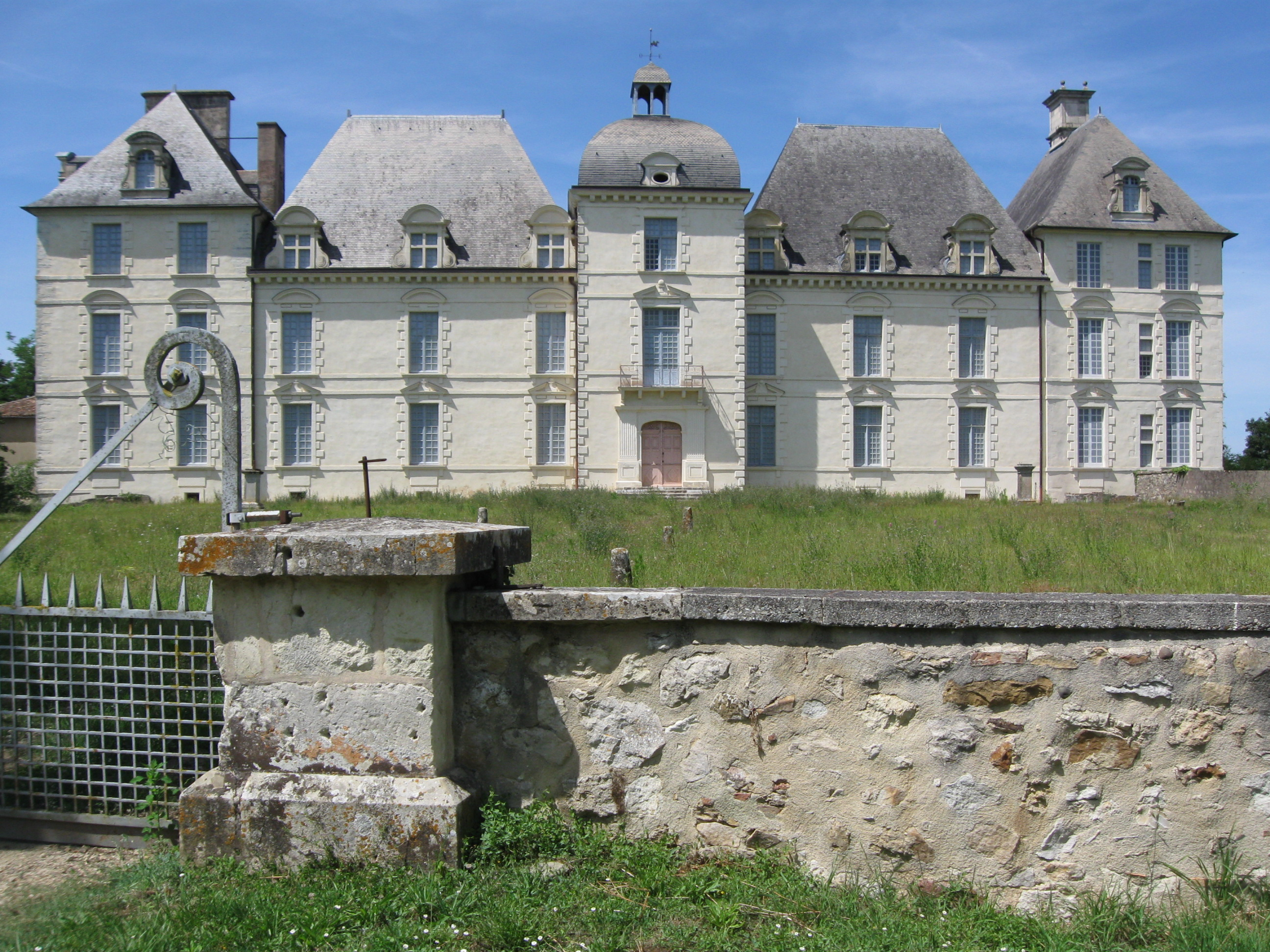
- Château de Poyanne
- Location of Poyanne
- Location within France Location within Nouvelle-Aquitaine
- Coordinates: 43°45′25″N 0°48′58″W
- Country: France
- Region: Nouvelle-Aquitaine
- Department: Landes
- Arrondissement: Dax
- Canton: Coteau de Chalosse

Government
  - Mayor (2020–2026): Fabienne Laby-Fauthoux
- Area^{1}: 10.72 km^{2} (4.14 sq mi)
- Elevation: 95 m (312 ft)
- Highest elevation: 99 m (325 ft)
- Lowest elevation: 12 m (39 ft)
- Population (2023): 693
  - Density: 64.6/km^{2} (167/sq mi)
- Time zone: UTC+01:00 (CET)
  - Summer (DST): UTC+02:00 (CEST)
- INSEE/Postal code: 40235 /40380
- ^{1} French Land Register data, which excludes lakes, ponds, glaciers > 1 km^{2} (0.386 sq mi or 247 acres) and river estuaries.

Poyanne (French pronunciation: [pɔjan]; Occitan: Poiana) is a commune in the Landes department in Nouvelle-Aquitaine in southwestern France.

== Population ==
Historical population
Year	Pop.	±% p.a.
1968	645	—
1975	584	−1.41%
1982	542	−1.06%
1990	516	−0.61%
1999	517	+0.02%
2007	563	+1.07%
2012	641	+2.63%
2017	688	+1.43%
2023	693	+0.12%
Source: INSEE

== See also ==
- Communes of the Landes department
