= Pontonx-sur-l'Adour =

- Commune
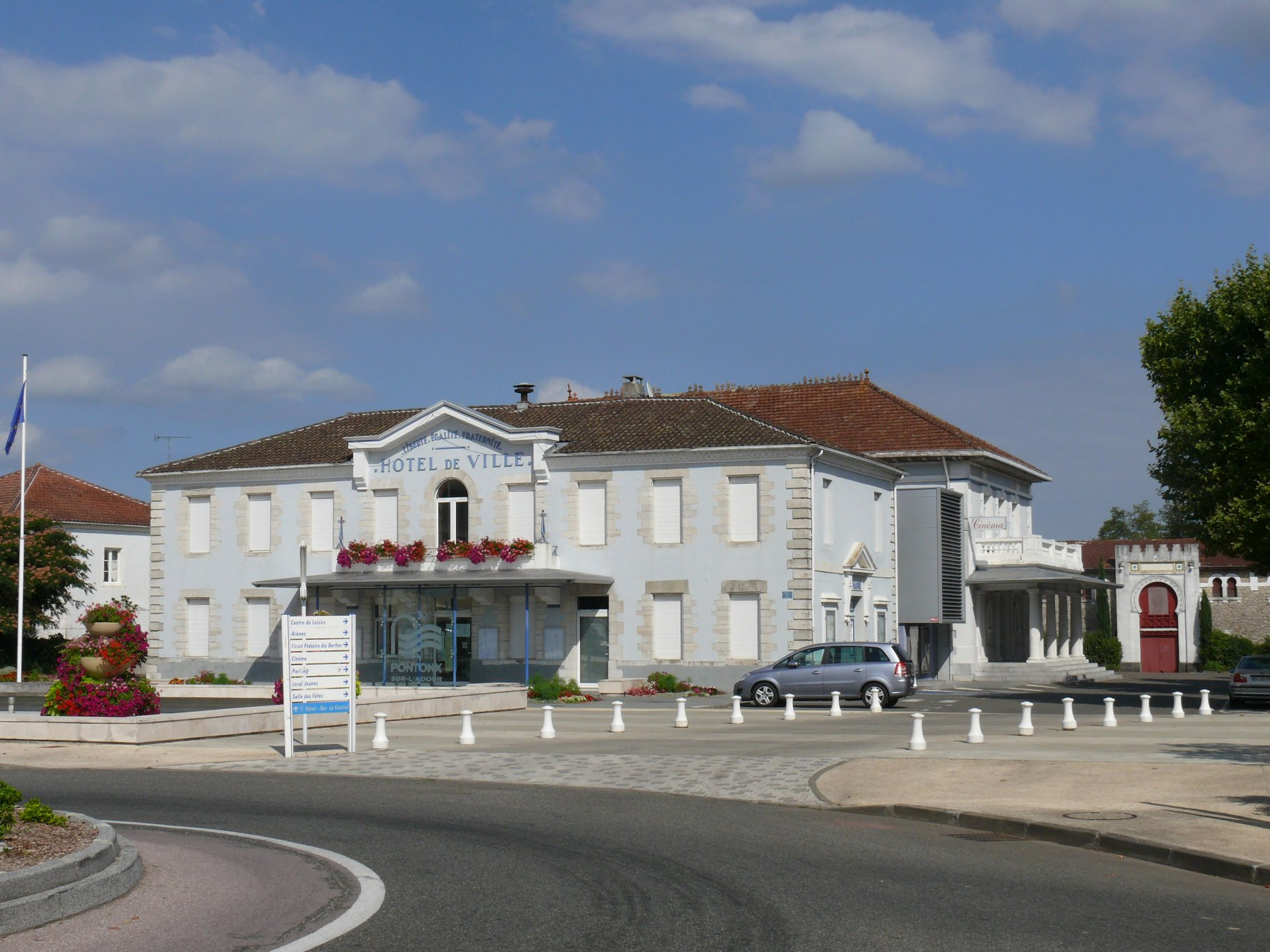
- Town hall
- Location of Pontonx-sur-l'Adour
- Location within France Location within Nouvelle-Aquitaine
- Coordinates: 43°47′20″N 0°55′30″W
- Country: France
- Region: Nouvelle-Aquitaine
- Department: Landes
- Arrondissement: Dax
- Canton: Pays morcenais tarusate
- Intercommunality: Pays Tarusate

Government
  - Mayor (2020–2026): Dominique Urolategui
- Area^{1}: 49.42 km^{2} (19.08 sq mi)
- Elevation: 26 m (85 ft)
- Highest elevation: 75 m (246 ft)
- Lowest elevation: 5 m (16 ft)
- Population (2023): 3,021
  - Density: 61.13/km^{2} (158.3/sq mi)
- Time zone: UTC+01:00 (CET)
  - Summer (DST): UTC+02:00 (CEST)
- INSEE/Postal code: 40230 /40465
- ^{1} French Land Register data, which excludes lakes, ponds, glaciers > 1 km^{2} (0.386 sq mi or 247 acres) and river estuaries.

Pontonx-sur-l'Adour (French pronunciation: [pɔ̃tɔ̃ks syʁ laduʁ], literally Pontonx on the Adour; Occitan: Pontons d'Ador) is a commune in the Landes department in Nouvelle-Aquitaine in southwestern France.

== Population ==
Historical population

Year	Pop.	±% p.a.
1793	894	—
1821	1,137	+0.86%
1846	1,542	+1.23%
1872	1,904	+0.81%
1901	1,982	+0.14%
1926	1,785	−0.42%
1946	1,608	−0.52%
1962	1,652	+0.17%
1968	1,620	−0.33%

Year	Pop.	±% p.a.
1975	1,659	+0.34%
1982	1,638	−0.18%
1990	1,887	+1.78%
1999	2,071	+1.04%
2007	2,367	+1.68%
2012	2,592	+1.83%
2017	2,810	+1.63%
2023	3,021	+1.21%

Source: EHESS and INSEE (1968-2023)

== See also ==
- Communes of the Landes department
