= Onesse-Laharie =

- Commune
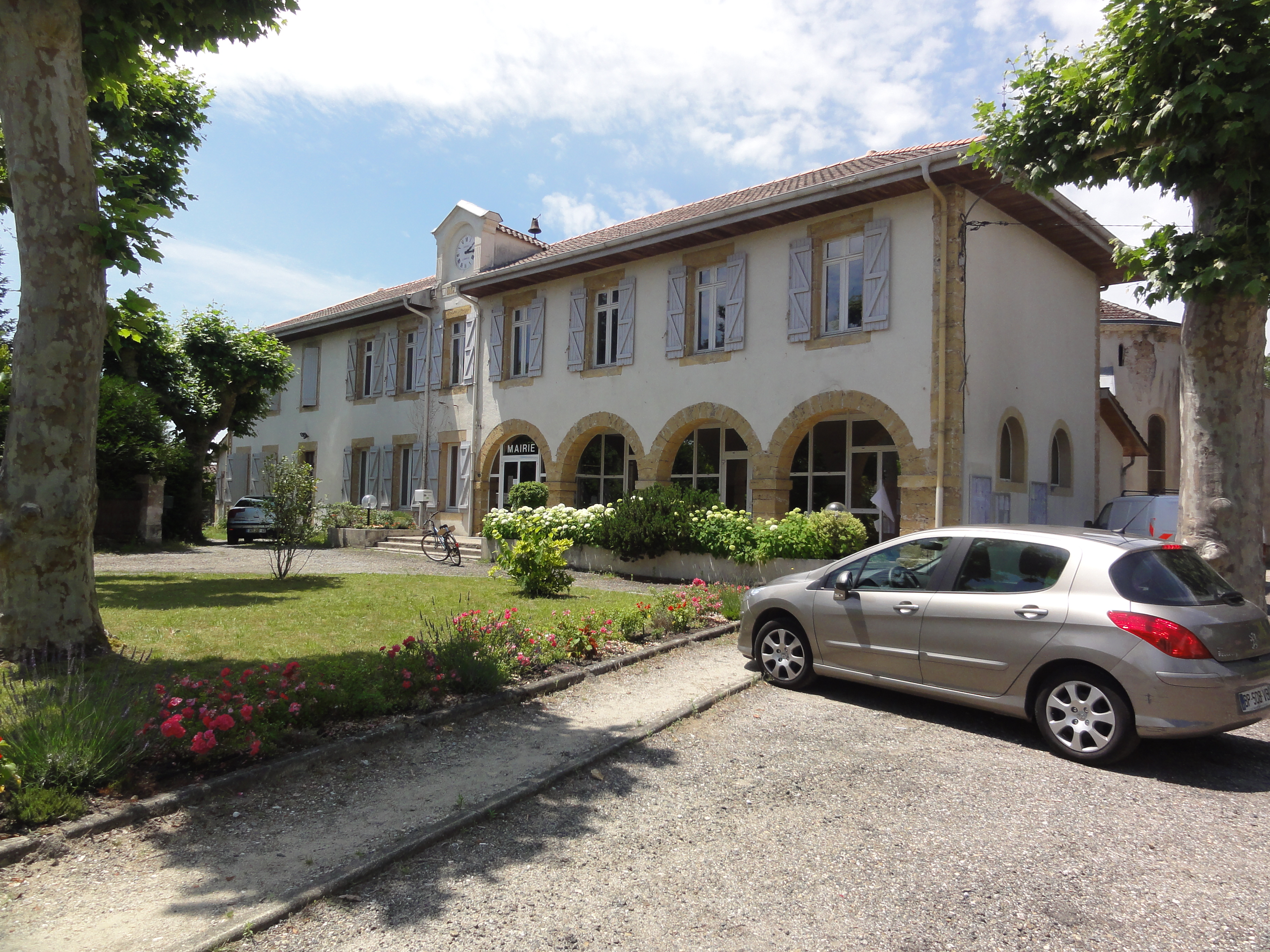
- Town hall
- Location of Onesse-Laharie
- Location within France Location within Nouvelle-Aquitaine
- Coordinates: 44°03′44″N 1°04′05″W
- Country: France
- Region: Nouvelle-Aquitaine
- Department: Landes
- Arrondissement: Mont-de-Marsan
- Canton: Pays morcenais tarusate
- Intercommunality: Pays Morcenais

Government
  - Mayor (2020–2026): Frédéric Pradère
- Area^{1}: 132.13 km^{2} (51.02 sq mi)
- Elevation: 39 m (128 ft)
- Highest elevation: 96 m (315 ft)
- Lowest elevation: 22 m (72 ft)
- Population (2023): 1,079
  - Density: 8.166/km^{2} (21.15/sq mi)
- Time zone: UTC+01:00 (CET)
  - Summer (DST): UTC+02:00 (CEST)
- INSEE/Postal code: 40210 /40110
- ^{1} French Land Register data, which excludes lakes, ponds, glaciers > 1 km^{2} (0.386 sq mi or 247 acres) and river estuaries.

Onesse-Laharie (French pronunciation: [ɔnɛs la.aʁi], before 2013: Onesse-et-Laharie; Occitan: Onessa e Laharí) is a commune in the Landes department in Nouvelle-Aquitaine in southwestern France.

== Population ==
Historical population
Year	Pop.	±% p.a.
1968	904	—
1975	911	+0.11%
1982	966	+0.84%
1990	981	+0.19%
1999	927	−0.63%
2007	941	+0.19%
2012	967	+0.55%
2017	1,009	+0.85%
2023	1,079	+1.12%
Source: INSEE

== See also ==
- Communes of the Landes department
