= Laluque =

- Commune
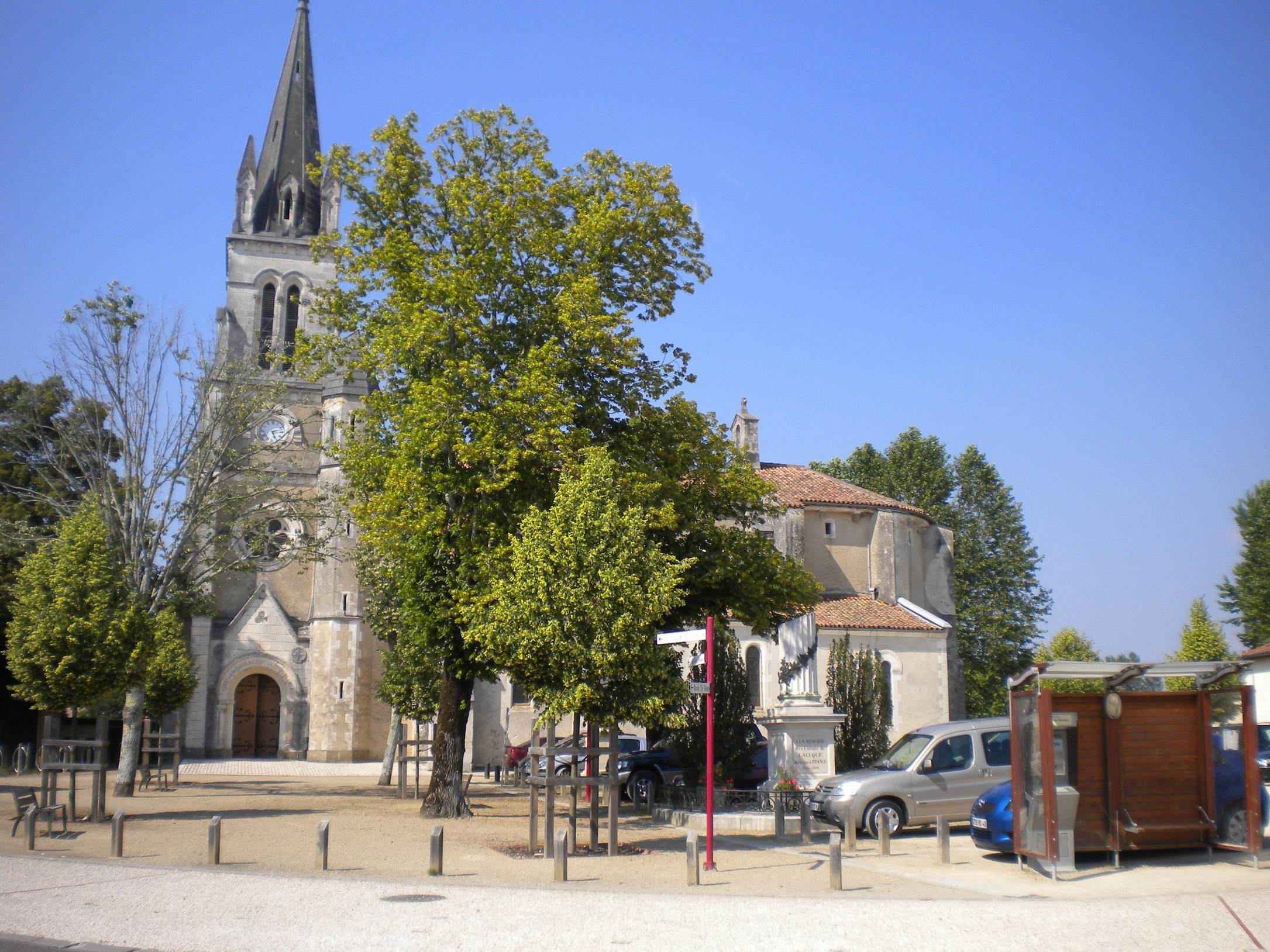
- The church in Laluque
- Location of Laluque
- Location within France Location within Nouvelle-Aquitaine
- Coordinates: 43°51′17″N 0°59′30″W
- Country: France
- Region: Nouvelle-Aquitaine
- Department: Landes
- Arrondissement: Dax
- Canton: Pays morcenais tarusate
- Intercommunality: Pays Tarusate

Government
  - Mayor (2020–2026): Christophe Martinez
- Area^{1}: 52.81 km^{2} (20.39 sq mi)
- Elevation: 62 m (203 ft)
- Highest elevation: 86 m (282 ft)
- Lowest elevation: 38 m (125 ft)
- Population (2023): 1,102
  - Density: 20.87/km^{2} (54.05/sq mi)
- Time zone: UTC+01:00 (CET)
  - Summer (DST): UTC+02:00 (CEST)
- INSEE/Postal code: 40142 /40465
- ^{1} French Land Register data, which excludes lakes, ponds, glaciers > 1 km^{2} (0.386 sq mi or 247 acres) and river estuaries.

Laluque (French pronunciation: [lalyk]; Gascon: La Luca) is a commune in the Landes department in Nouvelle-Aquitaine in south-western France.

== Toponymy ==
Laluque comes from the Latin word Lucus, which means sacred wood in Latin.

== Education ==
Laluque includes a nursery school of 73 students located at 50 avenue Fontaine, in area A.

== Economy ==
Formerly marked by forestry activity and the exploitation of lignite deposits, Laluque owes its development to the Paris-Hendaye railway line.

== See also ==
- Communes of the Landes department
