= Meilhan, Landes =

Meilhan
- Commune
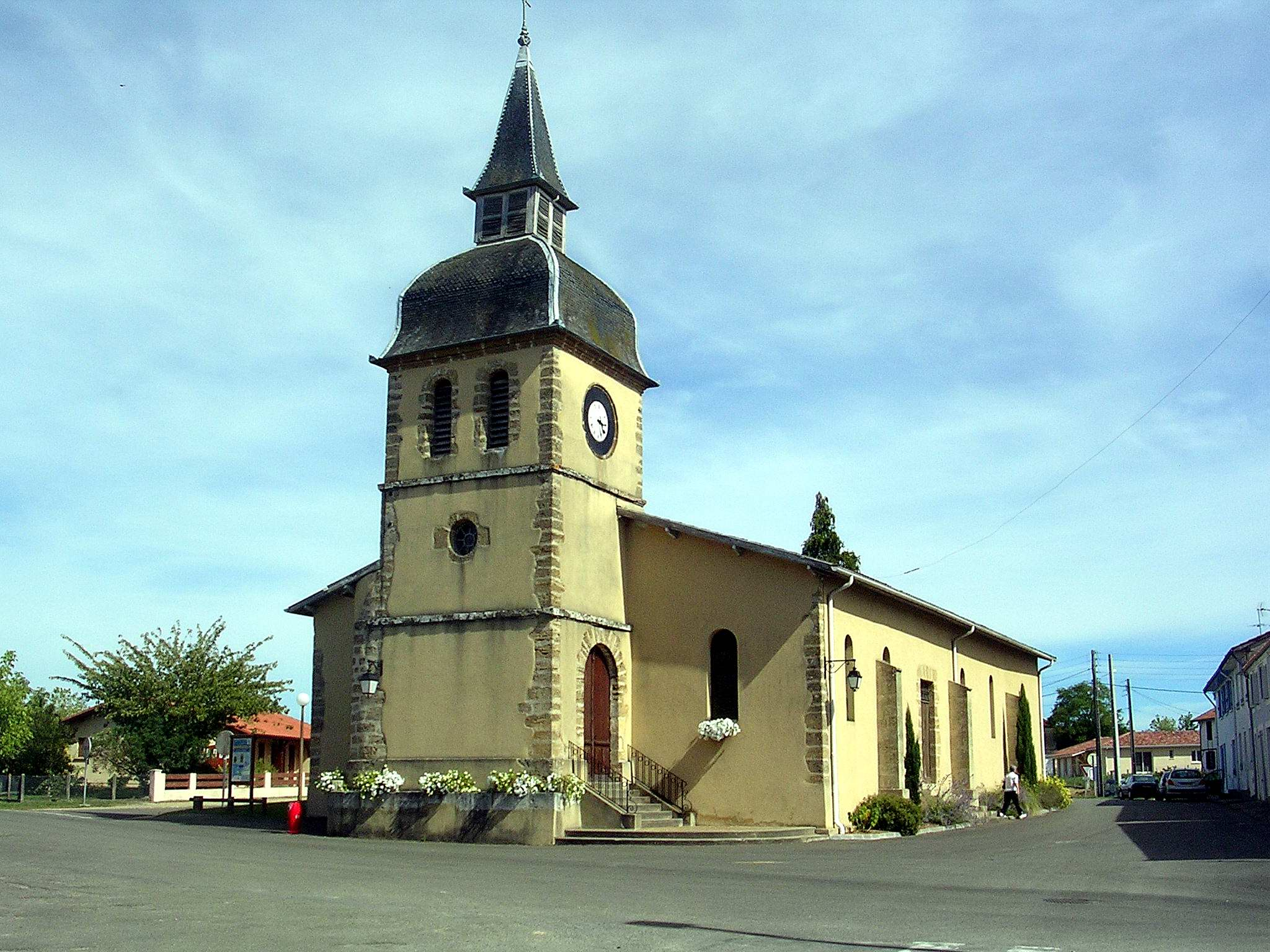
- The church in Meilhan
- Location of Meilhan
- Location within France Location within Nouvelle-Aquitaine
- Coordinates: 43°51′52″N 0°42′19″W
- Country: France
- Region: Nouvelle-Aquitaine
- Department: Landes
- Arrondissement: Dax
- Canton: Pays morcenais tarusate
- Intercommunality: Pays Tarusate

Government
  - Mayor (2020–2026): Patricia Loubere
- Area^{1}: 39.07 km^{2} (15.09 sq mi)
- Elevation: 61 m (200 ft)
- Highest elevation: 84 m (276 ft)
- Lowest elevation: 18 m (59 ft)
- Population (2023): 1,237
  - Density: 31.66/km^{2} (82.00/sq mi)
- Time zone: UTC+01:00 (CET)
  - Summer (DST): UTC+02:00 (CEST)
- INSEE/Postal code: 40180 /40400
- ^{1} French Land Register data, which excludes lakes, ponds, glaciers > 1 km^{2} (0.386 sq mi or 247 acres) and river estuaries.

Meilhan (French pronunciation: [mɛjɑ̃]; Occitan: Melhan) is a commune in the Landes department in Nouvelle-Aquitaine in south-western France.

== See also ==
- Communes of the Landes department
