= Lesgor =

- Commune
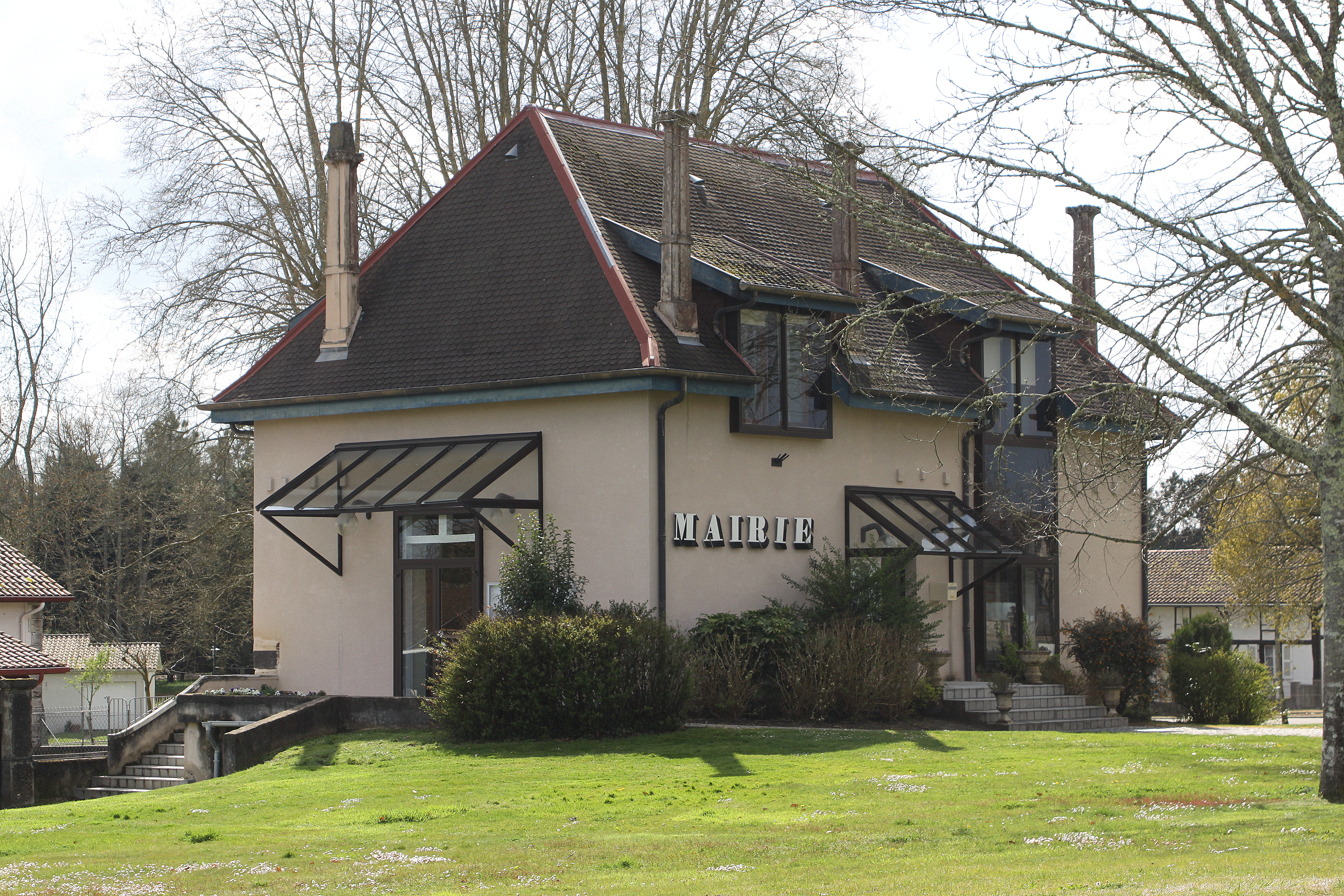
- The town hall in Lesgor
- Location of Lesgor
- Location within France Location within Nouvelle-Aquitaine
- Coordinates: 43°51′12″N 0°54′00″W
- Country: France
- Region: Nouvelle-Aquitaine
- Department: Landes
- Arrondissement: Dax
- Canton: Pays morcenais tarusate
- Intercommunality: Pays Tarusate

Government
  - Mayor (2020–2026): Patrick Postis
- Area^{1}: 28.19 km^{2} (10.88 sq mi)
- Elevation: 62 m (203 ft)
- Highest elevation: 75 m (246 ft)
- Lowest elevation: 17 m (56 ft)
- Population (2023): 427
  - Density: 15.1/km^{2} (39.2/sq mi)
- Time zone: UTC+01:00 (CET)
  - Summer (DST): UTC+02:00 (CEST)
- INSEE/Postal code: 40151 /40400
- ^{1} French Land Register data, which excludes lakes, ponds, glaciers > 1 km^{2} (0.386 sq mi or 247 acres) and river estuaries.

Lesgor (French pronunciation: [lɛsɡɔʁ]; Occitan: Lesgòr) is a commune in the Landes department in Nouvelle-Aquitaine in south-western France.

== See also ==
- Communes of the Landes department
