= Ousse-Suzan =

- Commune
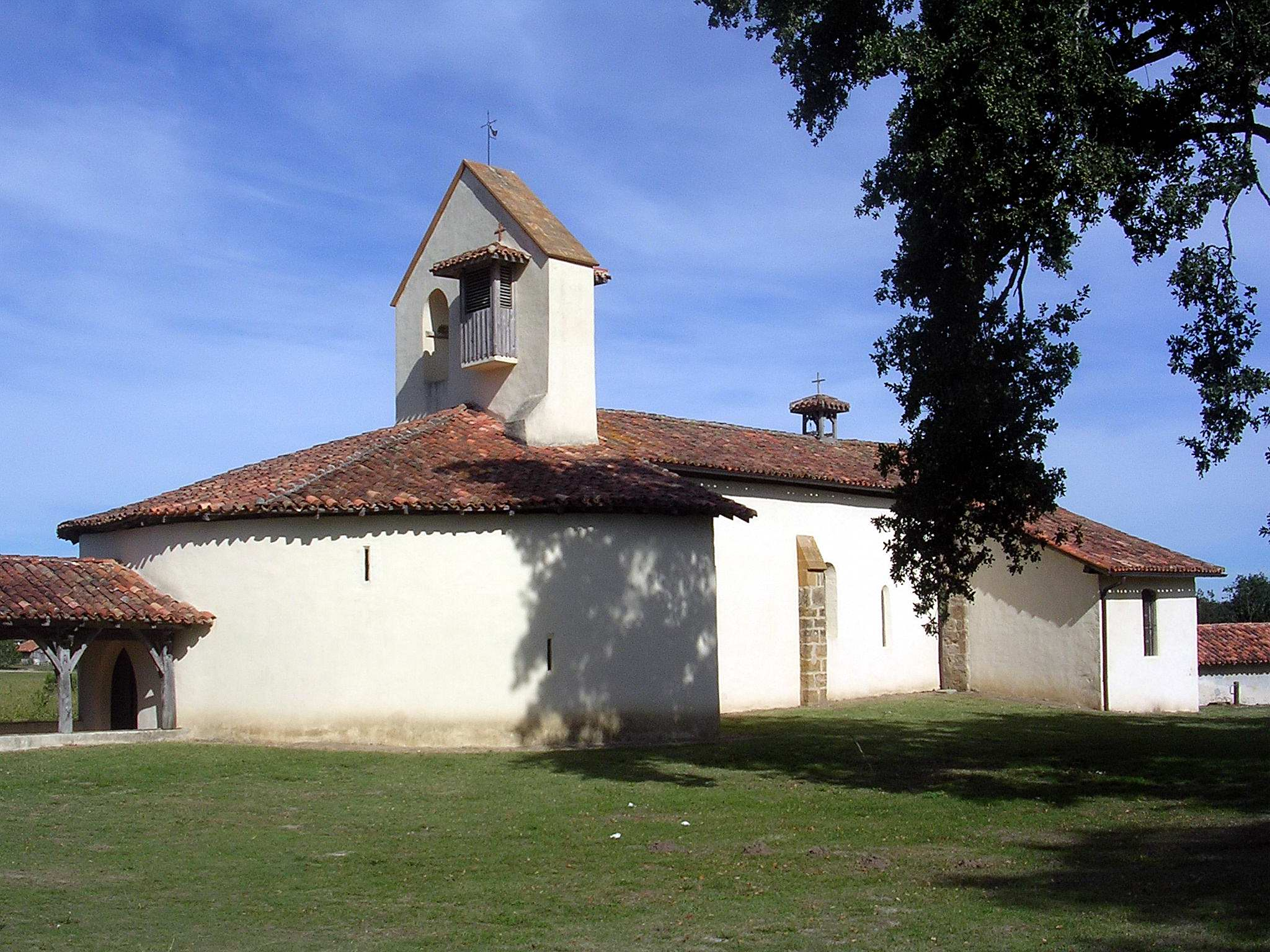
- Church of Saint-Jean-Baptiste
- Location of Ousse-Suzan
- Location within France Location within Nouvelle-Aquitaine
- Coordinates: 43°57′25″N 0°45′39″W
- Country: France
- Region: Nouvelle-Aquitaine
- Department: Landes
- Arrondissement: Mont-de-Marsan
- Canton: Pays morcenais tarusate
- Intercommunality: Pays Morcenais

Government
  - Mayor (2020–2026): Jacky Persillon
- Area^{1}: 24.48 km^{2} (9.45 sq mi)
- Elevation: 62 m (203 ft)
- Highest elevation: 96 m (315 ft)
- Lowest elevation: 22 m (72 ft)
- Population (2023): 297
  - Density: 12.1/km^{2} (31.4/sq mi)
- Time zone: UTC+01:00 (CET)
  - Summer (DST): UTC+02:00 (CEST)
- INSEE/Postal code: 40215 /40110
- ^{1} French Land Register data, which excludes lakes, ponds, glaciers > 1 km^{2} (0.386 sq mi or 247 acres) and river estuaries.

Ousse-Suzan (French pronunciation: [us syzɑ̃]; Occitan: Ossa e Susan, before 1962: Ousse-et-Suzan) is a commune in the Landes department in Nouvelle-Aquitaine in southwestern France.

== Population ==
Historical population
Year	Pop.	±% p.a.
1968	294	—
1975	254	−2.07%
1982	271	+0.93%
1990	292	+0.94%
1999	252	−1.62%
2007	239	−0.66%
2012	253	+1.15%
2017	277	+1.83%
2023	297	+1.17%
Source: INSEE

== See also ==
- Communes of the Landes department
