= Préchacq-les-Bains =

- Commune
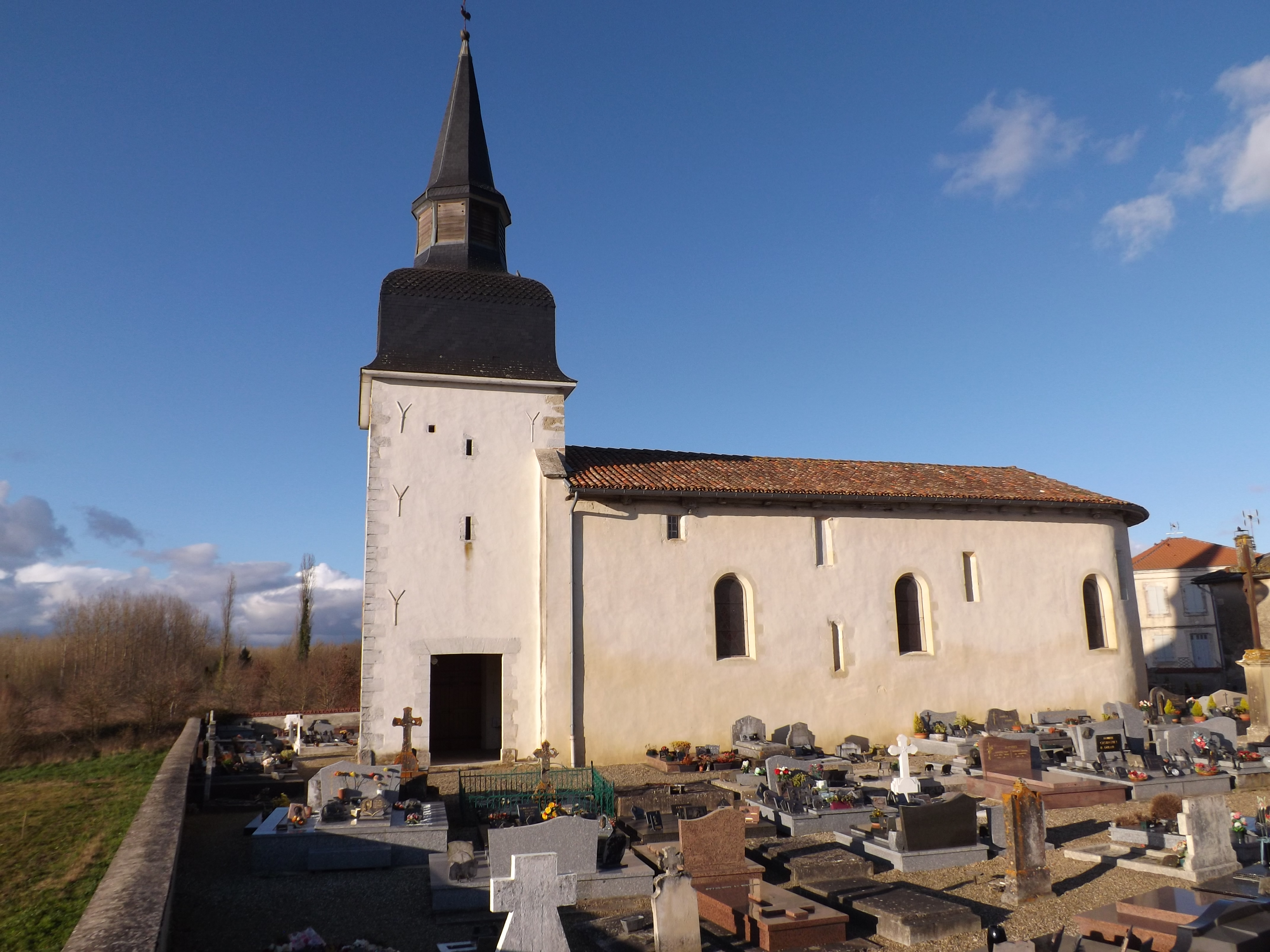

- Coat of arms
- Location of Préchacq-les-Bains
- Location within France Location within Nouvelle-Aquitaine
- Coordinates: 43°45′33″N 0°54′26″W
- Country: France
- Region: Nouvelle-Aquitaine
- Department: Landes
- Arrondissement: Dax
- Canton: Coteau de Chalosse

Government
  - Mayor (2020–2026): Daniel Caseneuve
- Area^{1}: 8.63 km^{2} (3.33 sq mi)
- Elevation: 20 m (66 ft)
- Highest elevation: 36 m (118 ft)
- Lowest elevation: 5 m (16 ft)
- Population (2023): 808
  - Density: 93.6/km^{2} (242/sq mi)
- Time zone: UTC+01:00 (CET)
  - Summer (DST): UTC+02:00 (CEST)
- INSEE/Postal code: 40237 /40465
- ^{1} French Land Register data, which excludes lakes, ponds, glaciers > 1 km^{2} (0.386 sq mi or 247 acres) and river estuaries.

Préchacq-les-Bains (French pronunciation: [pʁeʃak le bɛ̃]; Occitan: Preishac) is a commune in the Landes department in Nouvelle-Aquitaine in southwestern France.

== Population ==
Historical population

| Year | Pop. | ±% p.a. |
|---|---|---|
| 1793 | 411 | — |
| 1821 | 555 | +1.08% |
| 1846 | 616 | +0.42% |
| 1872 | 635 | +0.12% |
| 1901 | 648 | +0.07% |
| 1926 | 530 | −0.80% |
| 1946 | 502 | −0.27% |
| 1962 | 465 | −0.48% |
| 1968 | 471 | +0.21% |

| Year | Pop. | ±% p.a. |
|---|---|---|
| 1975 | 452 | −0.59% |
| 1982 | 428 | −0.78% |
| 1990 | 462 | +0.96% |
| 1999 | 462 | +0.00% |
| 2007 | 583 | +2.95% |
| 2012 | 682 | +3.19% |
| 2017 | 733 | +1.45% |
| 2023 | 808 | +1.64% |

Source: EHESS and INSEE (1968–2023)

== See also ==
- Communes of the Landes department
