= Carcarès-Sainte-Croix =

- Commune
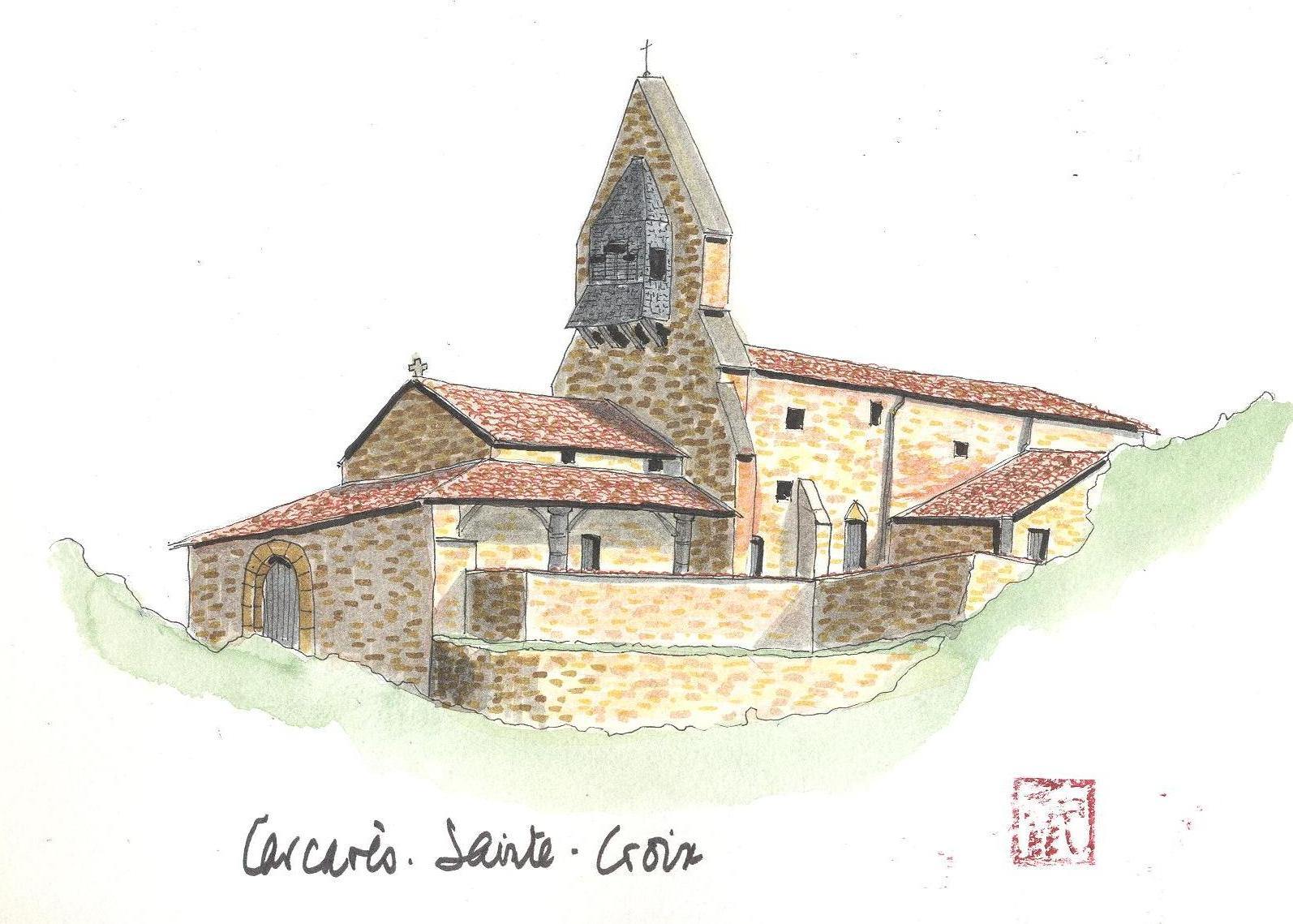
- Watercolor of the church

- Coat of arms
- Location of Carcarès-Sainte-Croix
- Location within France Location within Nouvelle-Aquitaine
- Coordinates: 43°50′33″N 0°47′24″W
- Country: France
- Region: Nouvelle-Aquitaine
- Department: Landes
- Arrondissement: Dax
- Canton: Pays morcenais tarusate
- Intercommunality: Pays Tarusate

Government
  - Mayor (2020–2026): Michèle Prosper
- Area^{1}: 15.57 km^{2} (6.01 sq mi)
- Elevation: 34 m (112 ft)
- Highest elevation: 74 m (243 ft)
- Lowest elevation: 14 m (46 ft)
- Population (2023): 533
  - Density: 34.2/km^{2} (88.7/sq mi)
- Time zone: UTC+01:00 (CET)
  - Summer (DST): UTC+02:00 (CEST)
- INSEE/Postal code: 40066 /40400
- ^{1} French Land Register data, which excludes lakes, ponds, glaciers > 1 km^{2} (0.386 sq mi or 247 acres) and river estuaries.

Carcarès-Sainte-Croix (French pronunciation: [kaʁkaʁɛs sɛ̃t kʁwa]; Gascon: Carcarèrs e Senta Crotz) is a commune in the Landes department in Nouvelle-Aquitaine in southwestern France.

== Population ==
Historical population
Year	Pop.	±% p.a.
1968	405	—
1975	379	−0.94%
1982	407	+1.02%
1990	426	+0.57%
1999	434	+0.21%
2007	473	+1.08%
2012	504	+1.28%
2017	519	+0.59%
2023	533	+0.44%
Source: INSEE

== See also ==
- Communes of the Landes department
