= Laurède =

- Commune
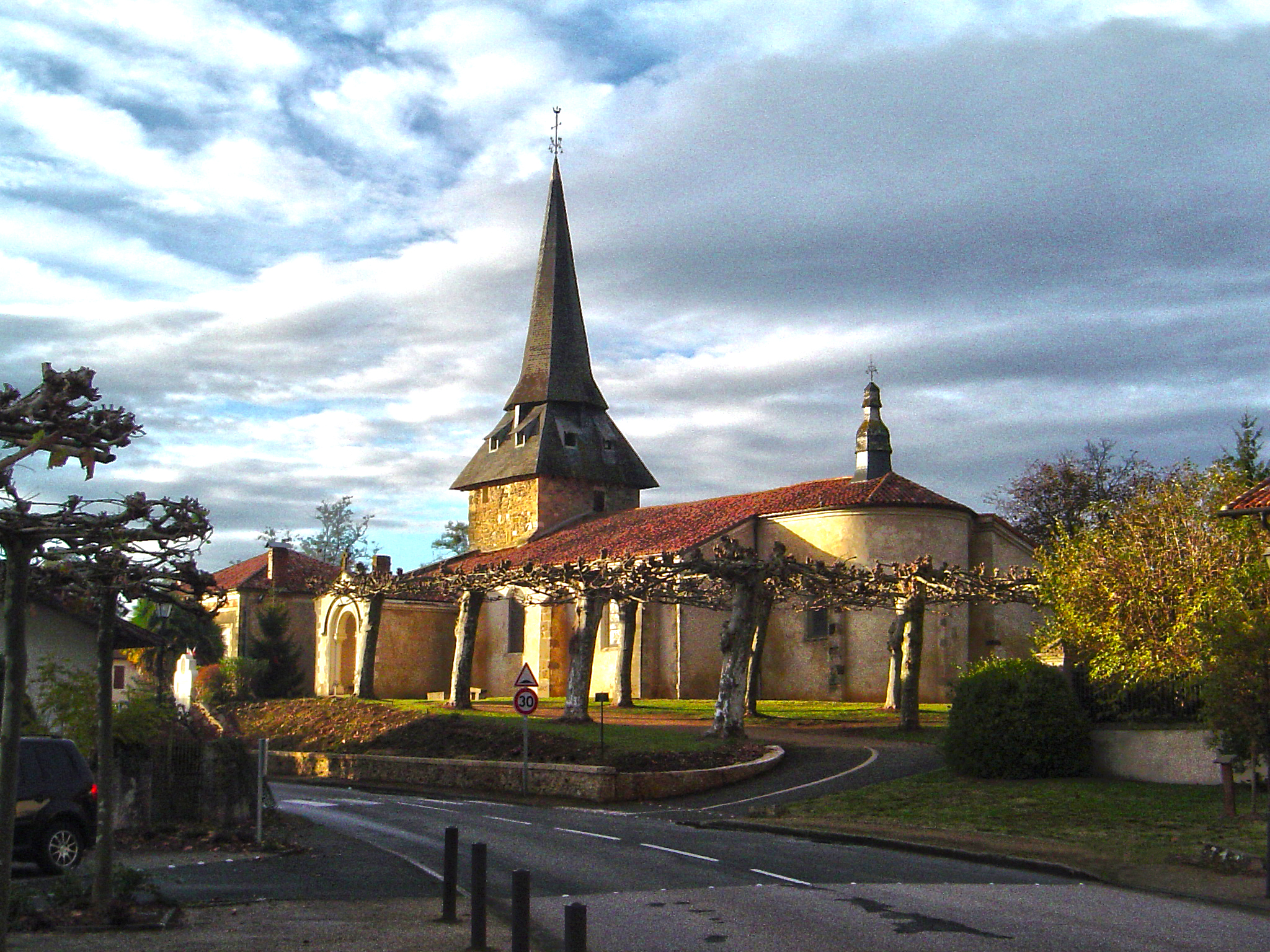
- The church in Laurède
- Location of Laurède
- Location within France Location within Nouvelle-Aquitaine
- Coordinates: 43°45′23″N 0°47′15″W
- Country: France
- Region: Nouvelle-Aquitaine
- Department: Landes
- Arrondissement: Dax
- Canton: Coteau de Chalosse
- Intercommunality: Terres de Chalosse

Government
  - Mayor (2020–2026): Michel Roussel
- Area^{1}: 5.7 km^{2} (2.2 sq mi)
- Elevation: 100 m (330 ft)
- Highest elevation: 99 m (325 ft)
- Lowest elevation: 13 m (43 ft)
- Population (2023): 367
  - Density: 64/km^{2} (170/sq mi)
- Time zone: UTC+01:00 (CET)
  - Summer (DST): UTC+02:00 (CEST)
- INSEE/Postal code: 40147 /40250
- ^{1} French Land Register data, which excludes lakes, ponds, glaciers > 1 km^{2} (0.386 sq mi or 247 acres) and river estuaries.

Laurède (French pronunciation: [loʁɛd]; Occitan: Laureda) is a commune in the Landes department in Nouvelle-Aquitaine in south-western France.

== Geography ==
Laurède covers an area of 5.7 square kilometre and is located in the Landes department of the Nouvelle Aquitaine region in southwestern France. It is the second largest province in mainland France, starting from Gironde department in the north, facing the Atlantic Ocean in the west, extending to Pyr é n é s department in the south, bordering Ger é s department in the east, and Lot et Garonne department in the northeast.

The municipalities (or old municipalities, urban areas) bordering Lorede include: Guts, Lurcon, Migron, and Poyane.

== See also ==
- Communes of the Landes department
