= Beyries =

- Commune
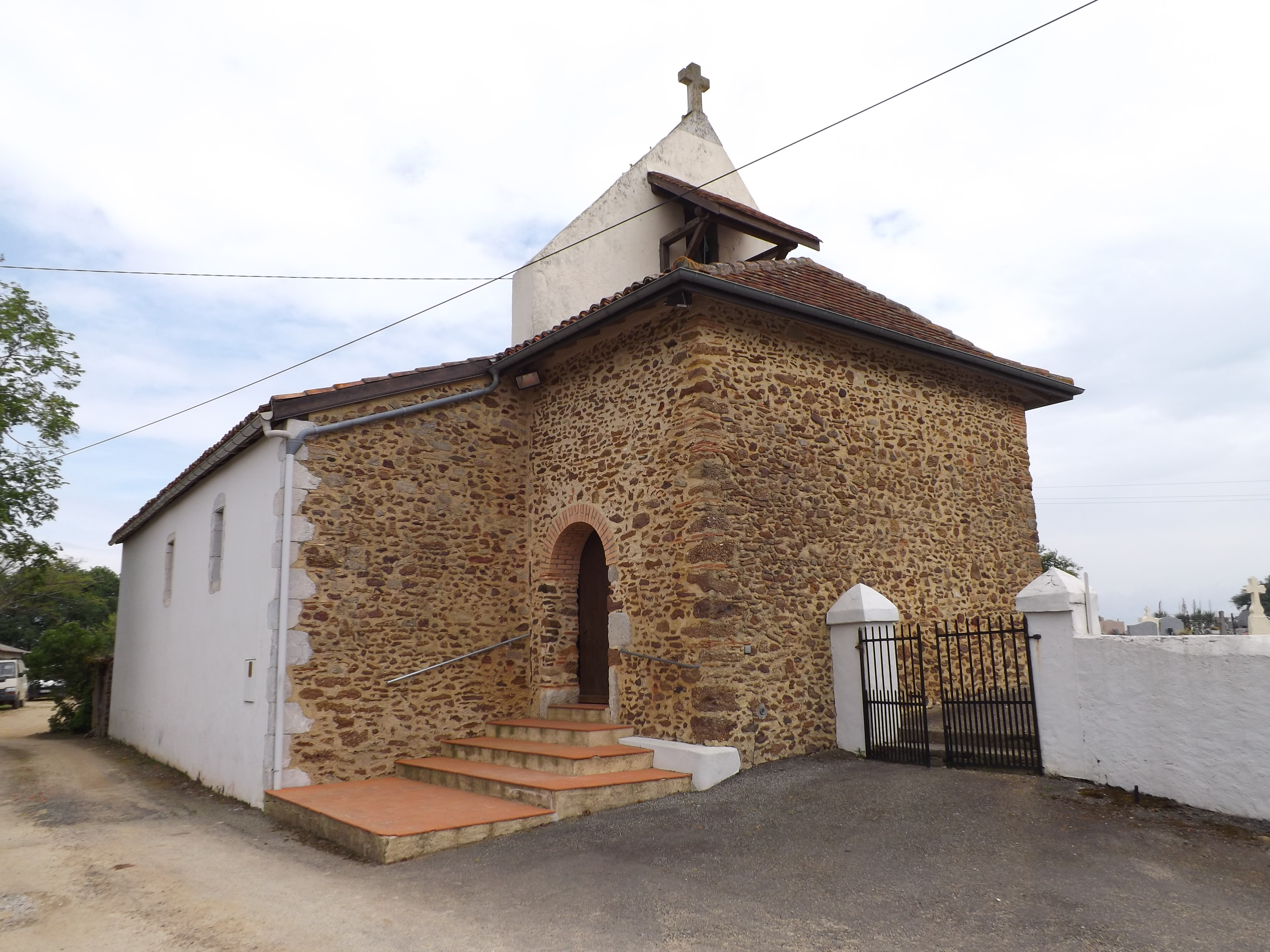
- The church of Beyries

- Coat of arms
- Location of Beyries
- Location within France Location within Nouvelle-Aquitaine
- Coordinates: 43°34′21″N 0°38′11″W
- Country: France
- Region: Nouvelle-Aquitaine
- Department: Landes
- Arrondissement: Dax
- Canton: Coteau de Chalosse

Government
  - Mayor (2020–2026): Martine Hillotte
- Area^{1}: 4.29 km^{2} (1.66 sq mi)
- Highest elevation: 163 m (535 ft)
- Lowest elevation: 77 m (253 ft)
- Population (2023): 121
  - Density: 28.2/km^{2} (73.1/sq mi)
- Time zone: UTC+01:00 (CET)
  - Summer (DST): UTC+02:00 (CEST)
- INSEE/Postal code: 40041 /40700
- ^{1} French Land Register data, which excludes lakes, ponds, glaciers > 1 km^{2} (0.386 sq mi or 247 acres) and river estuaries.

Beyries (French pronunciation: [beʁi]; Occitan: Veirias) is a commune in the Landes department in Nouvelle-Aquitaine in southwestern France.

== Transport ==
The nearest train station is Orthez station, on the TGV line from Paris to Tarbes. The nearest airport is Pau Pyrénées Airport.

== Population ==
Historical population
Year	Pop.	±% p.a.
1968	83	—
1975	82	−0.17%
1982	85	+0.51%
1990	94	+1.27%
1999	86	−0.98%
2007	94	+1.12%
2012	113	+3.75%
2017	128	+2.52%
2023	121	−0.93%
Source: INSEE

== See also ==
- Communes of the Landes department
