= Carcen-Ponson =

- Commune
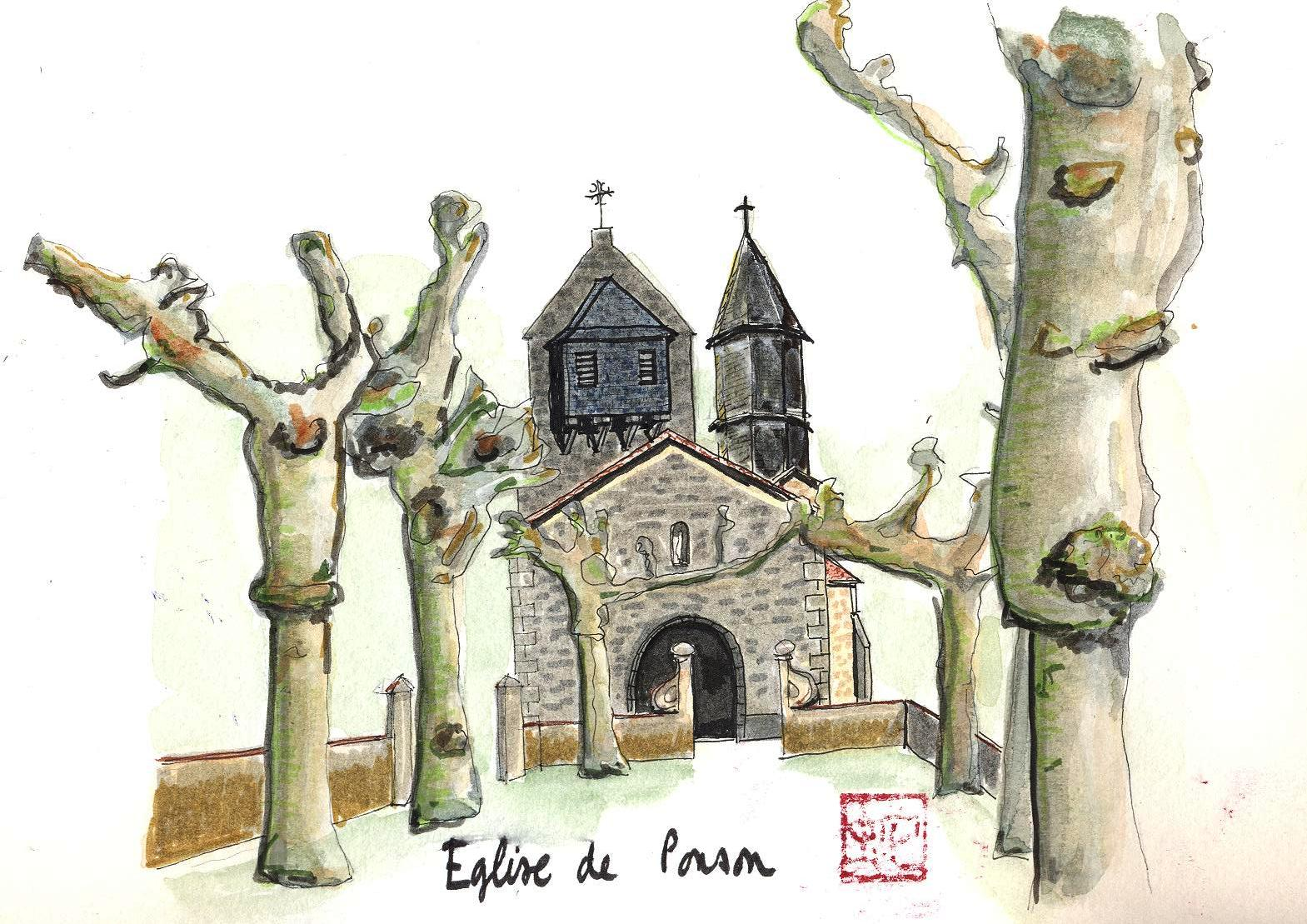
- Watercolor of the church
- Location of Carcen-Ponson
- Location within France Location within Nouvelle-Aquitaine
- Coordinates: 43°52′55″N 0°48′23″W
- Country: France
- Region: Nouvelle-Aquitaine
- Department: Landes
- Arrondissement: Dax
- Canton: Pays morcenais tarusate
- Intercommunality: Pays Tarusate

Government
  - Mayor (2020–2026): Sabine Dehez
- Area^{1}: 36.72 km^{2} (14.18 sq mi)
- Elevation: 44 m (144 ft)
- Highest elevation: 102 m (335 ft)
- Lowest elevation: 12 m (39 ft)
- Population (2023): 628
  - Density: 17.1/km^{2} (44.3/sq mi)
- Time zone: UTC+01:00 (CET)
  - Summer (DST): UTC+02:00 (CEST)
- INSEE/Postal code: 40067 /40400
- ^{1} French Land Register data, which excludes lakes, ponds, glaciers > 1 km^{2} (0.386 sq mi or 247 acres) and river estuaries.

Carcen-Ponson (French pronunciation: [kaʁsɛ̃ pɔ̃sɔ̃]; Occitan: Carcen e Ponson) is a commune in the Landes department in Nouvelle-Aquitaine in southwestern France.

== Population ==
Historical population
Year	Pop.	±% p.a.
1968	566	—
1975	538	−0.72%
1982	556	+0.47%
1990	600	+0.96%
1999	566	−0.65%
2007	591	+0.54%
2012	640	+1.61%
2017	634	−0.19%
2023	628	−0.16%
Source: INSEE

== See also ==
- Communes of the Landes department
