= Bégaar =

- Commune
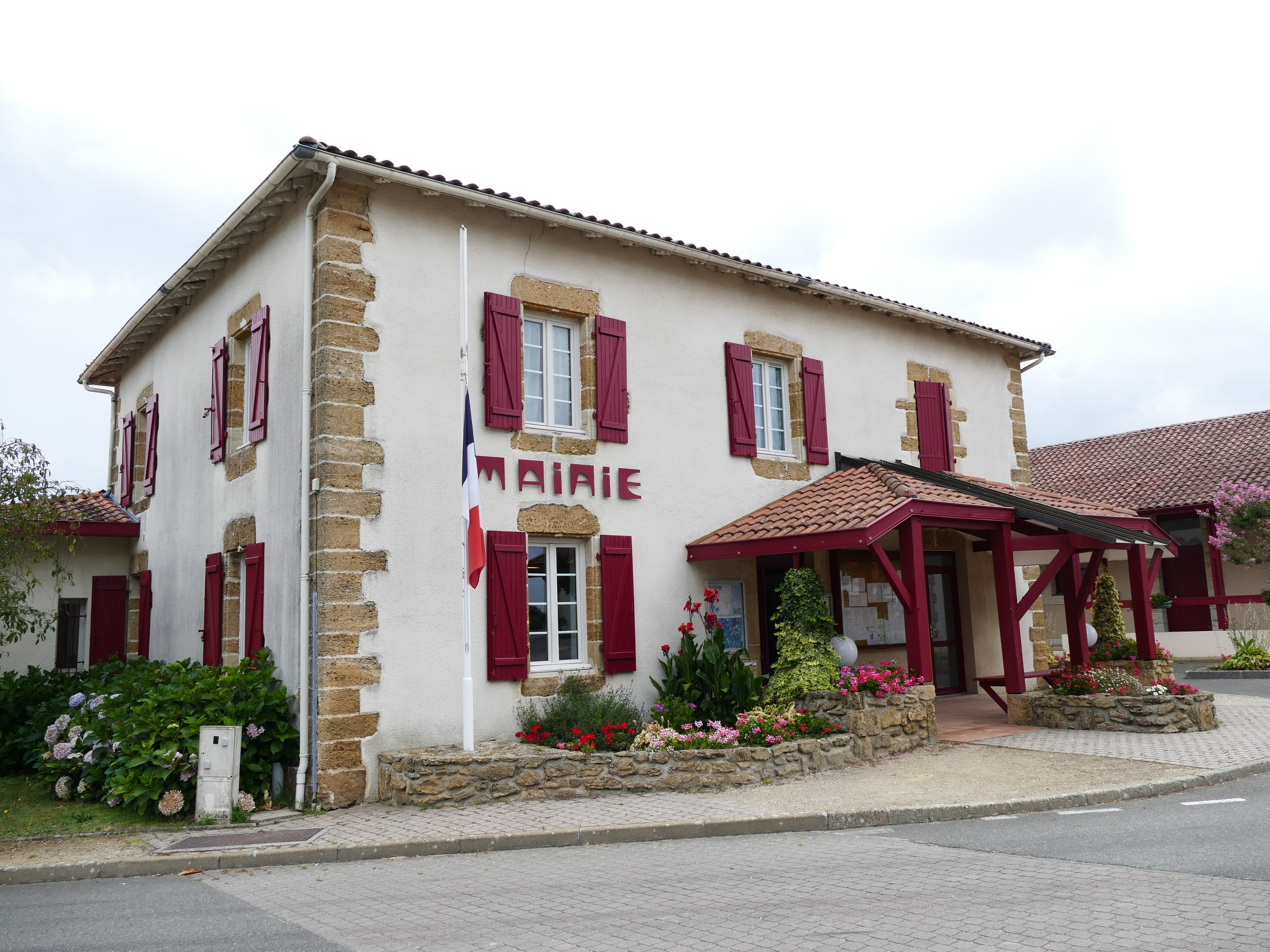
- Town hall
- Location of Bégaar
- Location within France Location within Nouvelle-Aquitaine
- Coordinates: 43°49′38″N 0°50′57″W
- Country: France
- Region: Nouvelle-Aquitaine
- Department: Landes
- Arrondissement: Dax
- Canton: Pays morcenais tarusate
- Intercommunality: Pays Tarusate

Government
  - Mayor (2020–2026): Jean-Pierre Poussard
- Area^{1}: 27.8 km^{2} (10.7 sq mi)
- Elevation: 19 m (62 ft)
- Highest elevation: 52 m (171 ft)
- Lowest elevation: 7 m (23 ft)
- Population (2023): 1,251
  - Density: 45.0/km^{2} (117/sq mi)
- Time zone: UTC+01:00 (CET)
  - Summer (DST): UTC+02:00 (CEST)
- INSEE/Postal code: 40031 /40400
- ^{1} French Land Register data, which excludes lakes, ponds, glaciers > 1 km^{2} (0.386 sq mi or 247 acres) and river estuaries.

Bégaar (French pronunciation: [beɡaʁ]; Occitan: Begar) is a commune in the Landes department in Nouvelle-Aquitaine in southwestern France.

Twin city in France: Surbourg in Alsace

== Population ==
Historical population
Year	Pop.	±% p.a.
1968	946	—
1975	843	−1.63%
1982	908	+1.07%
1990	1,000	+1.21%
1999	939	−0.70%
2007	1,033	+1.20%
2012	1,091	+1.10%
2017	1,167	+1.36%
2023	1,251	+1.17%
Source: INSEE
