= Benquet =

- Commune
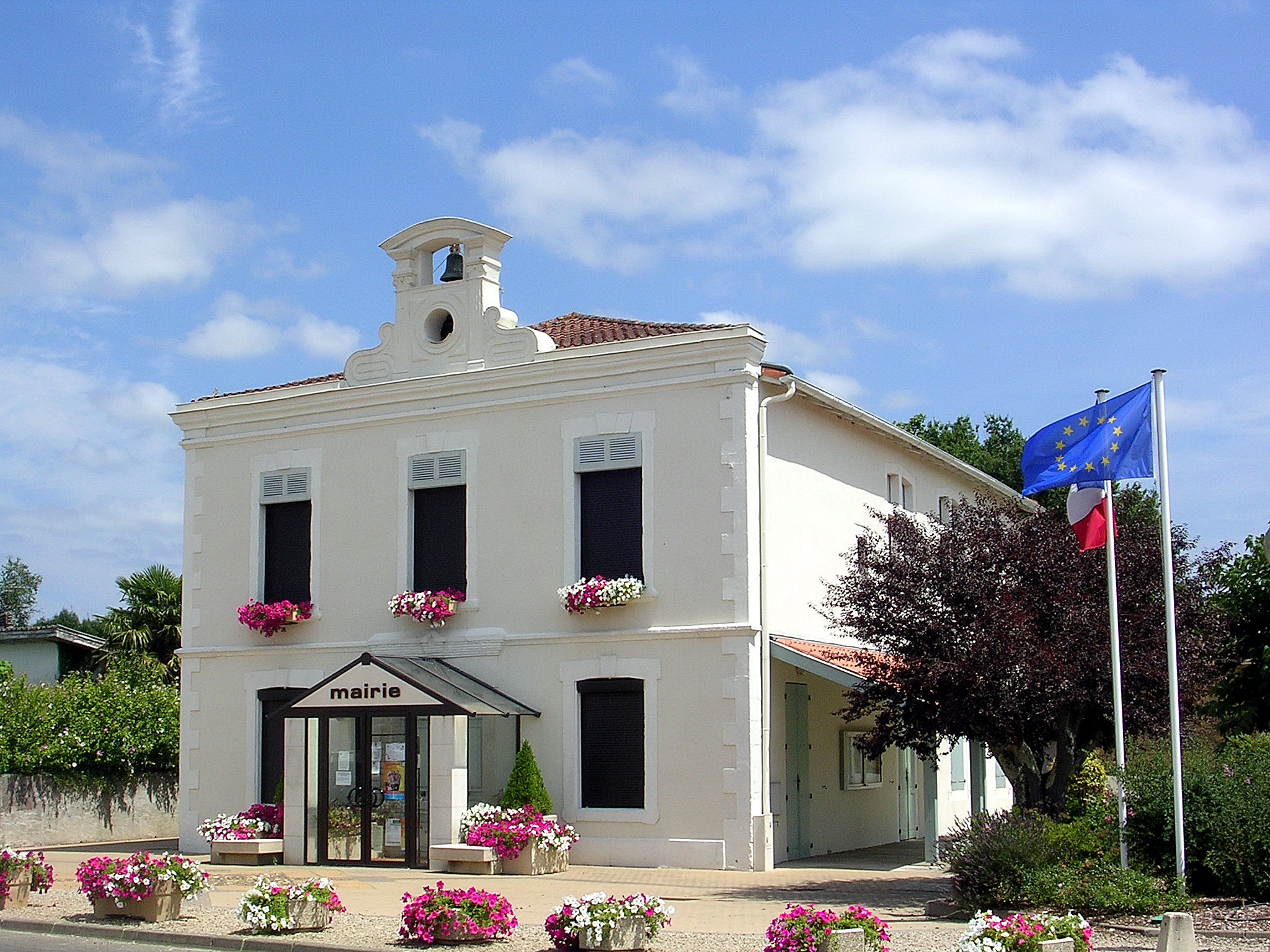
- Town hall
- Location of Benquet
- Location within France Location within Nouvelle-Aquitaine
- Coordinates: 43°49′51″N 0°30′02″W
- Country: France
- Region: Nouvelle-Aquitaine
- Department: Landes
- Arrondissement: Mont-de-Marsan
- Canton: Mont-de-Marsan-2
- Intercommunality: Mont-de-Marsan Agglomération

Government
  - Mayor (2020–2026): Pierre Mallet
- Area^{1}: 29.33 km^{2} (11.32 sq mi)
- Elevation: 60 m (200 ft)
- Highest elevation: 91 m (299 ft)
- Lowest elevation: 46 m (151 ft)
- Population (2023): 1,913
  - Density: 65.22/km^{2} (168.9/sq mi)
- Time zone: UTC+01:00 (CET)
  - Summer (DST): UTC+02:00 (CEST)
- INSEE/Postal code: 40037 /40280
- ^{1} French Land Register data, which excludes lakes, ponds, glaciers > 1 km^{2} (0.386 sq mi or 247 acres) and river estuaries.

Benquet (French pronunciation: [bɛ̃kɛ]) is a commune in the Landes department in Nouvelle-Aquitaine in southwestern France.

== Geography ==
Benquet is situated 5 miles (8 km) south of Mont-de-Marsan, at the confines of the Landes forest and of the agricultural region of Chalosse. It is 55 miles (89 km) from the Atlantic Ocean.

Neighboring cities are: Saint-Pierre-du-Mont, Bretagne-de-Marsan, Saint-Maurice-sur-Adour, Saint-Sever, Bas-Mauco, Haut-Mauco.

== History ==
Benquet, belonging to the former royal province of Gascony, was under the rule of the abbey of Saint Sever. Jehan Bernard de Benquet, vassal of the prince of Navarre, had the title of Sénéchal of Marsan and of Gabardan. Fights with French Huguenots are reported here.

== Population ==
Historical population
Year	Pop.	±% p.a.
1968	828	—
1975	1,039	+3.30%
1982	1,154	+1.51%
1990	1,240	+0.90%
1999	1,291	+0.45%
2007	1,427	+1.26%
2012	1,557	+1.76%
2017	1,732	+2.15%
2023	1,913	+1.67%
Source: INSEE

Its inhabitants are called Benquetois in French.

== Economy ==
Mostly corn-growing, breeding (ducks, geese), foie-gras making. Agri-foodstuff research center.

== Twin cities ==
Benquet is the twin village of Muespach-le-Haut, on the German border. As a matter of fact, population from Alsace flew their region and found shelter in South-Western France when the Nazi troops arrived in the early stages of World War II.

== Sights ==
Churches St John the Baptist (19th century) and Saint Christau (eleventh century). Benquet is a stopover on the medieval pilgrimage route to Santiago Compostela (route of Vézelay). Benquet boasts a the privately owned château de Laurens Castelet and a "miraculous" spring, close to the church of St Christau.

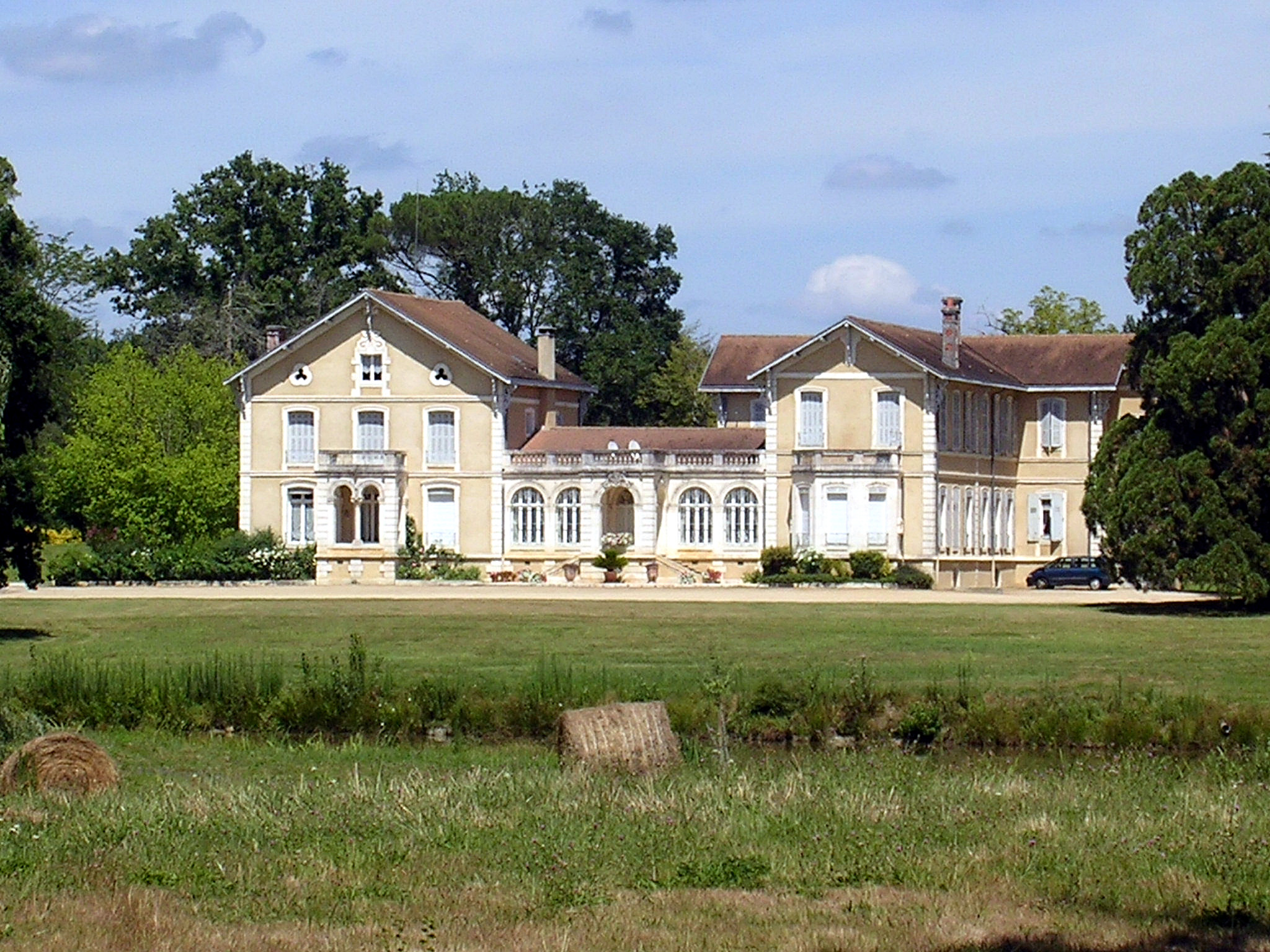
Château de Benquet

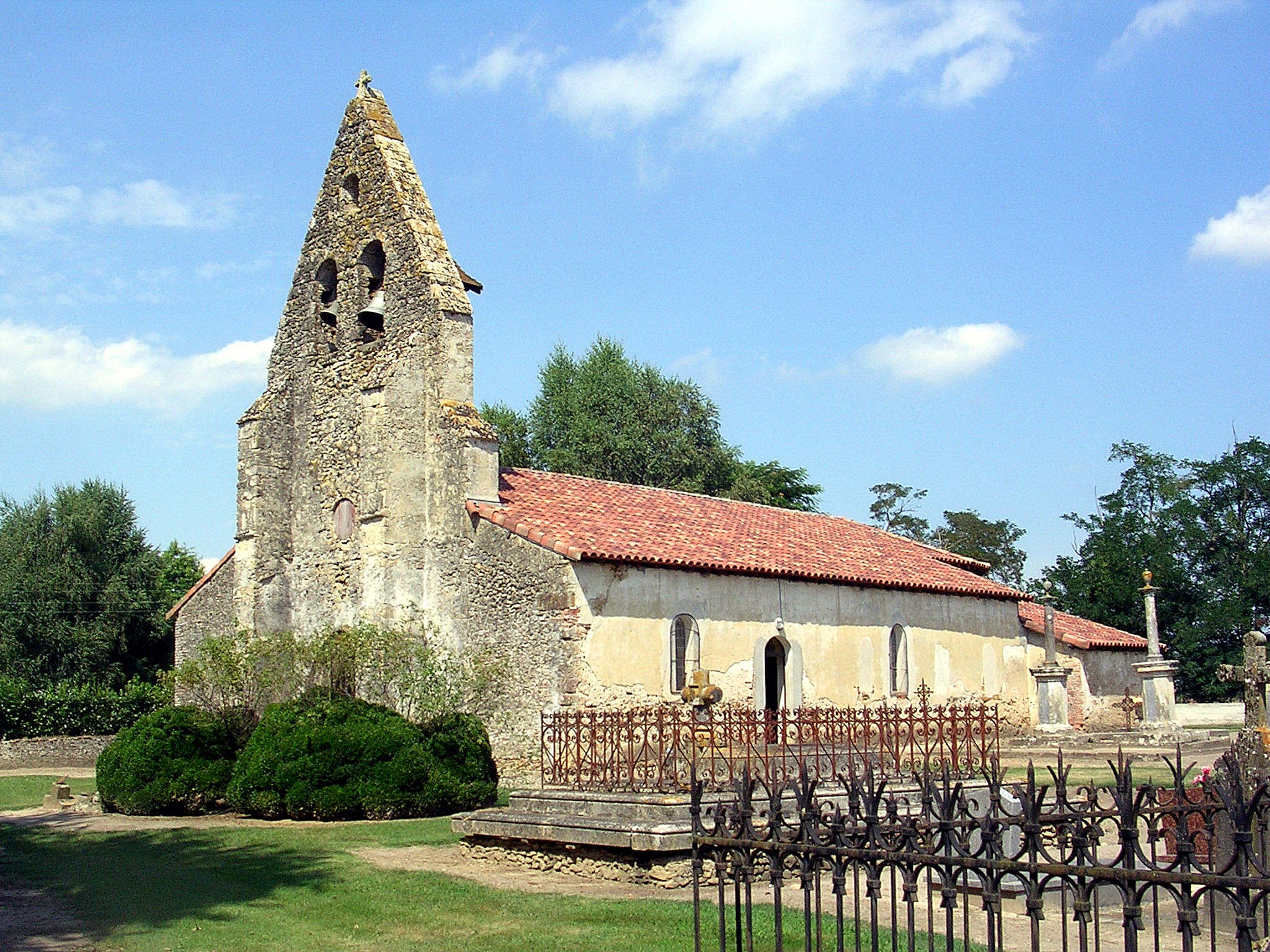
11th-century church

King Henri IV had an elegant home in Benquet: the Château-Vieux lodge (no longer exists).

== Religion and language ==
People are mostly Catholic. The official language is French. The Gascon language is still spoken by some elderly people on some occasions.

== Recreational activities ==
Hunting (woodcocks, pheasants...) and fishing are very popular + walking (pilgrims to Santiago are still to be met), cycling, basketball playing.

== Events ==
- Music Festival Atout Choeurs : early May
- Fair of Benquet : early July

== See also ==
- Communes of the Landes département
