= Louis-Anselme Longa =

French painter (1809–1869)

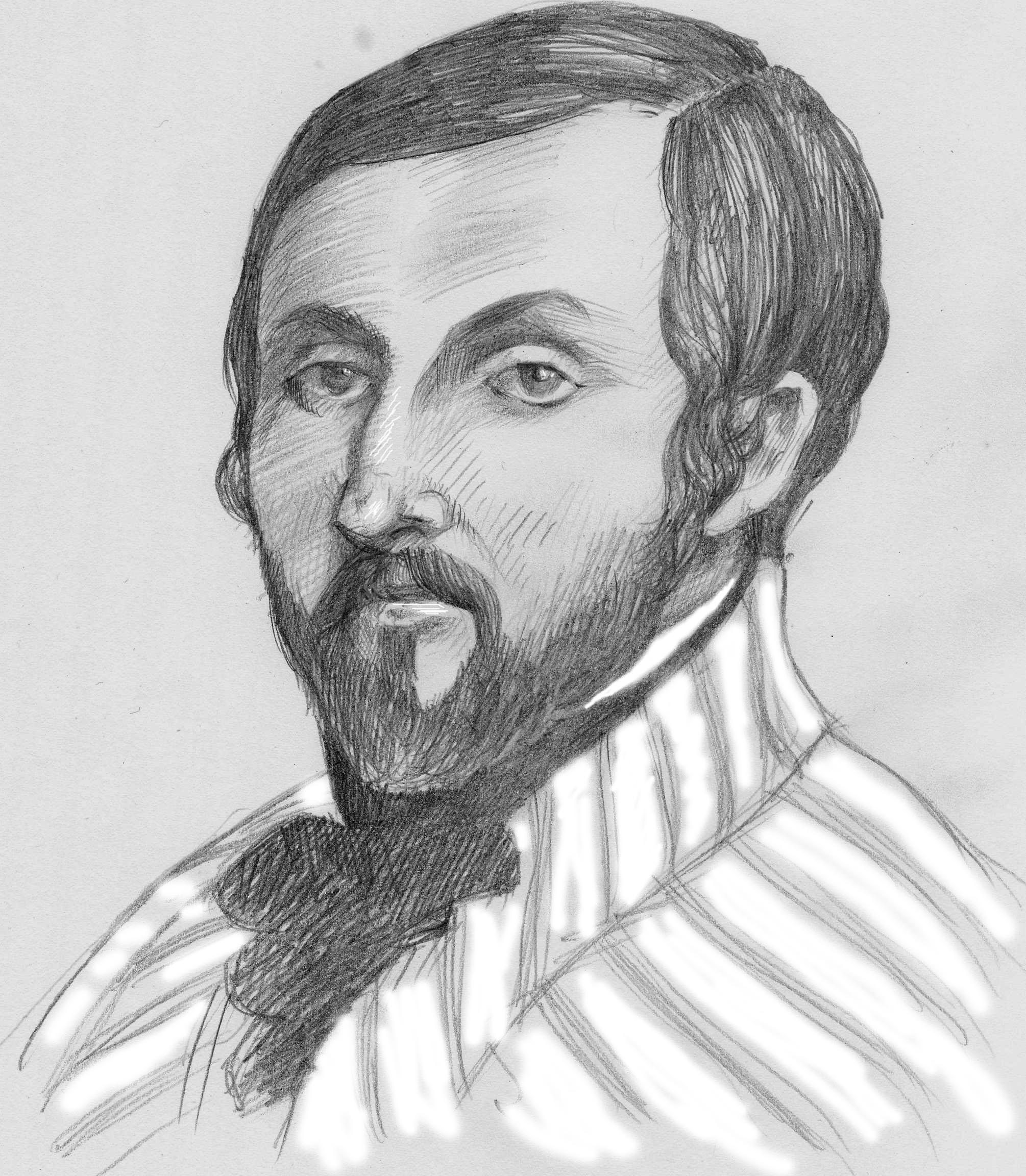
- Portrait of L.A. Longa, crayon and gouache
- Born: 4 April 1809; Mont-de-Marsan, France
- Died: 13 December 1869 (aged 60); Mont-de-Marsan, France
- Education: Paul Delaroche
- Known for: Painter
- Style: Genre art, Academic style
- Movement: Orientalist

Louis-Anselme Longa (4 April 1809 – 13 December 1869) was a French genre artist in the Academic style. He also created numerous church paintings, but is best known for his Orientalist works.

== Biography ==
He studied design in Paris with Paul Delaroche, and had his first exhibit at the Salon of 1835. Originally, he appears to have been attracted to the troubador style.

In 1841, he was hired by the "Commission d'exploration scientifique d'Algérie" and employed as a painter and draftsman's assistant to accompany an expedition. He went to Algiers first, but did most of his work in the region surrounding Constantine, which had recently been occupied by French troops. Eventually, 138 portraits and scenes were completed and delivered to Jean-de-Dieu Soult, Chairman of the Commission. They are currently in the possession of the Muséum National d'Histoire Naturelle. In regard to his portraits, Longa was accused by his superior, Colonel Bory de Saint-Vincent, of departing from their original scientific and didactic intent, but Longa's approach was defended by Soult.

From 1843 to 1847, some of the more notable paintings were presented at the Salon. His experiences and drawings were also turned into a "report", published by the new journal L'Illustration, with text by Alphonse Castaing (1822-1888).

He returned permanently to Mont-de-Marsan in 1848 and opened a studio. Much of his time was spent creating promotions and decorations for local events or visiting celebrities. In 1866, he was named a Professor of design at the newly opened "Lycée Impérial de Mont-de-Marsan" (later renamed in honor of Victor Duruy) and remained there until his death.

In addition to his work in Algeria, he painted numerous portraits and created decorations in several churches; most notably those in his hometown, Geloux, Tartas, Maillères and Uchacq-et-Parentis. Very often, however, attribution of specific details is difficult and some works may have been done in conjunction with his brother Louis-François, a goldsmith and amateur painter.

== Selected paintings ==
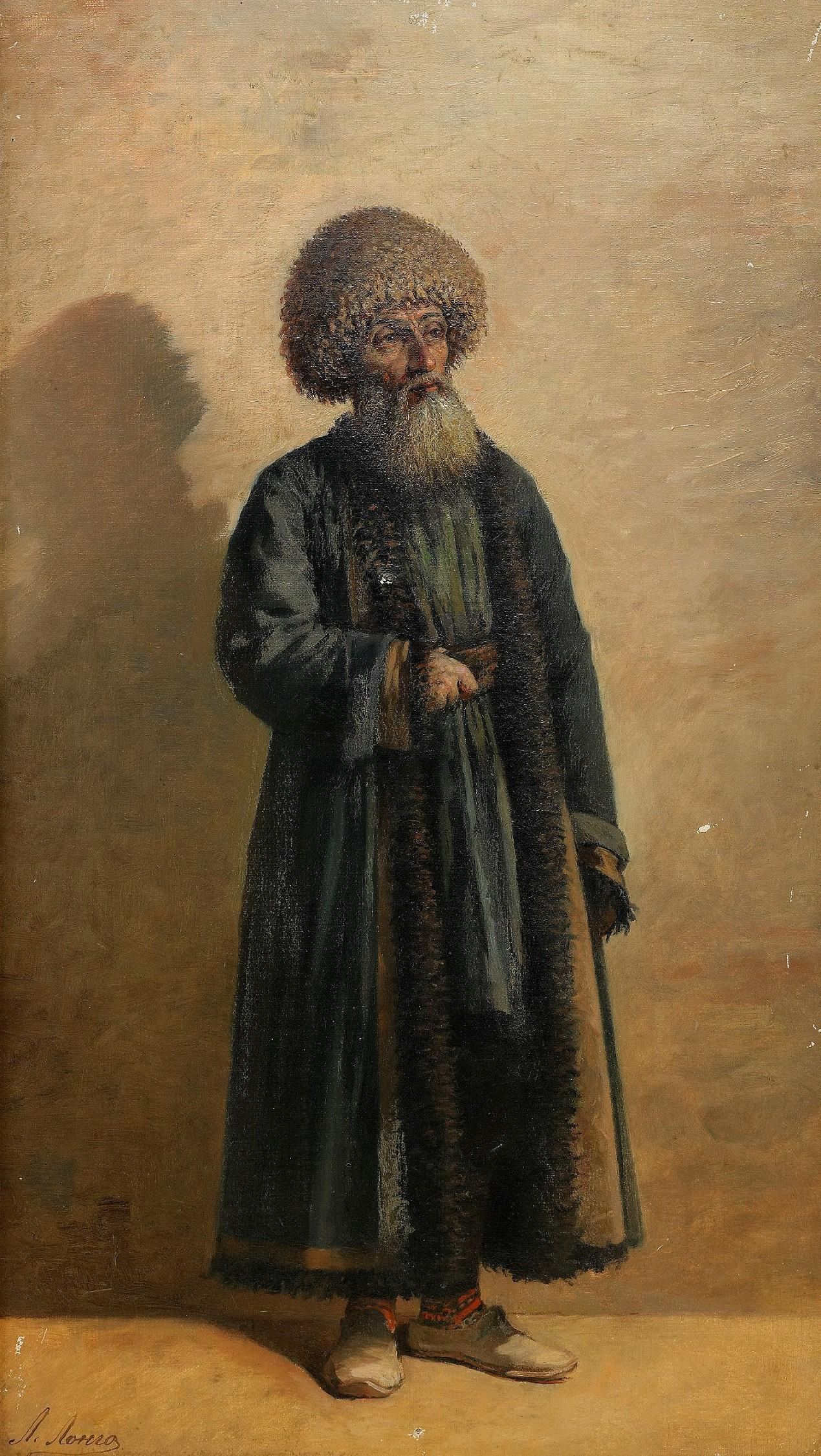
An Elder

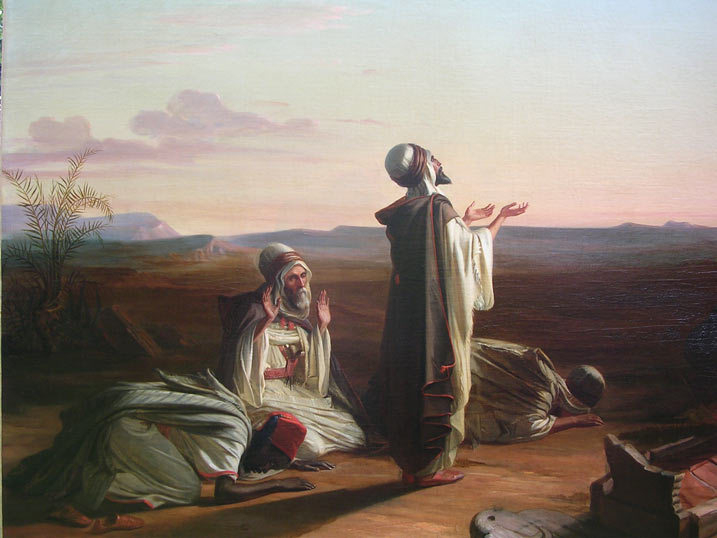
Prayer in the Orient

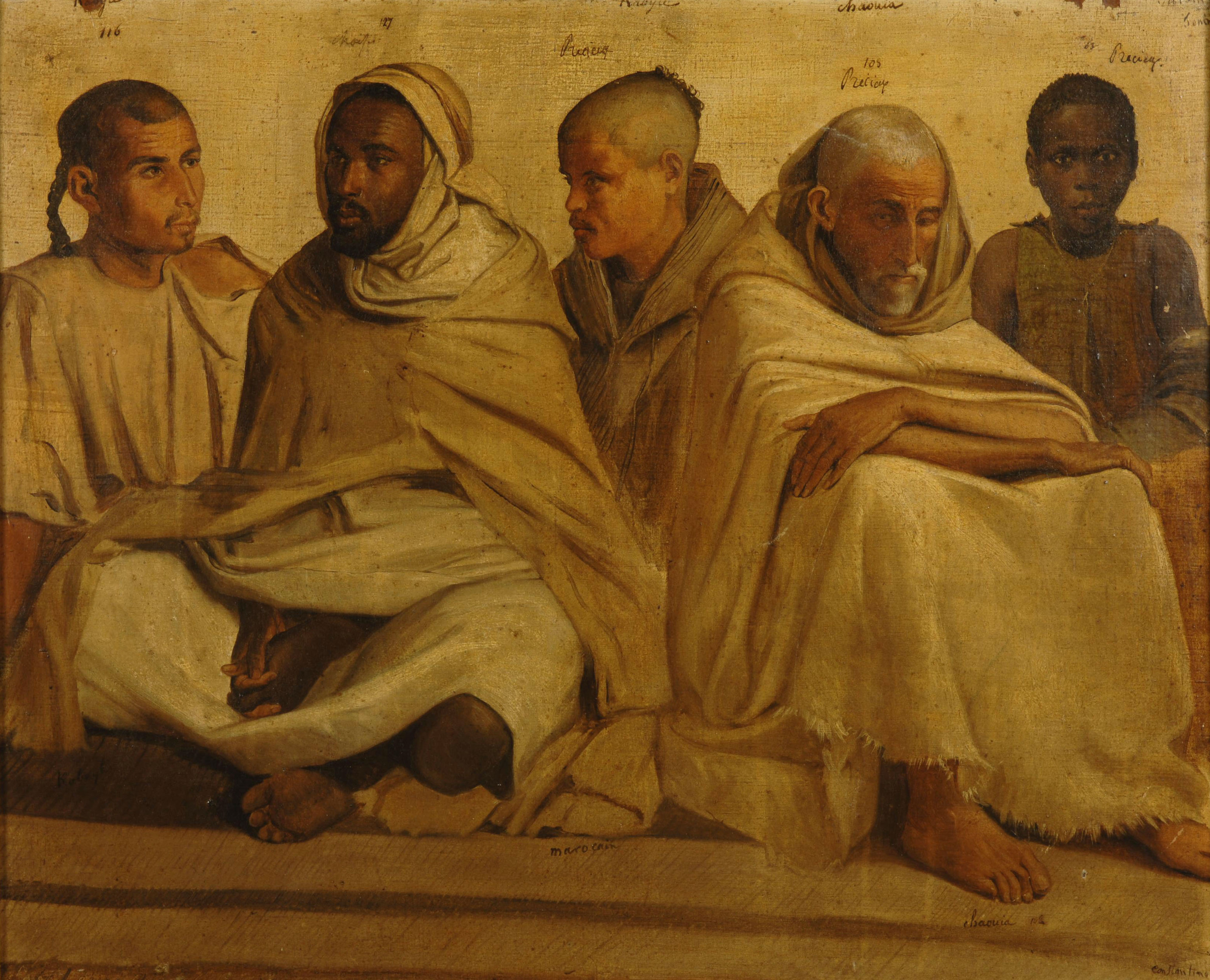
Algerian Portraits

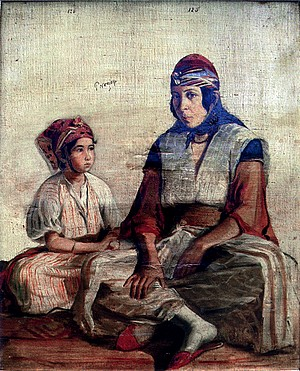
Ouerda and her Daughter

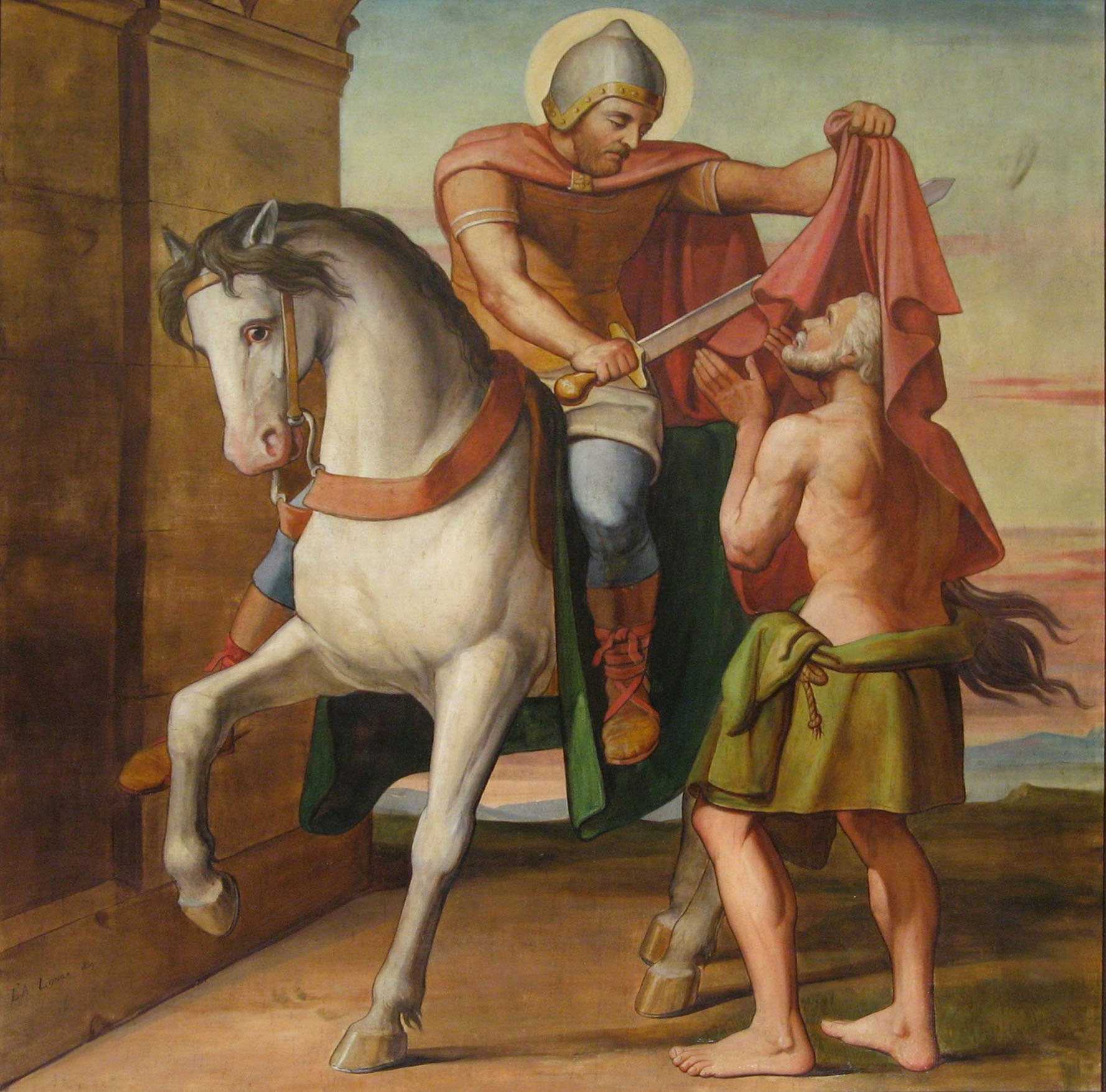
The Charity of Saint Martin

== See also ==
- List of Orientalist artists
- Orientalism
