= Jean-Marc Mazzonetto =

- Born: 7 October 1983 Agen, France
- Died: 9 January 2018 (aged 34) Gaillères, France
- Height: 1.80 m (5 ft 11 in)
- Weight: 90 kg (14 st 2 lb; 198 lb)

Rugby union career
- Position(s): Wing, Fullback
Amateur team(s)
Years	Team	Apps	(Points)
- Lectoure
–	SU Agen		
Senior career
Years	Team	Apps	(Points)
2005–18	Stade Montois	166	(190)
- Correct as of 4 December 2012

Jean-Marc Mazzonetto (Agen, 7 October 1983 – Gaillères, 9 January 2018) was a French rugby union player. His position was Wing or Fullback and he last played for Stade Montois (Mont-de-Marsan) in the Top 14.

Mazzonetto died in a road accident in Gaillères on 9 January 2018. He was 34.
