= Château de Saint-Maurice-sur-Adour =

Coordinates: 43°46′56″N 0°27′48″W

Château de Saint-Maurice
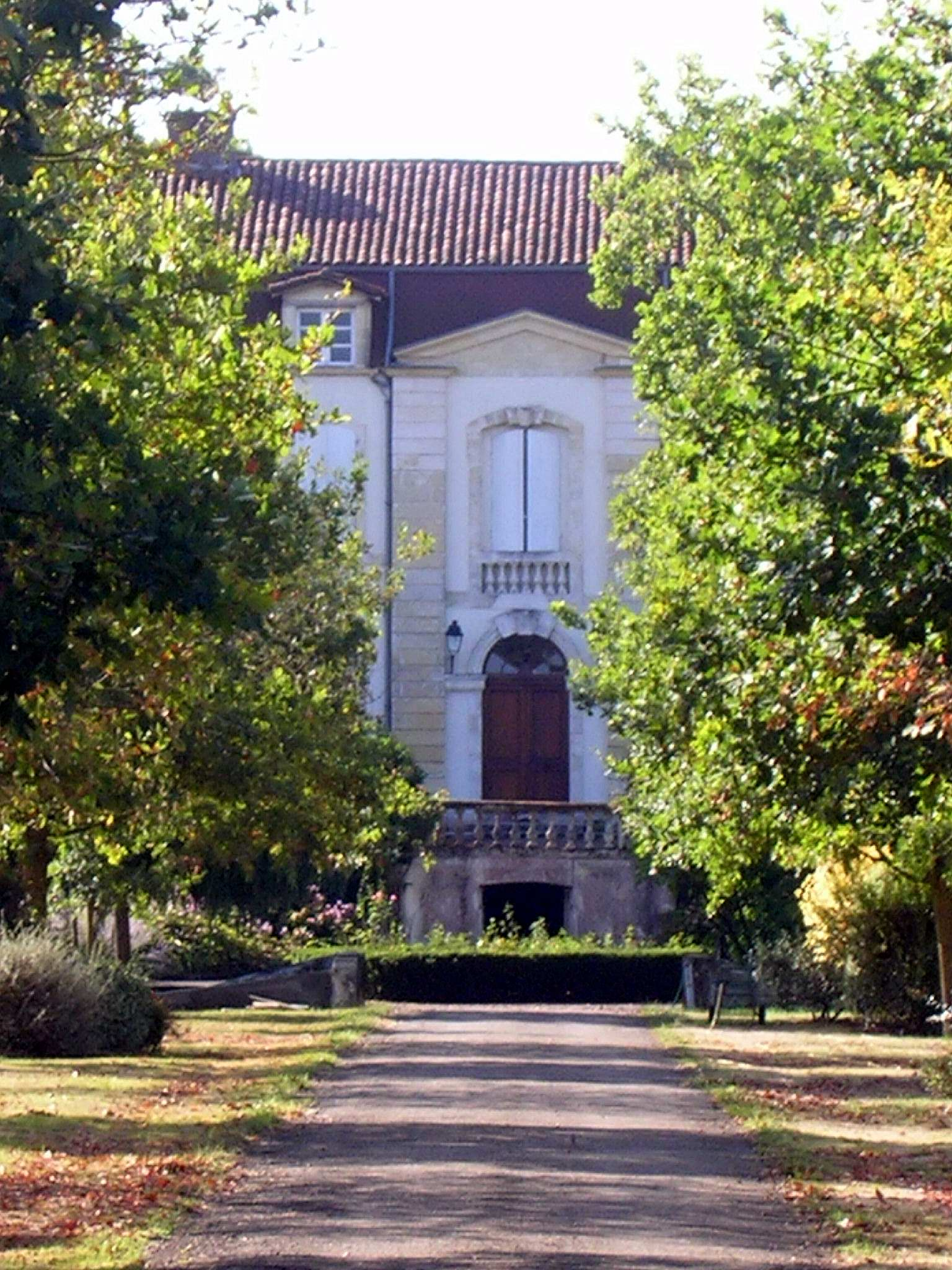
- Entrance

- Location within France

General information
- Type: Chateau
- Location: Saint-Maurice-sur-Adour, Landes, France
- Estimated completion: 19th century

Technical details
- Floor count: 2 plus attics

The Château de Saint-Maurice is a château in the village of Saint-Maurice-sur-Adour in the Landes department of Nouvelle-Aquitaine, France. The present building dates to the 19th century, on the site of an older structure.

== Location ==
The commune of Saint Maurice sur Adour is located south of Mont-de-Marsan. It originated as a bastide (fortified town) built in the 13th century by Edward II of England. The village is rustic, and contains a 16th-century church and the Château de Saint Maurice.

== History ==
A record has survived of the marriage at the former Château de Saint Maurice (Saint-Maurice-sur-Adour Landes) on 18 July 1718 between Pierre Maurice de Fortisson, knight and Viscount of Saint Maurice and Marthe Marie de Pontac, daughter of Mathieu de Pontac, Seigneur de Belhade and Baron de Sauviac.

== Building ==
The present Château de Saint-Maurice is one of three in the vicinity of the village of Saint-Maurice-sur-Adour, the others being the 18th century Château de Lobit and the Château de Myredé. It was built in the 19th century, and replaced the former residence of the Viscounts of Béarn. It is a rectangular 2-storey building, with attics with nine bay windows. The center bay projects slightly from the roof above a pediment.

== Sources ==
- "(Landes.) Famille De Fortisson de Saint Maurice. 2 Manuscrits", auction.fr (in French)
- "Le Chateau de Saint-Maurice-sur-Adour a Saint-Maurice-sur-Adour - 40270", Les Plus Beaux Chateaux dans les Landes (in French)
- "Saint Maurice sur Adour", Landes tourisme (in French)
- Truffet, Jean Claude, St_Maurice_Adour (in French)
