= Oney =

Oney may refer to:

- "Oney" (song), a 1972 song by Johnny Cash
- Oney, Oklahoma, an unincorporated community in Oklahoma
- Oney, a subsidiary of the French company Auchan

== People ==
- Chris O'Neill (YouTuber) (born 1990), or Oney, Irish YouTuber
- Oney Guillen, son of MLB manager Ozzie Guillén
- Oney Judge (c. 1773–1848), or Ona Judge, an enslaved woman, owned by George Washington's family, who liberated herself
- Oney Lorcan (born 1985), American professional wrestler
- Oney Tapia (born 1976), Italian-Cuban Paralympic athlete
- Dawn Oney, Miss Montana USA 1954

== See also ==
- Saint-Martin-d'Oney
