= Raphitoma pulchra =

Scientific classification
- Kingdom: Animalia
- Phylum: Mollusca
- Class: Gastropoda
- Subclass: Caenogastropoda
- Order: Neogastropoda
- Superfamily: Conoidea
- Family: Raphitomidae
- Genus: Raphitoma
- Species: R. pulchra

Binomial name
- Raphitoma pulchra (M.A. Peyrot, 1931 )

Synonyms
- † Daphnella pulchra Peyrot, 1931 superseded combination

Extinct species of gastropod

Raphitoma pulchra is an extinct species of sea snail, a marine gastropod mollusc, in the family Raphitomidae.

== Description ==
The length of the shell attains 13 mm.

== Distribution ==
Fossils of this extinct marine species were found in Miocene strata in Saint-Martin-d'Oney, Aquitaine, France.
