= Canton of Mont-de-Marsan-1 =

Coordinates: 43.89°N 0.50°W

The canton of Mont-de-Marsan-1 is an administrative division of the Landes department, southwestern France. It was created at the French canton reorganisation which came into effect in March 2015. Its seat is in Mont-de-Marsan.

It consists of the following communes:

- Bostens
- Campet-et-Lamolère
- Gaillères
- Geloux
- Lucbardez-et-Bargues
- Mont-de-Marsan (partly)
- Pouydesseaux
- Saint-Avit
- Saint-Martin-d'Oney
- Uchacq-et-Parentis
