= Campagne, Landes =

Campagne
- Commune
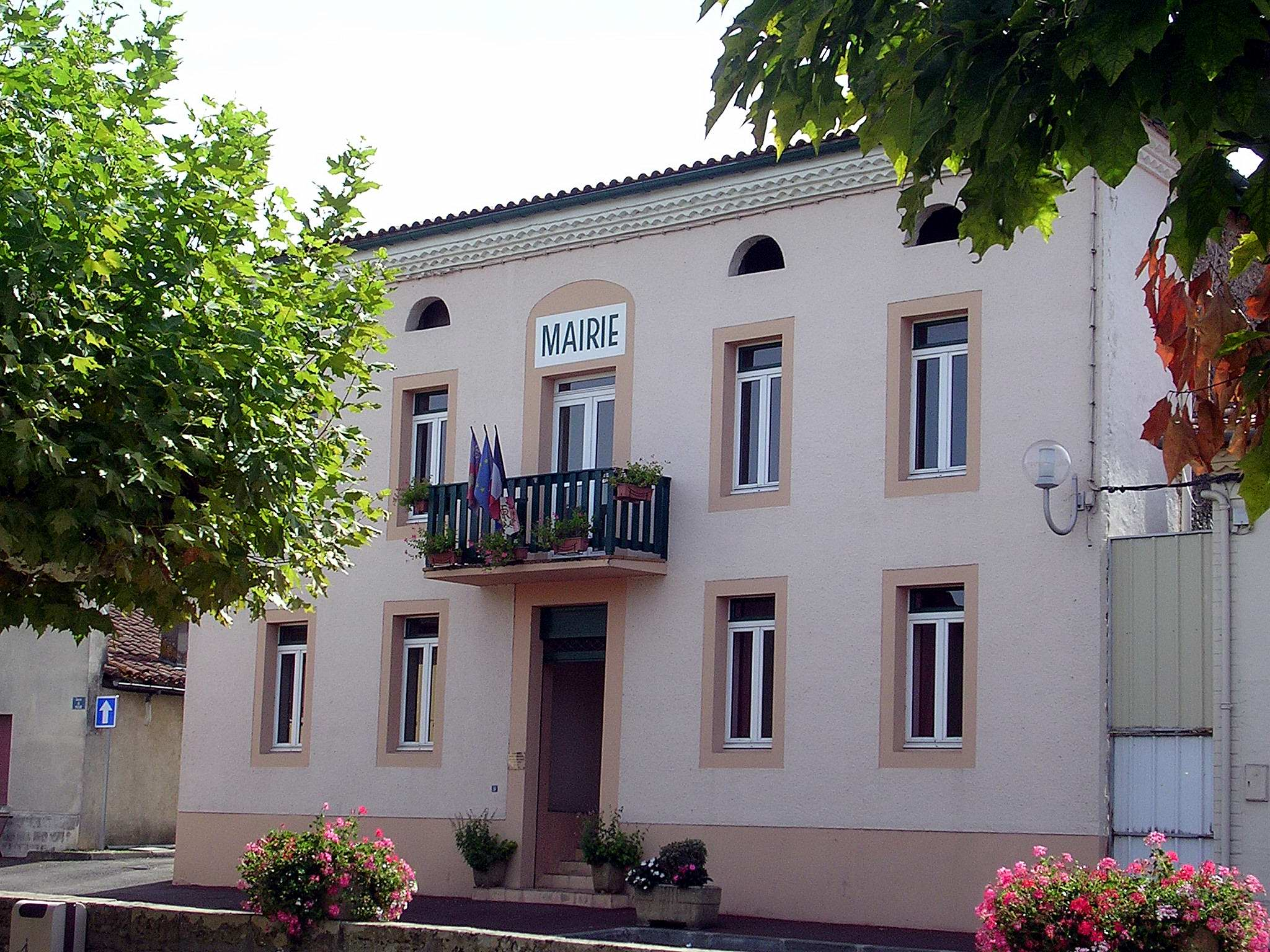
- Town hall

- Coat of arms
- Location of Campagne
- Location within France Location within Nouvelle-Aquitaine
- Coordinates: 43°51′57″N 0°38′19″W
- Country: France
- Region: Nouvelle-Aquitaine
- Department: Landes
- Arrondissement: Mont-de-Marsan
- Canton: Mont-de-Marsan-2
- Intercommunality: Mont-de-Marsan Agglomération

Government
  - Mayor (2020–2026): Frédéric Carrère
- Area^{1}: 33.91 km^{2} (13.09 sq mi)
- Elevation: 59 m (194 ft)
- Highest elevation: 92 m (302 ft)
- Lowest elevation: 20 m (66 ft)
- Population (2023): 1,061
  - Density: 31.29/km^{2} (81.04/sq mi)
- Time zone: UTC+01:00 (CET)
  - Summer (DST): UTC+02:00 (CEST)
- INSEE/Postal code: 40061 /40090
- ^{1} French Land Register data, which excludes lakes, ponds, glaciers > 1 km^{2} (0.386 sq mi or 247 acres) and river estuaries.

Campagne (French pronunciation: [kɑ̃paɲ]; Occitan: Campanha) is a commune in the Landes department in Nouvelle-Aquitaine in southwestern France.

== Population ==
Historical population
Year	Pop.	±% p.a.
1968	771	—
1975	682	−1.74%
1982	708	+0.54%
1990	765	+0.97%
1999	840	+1.04%
2007	910	+1.01%
2012	983	+1.56%
2017	998	+0.30%
2023	1,061	+1.03%
Source: INSEE

== See also ==
- Communes of the Landes department
