= Saint-Perdon =

- Commune
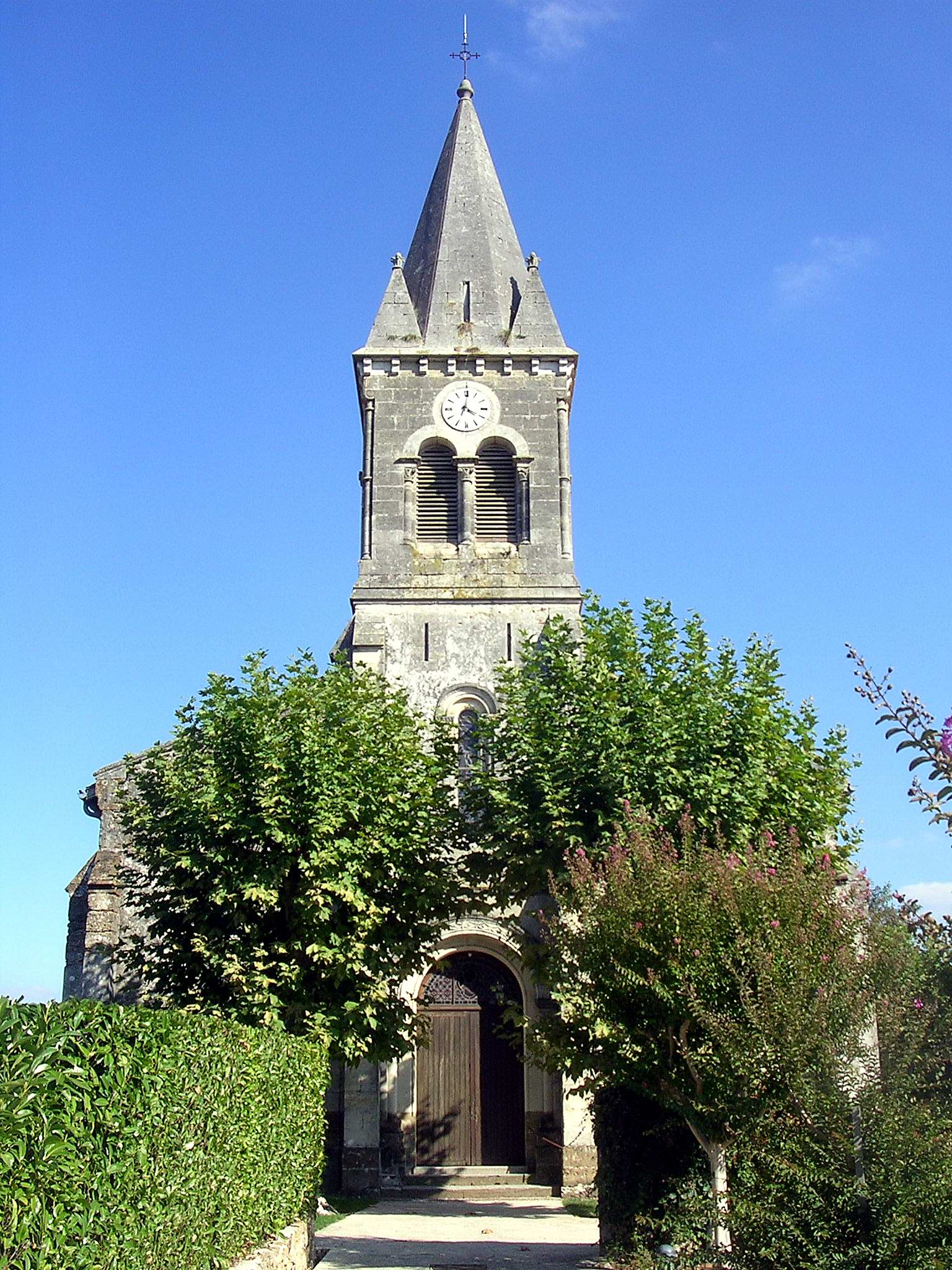
- Location of Saint-Perdon
- Location within France Location within Nouvelle-Aquitaine
- Coordinates: 43°52′10″N 0°35′27″W
- Country: France
- Region: Nouvelle-Aquitaine
- Department: Landes
- Arrondissement: Mont-de-Marsan
- Canton: Mont-de-Marsan-2
- Intercommunality: Mont-de-Marsan Agglomération

Government
  - Mayor (2020–2026): Jean-Louis Darrieutort
- Area^{1}: 30.62 km^{2} (11.82 sq mi)
- Elevation: 83 m (272 ft)
- Highest elevation: 94 m (308 ft)
- Lowest elevation: 20 m (66 ft)
- Population (2023): 1,732
  - Density: 56.56/km^{2} (146.5/sq mi)
- Time zone: UTC+01:00 (CET)
  - Summer (DST): UTC+02:00 (CEST)
- INSEE/Postal code: 40280 /40090
- ^{1} French Land Register data, which excludes lakes, ponds, glaciers > 1 km^{2} (0.386 sq mi or 247 acres) and river estuaries.

Saint-Perdon (French pronunciation: [sɛ̃ pɛʁdɔ̃]; Occitan: Sent Perdon) is a commune in the Landes department in Nouvelle-Aquitaine in southwestern France.

== Population ==
Historical population
Year	Pop.	±% p.a.
1968	640	—
1975	610	−0.68%
1982	748	+2.96%
1990	938	+2.87%
1999	984	+0.53%
2007	1,293	+3.47%
2012	1,609	+4.47%
2017	1,726	+1.41%
2023	1,732	+0.06%
Source: INSEE

== See also ==
- Communes of the Landes department
