= Mont-de-Marsan Agglomération =

- Communauté d'agglomération
- Interactive map of Mont-de-Marsan Agglomération
- Coordinates: 43°54′N 00°29′W
- Country: France
- Region: Nouvelle-Aquitaine
- Department: Landes
- No. of communes: {{{nbcomm}}}
- Established: 1998
- Area: 481.1 km^{2} (185.8 sq mi)
- Population (2019): 53,875
  - Density: 112.0/km^{2} (290.0/sq mi)
- Website: www.montdemarsan-agglo.fr

Mont-de-Marsan Agglomération is the communauté d'agglomération, an intercommunal structure, centred on the town of Mont-de-Marsan. It is located in the Landes department, in the Nouvelle-Aquitaine region, southwestern France. Created in 1998, its seat is in Mont-de-Marsan. Its area is 481.1 km^{2}. Its population was 53,875 in 2019, with a population density of 112/km sq, of which 29,807 were in Mont-de-Marsan proper.

== Composition ==
The communauté d'agglomération consists of the following 18 communes:

1. Benquet
2. Bostens
3. Bougue
4. Bretagne-de-Marsan
5. Campagne
6. Campet-et-Lamolère
7. Gaillères
8. Geloux
9. Laglorieuse
10. Lucbardez-et-Bargues
11. Mazerolles
12. Mont-de-Marsan
13. Pouydesseaux
14. Saint-Avit
15. Saint-Martin-d'Oney
16. Saint-Perdon
17. Saint-Pierre-du-Mont
18. Uchacq-et-Parentis
