= Château de Lobit =

Château in Nouvelle-Aquitaine, France

Coordinates: 43°47′33″N 0°27′43″W

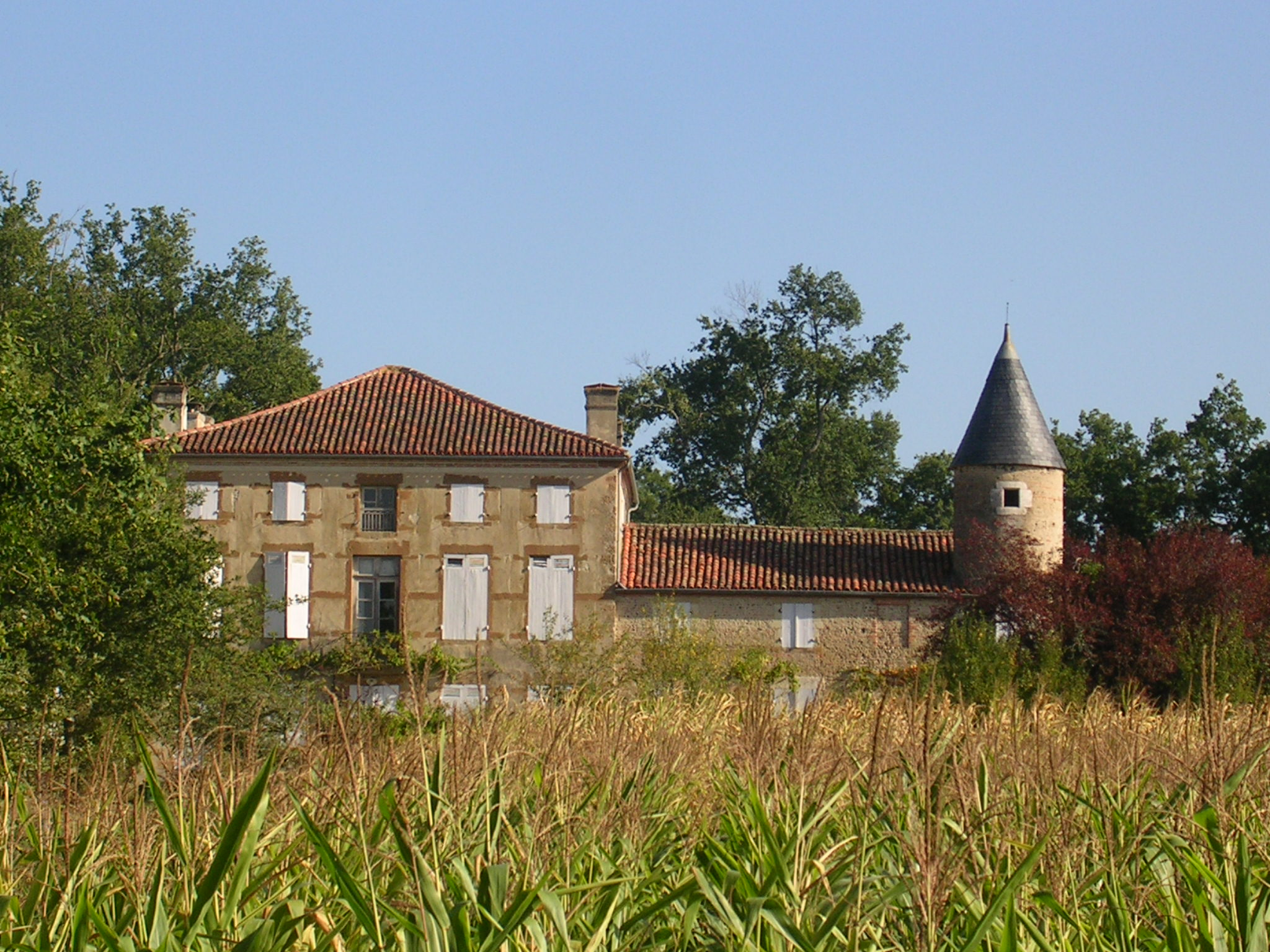
Château de Lobit

Château de Lobit is a château in the town of Saint-Maurice-sur-Adour, Landes department in the Nouvelle-Aquitaine region of France. It was built in the 18th century and is flanked by two towers.
