= Lucbardez-et-Bargues =

- Commune
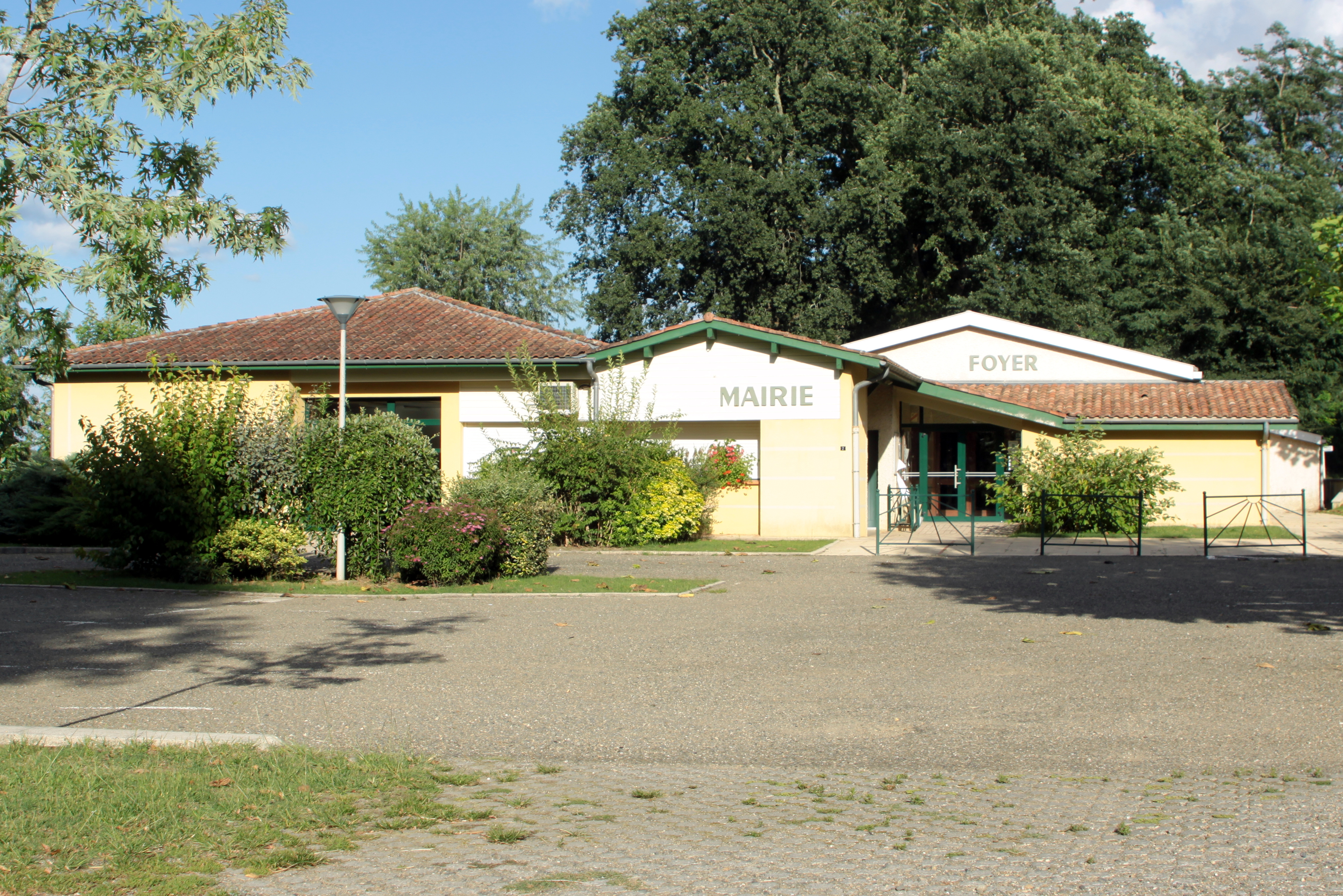
- The town hall in Lucbardez-et-Bargues
- Location of Lucbardez-et-Bargues
- Location within France Location within Nouvelle-Aquitaine
- Coordinates: 43°58′20″N 0°24′14″W
- Country: France
- Region: Nouvelle-Aquitaine
- Department: Landes
- Arrondissement: Mont-de-Marsan
- Canton: Mont-de-Marsan-1
- Intercommunality: Mont-de-Marsan Agglomération

Government
  - Mayor (2020–2026): Claude Coumat
- Area^{1}: 21.48 km^{2} (8.29 sq mi)
- Elevation: 80 m (260 ft)
- Highest elevation: 97 m (318 ft)
- Lowest elevation: 38 m (125 ft)
- Population (2023): 561
  - Density: 26.1/km^{2} (67.6/sq mi)
- Time zone: UTC+01:00 (CET)
  - Summer (DST): UTC+02:00 (CEST)
- INSEE/Postal code: 40162 /40090
- ^{1} French Land Register data, which excludes lakes, ponds, glaciers > 1 km^{2} (0.386 sq mi or 247 acres) and river estuaries.

Lucbardez-et-Bargues (French pronunciation: [lykbaʁdɛz e baʁɡ]; Occitan: Lucbardés e Bargas) is a commune in the Landes department in Nouvelle-Aquitaine in south-western France.

== See also ==
- Communes of the Landes department
