= Bostens =

- Commune
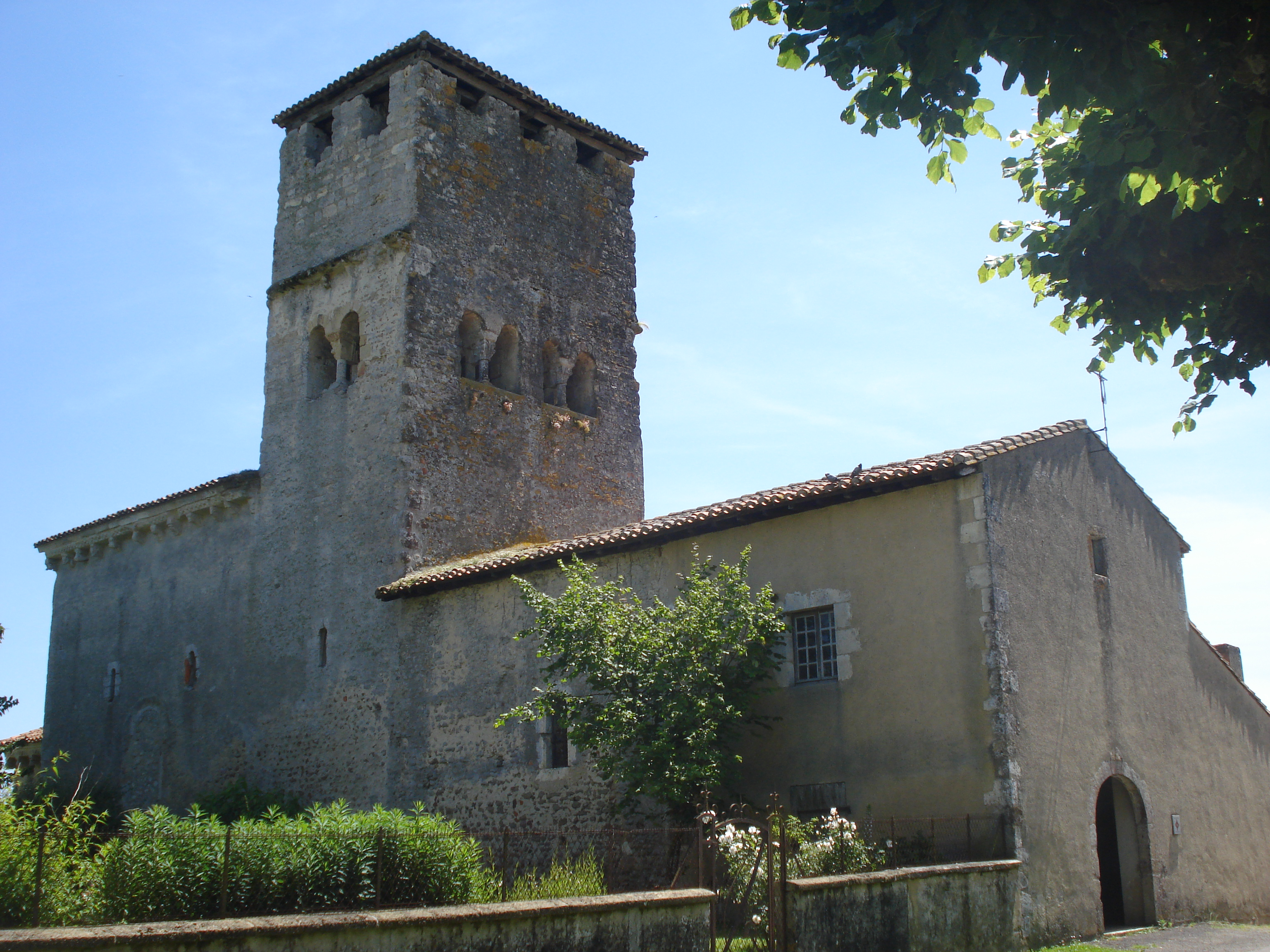
- Location of Bostens
- Location within France Location within Nouvelle-Aquitaine
- Coordinates: 43°58′19″N 0°21′34″W
- Country: France
- Region: Nouvelle-Aquitaine
- Department: Landes
- Arrondissement: Mont-de-Marsan
- Canton: Mont-de-Marsan-1
- Intercommunality: Mont-de-Marsan Agglomération

Government
  - Mayor (2020–2026): Nathalie Boiardi
- Area^{1}: 7.66 km^{2} (2.96 sq mi)
- Highest elevation: 119 m (390 ft)
- Lowest elevation: 80 m (260 ft)
- Population (2023): 206
  - Density: 26.9/km^{2} (69.7/sq mi)
- Time zone: UTC+01:00 (CET)
  - Summer (DST): UTC+02:00 (CEST)
- INSEE/Postal code: 40050 /40090
- ^{1} French Land Register data, which excludes lakes, ponds, glaciers > 1 km^{2} (0.386 sq mi or 247 acres) and river estuaries.

Bostens is a commune in the Landes department in Nouvelle-Aquitaine in southwestern France.

== Population ==
Historical population
Year	Pop.	±% p.a.
1968	131	—
1975	118	−1.48%
1982	100	−2.34%
1990	149	+5.11%
1999	149	+0.00%
2007	170	+1.66%
2012	177	+0.81%
2017	201	+2.58%
2023	206	+0.41%
Source: INSEE

== See also ==
- Communes of the Landes department
