= Saint-Avit, Landes =

Saint-Avit
- Commune
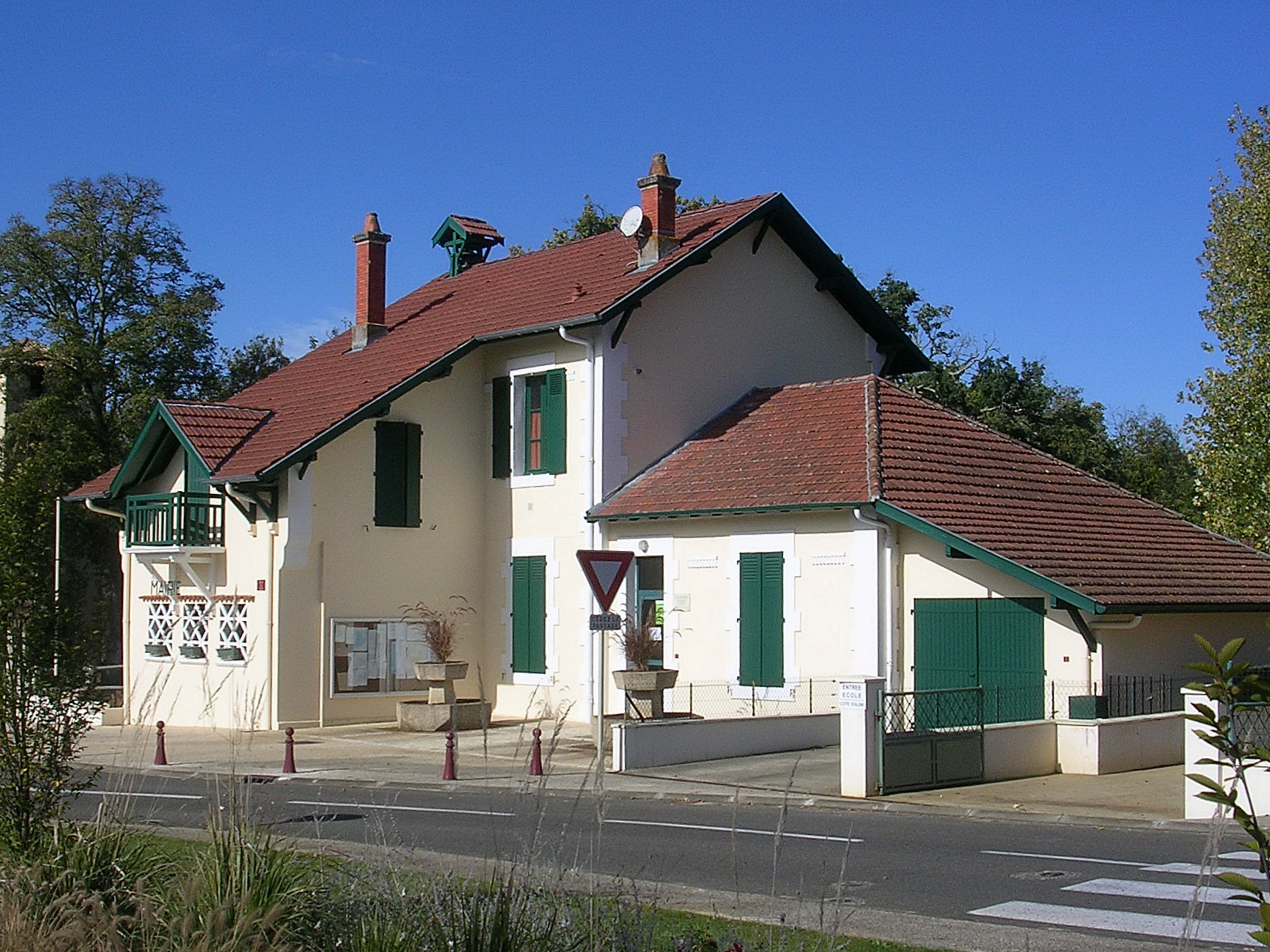
- Town hall
- Location of Saint-Avit
- Location within France Location within Nouvelle-Aquitaine
- Coordinates: 43°56′32″N 0°26′39″W
- Country: France
- Region: Nouvelle-Aquitaine
- Department: Landes
- Arrondissement: Mont-de-Marsan
- Canton: Mont-de-Marsan-1
- Intercommunality: Mont-de-Marsan Agglomération

Government
  - Mayor (2020–2026): Michel Garcia
- Area^{1}: 40.74 km^{2} (15.73 sq mi)
- Elevation: 96 m (315 ft)
- Highest elevation: 97 m (318 ft)
- Lowest elevation: 33 m (108 ft)
- Population (2023): 684
  - Density: 16.8/km^{2} (43.5/sq mi)
- Time zone: UTC+01:00 (CET)
  - Summer (DST): UTC+02:00 (CEST)
- INSEE/Postal code: 40250 /40090
- ^{1} French Land Register data, which excludes lakes, ponds, glaciers > 1 km^{2} (0.386 sq mi or 247 acres) and river estuaries.

Saint-Avit (French pronunciation: [sɛ̃.t‿avit]; Occitan: Sent Avit) is a commune in the Landes department in Nouvelle-Aquitaine in southwestern France.

== Population ==
Historical population
Year	Pop.	±% p.a.
1968	281	—
1975	263	−0.94%
1982	411	+6.59%
1990	481	+1.99%
1999	538	+1.25%
2007	618	+1.75%
2012	581	−1.23%
2017	672	+2.95%
2023	684	+0.30%
Source: INSEE

== See also ==
- Communes of the Landes department
