= Canton of Mont-de-Marsan-2 =

Small group of communes in southwestern France

Coordinates: 43.88°N 0.50°W

The canton of Mont-de-Marsan-2 is an administrative division of the Landes department, southwestern France. It was created at the French canton reorganisation which came into effect in March 2015. Its seat is in Mont-de-Marsan.

It consists of the following communes:

1. Benquet
2. Bougue
3. Bretagne-de-Marsan
4. Campagne
5. Laglorieuse
6. Mazerolles
7. Mont-de-Marsan (partly)
8. Saint-Perdon
9. Saint-Pierre-du-Mont
