= Château de Laurens Castelet =

Château in Landes, Nouvelle-Aquitaine, France

Coordinates: 43°50′01″N 0°29′54″W

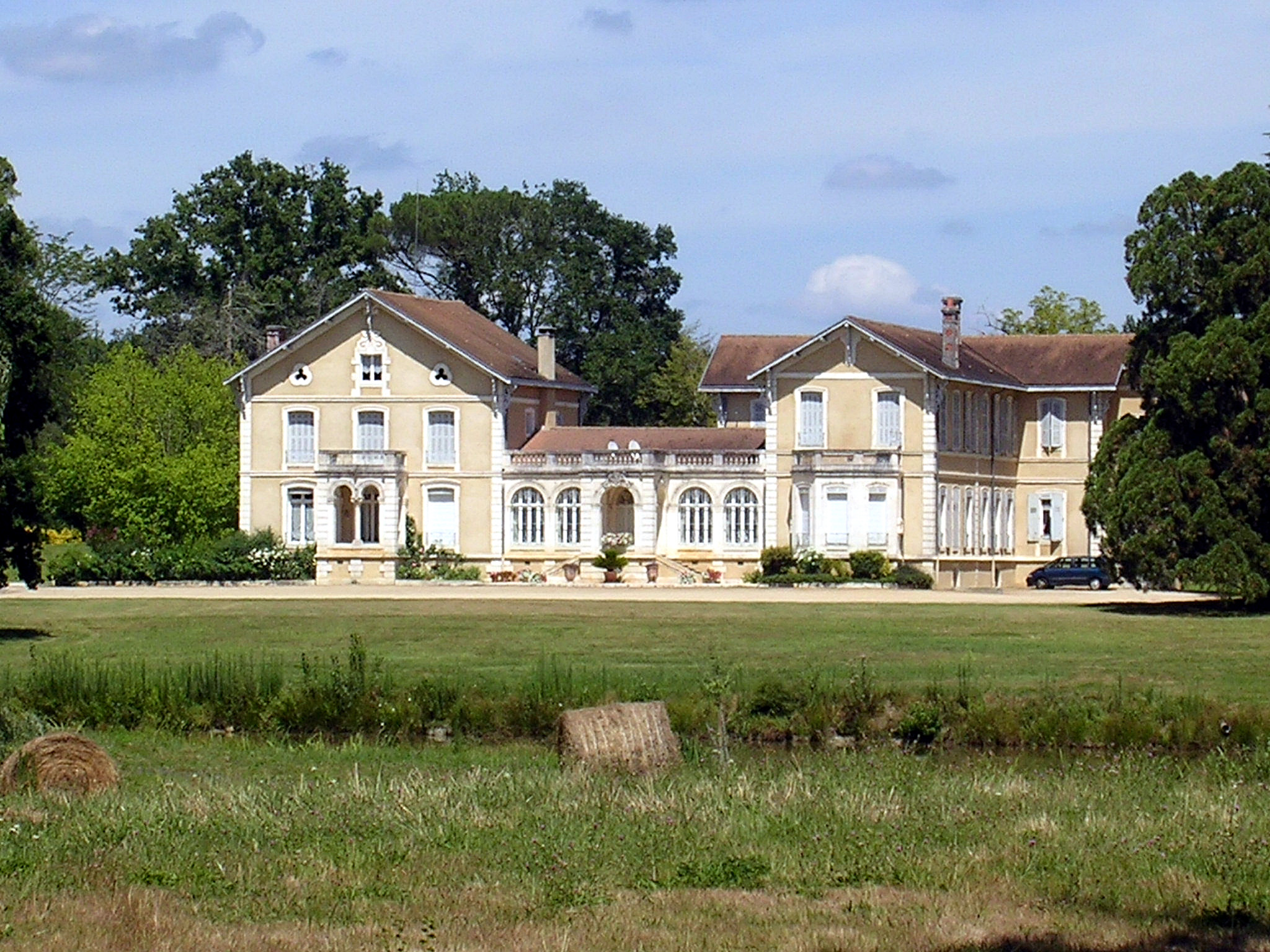

Château de Laurens Castelet is a château in Benquet, Landes, Nouvelle-Aquitaine, France. It dates to 1872.

== History ==
The estate was owned by Count Papin during the Revolution. He became a deputy in 1799 and died in 1809. His family lived there until 1855, when the property was in ruins. The Marquis de Cornulier bought the land, which included over thirty farms, and moved to the area in 1836.

In 1855, the marquis built a simple house. After his death in 1862, his descendants built a castle in 1872, incorporating the old house as the left wing. The Cornulier family, who donated land for a new church in the 1880s, sold the estate in 1996.

== Location ==
The estate of Laurens-Castelet is located on Avenue du Marsan, between the town of Benquet and the Saint-Jean-Baptiste Church, in the Landes department, a few kilometers south of Mont-de-Marsan.

== Architecture ==
The castle consists of two wings joined by a gallery, with the entire structure being two stories high. The right, or south, wing is shaped like an inverted "T". While it features some decorative elements like a baluster and arch-shaped gallery bays, the overall design is elegant but not overly luxurious. The structure includes a large living room with wooden walls, a small living room, a dining room, and a hallway connecting the two wings. Upstairs, there are nine bedrooms. Nearby, there is a building called 'the garage,' which hid an American pilot, Maj. Wayne Eveland, during World War II after his plane was shot down near Arengosse. A century-old cedar tree once stood on the property, but it was destroyed by storms in the 2000s.
