= Bougue =

- Commune
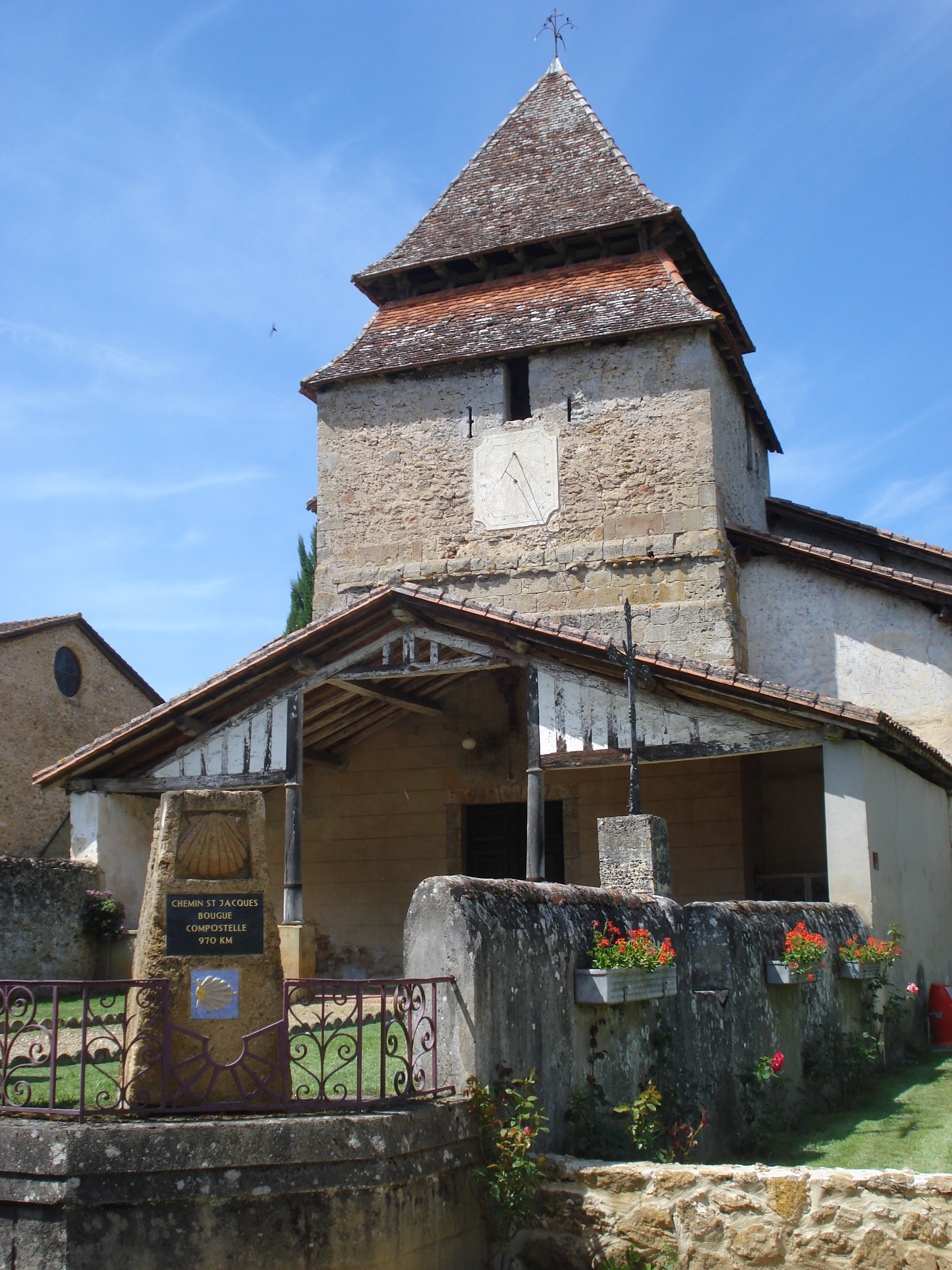
- Location of Bougue
- Location within France Location within Nouvelle-Aquitaine
- Coordinates: 43°53′28″N 0°23′29″W
- Country: France
- Region: Nouvelle-Aquitaine
- Department: Landes
- Arrondissement: Mont-de-Marsan
- Canton: Mont-de-Marsan-2
- Intercommunality: Mont-de-Marsan Agglomération

Government
  - Mayor (2020–2026): Jean-Guy Baché
- Area^{1}: 21.96 km^{2} (8.48 sq mi)
- Highest elevation: 96 m (315 ft)
- Lowest elevation: 34 m (112 ft)
- Population (2023): 833
  - Density: 37.9/km^{2} (98.2/sq mi)
- Time zone: UTC+01:00 (CET)
  - Summer (DST): UTC+02:00 (CEST)
- INSEE/Postal code: 40051 /40090
- ^{1} French Land Register data, which excludes lakes, ponds, glaciers > 1 km^{2} (0.386 sq mi or 247 acres) and river estuaries.

Bougue (French pronunciation: [buɡ]; Occitan: Boga) is a commune in the Landes department in Nouvelle-Aquitaine in southwestern France.

== Population ==
Historical population
Year	Pop.	±% p.a.
1968	332	—
1975	309	−1.02%
1982	420	+4.48%
1990	503	+2.28%
1999	526	+0.50%
2007	566	+0.92%
2012	673	+3.52%
2017	774	+2.84%
2023	833	+1.23%
Source: INSEE

== See also ==
- Communes of the Landes department
