= Mazerolles, Landes =

Mazerolles
- Commune
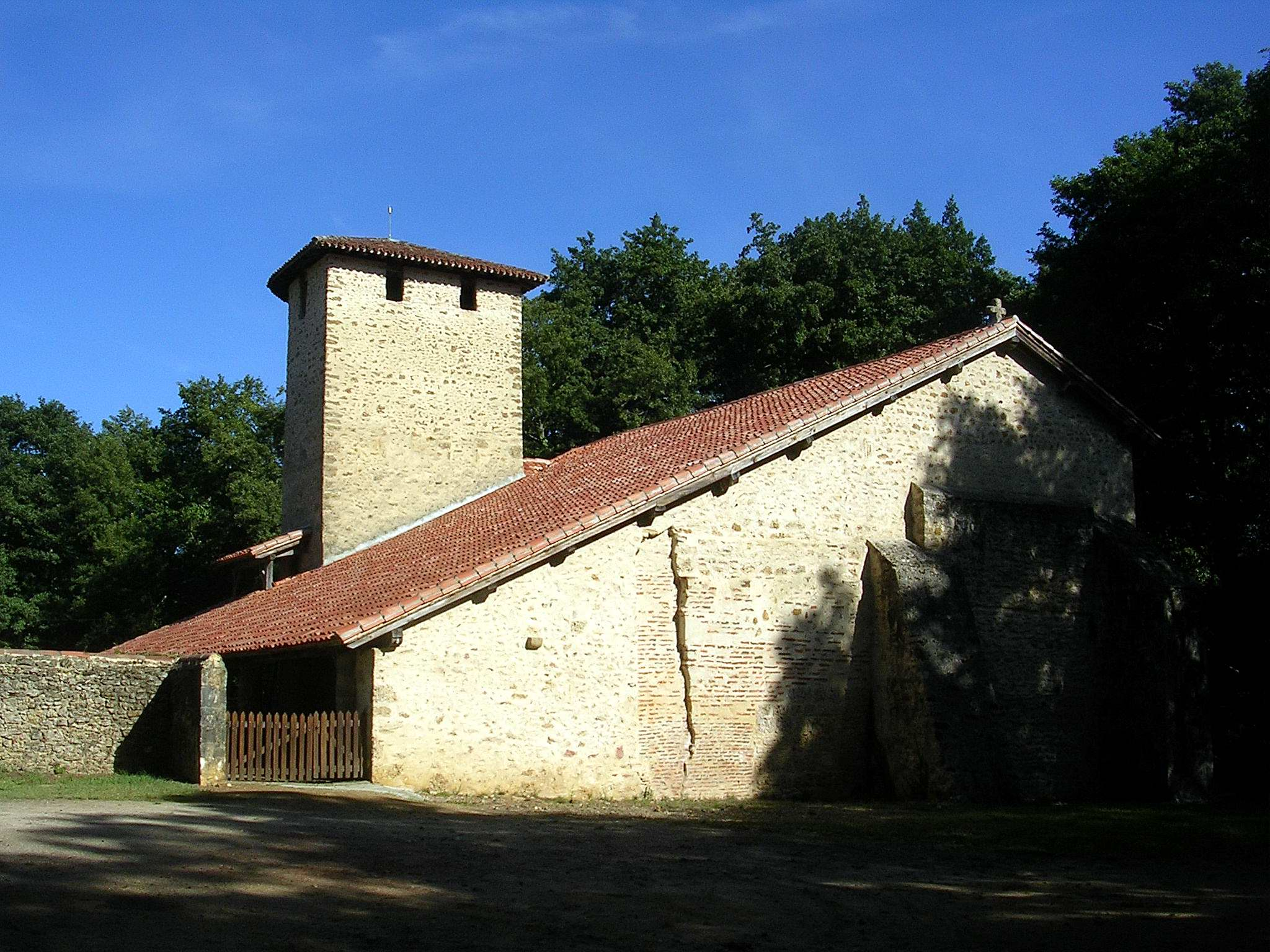
- The church of Beaussiet, in Mazerolles
- Location of Mazerolles
- Location within France Location within Nouvelle-Aquitaine
- Coordinates: 43°52′34″N 0°26′07″W
- Country: France
- Region: Nouvelle-Aquitaine
- Department: Landes
- Arrondissement: Mont-de-Marsan
- Canton: Mont-de-Marsan-2
- Intercommunality: Mont-de-Marsan Agglomération

Government
  - Mayor (2020–2026): Catherine Demémes
- Area^{1}: 15.97 km^{2} (6.17 sq mi)
- Elevation: 84 m (276 ft)
- Highest elevation: 107 m (351 ft)
- Lowest elevation: 34 m (112 ft)
- Population (2023): 715
  - Density: 44.8/km^{2} (116/sq mi)
- Time zone: UTC+01:00 (CET)
  - Summer (DST): UTC+02:00 (CEST)
- INSEE/Postal code: 40178 /40090
- ^{1} French Land Register data, which excludes lakes, ponds, glaciers > 1 km^{2} (0.386 sq mi or 247 acres) and river estuaries.

Mazerolles is a commune in the Landes department in Nouvelle-Aquitaine in south-western France.

== See also ==
- Communes of the Landes department
