= Campet-et-Lamolère =

- Commune
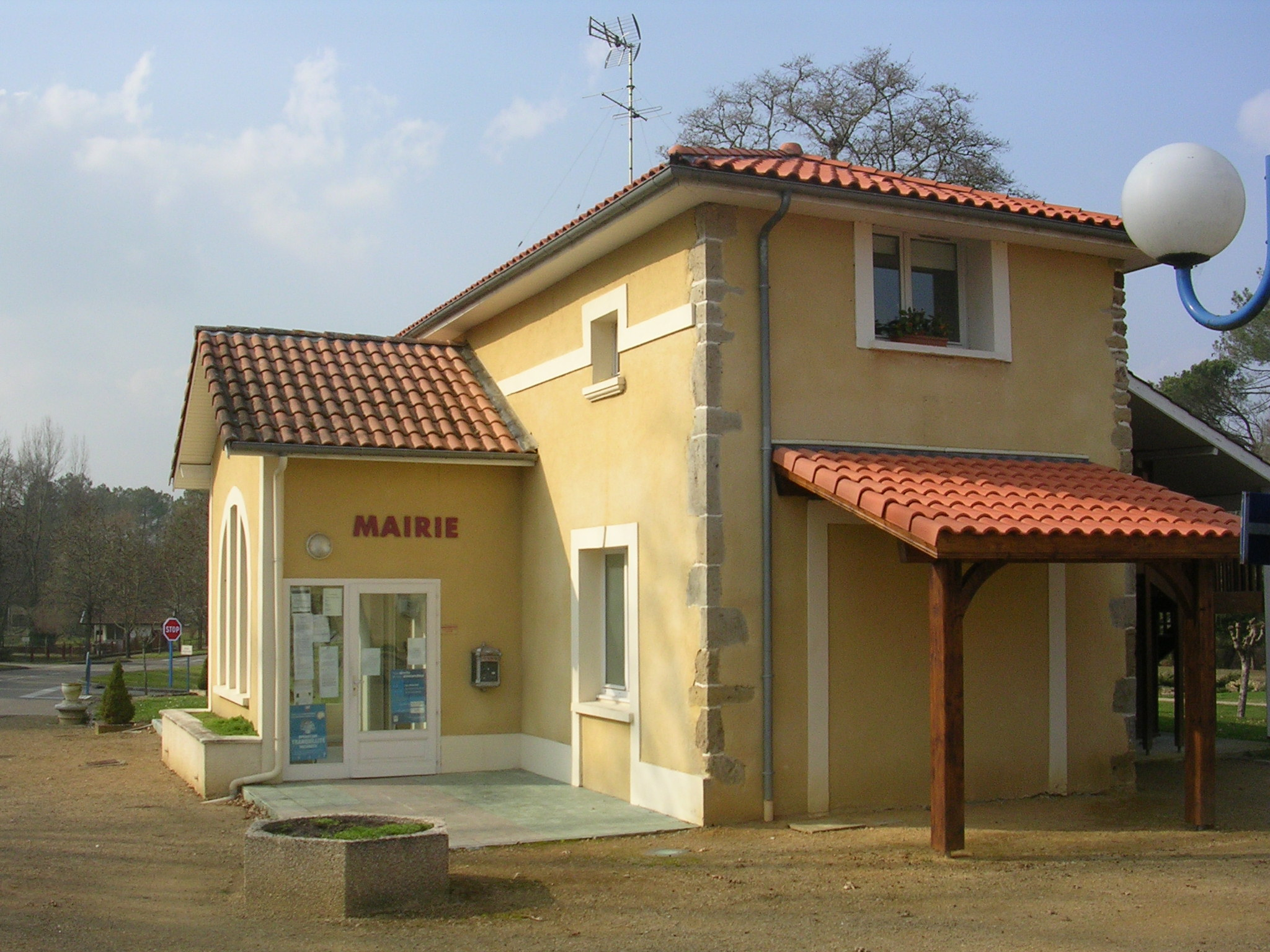
- Town hall
- Location of Campet-et-Lamolère
- Location within France Location within Nouvelle-Aquitaine
- Coordinates: 43°55′09″N 0°36′19″W
- Country: France
- Region: Nouvelle-Aquitaine
- Department: Landes
- Arrondissement: Mont-de-Marsan
- Canton: Mont-de-Marsan-1
- Intercommunality: Mont-de-Marsan Agglomération

Government
  - Mayor (2020–2026): Emilie Labeyrie
- Area^{1}: 18.97 km^{2} (7.32 sq mi)
- Elevation: 40 m (130 ft)
- Highest elevation: 56 m (184 ft)
- Lowest elevation: 18 m (59 ft)
- Population (2023): 506
  - Density: 26.7/km^{2} (69.1/sq mi)
- Time zone: UTC+01:00 (CET)
  - Summer (DST): UTC+02:00 (CEST)
- INSEE/Postal code: 40062 /40090
- ^{1} French Land Register data, which excludes lakes, ponds, glaciers > 1 km^{2} (0.386 sq mi or 247 acres) and river estuaries.

Campet-et-Lamolère (French pronunciation: [kɑ̃pɛt e lamɔlɛʁ];Gascon: Campet e La Molèra) is a commune in the Landes department in Nouvelle-Aquitaine in southwestern France.

== Population ==
Historical population
Year	Pop.	±% p.a.
1968	317	—
1975	274	−2.06%
1982	291	+0.86%
1990	280	−0.48%
1999	266	−0.57%
2007	332	+2.81%
2012	339	+0.42%
2017	441	+5.40%
2023	506	+2.32%
Source: INSEE

== See also ==
- Communes of the Landes department
