= Pouydesseaux =

- Commune
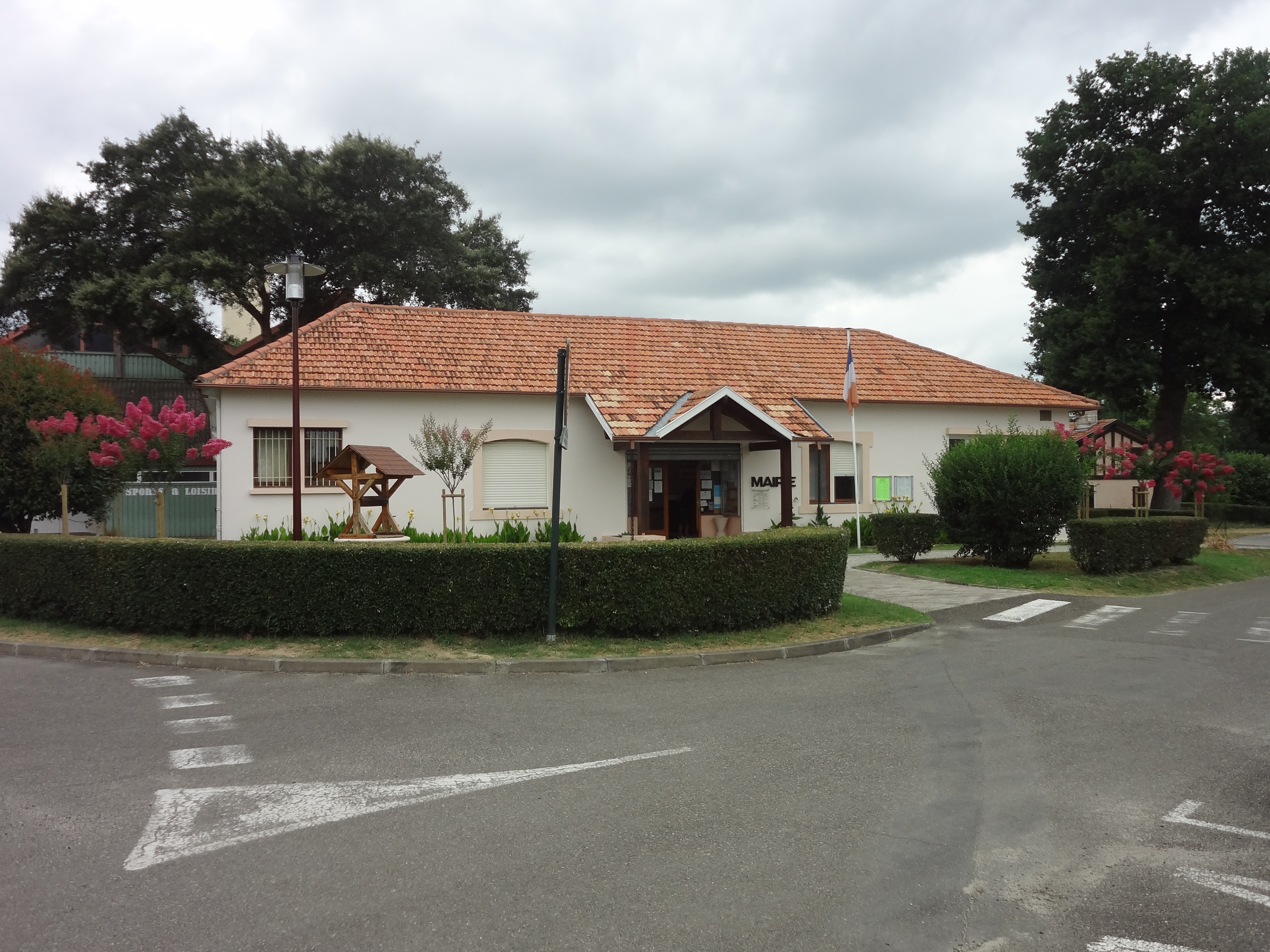
- Town hall
- Location of Pouydesseaux
- Location within France Location within Nouvelle-Aquitaine
- Coordinates: 43°58′13″N 0°19′26″W
- Country: France
- Region: Nouvelle-Aquitaine
- Department: Landes
- Arrondissement: Mont-de-Marsan
- Canton: Mont-de-Marsan-1
- Intercommunality: Mont-de-Marsan Agglomération

Government
  - Mayor (2020–2026): Véronique Gleyze
- Area^{1}: 34.09 km^{2} (13.16 sq mi)
- Elevation: 122 m (400 ft)
- Highest elevation: 136 m (446 ft)
- Lowest elevation: 48 m (157 ft)
- Population (2023): 869
  - Density: 25.5/km^{2} (66.0/sq mi)
- Time zone: UTC+01:00 (CET)
  - Summer (DST): UTC+02:00 (CEST)
- INSEE/Postal code: 40234 /40120
- ^{1} French Land Register data, which excludes lakes, ponds, glaciers > 1 km^{2} (0.386 sq mi or 247 acres) and river estuaries.

Pouydesseaux (French pronunciation: [pwidɛso]; Occitan: Poi de Sauç) is a commune in the Landes department in Nouvelle-Aquitaine in southwestern France.

== Population ==
Historical population
Year	Pop.	±% p.a.
1968	488	—
1975	489	+0.03%
1982	467	−0.66%
1990	616	+3.52%
1999	624	+0.14%
2007	859	+4.08%
2012	915	+1.27%
2017	916	+0.02%
2023	869	−0.87%
Source: INSEE

== See also ==
- Communes of the Landes department
