= Laglorieuse =

- Commune
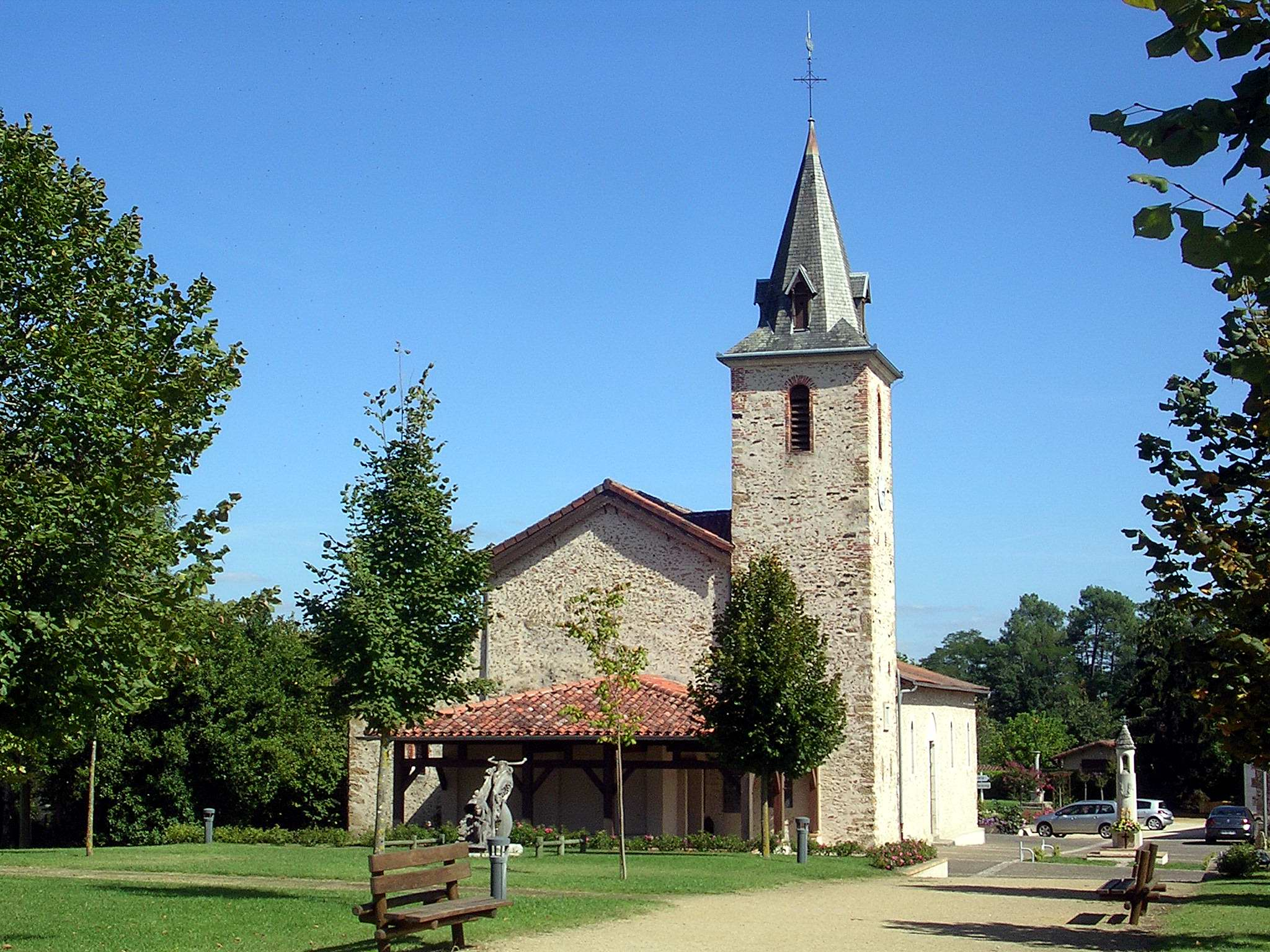
- The church in Laglorieuse

- Coat of arms
- Location of Laglorieuse
- Location within France Location within Nouvelle-Aquitaine
- Coordinates: 43°52′04″N 0°24′16″W
- Country: France
- Region: Nouvelle-Aquitaine
- Department: Landes
- Arrondissement: Mont-de-Marsan
- Canton: Mont-de-Marsan-2
- Intercommunality: Mont-de-Marsan Agglomération

Government
  - Mayor (2024–2026): Marc de Valicourt
- Area^{1}: 11.59 km^{2} (4.47 sq mi)
- Elevation: 90 m (300 ft)
- Highest elevation: 118 m (387 ft)
- Lowest elevation: 52 m (171 ft)
- Population (2023): 626
  - Density: 54.0/km^{2} (140/sq mi)
- Time zone: UTC+01:00 (CET)
  - Summer (DST): UTC+02:00 (CEST)
- INSEE/Postal code: 40139 /40090
- ^{1} French Land Register data, which excludes lakes, ponds, glaciers > 1 km^{2} (0.386 sq mi or 247 acres) and river estuaries.

Laglorieuse (French pronunciation: [laɡlɔʁjøz]; Occitan: La Gloriosa) is a commune in the Landes department at Nouvelle-Aquitaine in south-western France.

== Geography ==
Located in the Pays de Marsan, 8 km south of Mont-de-Marsan, on the edge of the Landes forest and the agricultural region of Chalosse.

== Heraldry ==
Coat of arms of Laglorieuse	Per fess, party per pale in chief: 1 Argent a chevron Azure accompanied by three cauldrons Sable, 2 Azure a garden lily Argent, 3 Vert a fountain of Saint-Guirons du lieu Or, open Sable, drained Gules and flanked by two hawthorn flowers, stemmed and leaved Argent, seeded Or.

== See also ==
- Communes of the Landes department
