= Bretagne-de-Marsan =

- Commune
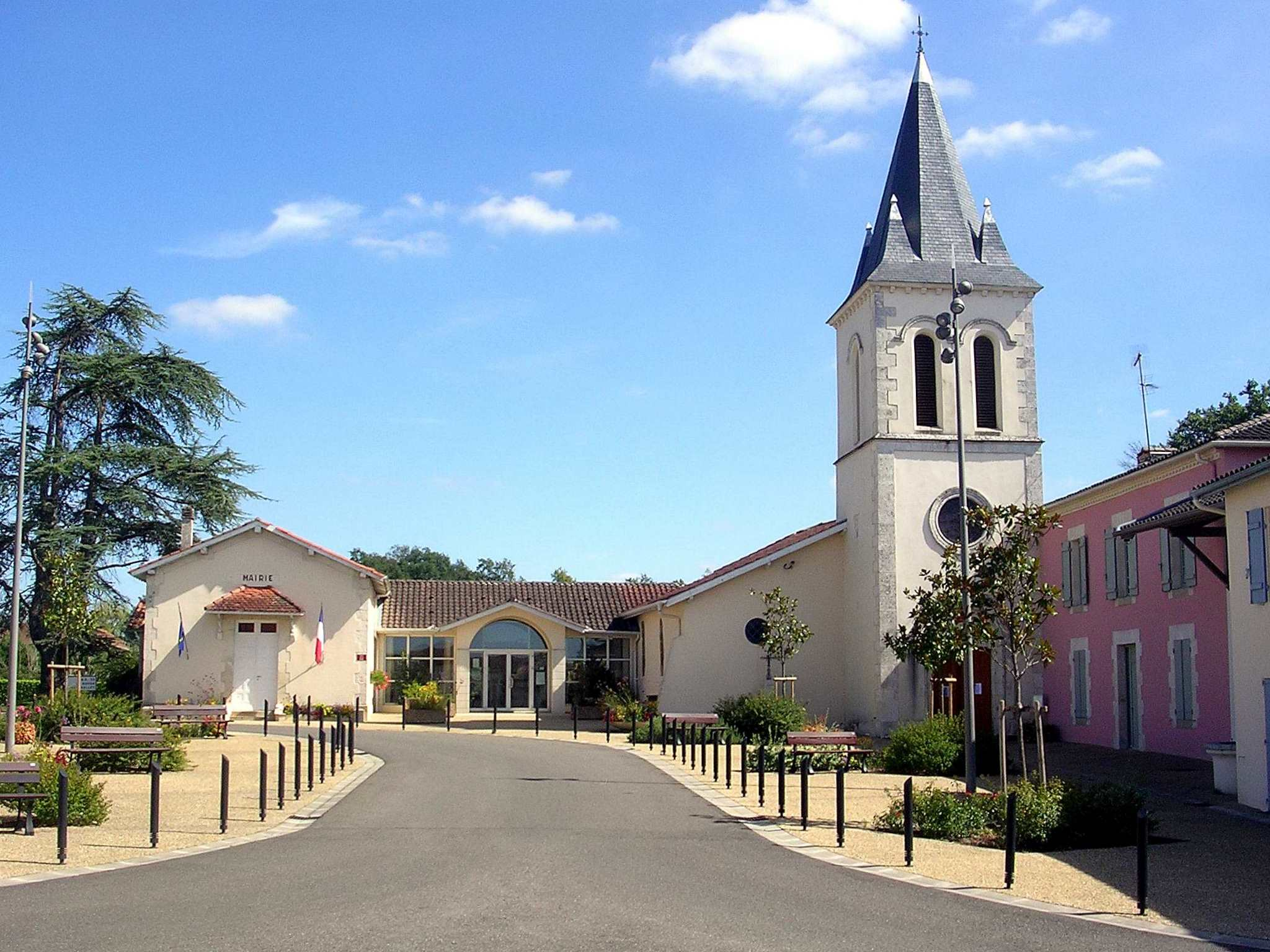
- Town hall and church
- Location of Bretagne-de-Marsan
- Location within France Location within Nouvelle-Aquitaine
- Coordinates: 43°50′54″N 0°27′49″W
- Country: France
- Region: Nouvelle-Aquitaine
- Department: Landes
- Arrondissement: Mont-de-Marsan
- Canton: Mont-de-Marsan-2
- Intercommunality: Mont-de-Marsan Agglomération

Government
  - Mayor (2020–2026): Dominique Clavé
- Area^{1}: 12.93 km^{2} (4.99 sq mi)
- Elevation: 83 m (272 ft)
- Highest elevation: 97 m (318 ft)
- Lowest elevation: 62 m (203 ft)
- Population (2023): 1,618
  - Density: 125.1/km^{2} (324.1/sq mi)
- Time zone: UTC+01:00 (CET)
  - Summer (DST): UTC+02:00 (CEST)
- INSEE/Postal code: 40055 /40280
- ^{1} French Land Register data, which excludes lakes, ponds, glaciers > 1 km^{2} (0.386 sq mi or 247 acres) and river estuaries.

Bretagne-de-Marsan (French pronunciation: [bʁətaɲ də maʁsɑ̃]; Occitan: Bretanha de Marsan) is a commune in the Landes department in Nouvelle-Aquitaine in southwestern France.

== Population ==
Historical population
Year	Pop.	±% p.a.
1968	542	—
1975	573	+0.80%
1982	750	+3.92%
1990	834	+1.34%
1999	911	+0.99%
2007	1,223	+3.75%
2012	1,490	+4.03%
2017	1,544	+0.71%
2023	1,618	+0.78%
Source: INSEE

== See also ==
- Communes of the Landes department
