= Gaillères =

- Commune
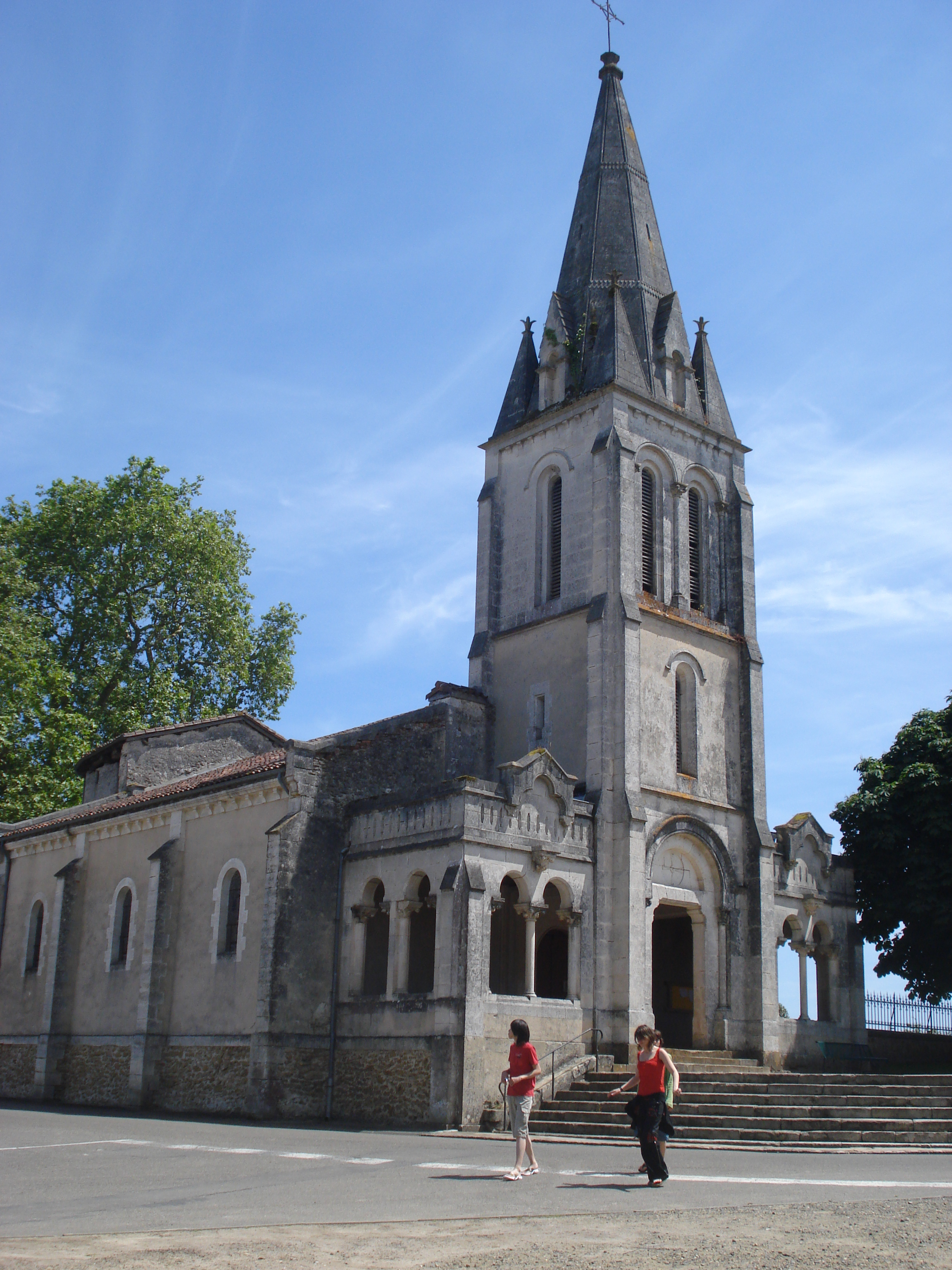
- Location of Gaillères
- Location within France Location within Nouvelle-Aquitaine
- Coordinates: 43°56′29″N 0°22′18″W
- Country: France
- Region: Nouvelle-Aquitaine
- Department: Landes
- Arrondissement: Mont-de-Marsan
- Canton: Mont-de-Marsan-1
- Intercommunality: Mont-de-Marsan Agglomération

Government
  - Mayor (2020–2026): Catherine Bergalet
- Area^{1}: 14.04 km^{2} (5.42 sq mi)
- Highest elevation: 102 m (335 ft)
- Lowest elevation: 63 m (207 ft)
- Population (2023): 653
  - Density: 46.5/km^{2} (120/sq mi)
- Time zone: UTC+01:00 (CET)
  - Summer (DST): UTC+02:00 (CEST)
- INSEE/Postal code: 40103 /40090
- ^{1} French Land Register data, which excludes lakes, ponds, glaciers > 1 km^{2} (0.386 sq mi or 247 acres) and river estuaries.

Gaillères (French pronunciation: [ɡajɛʁ]; Occitan: Galhèra) is a commune in the Landes department in Nouvelle-Aquitaine in southwestern France.

== Population ==
Historical population
Year	Pop.	±% p.a.
1968	261	—
1975	265	+0.22%
1982	348	+3.97%
1990	396	+1.63%
1999	430	+0.92%
2007	575	+3.70%
2012	573	−0.07%
2017	613	+1.36%
2023	653	+1.06%
Source: INSEE

== See also ==
- Communes of the Landes department
