= Saint-Pierre-du-Mont, Landes =

Saint-Pierre-du-Mont
- Commune
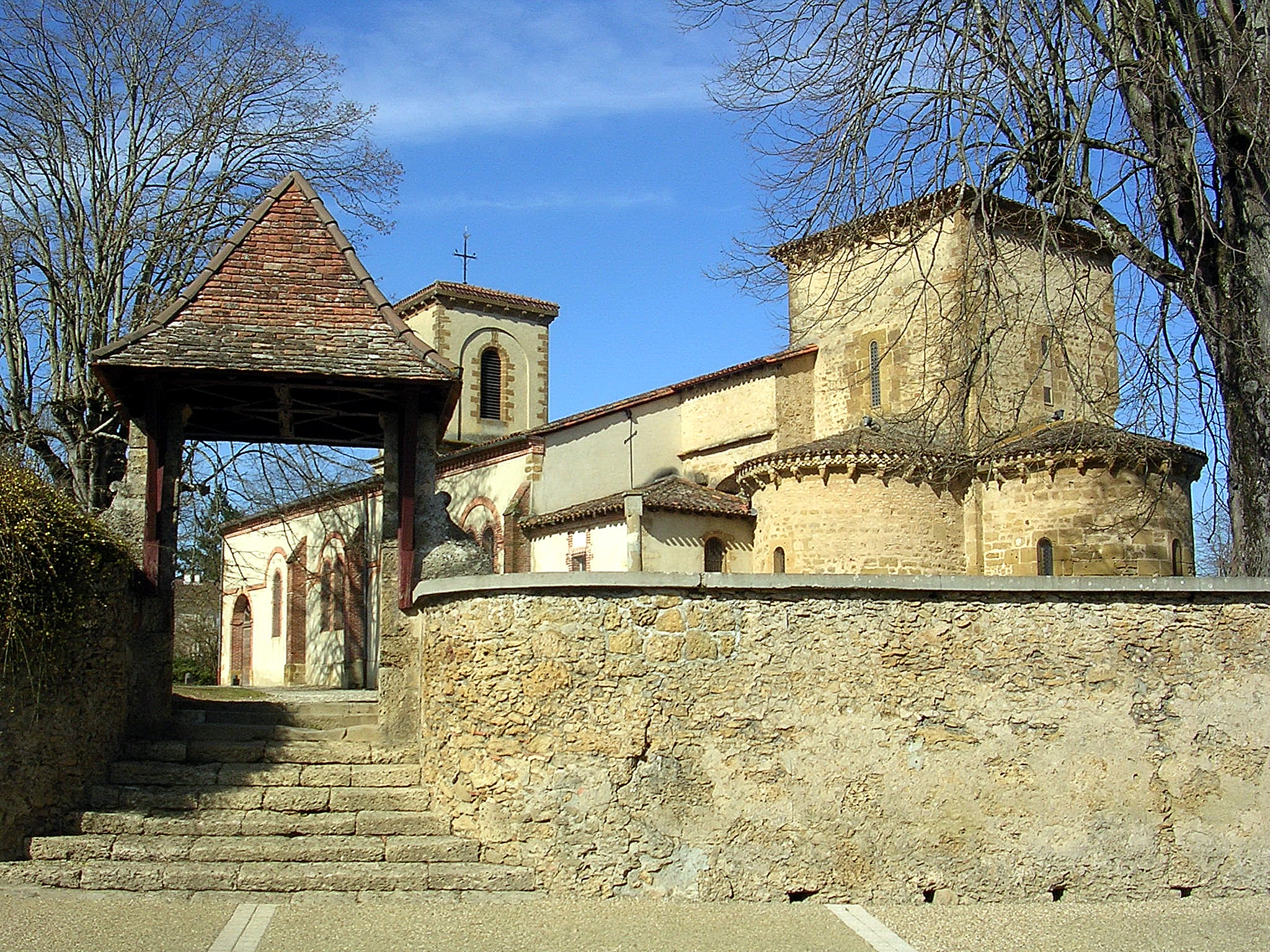

- Coat of arms
- Location of Saint-Pierre-du-Mont
- Location within France Location within Nouvelle-Aquitaine
- Coordinates: 43°53′00″N 0°31′06″W
- Country: France
- Region: Nouvelle-Aquitaine
- Department: Landes
- Arrondissement: Mont-de-Marsan
- Canton: Mont-de-Marsan-2
- Intercommunality: Mont-de-Marsan Agglomération

Government
  - Mayor (2020–2026): Joël Bonnet
- Area^{1}: 26.25 km^{2} (10.14 sq mi)
- Highest elevation: 102 m (335 ft)
- Lowest elevation: 25 m (82 ft)
- Population (2023): 10,092
  - Density: 384.5/km^{2} (995.7/sq mi)
- Time zone: UTC+01:00 (CET)
  - Summer (DST): UTC+02:00 (CEST)
- INSEE/Postal code: 40281 /40280
- ^{1} French Land Register data, which excludes lakes, ponds, glaciers > 1 km^{2} (0.386 sq mi or 247 acres) and river estuaries.

Saint-Pierre-du-Mont (French pronunciation: [sɛ̃ pjɛʁ dy mɔ̃]; Gascon: Sent Pèr deu Mont) is a commune in the Landes department in Nouvelle-Aquitaine in southwestern France.

== Population ==
Historical population

Year	Pop.	±% p.a.
1793	1,075	—
1800	1,048	−0.36%
1806	746	−5.51%
1821	1,567	+5.07%
1831	1,358	−1.42%
1836	1,314	−0.66%
1841	1,344	+0.45%
1846	1,448	+1.50%
1851	1,455	+0.10%
1856	1,618	+2.15%
1861	1,698	+0.97%
1866	964	−10.70%
1872	960	−0.07%
1876	940	−0.52%
1881	940	+0.00%
1886	964	+0.51%
1891	954	−0.21%
1896	954	+0.00%
1901	954	+0.00%

Year	Pop.	±% p.a.
1906	1,029	+1.53%
1911	957	−1.44%
1921	901	−0.60%
1926	977	+1.63%
1931	993	+0.33%
1936	1,042	+0.97%
1946	1,156	+1.04%
1954	1,342	+1.88%
1962	2,254	+6.70%
1968	4,305	+11.39%
1975	6,104	+5.11%
1982	6,290	+0.43%
1990	7,075	+1.48%
1999	7,164	+0.14%
2007	8,421	+2.04%
2012	9,225	+1.84%
2017	9,561	+0.72%
2023	10,092	+0.90%

Source: EHESS and INSEE (1968-2023)

== See also ==
- Communes of the Landes department
