= Uchacq-et-Parentis =

- Commune
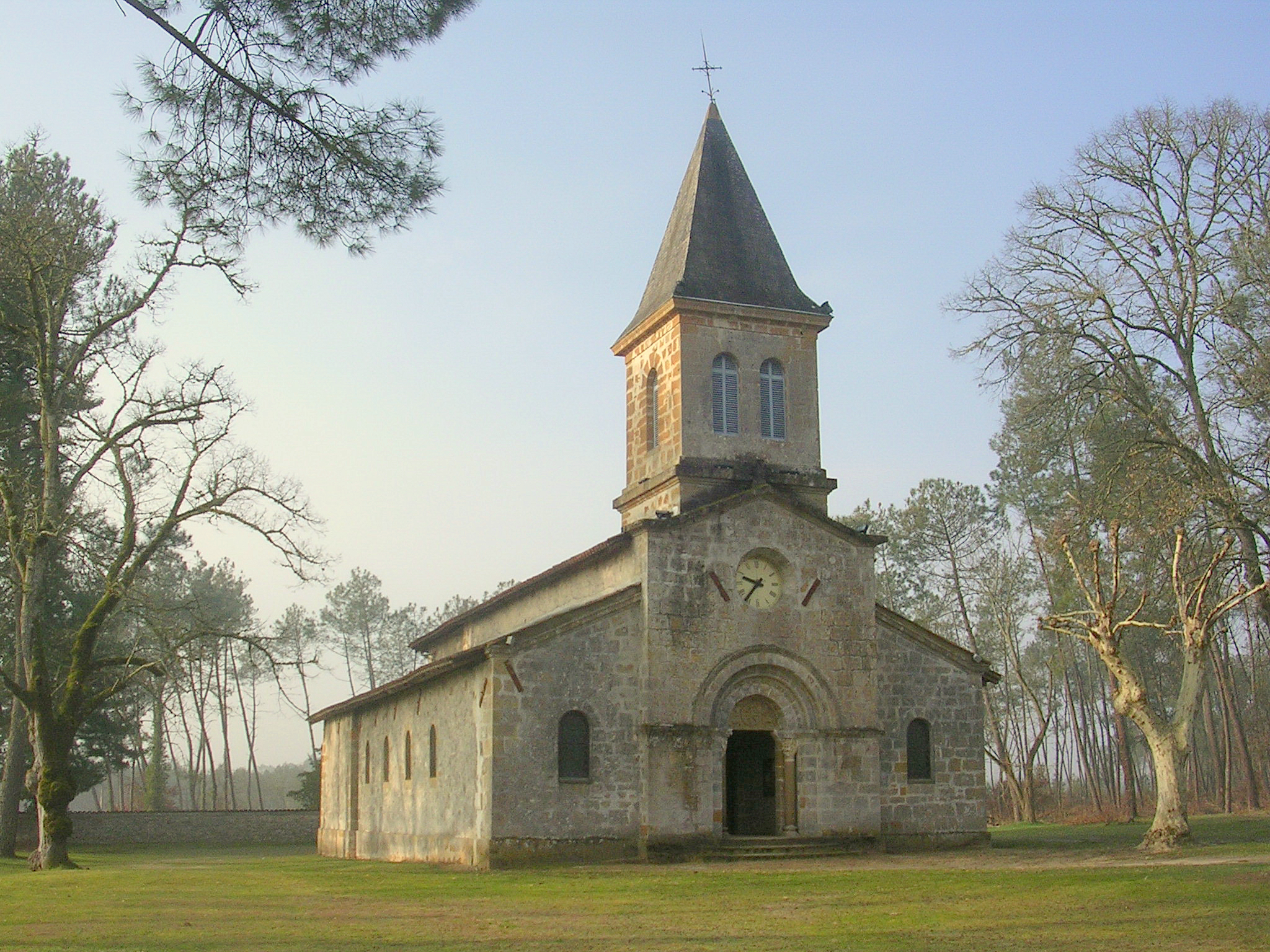
- Location of Uchacq-et-Parentis
- Location within France Location within Nouvelle-Aquitaine
- Coordinates: 43°55′45″N 0°33′33″W
- Country: France
- Region: Nouvelle-Aquitaine
- Department: Landes
- Arrondissement: Mont-de-Marsan
- Canton: Mont-de-Marsan-1
- Intercommunality: Mont-de-Marsan Agglomération

Government
  - Mayor (2020–2026): Denis Capdeviolle
- Area^{1}: 38.58 km^{2} (14.90 sq mi)
- Elevation: 45 m (148 ft)
- Highest elevation: 74 m (243 ft)
- Lowest elevation: 28 m (92 ft)
- Population (2023): 626
  - Density: 16.2/km^{2} (42.0/sq mi)
- Time zone: UTC+01:00 (CET)
  - Summer (DST): UTC+02:00 (CEST)
- INSEE/Postal code: 40320 /40090
- ^{1} French Land Register data, which excludes lakes, ponds, glaciers > 1 km^{2} (0.386 sq mi or 247 acres) and river estuaries.

Uchacq-et-Parentis (French pronunciation: [yʃak e paʁɑ̃tis]; Occitan: Uishac e Parentís) is a commune in the Landes department in Nouvelle-Aquitaine in southwestern France.

== Population ==
Historical population
Year	Pop.	±% p.a.
1968	360	—
1975	356	−0.16%
1982	365	+0.36%
1990	403	+1.25%
1999	495	+2.31%
2007	574	+1.87%
2012	565	−0.32%
2017	589	+0.84%
2023	626	+1.02%
Source: INSEE

== See also ==
- Communes of the Landes department
