= Geloux =

- Commune
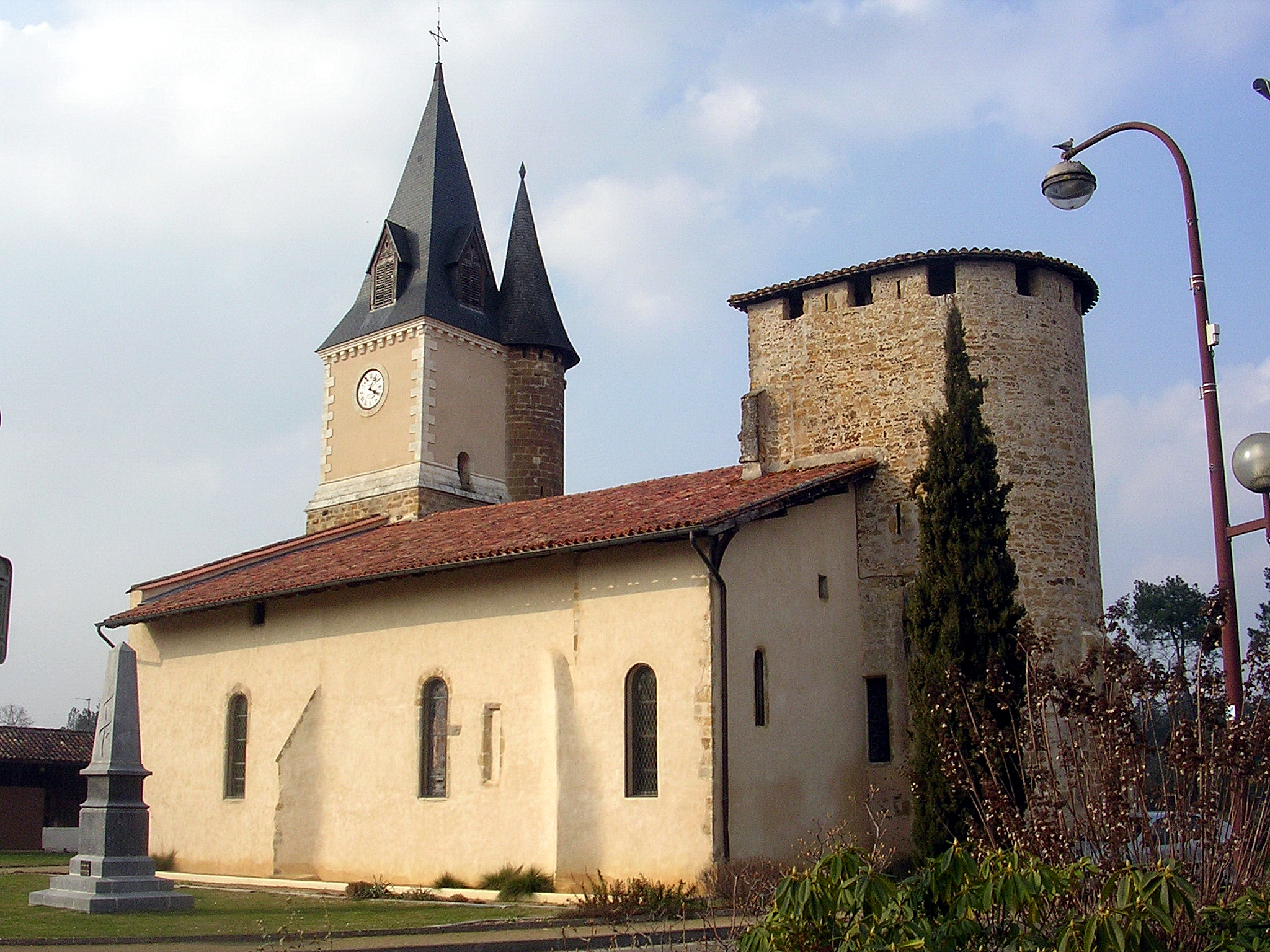
- Location of Geloux
- Location within France Location within Nouvelle-Aquitaine
- Coordinates: 43°58′52″N 0°38′12″W
- Country: France
- Region: Nouvelle-Aquitaine
- Department: Landes
- Arrondissement: Mont-de-Marsan
- Canton: Mont-de-Marsan-1
- Intercommunality: Mont-de-Marsan Agglomération

Government
  - Mayor (2020–2026): Maylis Etcheverry
- Area^{1}: 51.7 km^{2} (20.0 sq mi)
- Elevation: 56 m (184 ft)
- Highest elevation: 84 m (276 ft)
- Lowest elevation: 33 m (108 ft)
- Population (2023): 719
  - Density: 13.9/km^{2} (36.0/sq mi)
- Time zone: UTC+01:00 (CET)
  - Summer (DST): UTC+02:00 (CEST)
- INSEE/Postal code: 40111 /40090
- ^{1} French Land Register data, which excludes lakes, ponds, glaciers > 1 km^{2} (0.386 sq mi or 247 acres) and river estuaries.

Geloux (French pronunciation: [ʒəluks]; Gascon: Gelós) is a commune in the Landes department in Nouvelle-Aquitaine in southwestern France.

== Population ==
Historical population
Year	Pop.	±% p.a.
1968	420	—
1975	421	+0.03%
1982	421	+0.00%
1990	459	+1.09%
1999	511	+1.20%
2007	675	+3.54%
2012	723	+1.38%
2017	704	−0.53%
2023	719	+0.35%
Source: INSEE

== See also ==
- Communes of the Landes department
