= Saint-Martin-d'Oney =

- Commune
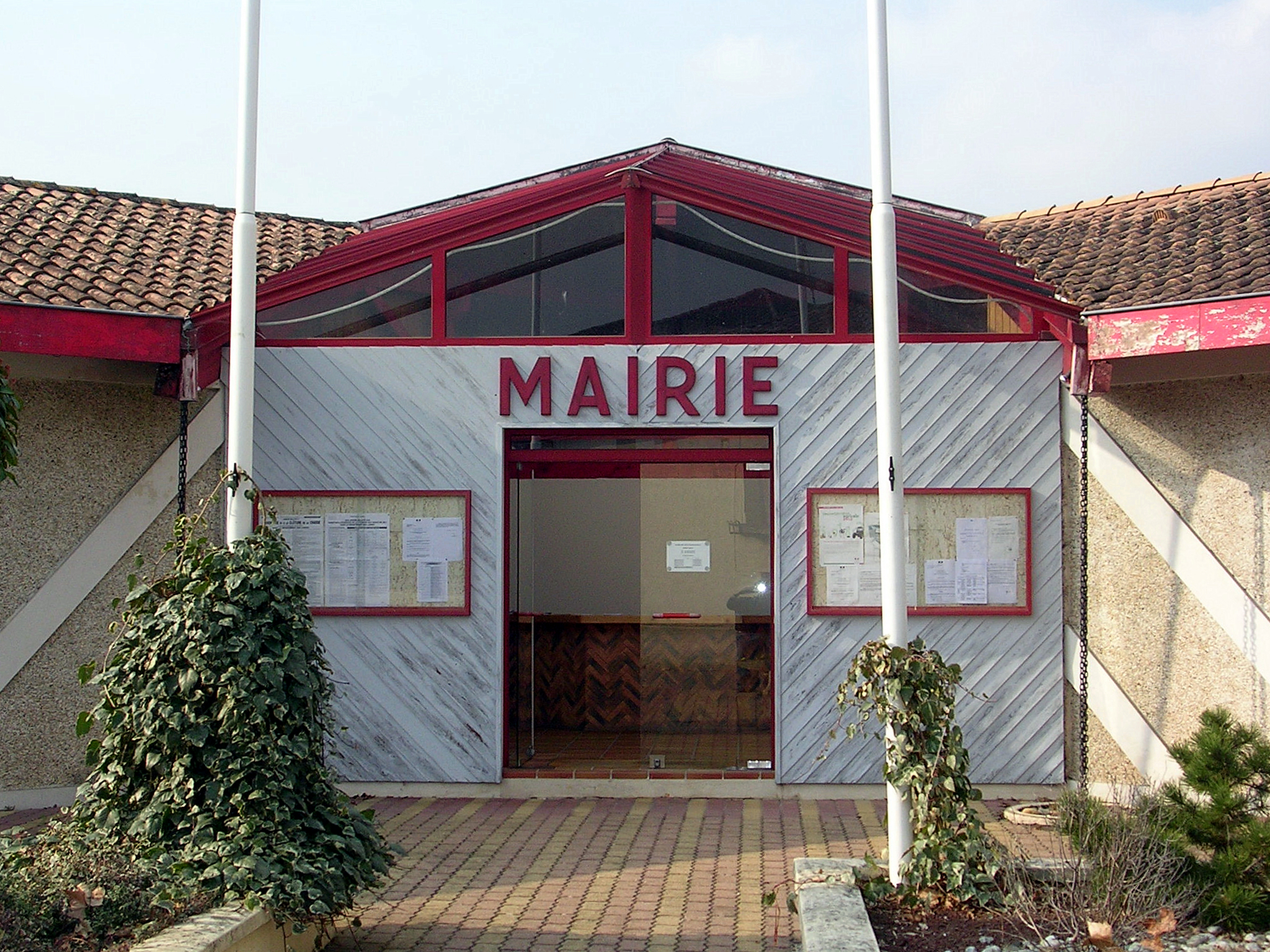
- Town hall
- Location of Saint-Martin-d'Oney
- Location within France Location within Nouvelle-Aquitaine
- Coordinates: 43°55′46″N 0°38′22″W
- Country: France
- Region: Nouvelle-Aquitaine
- Department: Landes
- Arrondissement: Mont-de-Marsan
- Canton: Mont-de-Marsan-1
- Intercommunality: Mont-de-Marsan Agglomération

Government
  - Mayor (2020–2026): Philippe Saës
- Area^{1}: 34.4 km^{2} (13.3 sq mi)
- Elevation: 52 m (171 ft)
- Highest elevation: 67 m (220 ft)
- Lowest elevation: 18 m (59 ft)
- Population (2023): 1,367
  - Density: 39.7/km^{2} (103/sq mi)
- Time zone: UTC+01:00 (CET)
  - Summer (DST): UTC+02:00 (CEST)
- INSEE/Postal code: 40274 /40090
- ^{1} French Land Register data, which excludes lakes, ponds, glaciers > 1 km^{2} (0.386 sq mi or 247 acres) and river estuaries.

Saint-Martin-d'Oney (French pronunciation: [sɛ̃ maʁtɛ̃ donɛj]; Gascon: Sent Martin d'Onei) is a commune in the Landes department in Nouvelle-Aquitaine in southwestern France.

== Population ==
Historical population
| Year | Pop. | ±% p.a. |
|---|---|---|
| 1968 | 845 | — |
| 1975 | 828 | −0.29% |
| 1982 | 844 | +0.27% |
| 1990 | 868 | +0.35% |
| 1999 | 921 | +0.66% |
| 2007 | 1,144 | +2.75% |
| 2012 | 1,347 | +3.32% |
| 2017 | 1,396 | +0.72% |
| 2023 | 1,367 | −0.35% |
Source: INSEE

== See also ==
- Communes of the Landes department
