= Saint-Maurice-sur-Adour =

- Commune
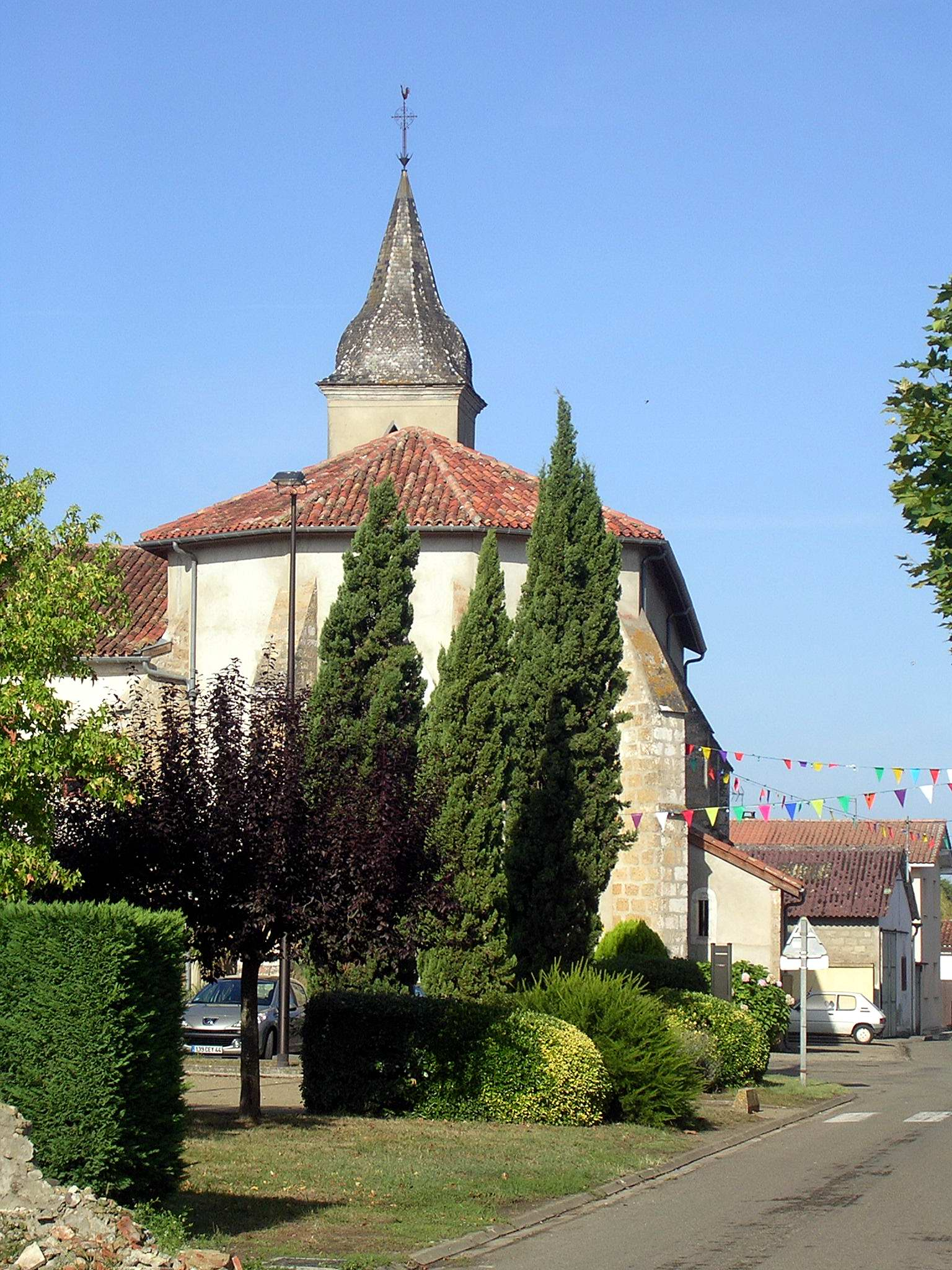

- Coat of arms
- Location of Saint-Maurice-sur-Adour
- Location within France Location within Nouvelle-Aquitaine
- Coordinates: 43°47′09″N 0°27′59″W
- Country: France
- Region: Nouvelle-Aquitaine
- Department: Landes
- Arrondissement: Mont-de-Marsan
- Canton: Adour Armagnac
- Intercommunality: Pays Grenadois

Government
  - Mayor (2020–2026): Jean-Pierre Brethous
- Area^{1}: 9.53 km^{2} (3.68 sq mi)
- Elevation: 52 m (171 ft)
- Highest elevation: 76 m (249 ft)
- Lowest elevation: 41 m (135 ft)
- Population (2023): 625
  - Density: 65.6/km^{2} (170/sq mi)
- Time zone: UTC+01:00 (CET)
  - Summer (DST): UTC+02:00 (CEST)
- INSEE/Postal code: 40275 /40270
- ^{1} French Land Register data, which excludes lakes, ponds, glaciers > 1 km^{2} (0.386 sq mi or 247 acres) and river estuaries.

Saint-Maurice-sur-Adour (French: [sɛ̃ mɔʁis syʁ aduʁ]; literally "Saint-Maurice on Adour"; Occitan: Sent Maurici d'Ador) is a commune in the Landes department in Nouvelle-Aquitaine in southwestern France.

== Description ==
The commune of Saint-Maurice-sur-Adour is located south of Mont-de-Marsan. It originated as a bastide (fortified town) built in the 13th century by Edward II of England. The village is rustic, and contains a 16th-century church and the Château de Saint Maurice.

== Population ==
Historical population
Year	Pop.	±% p.a.
1968	292	—
1975	376	+3.68%
1982	484	+3.67%
1990	490	+0.15%
1999	509	+0.42%
2007	621	+2.52%
2012	562	−1.98%
2017	584	+0.77%
2023	625	+1.14%
Source: INSEE

== See also ==
- Communes of the Landes department

== Sources ==
- "Saint Maurice sur Adour", Landes tourisme (in French)
