= Eraillure =

In lithic analysis (a subdivision of archaeology), an eraillure is a flake removed from a lithic flake's bulb of force, which is a lump left on the ventral surface of a flake after it is detached from a core of tool stone during the process of lithic reduction. The mechanics of eraillure formation are related to the propagation of a Hertzian cone of force through the cryptocrystalline matrix of the stone, but the particulars are poorly understood. Eraillures usually form only when a hammerstone is used for lithic reduction, and then only occasionally; use of 'soft' hammer fabricators made from bone, antler, and wood produce different flake characteristics but may also produce an eraillure in rare cases.

== See also ==
- Stone tool
