= Lithic blade =

Type of stone tool

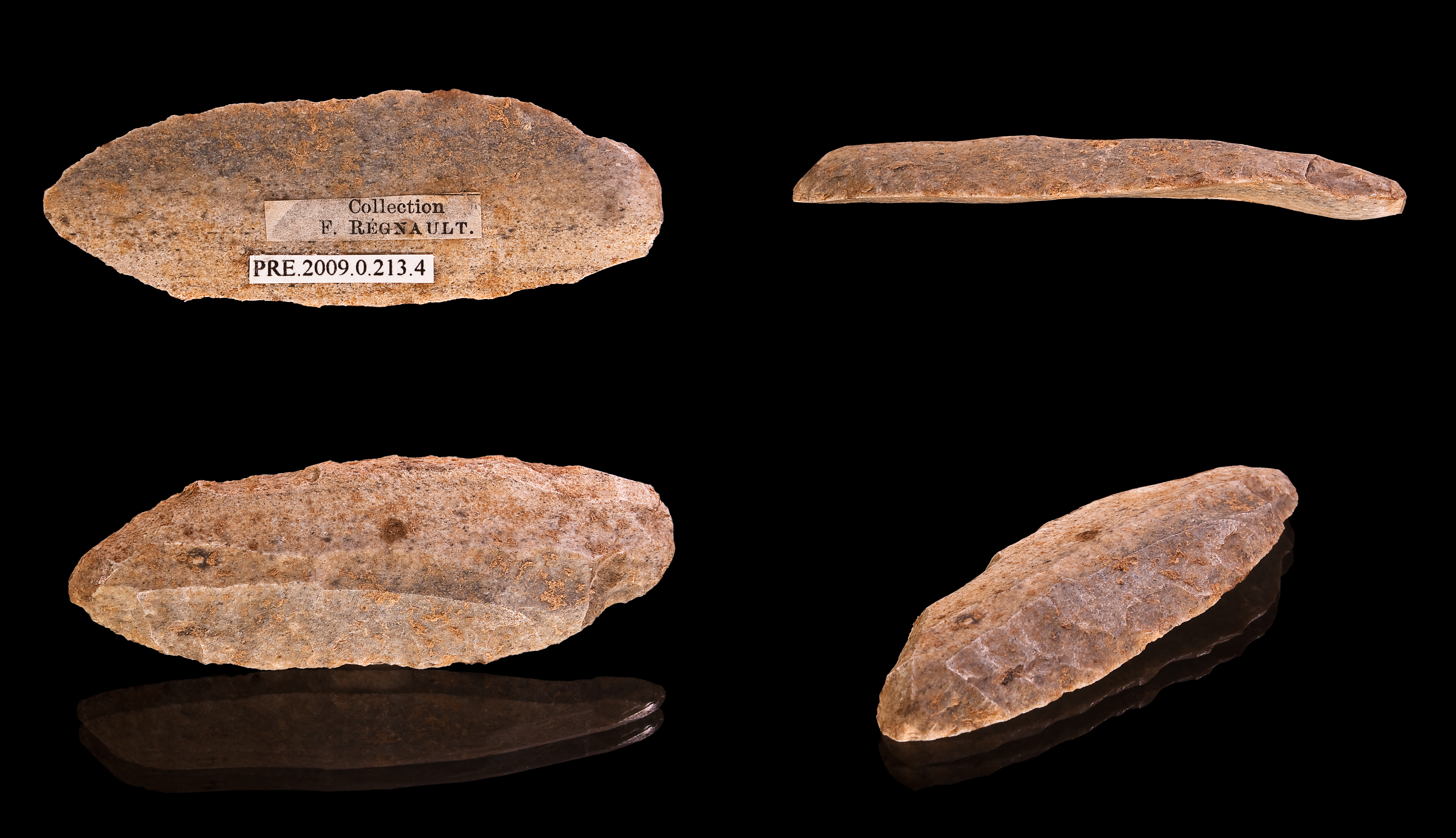
Flint blade from Lithic reduction - Upper Paleolithic -Brassempouy, France - Muséum of Toulouse

In archaeology, a lithic blade is a type of stone tool created during lithic reduction by striking a long narrow flake from a stone core. Lithic blades are generally defined as being flakes that are at least twice as long as they are wide. Lithic blades are generally created using stones that have a cryptocrystalline structure. Blades are highly prominent in cultures of the Upper Palaeolithic and Mesolithic eras, although they are occasionally found in earlier periods.

The long sharp edges of lithic blades made them useful for a variety of purposes. After blades are flaked, they are often incorporated as parts of larger tools, such as serving as the heads of spears. Other times, the simple shape and sharpness serves the designed role. Blades were often employed in the impression process of material culture, assisting ancient humans in imprinting ornate designs into other parts of their material culture. Scrapers, used for hide working or woodworking, or burins, used for engraving, are two common such examples.

Cores from which blades have been struck are called blade cores and the tools created from single blades are called blade tools. Small examples (under 12 mm) are called microblades and were used in the Mesolithic as elements of composite tools. Blades with one edge blunted by removal of tiny flakes are called backed blades. A blade core becomes an exhausted core when there are no more useful angles to knock off blades.

Blades can be classified into many different types depending on their shape and size. Archaeologists have also been known to use the microscopic striations created from the lithic reduction process to classify the blades into specific types. Once classified archaeologists can use this information to see how the blade was produced, who produced it, and how it was used.

== Archaeological analysis ==
Archaeologists employ numerous methods to study both lithic and obsidian blades. Each method contributes to the overall understanding of blades and their roles in past societies.

- Trace Element Analysis (Obsidian) - This method of analysis involves measurements of the elemental composition of obsidian blades using the most common method of X-ray fluorescence (XRF). This allows researchers to select chemical compounds and compare them to known geological sources and identify patterns of procurement, trade, and distribution.
- Use-Wear Analysis - This method examines the microscopic traces left on blades or tools from use. Based on the examination of wear patterns, archaeologists are able to infer activities such as cutting, scraping, sawing, or hammering.
- Microscopic Analysis - This method of analysis utilizes microscopy techniques to examine both the external structure of lithic blades and the internal structure of obsidian blades. This allows researchers to identify manufacturing techniques such as heat treatment or pressure flaking for lithics blades and identify volcanic glass textures, such as microlite and flow banding in obsidian blades.
- Experimental Archaeology - This method involves replicating techniques and processes believed to be the same used to produce ancient tools and blades. Archaeologists use this method to gain first-hand experience on how these tools may have been used for and why they may have been produced.
- Residue Analysis - This method involves extracting and examining organic and inorganic residues left on well-preserved vessel walls or tool surfaces. This method provides insight into potential foodways, ritual activities, subsistence, economy, and tool function. Some methods that are used include Liquid chromatography, Gas chromatography, and Stable Isotope analysis.
- Obsidian Hydration Dating - Is a geochemical method of determining age in either absolute or relative terms of an artifact made of obsidian.

== Function and use ==
Like the many methods of studyng lithic blades, there is a significant amount of uses these blades could have served.

- Butchering and Cutting - Lithic blades were primarily used for cutting and carving tasks. They were essential for activities such as butchering animals, preparing food, crafting tools and utensils, and shaping wood, bone, or other materials.
- Hunting - Lithic blades played a crucial role in hunting and fishing. Groups used blades as components of projectile points and spearheads, which they attached to arrows, spears, or harpoons. These sharp blades increased the efficiency of hunting and fishing activities.
- Processing foods and materials - Lithic blades were employed in processing plant materials. Groups used blades to harvest plants, cut fibers for weaving baskets or mats, prepare materials for cordage, and process seeds or grains for food preparation.
- Blades held ceremonial and symbolic significance for many indigenous groups in California. They were incorporated into rituals, dances, and sacred ceremonies, often representing strength, power, or ancestral connections.

The role of functions and use vary between tribes and regions. Lithic and obsidian blades played a major role in many of their daily aspect of life.

== Cultural implications ==
Blade technology, too, is able to provide researchers with understanding of the social realms of the culture in question. For example, in 2002 an article was published concerning research done in Tehran, Iran. The research focused on six late prehistoric sites which coincidentally had a large focus of blade production. The main focus of the paper concentrated on the early Chalcolithic and showed that as time passed and the chopper tools became more prominent, stone tools became less aesthetically pleasing. Thus, there was a collapse of lithic craft specialization. Wherein raw material was being sent out and coming back in as blades, people were producing their own blades at home. The raw materials that these tools were made of were also very diverse. 92% of the Chalcolithic tool variety was a product of chert, a sedimentary rock indigenous to the area and easily harvested. Other raw materials found in the collection, such as obsidian, suggested that trading and expeditions were sources for blade cores, too, as these raw materials were not readily available. The provenance of parts of a culture's material culture illuminates common trade patterns and needs of that society for archaeologists. If the resources are not available, how they traded these raw materials such as obsidian to improve their blades and stone tool technology.

Likewise, the blades and blade cores located in the Ambergris Caye Museum dated to Mayan inhabitation showed heavy reliance on obsidian. Because obsidian is not natural to Belize, the site of excavation, the obsidian cores were the product of transactions between the Mayans and those in present-day Honduras, Mexico and Guatemala. Obsidian blades are the sharpest natural cutting edges known, and after the lithic reduction already fractured blades, the triangular heads were produced. These obsidian blades were used as the Mayans' primary cutting utensil. During the 1890s in California, obsidian blades held significant cultural value and were seen as heirlooms within certain tribes. Many were reluctant to show these blades which were usually hidden away where only the owner knew the location until it was passed down.

== See also ==
- Prismatic blade
- Lithic technology
