= Prismatic blade =

Long, narrow, specialized stone flake tool with a sharp edge, like a small razor blade

In archaeology, a prismatic blade is a long, narrow, specialized stone flake tool with a sharp edge, like a small razor blade. Blade segments were sometimes distributed and exchanged, rather than a complete blade. This includes proximal, medial, and distal blade segments. The ratios of these segments can be used to determine whether tools were exchanged as complete blades or just fragments. Prismatic blades are flaked from stone cores through pressure flaking or direct percussion. However, the steps of blade production could be different between regions and time periods in Mesoamerica. It’s important to mention that much of what we know about blade production comes from only a few sites that were studied. This process results in a very standardized finished tool and waste assemblage. This waste consisted of flakes created when knappers made errors or material imperfections that had to be corrected during core reduction. The most famous and most prevalent prismatic blade material is obsidian, as obsidian use was widespread in Mesoamerica, though chert, flint, and chalcedony blades are not uncommon. The term is generally restricted to Mesoamerican archaeology, although some examples are found in the Old World, for example in a Minoan grave in Crete.

Prismatic blades were used for cutting and scraping, and have been reshaped into other tool types, such as projectile points and awls. Additionally, broken blade fragments could be reused and turned into retouched points/punches, notched blades, and scrapers produced from transverse core tabs or longitudinal core fragments.

== Morphology ==
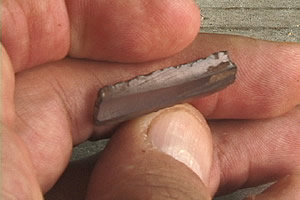
An obsidian prismatic blade fragment from Chunchucmil, Yucatán, Mexico

Prismatic blades are often trapezoidal in cross section, but very close in appearance to an isosceles trapezoid. Triangular blades (in cross-section) are also common. The ventral surface of the prismatic blade is very smooth, sometimes bearing slight rippling reflecting the direction of applied force and a very small bulb of applied force (indicative of pressure reduction). Flake scars are absent on the ventral surface of these blades, though eraillure flakes are sometimes present on the bulb. The dorsal surface, on the other hand, exhibits scar ridges running parallel to the long axis of the blade. These facets are created by the previous removal of blades from the core. The proximal end contains the blade's striking platform and its bulb of applied force, while the distal end will consist of a snap break, a feather termination, or a stepped termination.

== Production ==
Obsidian prismatic blade production was ubiquitous in Mesoamerica, and these tools can be found at a large majority of Mesoamerican archaeological sites from the Preclassic period on until the arrival of the Spanish in the early 16th century. Ethnohistoric sources recount the process of prismatic blade production. Fray Motolinia, a Spanish observer, recorded:

It is in this manner: First they get out a knife stone (obsidian core) which is black like jet and 20 cm or slightly less in length, and they make it cylindrical and as thick as the calf of the leg, and they place the stone between the feet, and with a stick apply force to the edges of the stone and, at every push they give, a little knife springs off with its edges like those of a razor.

The production of prismatic blades creates not only a very standardized final product, but also a standardized waste assemblage. The analysis of obsidian debitage can reveal whether or not prismatic blade production occurred at a site and, if it had, what stages of production the process included. In other words, the types of manufacturing waste present (e.g., rejuvenation flakes and/or blades, platform rejuvenation flakes, etc.) at a site can inform archaeologists about the stage in which blades were being produced. Occationally, prepared obsidian cores were imported into the region and brought to settlements where blades were then locally produced. Production included removing the cortex and macroflakes, which created platform surfaces. Then, percussion or crested blades were removed. During this process, flakes were created until there is no more core left.
