= Chert =

Hard, fine-grained sedimentary rock composed of cryptocrystalline silica

- Sedimentary rock
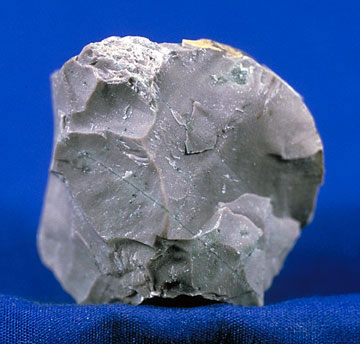
- A hand sized sample of chert

Composition
- Microcrystalline or cryptocrystalline quartz

Chert (/tʃɜːrt/) is a hard, fine-grained sedimentary rock composed of microcrystalline or cryptocrystalline quartz, the mineral form of silicon dioxide (SiO_{2}). Chert is characteristically of biological origin, but may also occur inorganically as a chemical precipitate or a diagenetic replacement, as in petrified wood. Where chert occurs in chalk or marl, it is usually called flint.

Chert is typically composed of the petrified remains of siliceous ooze, the biogenic sediment that covers large areas of the deep ocean floor, and which contains the silicon skeletal remains of diatoms, silicoflagellates, and radiolarians. Precambrian cherts are notable for the presence of fossil cyanobacteria. In addition to microfossils, chert occasionally contains macrofossils. However, some chert is devoid of any fossils.

Chert varies greatly in color, from white to black, but is most often found as gray, brown, grayish brown and light green to rusty red and occasionally as dark green. Its color is an expression of trace elements present in the rock. Both red and green are most often related to traces of iron in its oxidized and reduced forms, respectively.

== Description ==
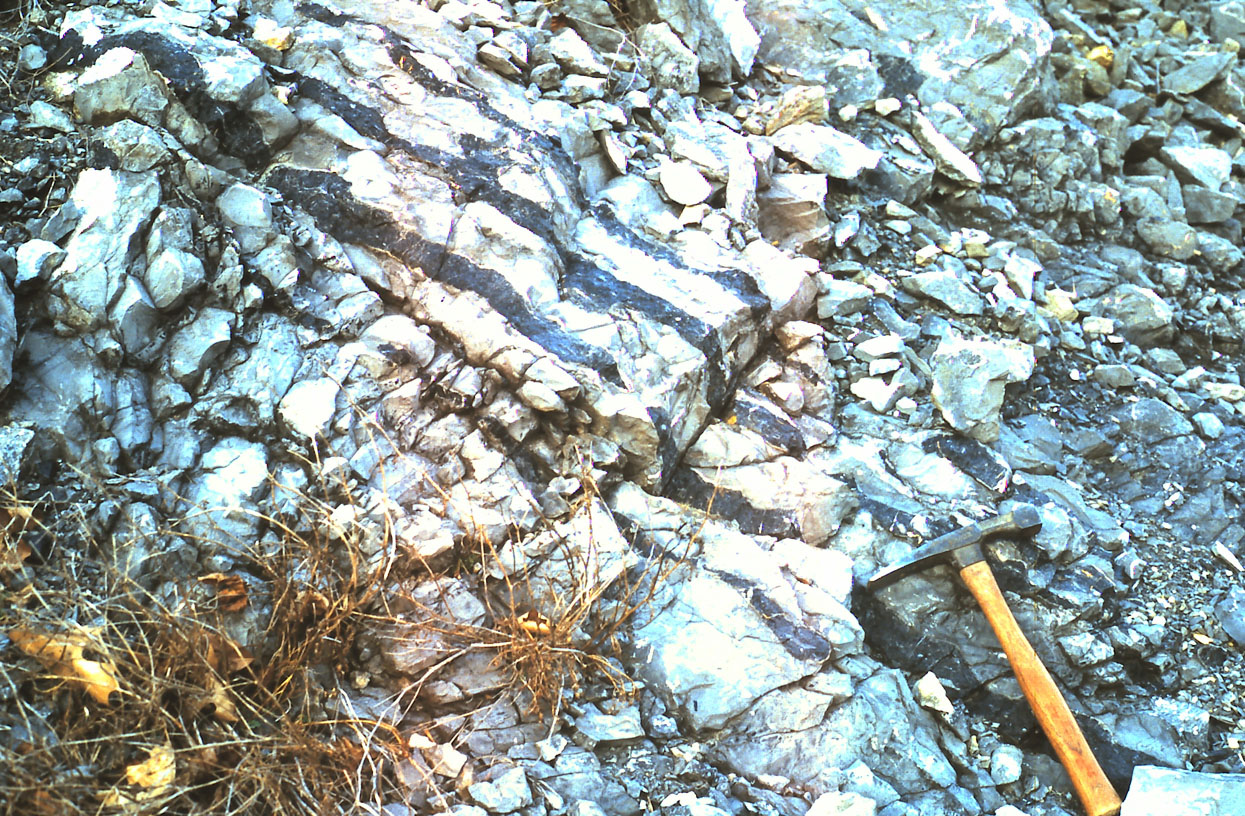
Chert (dark bands) in the Devonian Corriganville-New Creek limestone, Everett, Pennsylvania

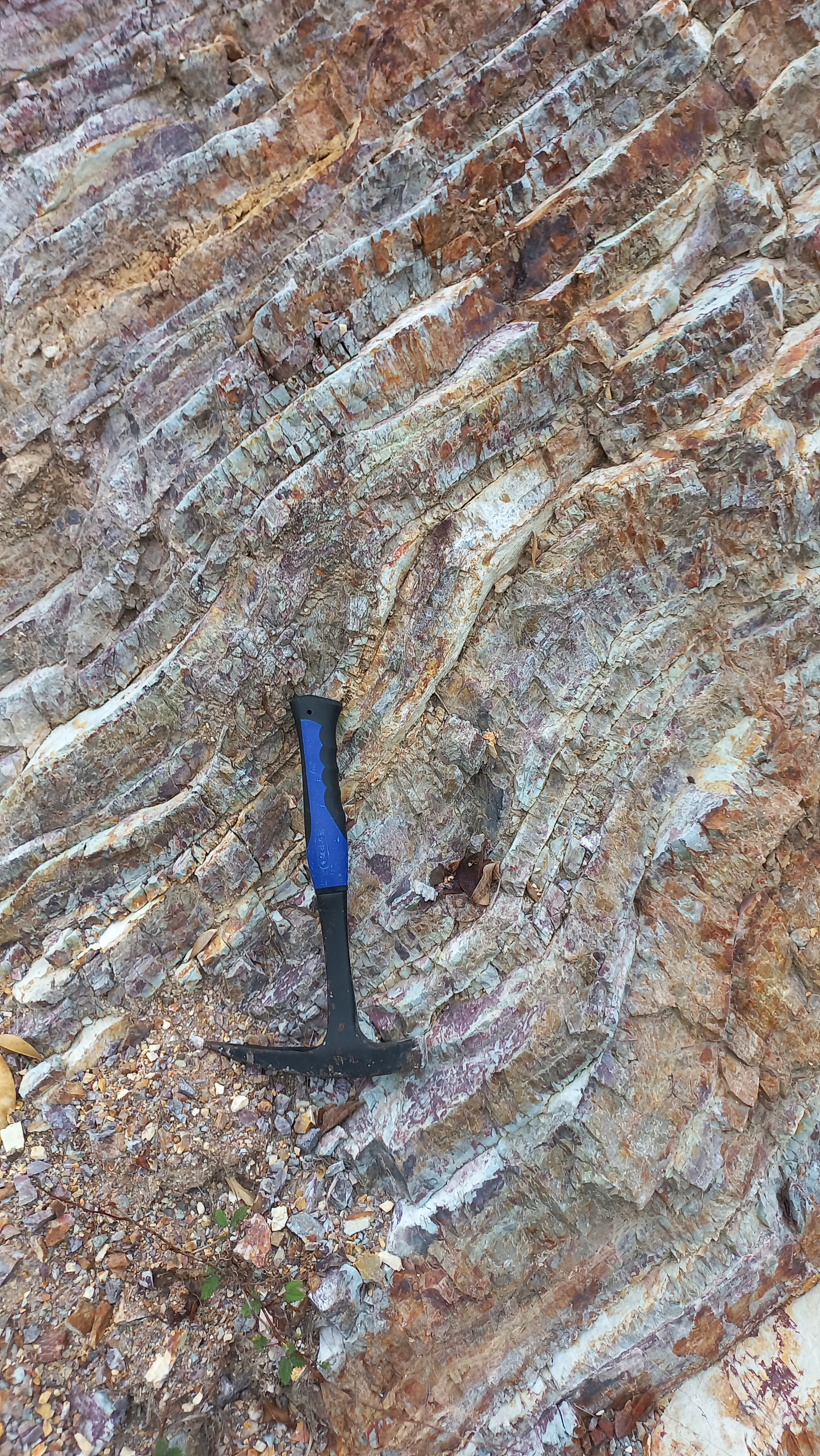
Folded beds of chert comprising the Late Permian to Jurassic-aged Liminangcong Formation at Busuanga, Palawan, Philippines

In petrology, the term "chert" refers generally to all chemically precipitated sedimentary rocks composed primarily of microcrystalline, cryptocrystalline and microfibrous silica. Most cherts are nearly pure silica, with less than 5% other minerals (mostly calcite, dolomite, clay minerals, hematite, and organic matter.) However, cherts range from very pure cherts with over 99% silica content to impure nodular cherts with less than 65% silica content. Aluminium is the most abundant minor element, followed by iron and manganese or potassium, sodium, and calcium. Extracrystalline water (tiny inclusions of water within and around the quartz grains) make up less than 1% of most cherts.

The Folk classification divides chert into three textural categories. Granular microquartz is the component of chert consisting of roughly equidimensional quartz grains, ranging in size from a fraction of a micron to 20 microns, but most typically 8 to 10 microns. Chalcedony is a microfibrous variety of quartz, consisting of radiating bundles of very thin crystals about 100 microns long. Megaquartz is composed of equidimensional grains over 20 microns in size. Most chert is microcrystalline quartz with minor chalcedony and sometimes opal, but cherts range from nearly pure opal to nearly pure quartz chert. However, little opal is over 60 million years old. Opaline chert often contains visible fossils of diatoms, radiolarians, and glass sponge spicules.

Chert is found in settings as diverse as hot spring deposits (siliceous sinter), banded iron formation (jaspilite), or alkaline lakes. However, most chert is found either as bedded chert or as nodular chert. Bedded chert is more common in Precambrian beds, but nodular chert became more common in the Phanerozoic as the total volume of chert in the rock record diminished. Bedded chert is rare after the early Mesozoic. Chert became moderately abundant during the Devonian and Carboniferous and again became moderately abundant from the Jurassic to the present.

=== Bedded chert ===
Bedded chert, also known as ribbon chert, takes the form of thinly bedded layers (a few centimeters to a meter in thickness) of nearly pure chert separated by very thin layers of silica-rich shale. It is usually black to green in color, and the full sequence of beds may be several hundred meters thick. The shale is typically black shale, sometimes with pyrite, indicating deposition in an anoxic environment. Bedded chert is most often found in association with turbidites, deep water limestone, submarine volcanic rock, ophiolites, and mélanges on active margins of tectonic plates. Sedimentary structures are rare in bedded cherts. The typically high purity of bedded chert, like the high purity of other chemically precipitated rock, points to deposition in areas where there is little influx of detrital sediments (such as river water laden with silt and clay particles.) Such impurities as are present include authigenic pyrite and hematite, formed in the sediments after they were deposited, in addition to traces of detrital minerals.

Seawater typically contains between 0.01 and 11 parts per million (ppm) of silica, with around 1 ppm being typical. This is far below saturation, indicating that silica cannot normally be precipitated from seawater through inorganic processes. The silica is instead extracted from seawater by living organisms, such as diatoms, radiolarians, and glass sponges, which can efficiently extract silica even from very unsaturated water, and which are estimated to presently produce 12 cubic kilometers (2.9 cu mi) of opal per year in the world's oceans. Diatoms can double their numbers eight times a day under ideal conditions (though doubling once per day is more typical in normal seawater) and can extract silica from water with as little as 0.1 ppm silica. The organisms protect their skeletons from dissolution by "armoring" them with metal ions. Once the organisms die, their skeletons will quickly dissolve unless they accumulate on the ocean bottom and are buried, forming siliceous ooze that is 30% to 60% silica. Thus, bedded cherts are typically composed mostly of fossil remains of organisms that secrete silica skeletons, which are usually altered by solution and recrystallization.

The skeletons of these organisms are composed of opal-A, an amorphous form of silica, lacking long-range crystal structure. This is gradually transformed to opal-CT, a microcrystalline form of silica composed mostly of bladed crystals of cristobalite and tridymite. Much opal-CT takes the form of lepispheres, which are clusters of bladed crystals about 10 microns in diameter. Opal-CT in turn transforms to microquartz. In deep ocean water, the transition to opal-CT occurs at a temperature of about 45 °C (113 °F) while the transition to microquartz occurs at a temperature of about 80 °C (176 °F). However, the transition temperature varies considerably, and the transition is hastened by the presence of magnesium hydroxide, which provides a nucleus for the recrystallization. Megaquartz forms at elevated temperatures typical of metamorphism.

There is evidence that the variety of chert called porcelainite, which is characterized by a high content of opal-CT, recrystallizes at very shallow depths. The Caballos Novaculite of Texas also shows signs of very shallow water deposition, including shallow water sedimentary structures and evaporite pseudomorphs, which are casts of crystals of soluble minerals that could have formed only in near-surface conditions. This novaculate appears to have formed by replacement of carbonate fecal pellets by chert.

==== Subvarieties ====
Bedded cherts can be further subdivided by the kinds of organisms that produced the silica skeletons.

Diatomaceous chert consists of beds and lenses of diatomite which were converted during diagenesis into dense, hard chert. Beds of marine diatomaceous chert comprising strata several hundred meters thick have been reported from sedimentary sequences such as the Miocene Monterey Formation of California and occur in rocks as old as the Cretaceous. Diatoms were the dominant siliceous organism responsible for extracting silica from seawater from the Jurassic and later.

Radiolarite consists mostly of remains of radiolarians. When the remains are well-cemented with silica, it is known as radiolarian chert. Many show evidence of a deep-water origin, but some appear to have formed in water as shallow as 200 meters (660 ft), perhaps in shelf seas where upwelling of nutrient-rich deep ocean water support high organic productivity. Radiolarians dominated the extraction of silica from seawater prior to the Jurassic.

Spicularite is chert composed of spicules of glass sponges and other invertebrates. When densely cemented, it is known as spicular chert. They are found in association with glauconite-rich sandstone, black shale, clay-rich limestone, phosphorites, and other nonvolcanic rocks typical of water a few hundred meters deep.

Some bedded cherts appear devoid of fossils even under close microscopic examination. Their origin is uncertain, but they may form from fossil remains that are completely dissolved in fluids that then migrate to precipitate their silica load in a nearby bed. Eolian quartz has also been suggested as a source of silica for chert beds. Precambrian bedded cherts are common, making up 15% of middle Precambrian sedimentary rock, and may have been deposited nonbiologically in oceans more saturated in silica than the modern ocean. The high degree of silica saturation was due either to intense volcanic activity or to the lack of modern organisms that remove silica from seawater.

=== Nodular chert ===
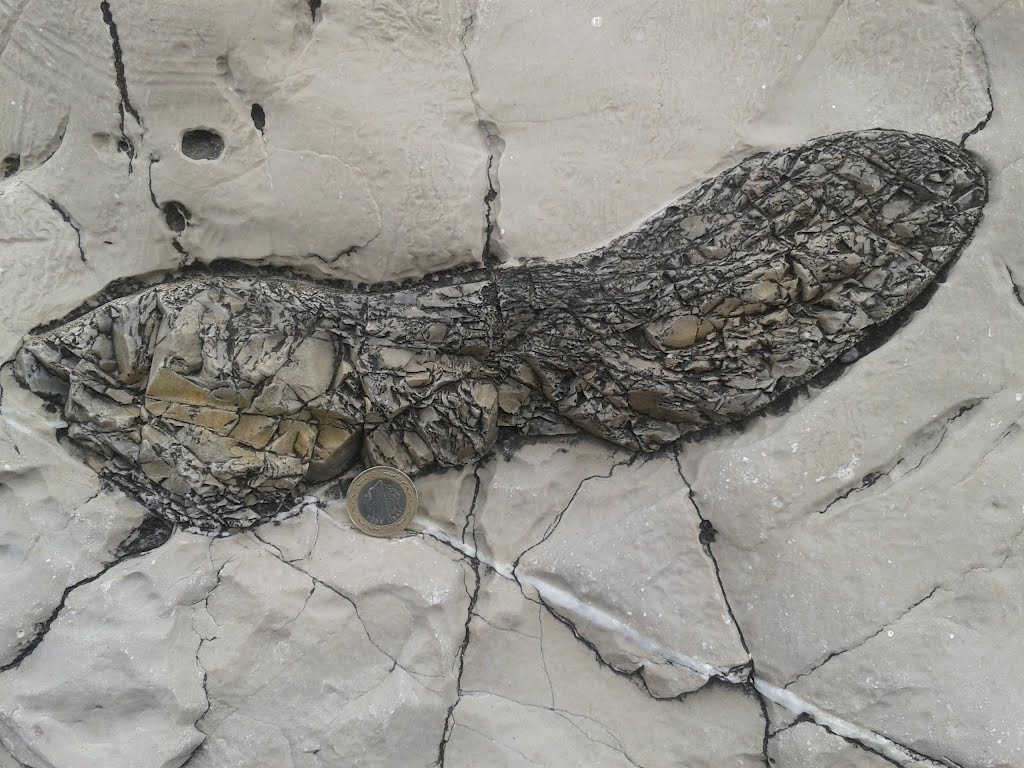
Chert nodule within soft limestone at Akçakoca, Turkey

Nodular chert is most common in limestone but may also be found in shales and sandstones. It is less common in dolomite. Nodular chert in carbonate rocks is found as oval to irregular nodules. These vary in size from powdery quartz particles to nodules several meters in size. The nodules are most typically along bedding planes or stylolite (dissolution) surfaces, where fossil organisms tended to accumulate and provided a source of dissolved silica, but they are sometimes found cutting across bedding surfaces, where the chert fills fossil burrows, fluid escape structures, or fractures. Nodules under a few centimeters in size tend to be egg-shaped, while larger nodules form irregular bodies with knobby surfaces. The outer few centimeters of large nodules may show desiccation cracks with secondary chert, which likely formed at the same time as the nodule. Calcareous fossils are occasionally present that have been completely silicified. Where chert occurs in chalk or marl, it is usually called flint.

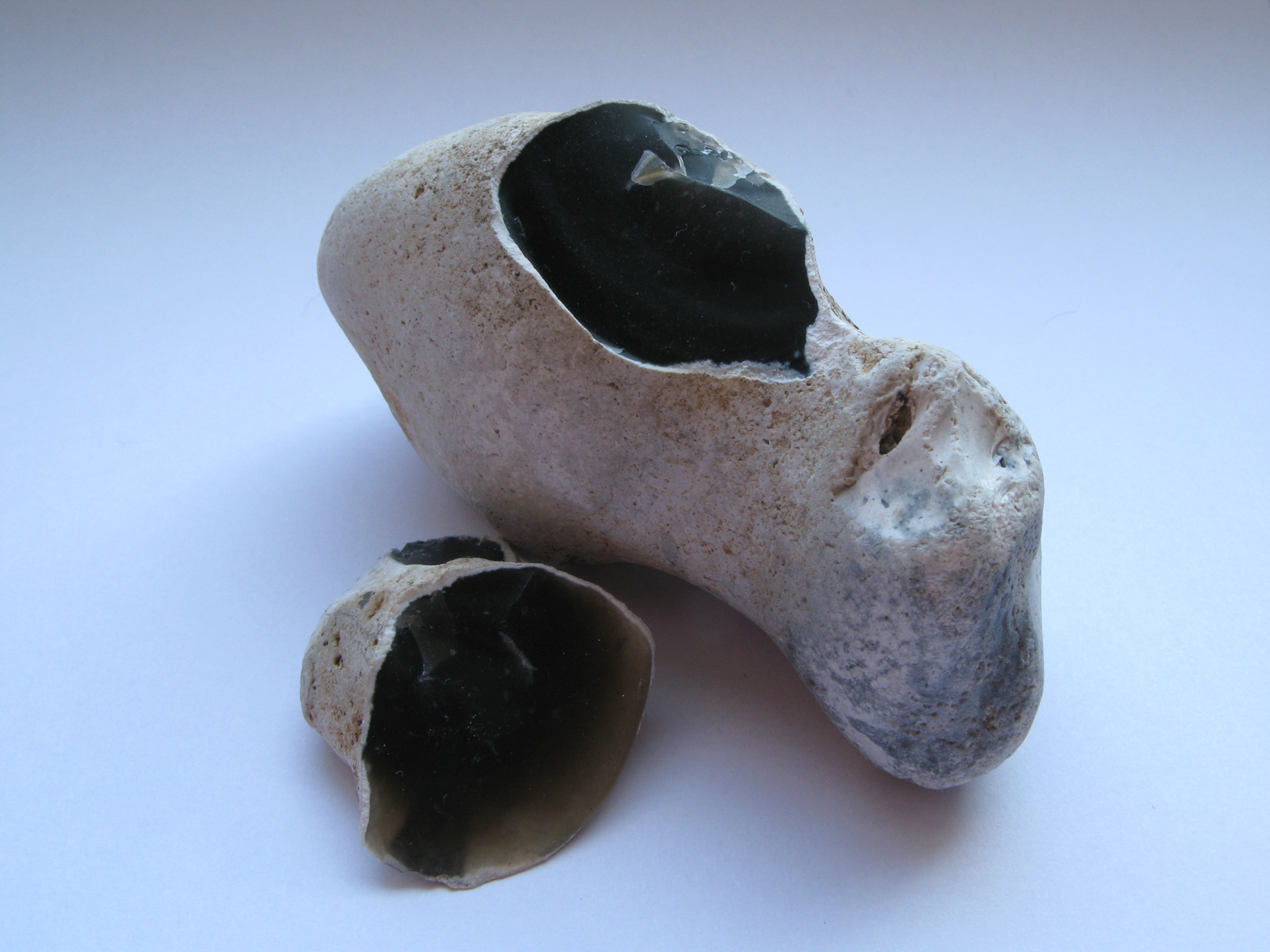
Flint with white weathered crust

Nodular chert is often dark in color. It can have a white weathering rind that is known in archaeology as cortex.

Most chert nodules have textures suggesting they were formed by diagenetic replacement, where silica was deposited in place of calcium carbonate or clay minerals. This may have taken place where meteoric water (water derived from snow or rain) mixed with saltwater in the sediment beds, where carbon dioxide was trapped, producing an environment supersaturated with silica and undersaturated with calcium carbonate. Nodular chert is particularly common in continental shelf environments. In the Permian Basin (North America), chert nodules and chertified fossils are abundant in basin limestones, but there is little in the carbonate buildup zone itself. This may reflect dissolution of opal where carbonate is being actively deposited, a lack of siliceous organisms in these environments, or removal of siliceous skeletons by strong currents that redeposit the siliceous material in the deep basin.

The silica in nodular chert likely precipitates as opal-A, based on internal banding in nodules, and may recrystallize directly to microquartz without first recrystallizing to opal-CT. Some nodular chert may precipitate directly as microquartz, due to low levels of supersaturation of silica.

=== Other occurrences ===
The banded iron formations of Precambrian age are composed of alternating layers of chert and iron oxides.

Nonmarine cherts may form in saline alkaline lakes as thin lenses or nodules showing sedimentary structures suggestive of evaporite origin. Such cherts are forming today in the alkaline lakes of the East African Rift Valley. These lakes are characterized by sodium carbonate brines with very high pH that can contain as much as 2700 ppm silica. Episodes of runoff of fresh water into the lakes lowers the pH and precipitates the unusual sodium silicate minerals magadiite or kenyaite, After burial and diagenesis, these are altered to Magadi-type chert. The Morrison Formation contains Magadi-type chert that may have formed in the alkaline Lake T'oo'dichi'.

Chert may also form from replacement of calcrete in fossil soils (paleosols) by silica dissolved from overlying volcanic ash beds.

== Fossils ==
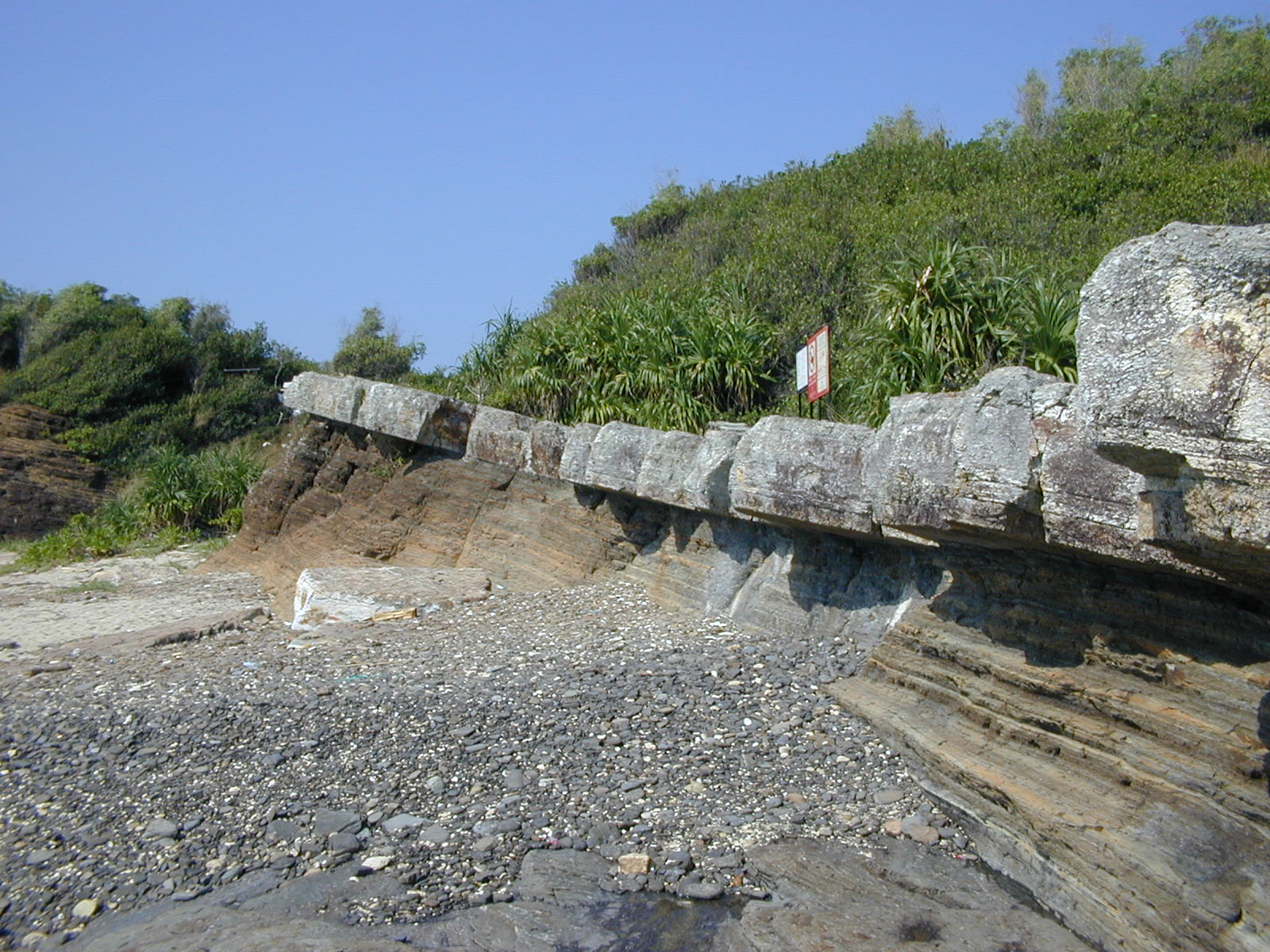
An erosion resistant layer of chert in the Eocene Ping Chau Formation, Hong Kong

The cryptocrystalline nature of chert, combined with its above average ability to resist weathering, recrystallization and metamorphism has made it an ideal rock for preservation of early life forms.

For example:

- The Apex Chert (3.4 Ga) of the Pilbara craton, Australia preserved eleven taxa of prokaryotes. However, these findings have been disputed.
- The 3.2 Ga chert of the Fig Tree Formation in the Barberton Mountains between Eswatini and South Africa preserved non-colonial unicellular bacteria-like fossils.
- The Gunflint Chert of western Ontario (1.9 to 2.3 Ga) preserves not only bacteria and cyanobacteria but also organisms believed to be ammonia-consuming and some that resemble green algae and fungus-like organisms.
- The Bitter Springs Formation of the Amadeus Basin, Central Australia, preserves 850 Ma cyanobacteria and algae.
- The Rhynie chert (410 Ma) of Scotland has remains of a Devonian land flora and fauna with preservation so perfect that it allows cellular studies of the fossils.

== Prehistoric and historic uses ==
Chert is of only modest economic importance today as a source of silica (quartz being much more abundant in sand). However, chert deposits may be associated with valuable deposits of iron, uranium, manganese, phosphorite, and petroleum.

=== Tools ===
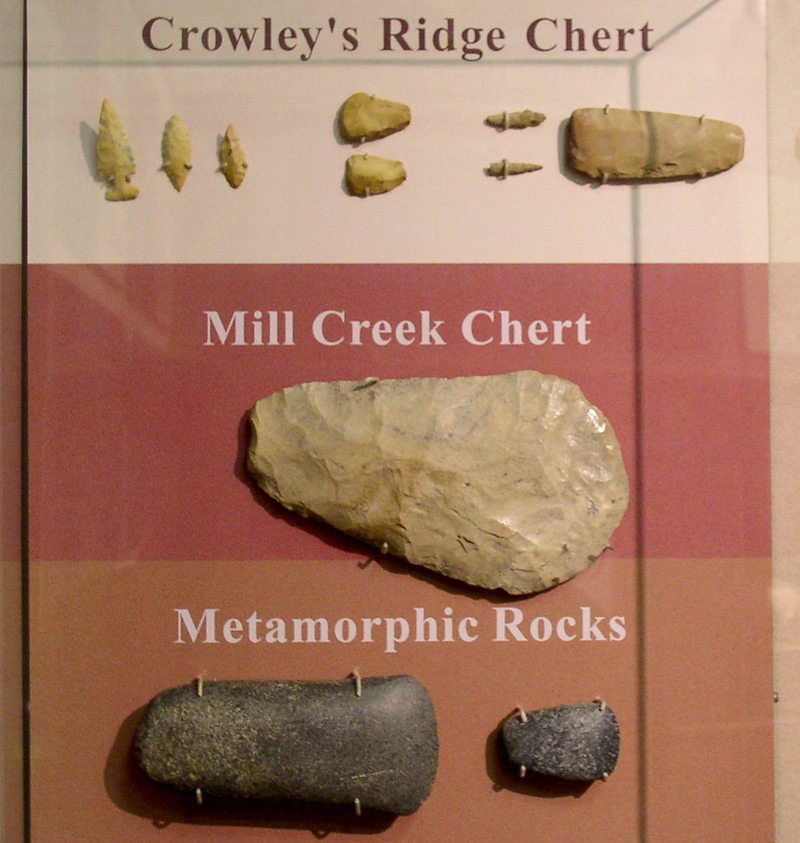
Mill Creek chert from the Parkin Site in Arkansas

In prehistoric times, chert was often used as a raw material for the construction of stone tools. Like obsidian, as well as some rhyolites, felsites, quartzites, and other tool stones used in lithic reduction, chert fractures in a Hertzian cone when struck with sufficient force. This results in conchoidal fractures, a characteristic of all minerals with no cleavage planes. In this kind of fracture, a cone of force propagates through the material from the point of impact, eventually removing a full or partial cone, as when plate glass is struck by a small hard projectile. The partial Hertzian cones produced during lithic reduction are called flakes, and exhibit features characteristic of this sort of breakage, including striking platforms, bulbs of force, and occasionally eraillures, which are small secondary flakes detached from the flake's bulb of force.

When a chert stone is struck against an iron-bearing surface, sparks result. This makes chert an excellent tool for starting fires, and both flint and common chert were used in various types of fire-starting tools, such as tinderboxes, throughout history. A primary historic use of common chert and flint was for flintlock firearms, in which the chert striking a metal plate produces a spark that ignites a small reservoir containing black powder, discharging the firearm.

=== Construction ===
Cherts can cause several problems when used as concrete aggregates. Deeply weathered chert develops surface pop-outs when used in concrete that undergoes freezing and thawing because of its high porosity.

A second concern is that certain cherts undergo an alkali-silica reaction with high-alkali cements. This reaction leads to cracking and expansion of concrete and ultimately to failure of the material.

== Varieties ==
There are numerous varieties of chert, which are classified by their visible, microscopic and physical characteristics. Examples are:

- Flint is a compact microcrystalline quartz. It was originally the name for chert found in chalk or marly limestone formations formed by a replacement of calcium carbonate with silica. Commonly found as nodules, this variety was often used in past times to make bladed tools. Today, some geologists refer to any dark gray to black chert as flint. The dark color is from inclusions of organic matter. Among non-geologists, the distinction between "flint" and "chert" is often one of quality – chert being lower quality than flint. This usage of the terminology is particularly prevalent in Great Britain where most true flint (found in chalk formations) was of better quality than "common chert" (from limestone formations).
- "Common chert" is a variety of chert which forms in limestone formations by replacement of calcium carbonate with silica. This is the most abundantly found variety of chert. It is generally considered to be less attractive for producing gem stones and bladed tools than flint.
- Jasper is a variety of chert formed as primary deposits, found in or in connection with magmatic formations, and owes its typical red color to hematite inclusions. Jasper frequently also occurs in black, yellow and green, depending on the type of iron it contains. Jasper is usually opaque to near opaque. Jasper is also present in banded iron formation, where it is described as jaspilite.
- Radiolarite is a variety of chert formed as primary deposits and containing radiolarian microfossils. Many show evidence of a deep-water origin, but some appear to have formed in water as shallow as 200 meters (660 ft).
- Chalcedony is a microfibrous quartz.
- Agate is distinctly banded chalcedony with successive layers differing in color or value.
- Onyx is a banded agate with layers in parallel lines, often black and white (sardonyx).
- Magadi-type chert is a variety that forms from a sodium silicate precursor in highly alkaline lakes such as Lake Magadi in Kenya.
- Novaculite is a very dense, fine-grained, and uniform form of very pure white chert with a high content of extracrystalline water. It is most common in the mid-Paleozoic rocks of Texas, Oklahoma, and Arkansas in the south-central United States, where it has undergone some metamorphism.
- Porcelanite is a term used for fine-grained siliceous rocks with a texture and a fracture resembling those of unglazed porcelain. It likely forms in shallow water and is composed mostly of opal-CT.
- Tripolitic chert (or tripoli) is a light-colored porous friable siliceous (largely chalcedonic) sedimentary rock, which results from the weathering (decalcification) of chert or siliceous limestone.
- Siliceous sinter is porous, low-density, light-colored siliceous rock deposited by waters of hot springs and geysers.
- Mozarkite a varicolored, easily polished Ordovician chert that takes a high polish. It is the state rock of Missouri.

Other lesser used archaic terms for chert are firestone and silex.

== See also ==
- Petrology – Study of rocks in geology
  - Eolith – Knapped flint nodule
  - Nodule (geology) – Small mass of a mineral with a contrasting composition to the enclosing sediment or rock not to be confused with Concretion
  - Obsidian – Naturally occurring volcanic glass
  - Opal – Hydrated amorphous form of silica
  - Whinstone – Quarrying term for any hard dark-coloured rock
- Archaeology – Study of human activity based on materials left behind
  - Clovis points, archaeological artefacts of the Clovis culture in New Mexico
  - Piatra Tomii – Late Jurassic limestone outcrop, a prehistoric chert mine in Alba County, Romania
  - Tranchet axe
