= Hertzian =

Hertzian may refer to:

- Hertzian antenna
- Hertzian cone, the cone produced when an object passes through a solid, such as a bullet through glass
- Hertzian contact stress, localized stresses that develop as two curved surfaces come in contact and deform slightly under imposed loads
- Hertzian dipole, defined as a finite oscillating current over an infinitesimal length at a specified position
- Hertzian wave, the original name of radio waves
- Hertzian wave telegraphy
