= Ground stone =

Prehistoric stone tool

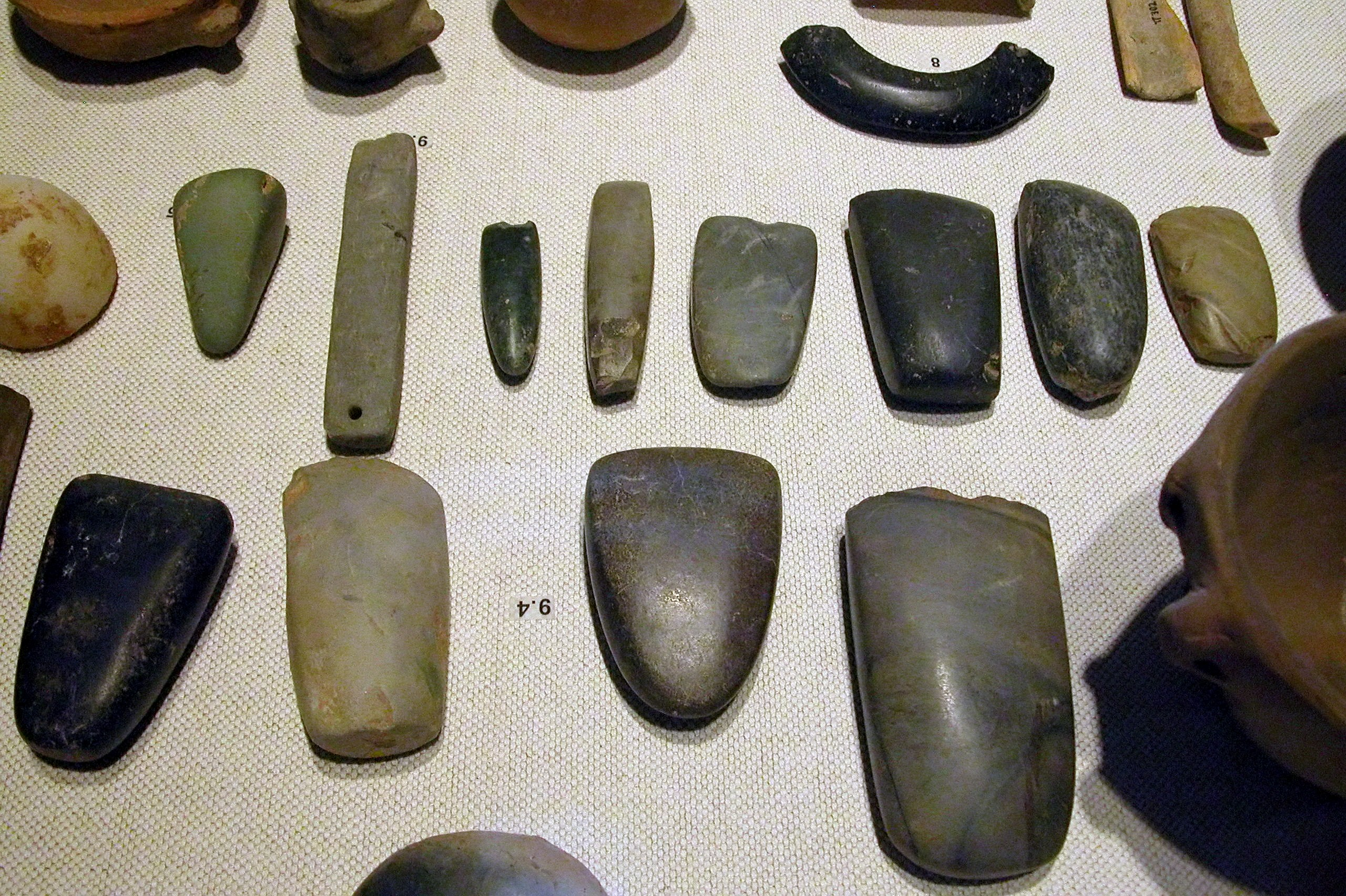
An array of Neolithic artifacts, including bracelets, axe heads, chisels, and polishing tools. Neolithic stone implements are by definition ground stone and, except for specialty items, not chipped.

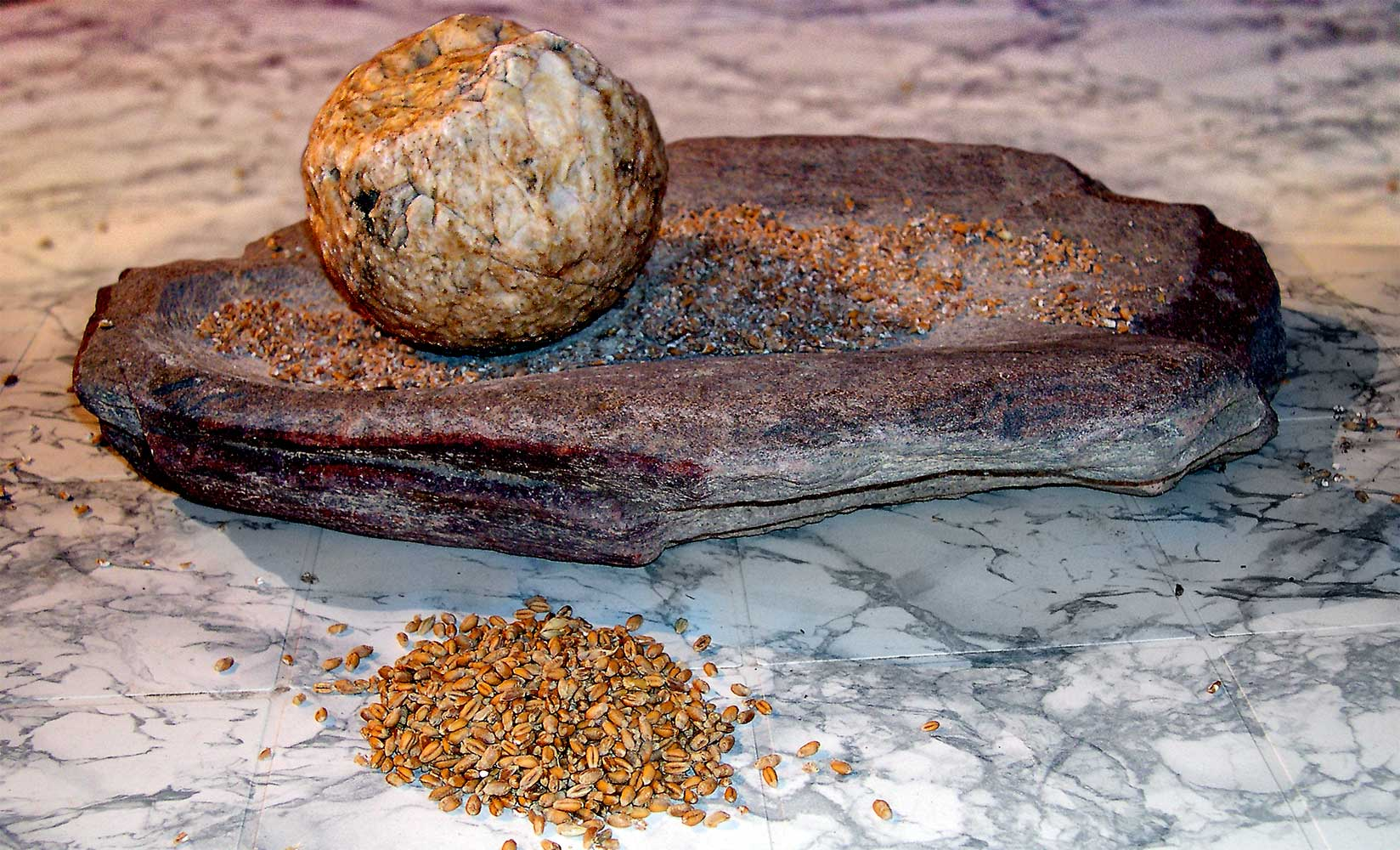
A Neolithic ground stone.

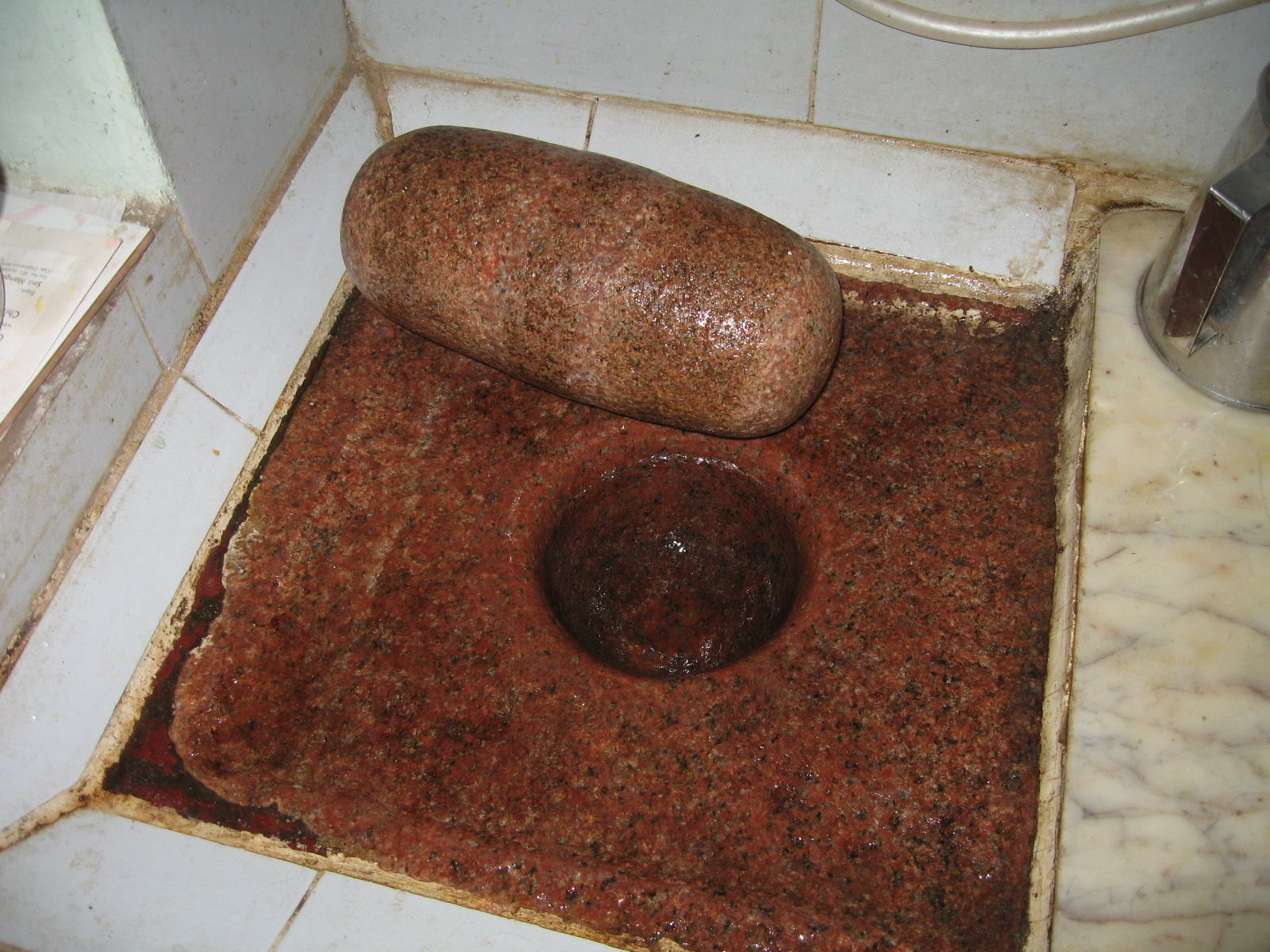
Traditional grinding stone used for making chutney, dosa batter and idli batter, in India today.

In archaeology, ground stone is a category of stone tool formed by the grinding of a coarse-grained tool stone, either purposely or incidentally. Ground stone tools are usually made of basalt, rhyolite, granite, or other cryptocrystalline and igneous stones whose coarse structure makes them ideal for grinding other materials, including plants and other stones.

Organic and inorganic materials are processed on ground stones into edible products. They are sometimes the only artefacts preserved on archaeological sites and are found worldwide.

== Origin ==
The adoption of ground stone technology is associated closely with the Neolithic, also called the New Stone Age. The Stone Age comes from the three-age system developed by Christian Jürgensen Thomsen. In the Levant ground stones appear in Mesolithic 2 (Natufian). In prehistoric Japan, ground stone tools appear during the Japanese Paleolithic, possibly predating adoption elsewhere in the Neolithic by 25,000 years.

== Creation ==
Ground stones were created and used for a wide variety of reasons. Each use resulted in a different development and process by which a person created their ground stone. For example, the process for creating the head of a hammer is different from the process used to create a detailed decoration piece for one’s home. That being said, some processes are basic to most ground stone making.

When choosing what type of stone to use for a ground stone tool, toughness is the most important factor. If the stone is not tough enough to withstand hard hits and instead just flakes and cracks easily, the work done to create the tool has gone to waste. A stone that will not shear, flake, or crack when tested against large impacts is the most important aspect when choosing what kind of stone to use. Examples of this kind of stone include limestone, sandstone, granite, basalt, rhyolite and other igneous and cryptocrystalline rocks.

Cryptocrystalline rocks are good to use for ground stones because they have a very fine grain structure. This is helpful because the smaller the grains are in a rock, the harder the rock is.

Holes could be ground out of stones with the use of sharp pointed stones or hardened sticks. By spinning the ground stone with one's hands and applying substantial pressure to the sharp point into the ground stone, a hole could be drilled into the stone with a large amount of time and effort. Sand would be used to help quicken the process by putting it in the partially formed hole as the sharp point was being pressed. The sand would help grind more of the stone away. To put a hole all the way through a piece of stone, it would be first drilled half way in one direction and be finished on the opposite side.

Some ground stone tools are incidental, caused by use with other tools: manos, for example, are hand stones used in conjunction with metates and other grinding slabs (querns), and develop their ground surfaces through wear. Other ground stone tools include adzes, celts, and axes, which are manufactured using a labor-intensive, time-consuming method of repeated grinding against a harder stone or with sand, often using water as a lubricant. These tools are often made using durable finer-grained materials rather than coarse materials. In the North American arctic, tools made of ground slate were used by the Norton, Dorset, and Thule tool cultures, among others. Common forms of these tools were projectile points and ulus. These tools were often purpose-made by creating a blank, either by chipping or using a technique where the slate was sawed partway through on one or both sides and then snapped into a blank, then finished by grinding with abraders or whetstones.

== Uses ==
When making the head of an axe out of stone, the piece would be made so it could be hafted. In order to have the stone hafted onto a larger piece, like wood or bone, the ground stone may have at least two notches ground out of one side of the stone, making grooves for the hafting material to lie inside. These grooves would ensure that the stone would not move when struck with a large force. Tough hide would then be wound around the handle and inside the grooves, binding the ground stone and the handle together.

Ground stones were often used as dinnerware. Using large stones, lithic reduction would be done for long periods of time to create bowls and pots for food. Jewelry, beads, ear spools and other decorative ground stones were a sign of high status due to the time and effort needed to make pieces of such small size and detail.

When mashing up seeds and leaves into powders, rounded and smooth ground stones would be used inside a stone bowl. This pair of tools is called a mortar and pestle. The material would be placed into the mortar and the pestle would be moved and pressed into the mortar to grind the material into a fine powder. This process could be used for medicine and cooking. The mortar and pestle are still used today for many cooking recipes.

Once shaped into an active (making the action, e.g. handstones) or passive (receiving the action, e.g. slab) tool, the stone is used to process a large range of products. At the end of its life, the stone can be recycled - either reused as a ground stone, used as a construction stone, or discarded

== Analytical methods ==
In archaeology, ground stones are studied to document past activities, agriculture strategies and the process of domestication. Ground stones technology was identified as daily life technology associated with cereals processing. However, their study has shown that they are more complex to understand and have multi-function. Ethnographic studies are essential to define the research question but are not enough to correctly determine the function of ground stones. Typology, ethnographic studies and experimental replicas help understand groundstone technologies. Typical methods are used to analyse them: the trace of wear and the analysis of botanical residues (starch grains and phytoliths).

=== Use-wear analysis ===
This technique analyses the trace of wear left by the types of actions (pounding, grinding, cutting). The trace of wear is specific to the action but also the type of product (organic or inorganic) process. Handstones for cereals and hide processing were distinguished using this method.

=== Botanical remains ===
Starch grains and phytoliths are botanical remains which are well preserved in archaeological context and are small enough to be trapped in the micro-crevice of a ground stone. Analyzing the botanical remains is essential to precise the function of the stones. A standardized protocol is used to study plant remains. First, there are extracts from the ground stones, using a toothbrush and an ultrasonic bath. Then, the residues are observed under a polarised microscope. And finish, starch are compared to a reference collection of experimental modern starch grains.

== See also ==
- Stone tool
- Lithic reduction
- Microlith
- Household Stone tools in Karnataka
