= Lithic reduction =

Process of fashioning stones or rocks into tools and weapons

The Levallois technique of flint-knapping

In archaeology, in particular of the Stone Age, lithic reduction is the process of fashioning stones or rocks from their natural state into tools or weapons by removing some parts. It has been intensely studied and many archaeological industries are identified almost entirely by the lithic analysis of the precise style of their tools and the chaîne opératoire of the reduction techniques they used.

Normally the starting point is the selection of a piece of tool stone that has been detached by natural geological processes, and is an appropriate size and shape. In some cases solid rock or larger boulders may be quarried and broken into suitable smaller pieces, and in others the starting point may be a piece of the debitage, a flake removed from a previous operation to make a larger tool. The selected piece is called the lithic core (also known as the "objective piece"). Flaked (or "knapped") stone is distinct from ground stone, objects made by grinding. Flaked stone reduction involves the use of a hard hammer percussor, such as a hammerstone, a soft hammer fabricator (made of wood, bone or antler), or a wood or antler punch to detach lithic flakes from the lithic core. As flakes are detached in sequence, the original mass of stone is reduced; hence the term for this process. Lithic reduction may be performed in order to obtain sharp flakes, of which a variety of tools can be made, or to rough out a blank for later refinement into a projectile point, knife, or other object. Flakes of regular size that are at least twice as long as they are broad are called blades. Lithic tools produced this way may be bifacial (exhibiting flaking on both sides) or unifacial (exhibiting flaking on one side only).

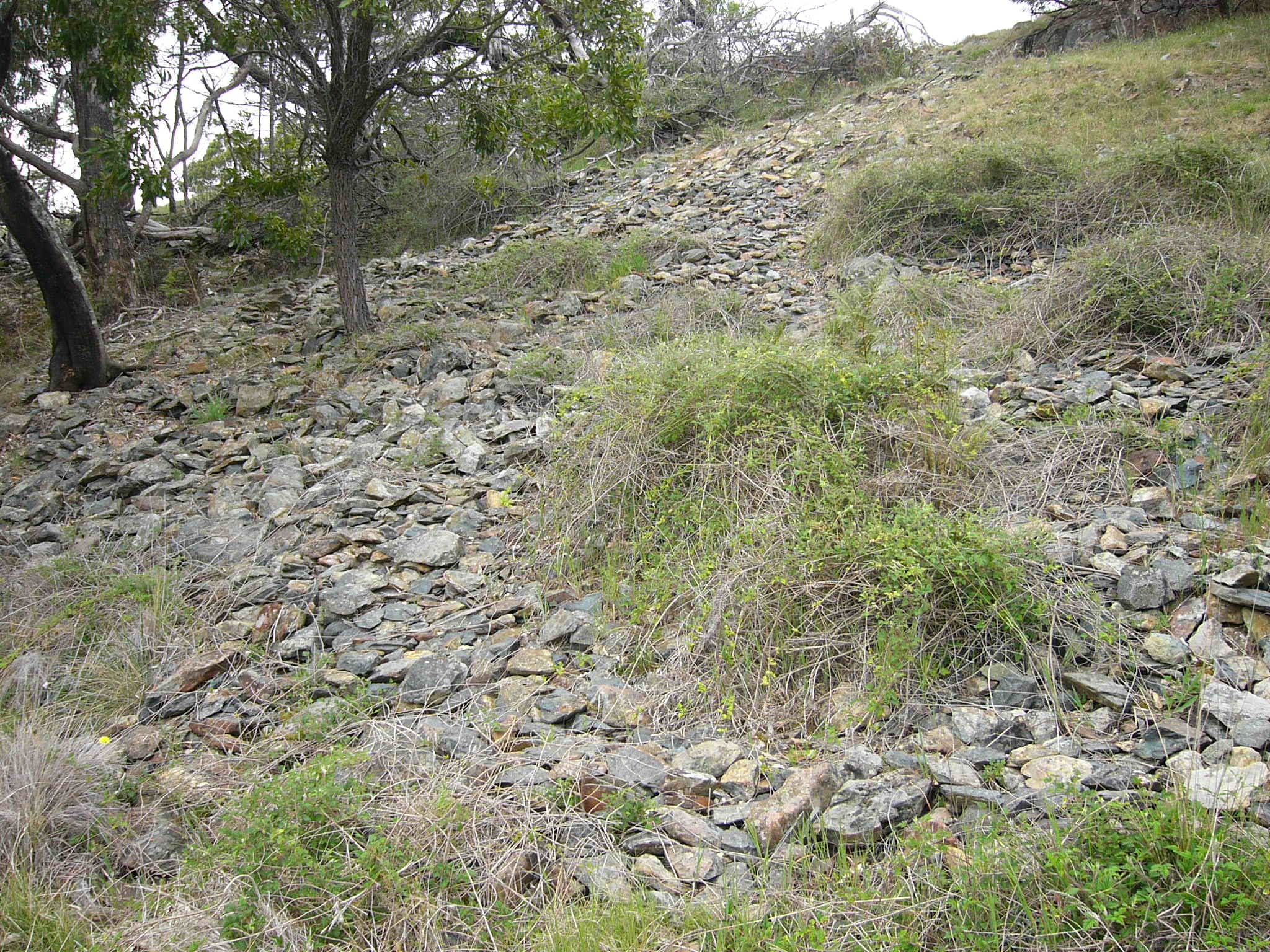
Mount William stone axe quarry in Australia

Cryptocrystalline or amorphous stone such as chert, flint, obsidian, and chalcedony, as well as other fine-grained stone material, such as rhyolite, felsite, and quartzite, were used as a source material for producing stone tools. As these materials lack natural planes of separation, conchoidal fractures occur when they are struck with sufficient force; for these stones this process is called knapping. The propagation of force through the material takes the form of a Hertzian cone that originates from the point of impact and results in the separation of material from the objective piece, usually in the form of a partial cone, commonly known as a lithic flake. This process is predictable, and allows the flintknapper to control and direct the application of force so as to shape the material being worked. Controlled experiments may be performed using glass cores and consistent applied force in order to determine how varying factors affect core reduction.

It has been shown that stages in the lithic reduction sequence may be misleading and that a better way to assess the data is by looking at it as a continuum. The assumptions that archaeologists sometimes make regarding the reduction sequence based on the placement of a flake into a stage can be unfounded. For example, a significant amount of cortex can be present on a flake taken off near the very end of the reduction sequence. Removed flakes exhibit features characteristic of conchoidal fracturing, including striking platforms, bulbs of force, and occasionally eraillures (small secondary flakes detached from the flake's bulb of force). Flakes are often quite sharp, with distal edges only a few molecules thick when they have a feather termination. These flakes can be used directly as tools or modified into other utilitarian implements, such as spokeshaves and scrapers.

== Reduction index ==
By understanding the complex processes of lithic reduction, archaeologists recognize that the pattern and amount of reduction contribute tremendous effect to lithic assemblage compositions. One of the measurements is the geometric index of reduction. There are two elements in this index: 't' and 'T'. The 'T' is the 'height' of maximum blank thickness and the 't' is the height of retouched scar from the ventral surface. The ratio between t and T is the geometric index of reduction. In theory this ratio shall range between 0 and 1. The bigger the number is the larger amount of lost weight from lithic flake. By using a logarithmic scale, a linear relationship between the geometric index and the percentage of original flake weight lost through retouch is confirmed. In choosing a reduction index, it is important to understand the strengths and weaknesses of each method, and how they fit to the intended research question, as different indices provide different levels of information. For example, Kuhn's geometric index of unifacial reduction (GIUR), which describes the ratio of scar height relative to the flake thickness, is highly influenced by the morphology of the flake blank which limits the applicability of this reduction index.

Since 2025 the Original Scraper Mass Calculator is available. The application uses the remaining mass of the scraper, the maximum thickness of the scraper blank, the average height of the retouch (Kuhn's "t"), and Kuhn's GIUR as variables to estimate the original mass of a scraper. The variables were combined in a random forest in order to provide high accuracy predictions (with an average error of 3.2 g).

== Techniques ==
=== Heating ===
Alongside the various percussion and manipulation techniques described below, there is evidence that heat was at least sometimes used. Experimental archaeology has demonstrated that heated stones are sometimes much easier to flake, with larger flakes being produced in flint, for example. In some cases the heating changes the colour of the stone.

From the Channel Islands (California) there are cases where native americans heat up chert to make the process of chipping the tools more malleable. The heating process also gives the tools a luster that could be distinguished between non heat treated tools.

=== Percussion reduction ===
Percussion reduction, or percussion flaking, refers to removal of flakes by impact.

The methods used are:

- Hitting hand-held core with a hammer or percussor
- Bipolar percussion or bipolar technique, using anvil and striking implement
- Projectile percussion: the objective stone is thrown at an anvil
- Indirect percussion: flake struck from core by using a punch

==== Hand-held core ====
Generally, a core or other objective piece, such as a partially formed tool, is held in one hand, and struck with a hammer or percussor. Percussors are traditionally either a stone cobble or pebble, often referred to as a hammerstone, or a billet made of bone, antler, or wood.

==== Bipolar percussion ====
When the objective piece is placed on a stationary anvil-stone and the flake is detached by using a striking implement, the method is known as bipolar percussion or bipolar technique. The resulting flake presents a double bulb of percussion, one at each end; alternatively, especially in the case of a quartz flake, there would be crushing at each end.

In bipolar percussion the objective piece of toolstone is placed on an anvil stone, and then the percussion force is applied to the tool stone. Like projectile percussion, the tool stone is likely to shatter, rather than producing a single flake. Unlike projectile percussion, the technique has some degree of control to it. Bipolar percussion is not popular with hobbyists, but there is evidence that bipolar percussion was the preferred way of dealing with certain problems. Bipolar percussion has the benefit of producing many sharp flakes, and triangular pieces of stone which can be useful as drills. Bipolar percussion also does not require the manufacturer to locate a platform before setting to work, and bipolar percussion can produce sharp flakes almost the size of the original piece of tool stone. The lack of control makes bipolar percussion undesirable in many situations, but the benefits mean that it often has a use, especially if workable material is rare. Bipolar percussion is often used to break open small cobbles, or to have a second chance with spent lithic cores, broken bifaces, and tools that have been reworked so much that it is impossible to make further useful tools using traditional lithic reduction. The end result of bipolar percussion is often a big mess, with only a few pieces that can be useful as cores or flakes for further working, but if other methods would result in a total dead-end, bipolar percussion may be desirable.

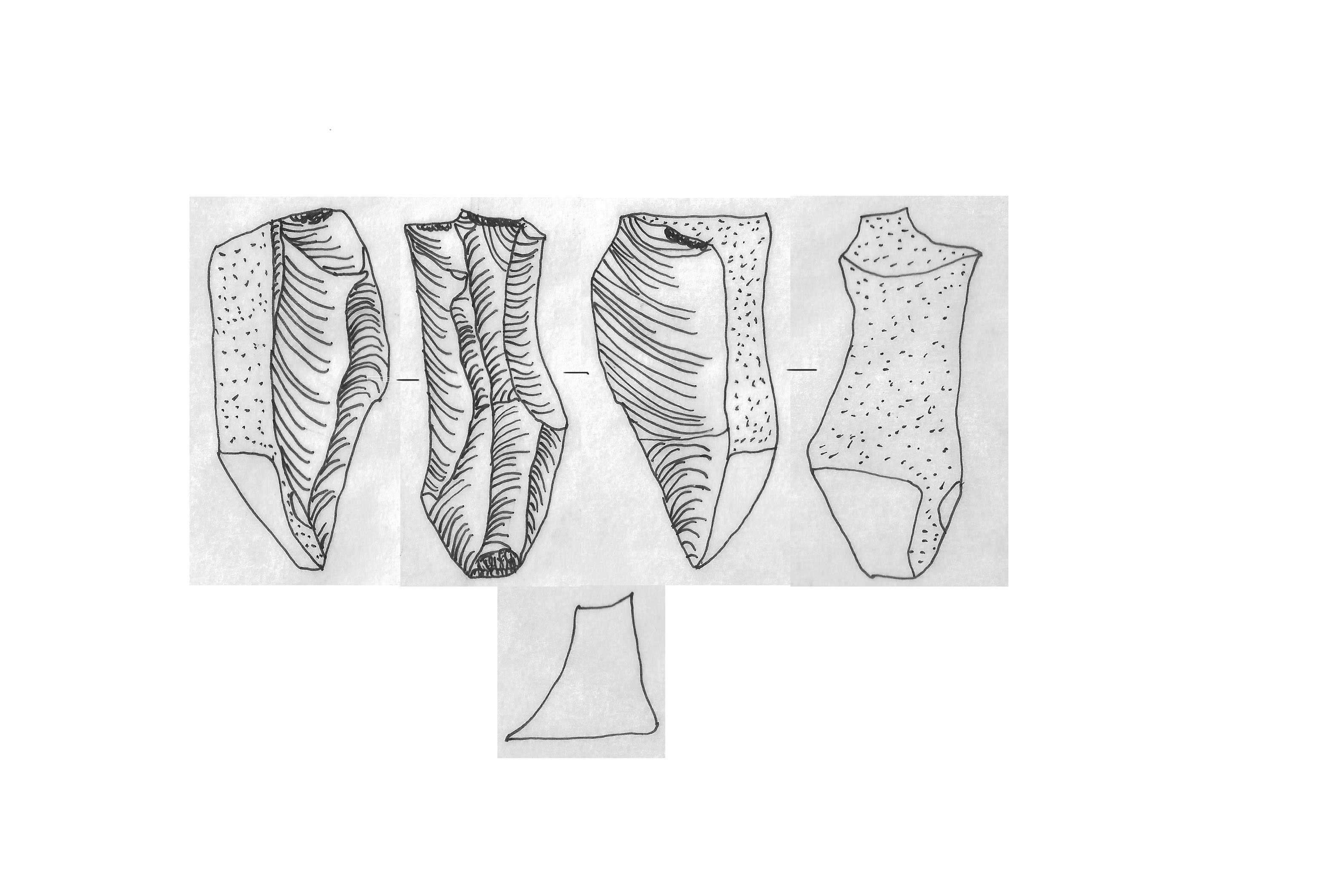
An example of an obsidian core that has had flakes removed using bipolar percussion.

An alternative view of the bipolar reduction technique is offered by Jan Willem Van der Drift which contradicts the suggestion that there is little control over fracturing. The characteristics of bipolar reduction are different from that occurring in conchoidal fracture and are therefore often misinterpreted by archaeologists and lithic experts.

==== Hard-hammer percussion ====
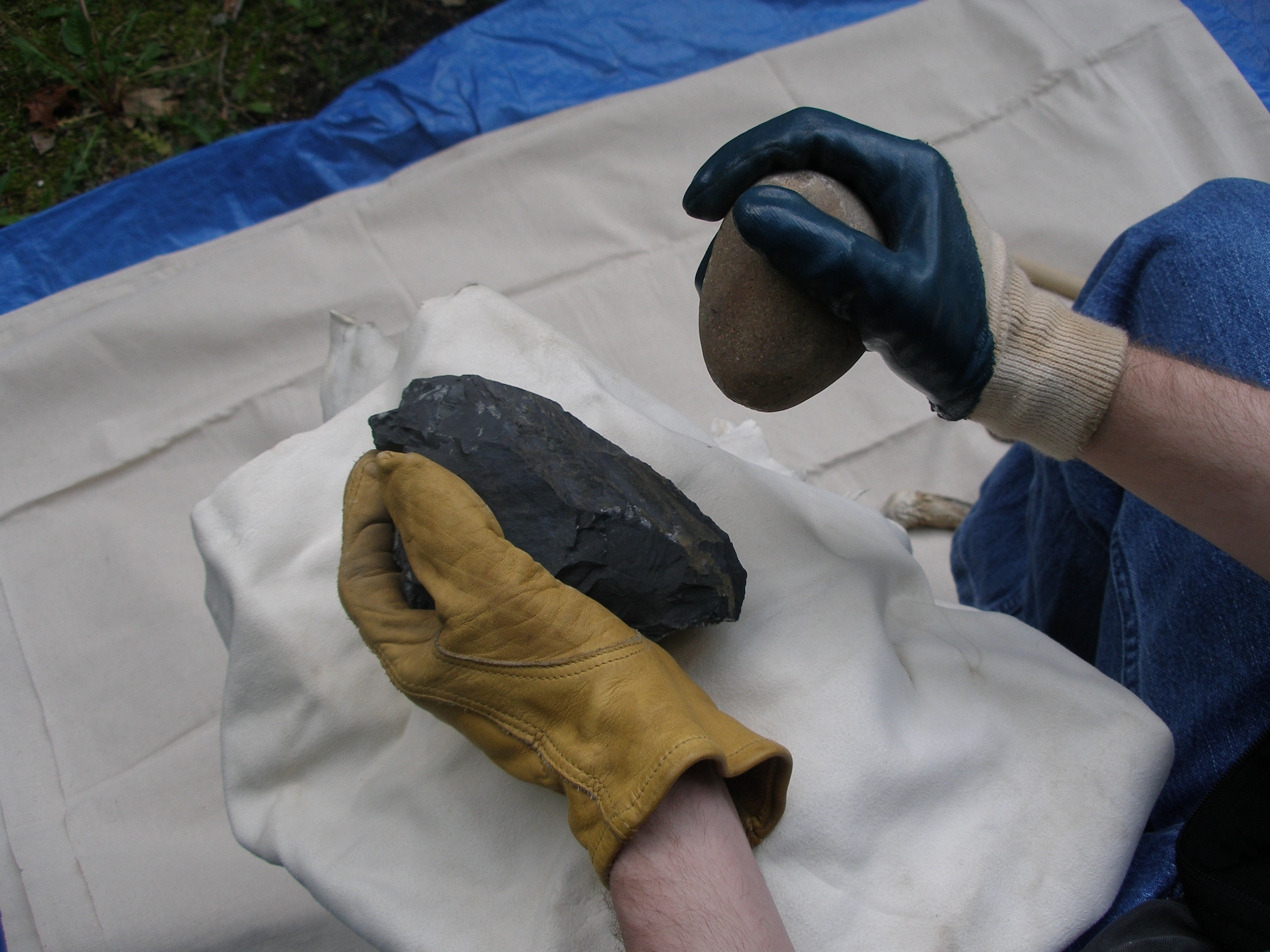
An example of hard hammer percussion.

Hard hammer techniques are generally used to remove large flakes of stone. Early flintknappers and hobbyists replicating their methods often use cobbles of very hard stone, such as quartzite. This technique can be used by flintknappers to remove broad flakes that can be made into smaller tools. This method of manufacture is believed to have been used to make some of the earliest stone tools ever found, some of which date from over 2 million years ago.

It is the use of hard-hammer percussion that most often results in the formation of the typical features of conchoidal fracture on the detached flake, such as the bulb of percussion and compression rings.

==== Soft-hammer percussion ====
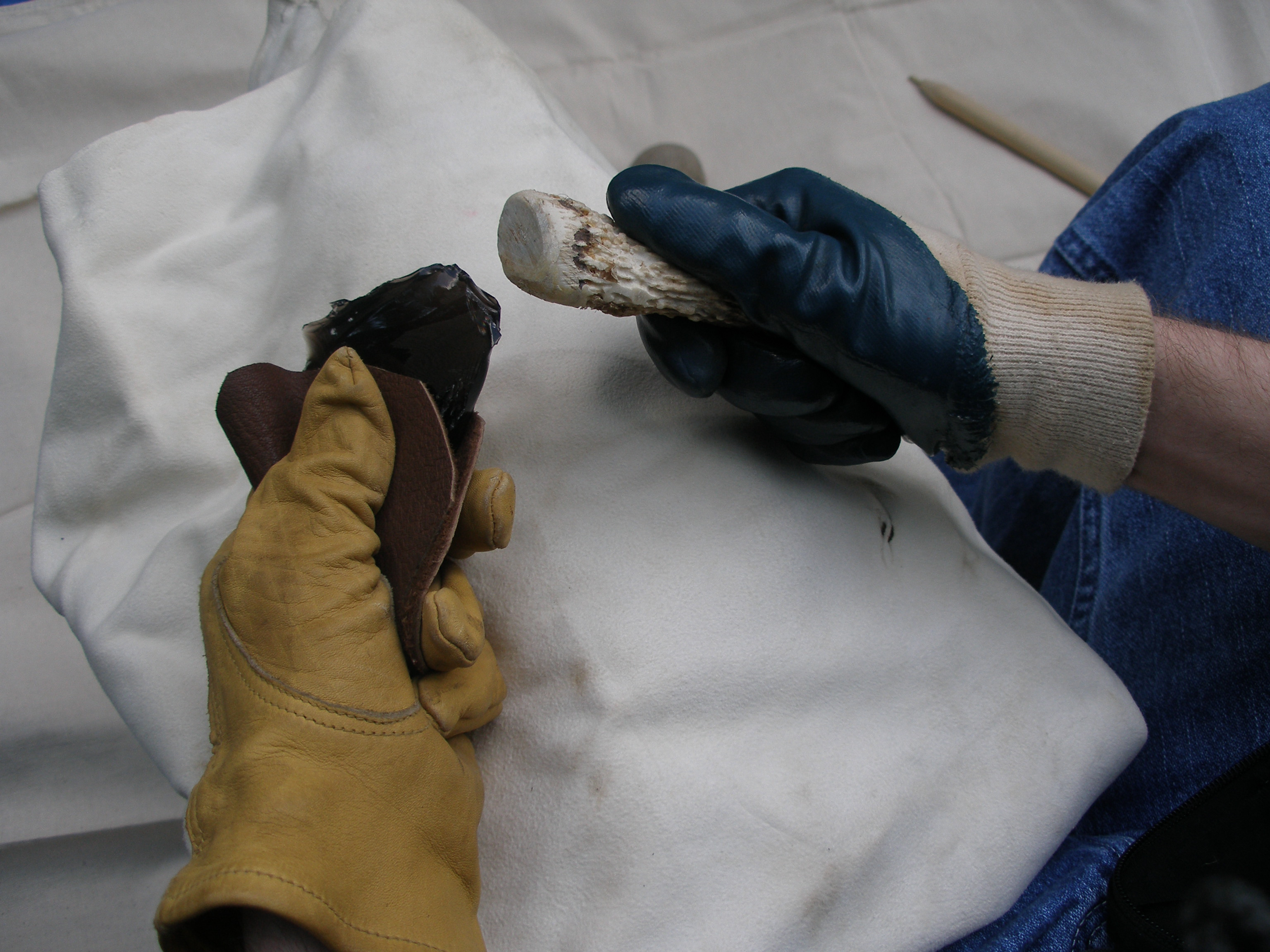
An example of soft hammer percussion

Soft-hammer percussion involves the use of a billet, usually made of wood, bone or antler as the percussor. These softer materials are easier to shape than stone hammers, and therefore can be made into more precise tools. Soft hammers also deform around the sharp edges of worked stone, rather than shattering through them, making it desirable for working tool stone that already has been worked to some degree before. Soft hammers of course also do not have as much force behind them as hard hammers do. Flakes produced by soft hammers are generally smaller and thinner than those produced by hard-hammer flaking; thus, soft-hammer flaking is often used after hard-hammer flaking in a lithic reduction sequence to do finer work. As well as this, soft-hammers can produce longer flakes which aid in the conservation of materials because they produce a longer cutting edge per unit of mass lost.

In most cases, the amount of pressure applied to the objective piece in soft-hammer percussion is not enough for the formation of a typical conchoidal fracture. Rather, soft-hammer flakes are most often produced by what is referred to as a bending fracture, so-called because the flake is quite literally bent or "peeled" from the objective piece. A bending fracture can be produced with a hard hammer. Flakes removed in this manner lack a bulb of percussion, and are distinguished instead by the presence of a small lip where the flake's striking platform has separated from the objective piece.

==== Projectile percussion ====
Percussion can also be done by throwing the objective piece at an anvil stone. This is sometimes called projectile percussion.

Projectile percussion is so basic as to not be considered a technique. It involves throwing the toolstone at a stationary anvil stone. This method provides virtually no control over how the toolstone will fragment, and therefore produces a great deal of shatter, and few flakes. It is difficult to be sure whether or not this method of lithic reduction was ever a commonplace practice, although noting sharp edges on a broken rock might have led early humans to first recognize the value of lithic reduction.

==== Indirect percussion ====
Often, flakes are struck from a core using a punch, in which case the percussor never actually makes contact with the objective piece. This technique is referred to as indirect percussion.

Indirect percussion involves the use of a punch and hammer. The punch and hammer make it possible to apply large force to very small areas of a stone tool. Indirect percussion is therefore often used to achieve detail work on smaller tools. Some modern hobbyists make use of indirect percussion almost exclusively, with little or no pressure flaking to finish their work.

Since indirect percussion can be so precisely placed, the platform is often much smaller on flakes produced in this way than in other methods of flake removal. Of course, indirect percussion requires two hands to hold the percussing tool set. One holds the hammer, and one holds the punch. Therefore, modern hobbyists must use a third object in order to hold the targeted piece of tool stone while they strike it. Often, some sort of clamp or vise is used. No evidence for such devices has yet been found in the archaeological record, but this is partly because they would normally be made of perishable materials, and partly because they can have great variation in design.

=== Pressure flaking ===
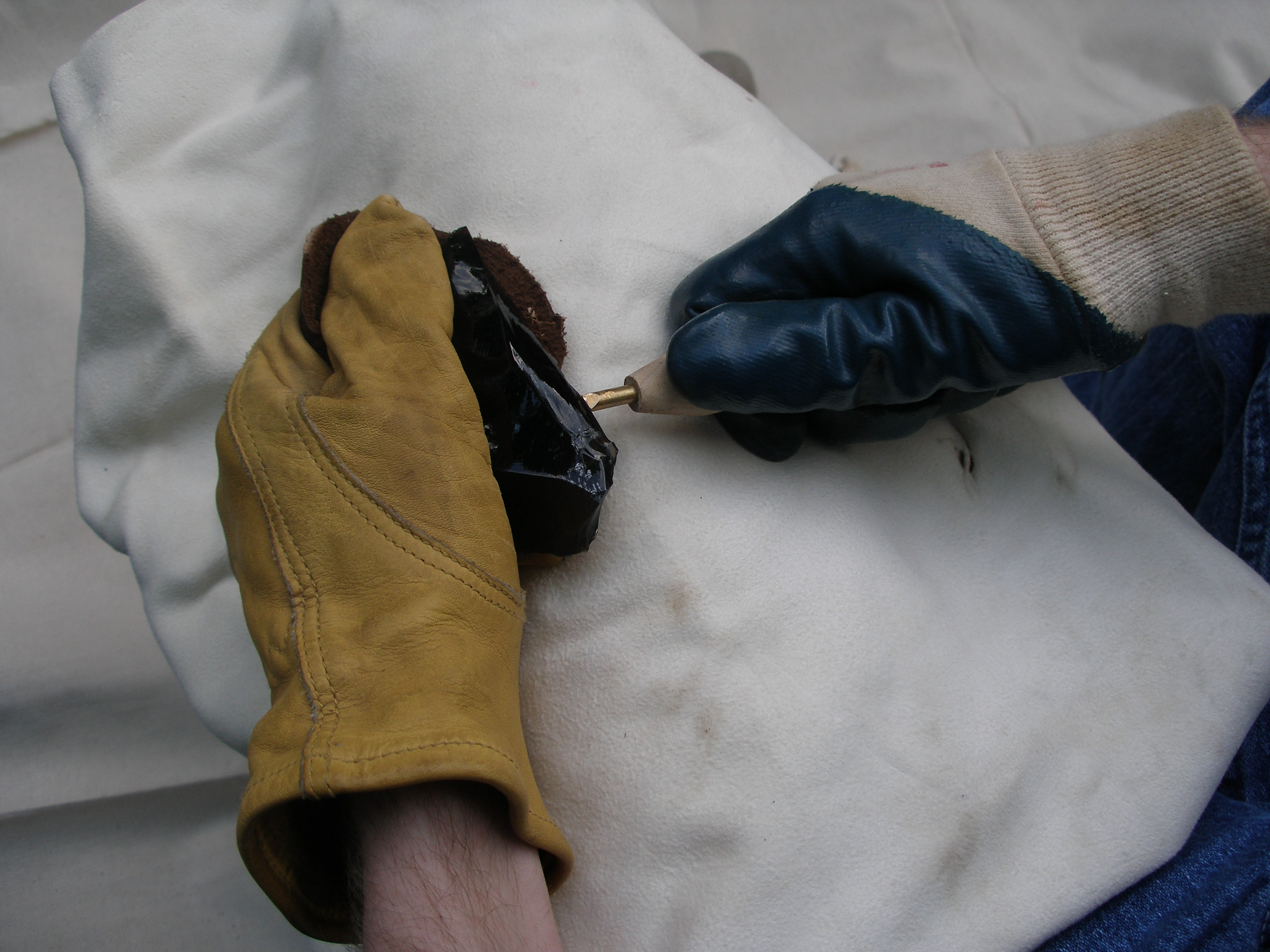
An example of pressure flaking

Pressure flaking is a method of trimming the edge of a stone tool by removing small lithic flakes by pressing on the stone with a sharp instrument rather than striking it with a percussor. This method, which often uses punches made from bone or antler tines (or, among modern hobbyists, copper punches or even nails), provides a greater means of controlling the direction and quantity of the applied force than when using even the most careful percussive flaking. Copper retoucheurs to facilitate this process were widely employed in the Early Bronze Age – and may therefore be associated with Beaker Culture in northwestern Europe.

Usually, the objective piece is held clasped in the flintknapper's hand, with a durable piece of fabric or leather protecting the flintknapper's palm from the sharpness of the flakes removed. The tip of the flaking tool is placed against the edge of the stone tool and pressed hard, removing a small linear or lunate flake from the opposite side. The process also involves frequent preparation of the edge to form better platforms for pressing off flakes. This is usually accomplished with abraiders made from a coarse-grained stone such as basalt or quartzite. Great care must be taken during pressure flaking so that perverse fractures that break the entire tool do not occur. Occasionally, outrepasse breaks occur when the force propagates across and through the tool in such a way that the entire opposite margin is removed.

The use of pressure flaking facilitated the early production of sharper and more finely detailed tools. Pressure flaking also gave toolmakers the ability to create notches where the objective piece could be bound more securely to the shaft of the weapon or tool and increasing the object's utility.

An archaeological discovery in 2010 in Blombos Cave, South Africa, places the use of pressure flaking by early humans to make stone tools back to 73,000 BCE, 55,000 years earlier than previously accepted. The previously accepted date, "no more than 20,000 years ago", was based upon the earliest evidence previously available, which derived from findings of the Upper Paleolithic Solutrean culture in France and Spain.

== Blanks and preforms ==
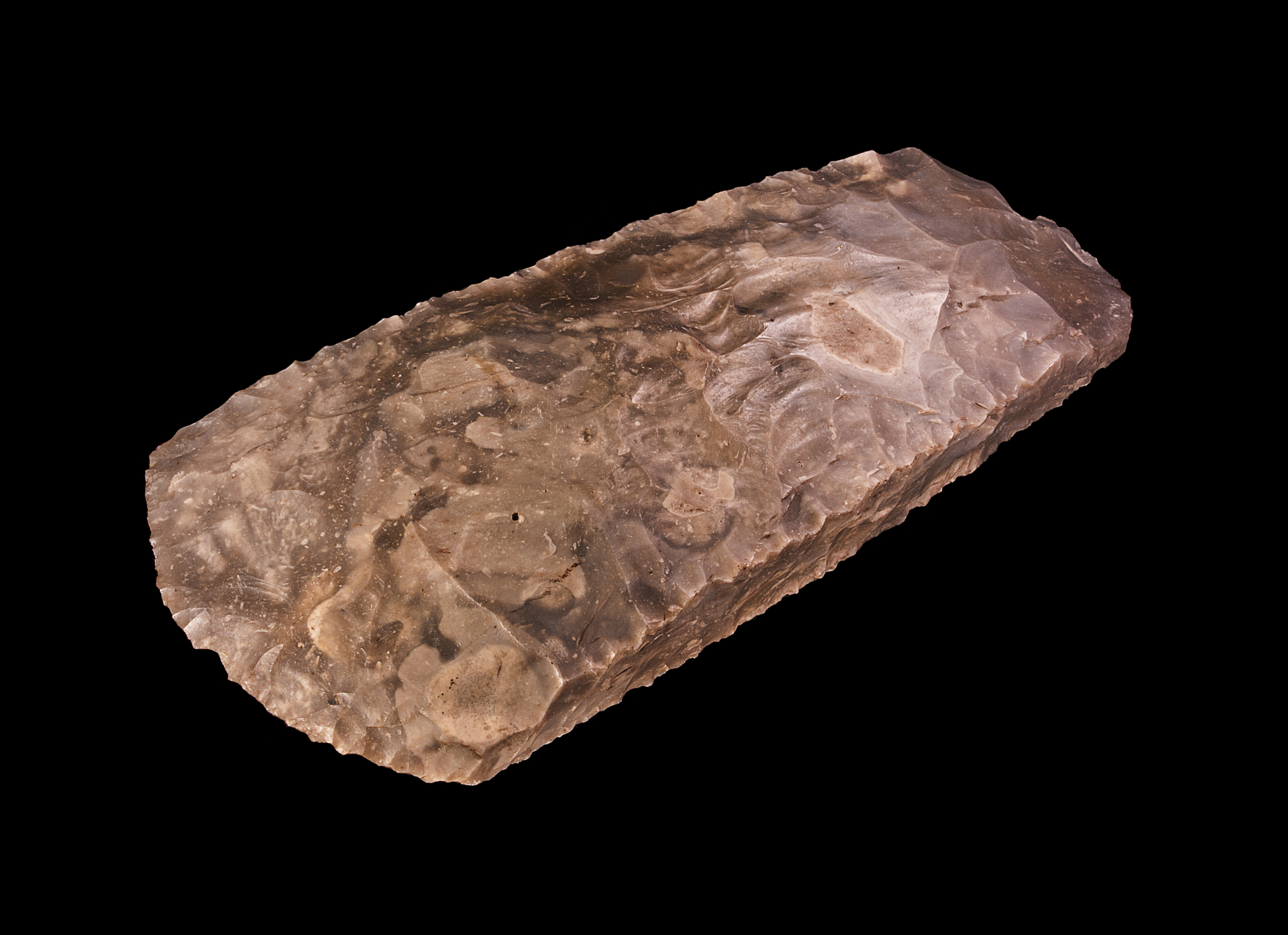
Upper Neolithic axe-head preform

A blank is a stone of suitable size and shape to be worked into a stone tool. Blanks are the starting point of a lithic reduction process, and during prehistoric times were often transported or traded for later refinement at another location. Blanks might be stones or cobbles, just as natural processes have left them, or might be quarried pieces, or flakes that are debitage from making another piece. Whatever their origin, on most definitions no further steps have yet been taken to shape them, or they become a preform.

The next stage creates a preform, or roughly shaped piece of stone, that probably reveals the final form of the tool, but is not complete. Preforms might also be transported or traded. Typically, a preform is the shaped remnant of a lithic core. Larger and thicker than the intended tool, it lacks the final trimming and refinement that is present in the completed artifact. Sometimes basic features such as stems and notches have been initiated. In most cases, the term refers to an incomplete projectile point.

== See also ==
- Eccentric flint (archaeology)
- Lithic technology
- Tranchet axe
