= Stone tool =

Stone tools have been used throughout human history but are most closely associated with prehistoric cultures and in particular those of the Stone Age. Stone tools may be made of either ground stone or knapped stone, the latter fashioned by a craftsman called a flintknapper. Stone has been used to make a wide variety of tools throughout history, including arrowheads, spearheads, hand axes, and querns. Knapped stone tools are nearly ubiquitous in pre-metal-using societies because they are easy to manufacture, the tool stone raw material is usually plentiful, and they are easy to transport and sharpen.

The study of stone tools is a cornerstone of prehistoric archaeology because stone tools are very resistant to natural degradation and therefore ubiquitous components of the archaeological record. Ethnoarchaeology is used to deepen understanding of, and to explore the cultural implications of, stone tool use and manufacture.

Knapped stone tools are made from cryptocrystalline materials such as chert, flint, radiolarite, chalcedony, obsidian, basalt, and quartzite via a splitting process known as lithic reduction. One simple form of reduction is to strike stone flakes from a lithic core of material using a hammerstone or similar hard hammer fabricator. If the goal is to produce flakes, the remnant core may be discarded once it is too small to continue producing flakes. In some strategies, however, a flintknapper makes a tool from the core by reducing it to a rough unifacial or bifacial preform, which is further reduced by using soft hammer flaking or by pressure flaking the edges. More complex forms of reduction may produce highly standardized blades, which can then be fashioned into a variety of tools such as scrapers, knives, sickles, and microliths.

== Evolution ==
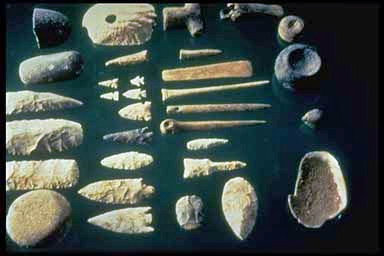
A selection of prehistoric stone tools

Archaeologists classify stone tools into industries (also known as complexes or technocomplexes) that share distinctive technological or morphological characteristics.

In 1969 in the 2nd edition of World Prehistory, Grahame Clark proposed an evolutionary progression of flint-knapping in which the "dominant lithic technologies" occurred in a fixed sequence from Mode 1 through Mode 5. He assigned to them relative dates: Modes 1 and 2 to the Lower Palaeolithic, 3 to the Middle Palaeolithic, 4 to the Upper Paleolithic, and 5 to the Mesolithic, though there were other lithic technologies outside these Modes. Each region had its own timeline for the succession of the Modes: for example, Mode 1 was in use in Europe long after it had been replaced by Mode 2 in Africa.

Clark's scheme was adopted enthusiastically by the archaeological community. One of its advantages was the simplicity of its terminology; for example, the Mode 1/Mode 2 Transition. The transitions are currently of greatest interest. Consequently, in the literature, the stone tools used during the Palaeolithic are divided into four "modes", each of which denotes a different level of complexity and, in most cases, follows a rough chronological order.

=== Pre-Mode I ===
Kenya

Stone tools found from 2011 to 2014 at the Lomekwi archeological site near Lake Turkana in Kenya are dated to 3.3 million years old and predate the genus Homo by about 1 million years. The oldest known Homo fossil is about 2.4–2.3 million years old compared to the 3.3 million year old stone tools. The stone tools may have been made by Australopithecus afarensis, the species whose best fossil example is Lucy, which inhabited East Africa at the same time as the date of the oldest stone tools, a yet unidentified species, or by Kenyanthropus platyops (a 3.2 to 3.5-million-year-old Pliocene hominin fossil discovered in 1999). Dating of the tools was done by dating volcanic ash layers in which the tools were found and dating the magnetic signature (pointing north or south due to reversal of the magnetic poles) of the rock at the site.

Ethiopia

Grooved, cut, and fractured animal bone fossils, made by using stone tools, were found in Dikika, Ethiopia, near (200 yards) the remains of Selam, a young Australopithecus afarensis girl who lived about 3.3 million years ago.

=== Mode I: The Oldowan Industry ===
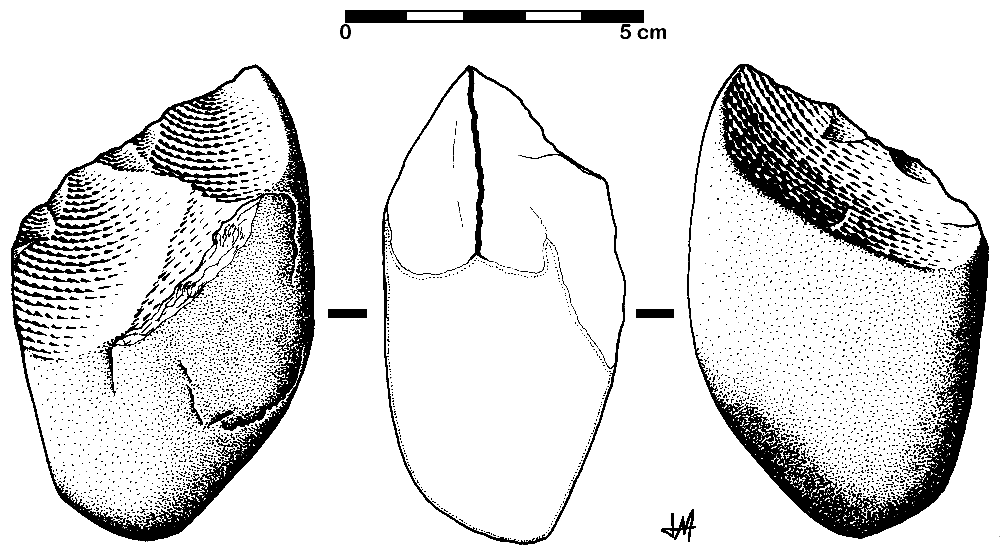
A typical Oldowan simple chopping-tool. This example is from the Duero Valley, Valladolid.

The earliest stone tools in the era of the genus Homo are Mode 1 tools, and come from what has been termed the Oldowan Industry, named after the type of site (many sites, actually) found in Olduvai Gorge, Tanzania, where they were discovered in large quantities. Oldowan tools were characterised by their simple construction, predominantly using core forms. These cores were river pebbles, or similar rocks, that had been struck by a spherical hammerstone, causing conchoidal fractures, removing flakes from one surface, creating an edge, and often a sharp tip. The blunt end is the proximal surface; the sharp end is the distal. Oldowan is a percussion technology. Grasping the proximal surface, the hominid brought the distal surface down hard on an object he wished to detach or shatter, such as a bone or tuber. Experiments with modern humans found that knapping-naive participants can invent all four Oldowan knapping techniques, and that the experiment participants used the resulting Oldowan tools to access a money-baited box.

The earliest known Oldowan tools have been found at Nyayanga on the Homa Peninsula in Kenya and are dated to ~2.9 million years ago (Ma), as well as from the Gona and Ledi-Geraru sites in Ethiopia, dated from around 2.6 million years ago, during the Lower Palaeolithic. After this date, the Oldowan Industry subsequently spread throughout much of Africa, although archaeologists are currently unsure which Hominan species first developed them, with some speculating that it was Australopithecus garhi, and others believing that it was in fact Homo habilis. Homo habilis was the hominin who used the tools for most of the Oldowan in Africa, but at about 1.9–1.8 million years ago Homo erectus inherited them. The industry flourished in southern and eastern Africa between 2.6 and 1.7 million years ago, but was also spread out of Africa and into Eurasia by travelling bands of H. erectus, who took it as far east as Java by 1.8 million years ago and Northern China by 1.6 million years ago.

=== Mode II: The Acheulean Industry ===
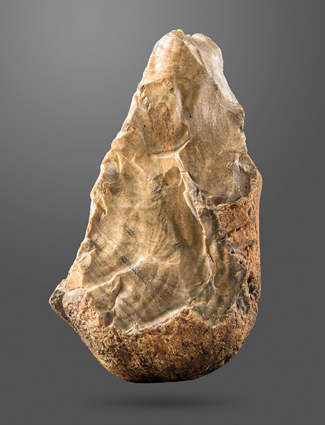
A biface (trihedral) from Amar Merdeg, Zagros foothills, Lower Paleolithic, National Museum of Iran

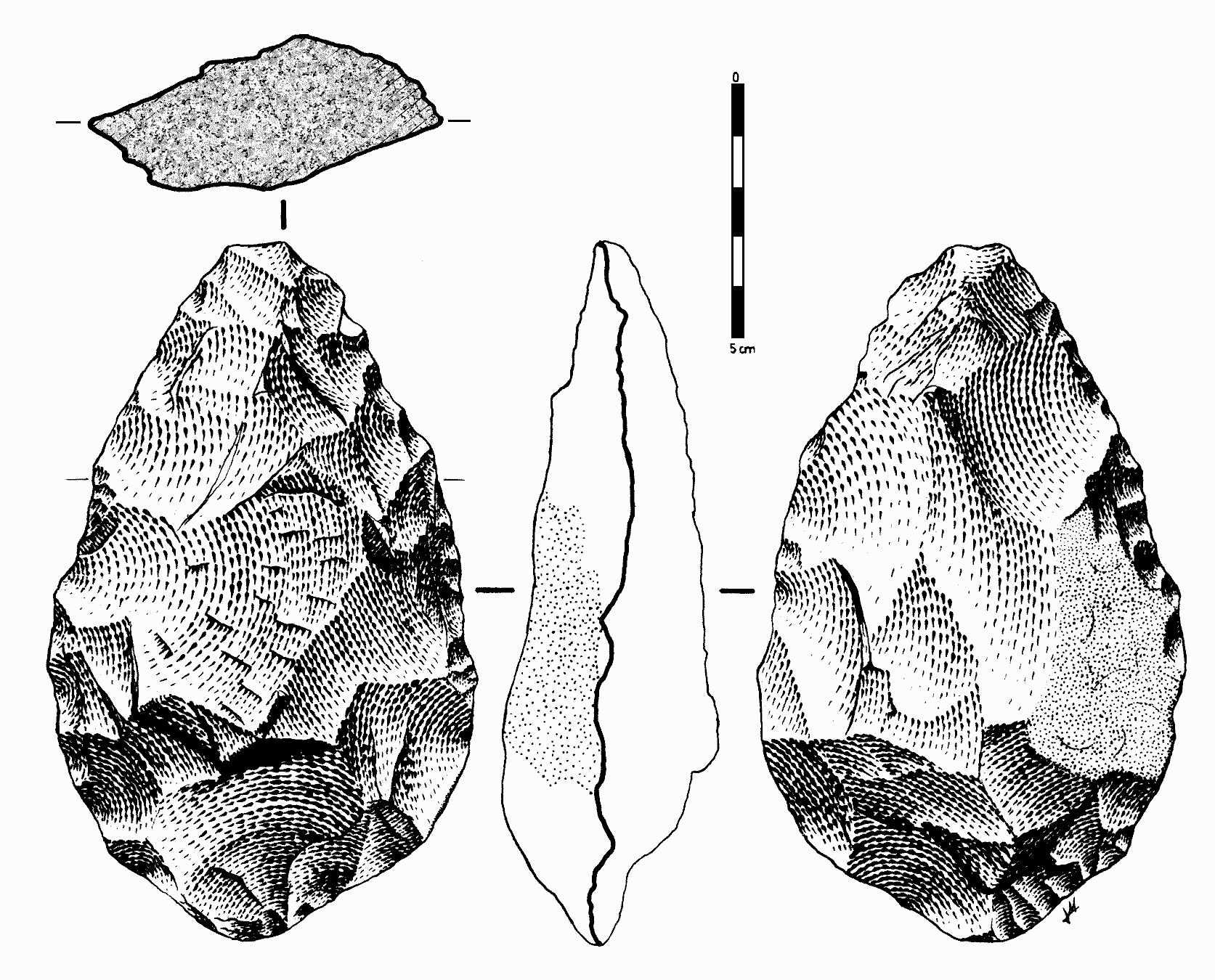
A typical Acheulean handaxe (from the Duero valley in Spain). The small flakes on the edge are from reworking.

Eventually, more complex Mode 2 tools were developed during the Acheulean Industry, named after the site of Saint-Acheul in France. The Acheulean was characterised not by the core, but by the biface, the most notable form of which was the hand axe. The Acheulean first appears in the archaeological record as early as 1.7 million years ago in the West Turkana area of Kenya and contemporaneously in southern Africa.

The Leakeys, excavators at Olduvai, defined a "Developed Oldowan" Period, during which they believed they found evidence of an overlap between Oldowan and Acheulean. In their species-specific view of the two industries, Oldowan equated to H. habilis and Acheulean to H. erectus. Developed Oldowan was assigned to habilis and Acheulean to erectus. Subsequent dates for H. erectus pushed the fossils back to well before the Acheulean; that is, H. erectus must have initially used Mode 1. There was no reason to think, therefore, that Developed Oldowan had to be habilis; it could have been erectus. Opponents of the view divide the Developed Oldowan between Oldowan and Acheulean. There is no question, however, that habilis and erectus coexisted, as habilis fossils have been found as late as 1.4 million years ago. Meanwhile, African H. erectus developed Mode 2. In any case, a wave of Mode 2 then spread across Eurasia, leading to its adoption there. H. erectus may not have been the only hominin to leave Africa; European fossils are sometimes associated with Homo ergaster, a contemporary of H. erectus in Africa.

In contrast to an Oldowan tool, which is the result of a fortuitous and probably unplanned operation to obtain one sharp edge on a stone, an Acheulean tool is a planned result of a manufacturing process. The manufacturer begins with a blank, either a larger stone or a slab knocked off a larger rock. From this blank, they remove large flakes to be used as cores. Standing on a core on an anvil stone, they strike the exposed edge with centripetal blows of a hard hammer to roughly shape the implement. Then the piece must be worked over again, or retouched, with a soft hammer of wood or bone to produce a tool finely knapped all over, consisting of two convex surfaces intersecting in a sharp edge. Such a tool is used for slicing; a concussion would destroy the edge and cut the hand.

Some Mode 2 tools are disk-shaped; others are ovoid; others are leaf-shaped and pointed; and others are elongated and pointed at the distal end, with a blunt proximal end, obviously used for drilling. Mode 2 tools are used for butchering; not being composite (having no haft) they are not very effective killing instruments. The killing must have been done some other way. Mode 2 tools are larger than Oldowan. The blank was ported to serve as an ongoing source of flakes until it was finally retouched into a finished tool. Edges were often sharpened by further retouching.

=== Mode III: The Mousterian Industry ===
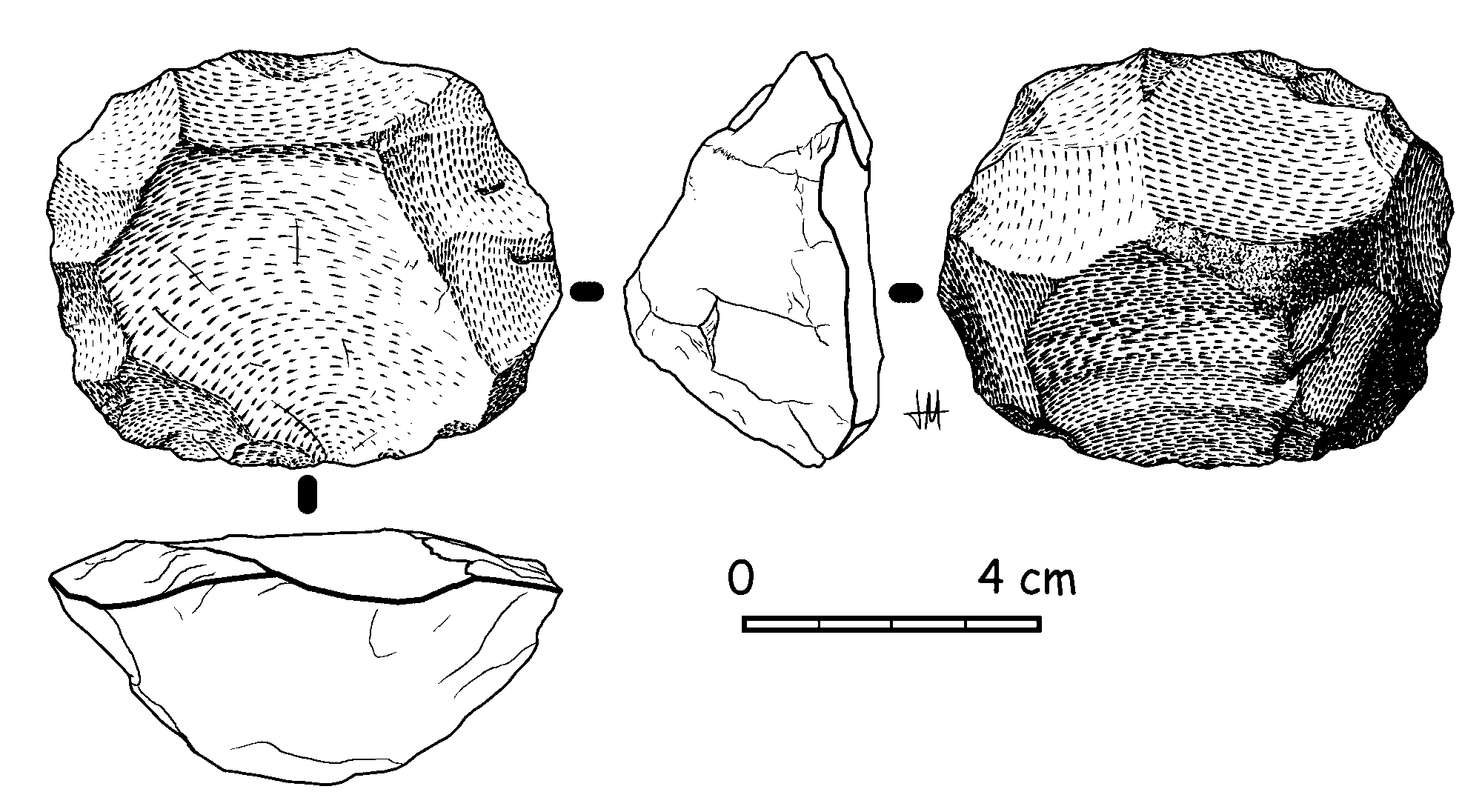
A tool made by the Levallois technique. This example is from La Parrilla (Valladolid, Spain).

Eventually, the Acheulean in Europe was replaced by a lithic technology known as the Mousterian Industry, which was named after the site of Le Moustier in France, where examples were first uncovered in the 1860s. Evolving from the Acheulean, it adopted the Levallois technique to produce smaller and sharper knife-like tools as well as scrapers. Also known as the "prepared core technique", flakes are struck from worked cores and then subsequently retouched. The Mousterian Industry was developed and used primarily by the Neanderthals, a native European and Middle Eastern hominin species, but a broadly similar industry is contemporaneously widespread in Africa.

=== Mode IV: The Aurignacian Industry ===
The widespread use of long blades (rather than flakes) of the Upper Palaeolithic Mode 4 industries appeared during the Upper Palaeolithic between 50,000 and 10,000 years ago, although blades were produced in small quantities much earlier by Neanderthals. The Aurignacian culture seems to have been the first to rely largely on blades. The use of blades exponentially increases the efficiency of core usage compared to the Levallois flake technique, which had a similar advantage over Acheulean technology, which was worked from cores.

==== Expansion to the New World ====
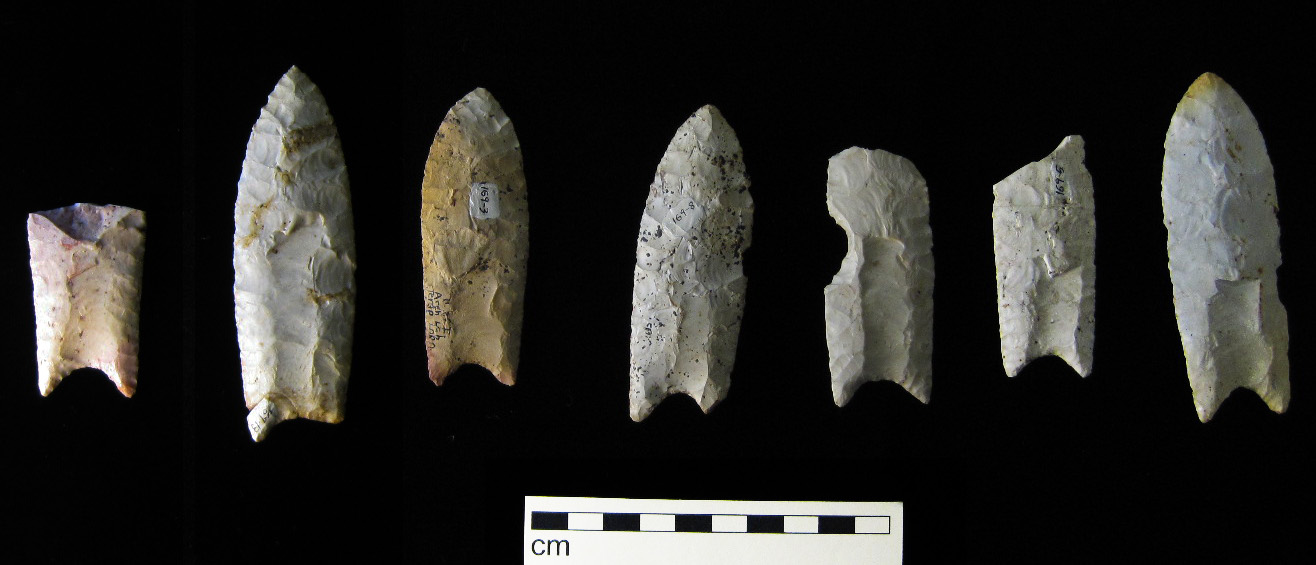
Clovis points from the Rummells-Maske Cache Site, Iowa

As humans spread to the Americas in the Late Pleistocene, Paleo-Indians brought with them stone tools related to those that evolved separately from Old World technologies. The Clovis point is the most widespread example of Late Pleistocene points in the Americas, dating to about 13,000 years ago.

One of the earliest cases of tool use comes from the Channel Islands (California), which were among the earliest places in North America to develop civilization. The tools found were drills, reamers, scrapers, abraders, spoke-shave, macroblade plane, burin, and wood-splitting wedges. These tools show that the people living there were skilled in woodworking.

Other tools found on the Channel Islands were crescent-shaped and heat-flaked.

In the San Francisco Bay Area acorns found were often associated with grinding tools. Acorns show diachronic changes in tribal life as the tools for processing them evolved. Mortar tools, such as millingstones and mortar and pestle, used to grind acorns, are dated to different periods at different locations.

Central America, or Mesoamerica, also has several unique stone-tool industries with their own specific cultural associations. One such industry is the Lowe industry, found in southern Mesoamerica near modern-day Belize. These tools are versatile biface points defined by their basal thinning and barbed cutting edges. Ancient Mesoamericans, not unlike other stone-tool users, used a combination of multitools and tools made for specific purposes, such as cutting, scraping, whittling, and the making of other stone tools.

One famous use of stone tools in Mesoamerica is the formidable Macuahuitl, the Aztec "sword" consisting of a flat board whose outside face is lined with microliths. These weapons appear in the archaeological record as well as in many primary source depictions, such as the Florentine Codex. Aztec warriors wielded these powerful weapons in war; however, they also held symbolic and political significance.

Stones and stone tools in Mesoamerica held great power beyond their practical uses. In ancestral Maya traditions, axes and scepters were powerful tools of magic, and were wielded by gods and monarchs alike. Materials such as obsidian and flint are directly associated with certain gods like Ītzpāpālōtl and play critical roles in powerful divining magic. Mirrors were tools of divination in Maya tradition, and were often made out of obsidian. Stone tools were also the medium through which human sacrifice and bloodletting were performed.

=== Mode V: The Microlithic Industries ===
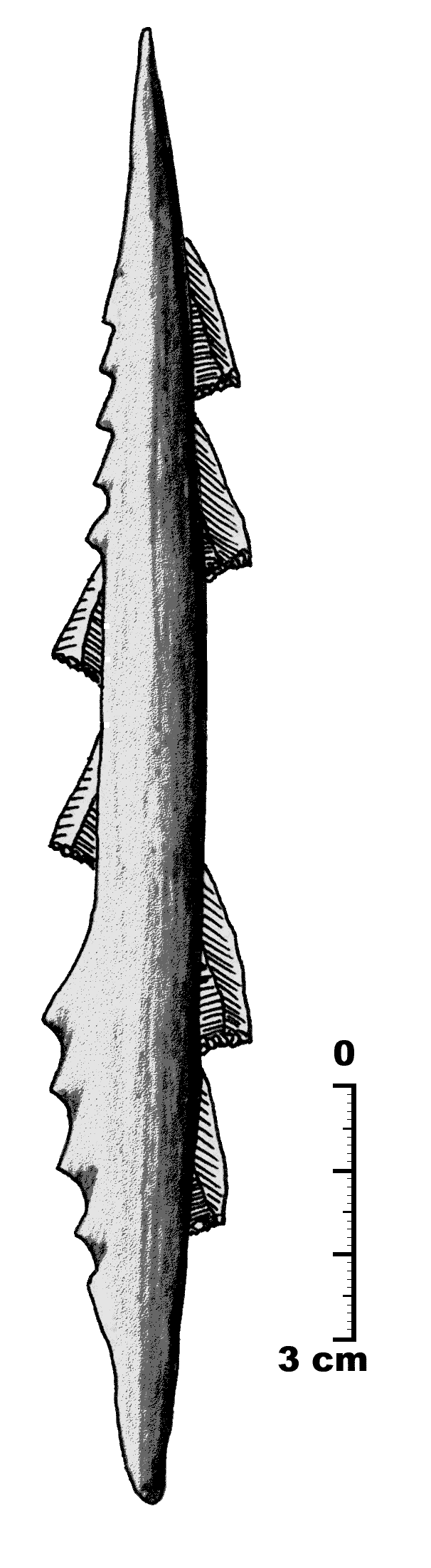
The most widely accepted hypothesis is that geometric microliths were used on projectiles such as this harpoon.

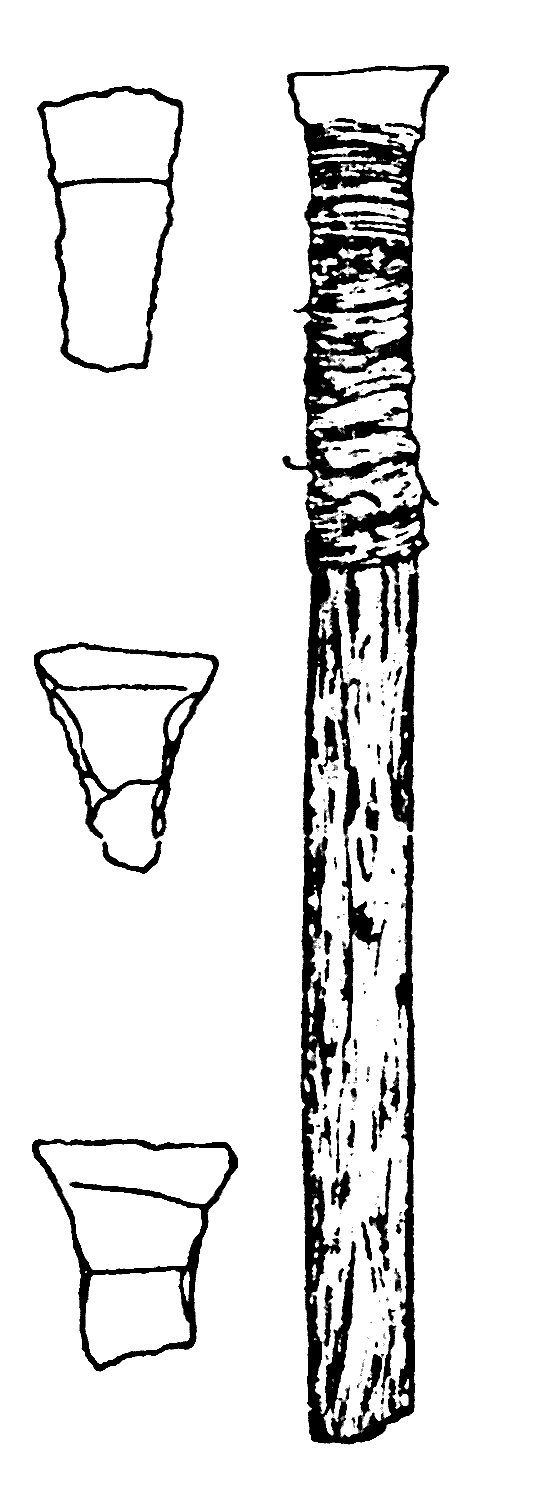
Trapezoid microliths and an arrow with a trapeze used to strengthen the tip, found in a peat bog at Tværmose (Denmark)

Mode 5 stone tools involve the production of microliths, which were used in composite tools, mainly fastened to a shaft. Examples include the Magdalenian culture. Such a technology makes much more efficient use of available materials like flint, although it requires greater skill in manufacturing the small flakes. Mounting sharp flint edges in a wooden or bone handle is the key innovation in microliths, essentially because the handle protects the user from the flint and improves the device's leverage.

=== Neolithic industries ===
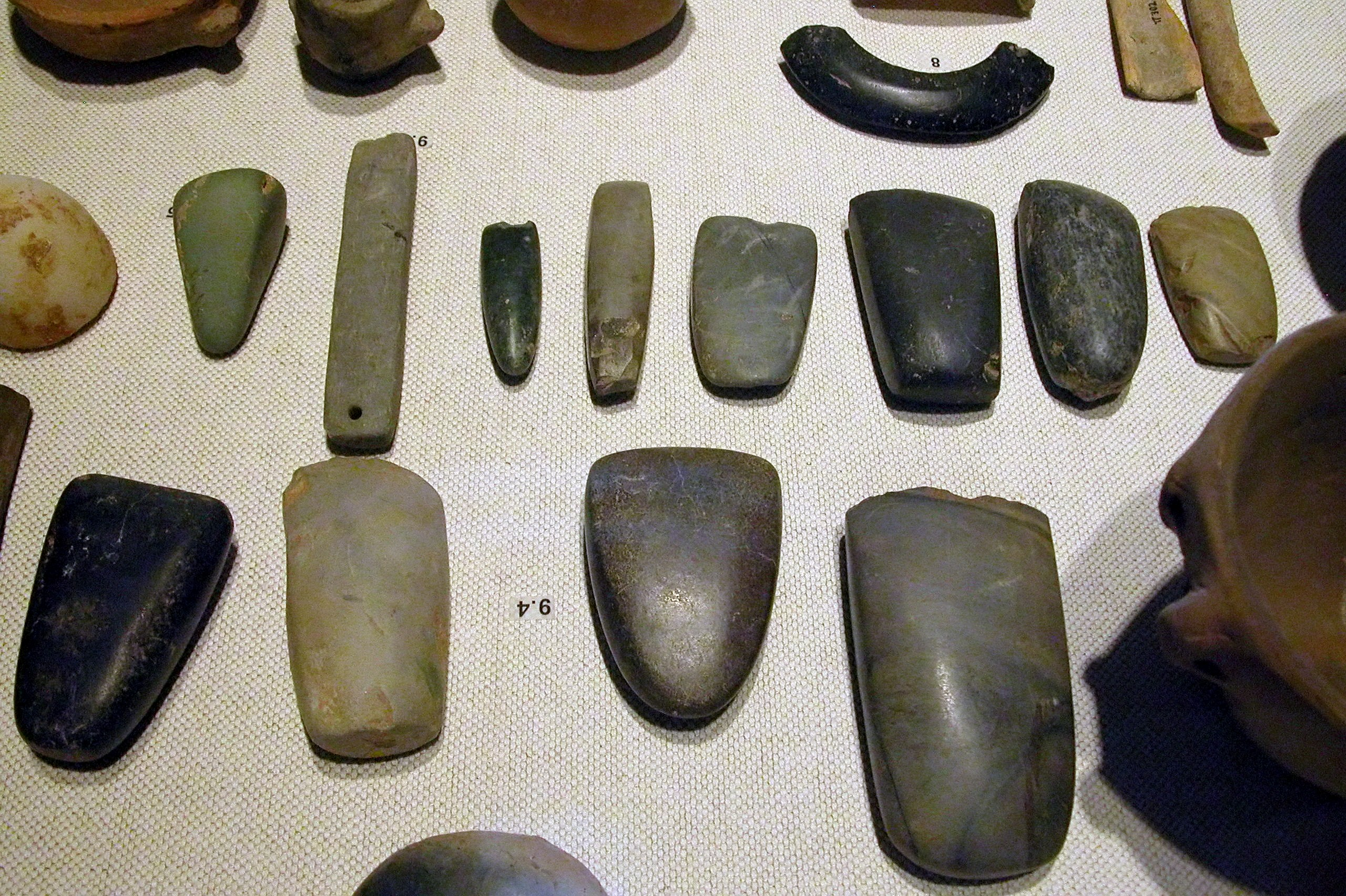
An array of Neolithic artifacts, including bracelets, axe heads, chisels, and polishing tools

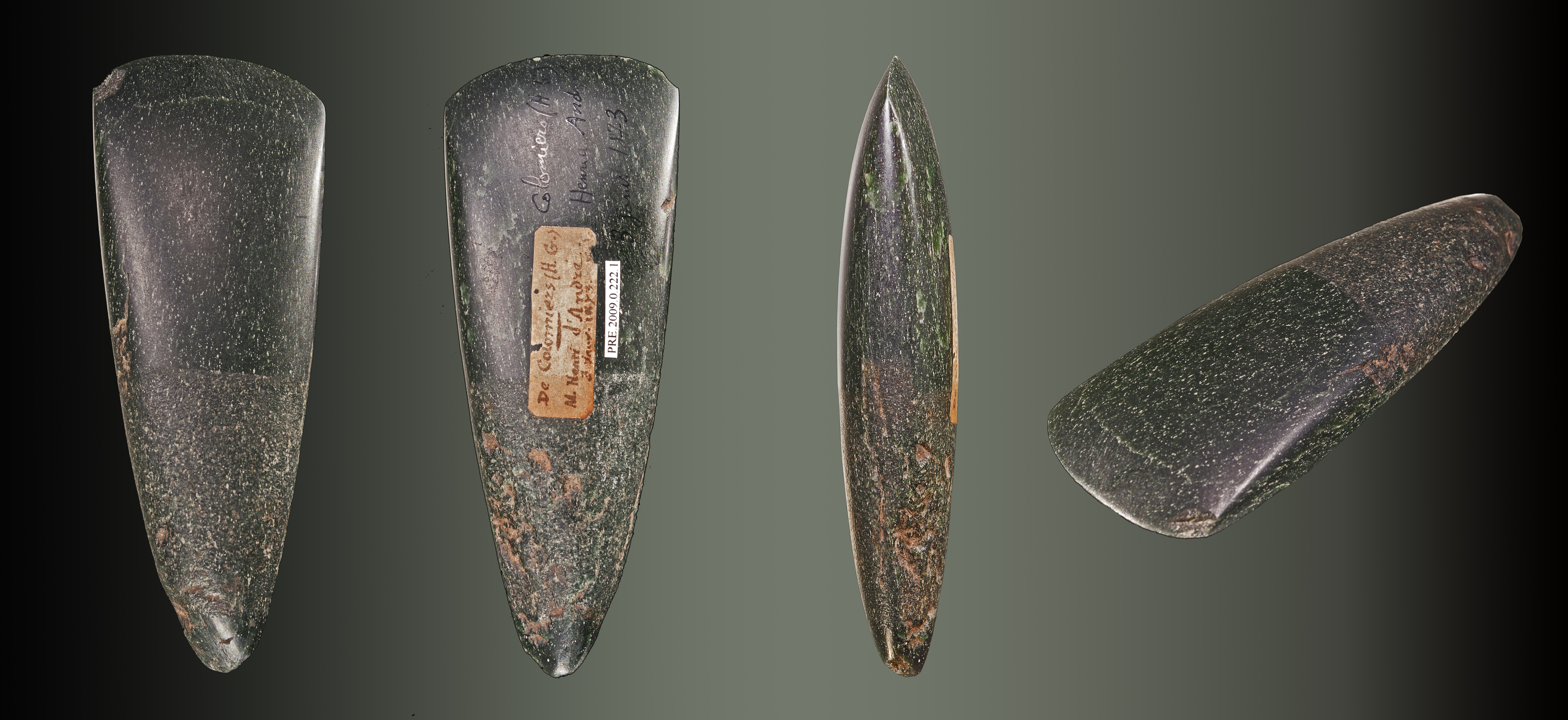
Polished Neolithic jadeitite axe from the Museum of Toulouse

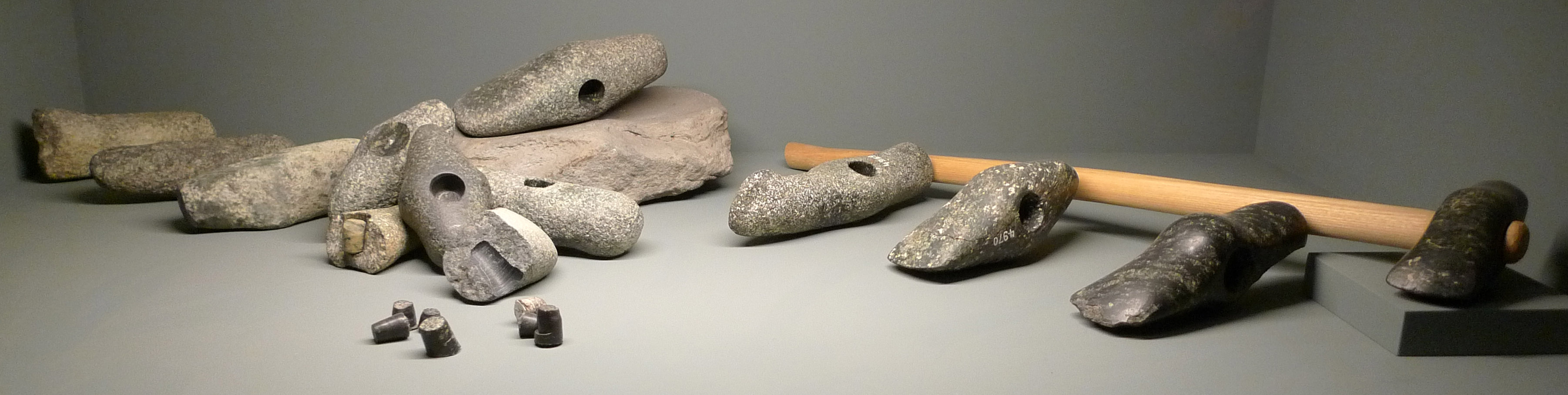
Axe heads found at a 2700 BC Neolithic manufacture site in Switzerland, arranged in the various stages of production from left to right

In prehistoric Japan, ground stone tools appear during the Japanese Paleolithic period, that lasted from around 40,000 BC to 14,000 BC. Elsewhere, ground stone tools became important during the Neolithic period beginning about 10,000 BC. These ground or polished implements are manufactured from larger-grained materials such as basalt, jade and jadeite, greenstone, and some forms of rhyolite, which are not suitable for flaking. The greenstone industry was important in the English Lake District, and is known as the Langdale axe industry. Ground stone implements included adzes, celts, and axes, which were manufactured by a labour-intensive, time-consuming method of repeated grinding against an abrasive stone, often with water as a lubricant. Because of their coarse surfaces, some ground stone tools were used for grinding plant foods and were polished not just by intentional shaping, but also by use. Manos are hand stones used in conjunction with metates for grinding corn or grain. Polishing increased the intrinsic mechanical strength of the axe. Polished stone axes were important for the widespread clearance of woods and forests during the Neolithic period, when crop and livestock farming developed on a large scale. They are widely distributed and were traded over long distances, since the best rock types were often very local. They also became venerated objects, and were frequently buried in long barrows or round barrows with their former owners.

During the Neolithic period, large axes were made from flint nodules by knapping a rough shape, a so-called "rough-out". Such products were traded across a wide area. The rough-outs were then polished to achieve a fine finish, forming the axe head. Polishing increased the product's strength and durability. There were many sources of supply, including Grimes Graves in Suffolk, Cissbury in Sussex and Spiennes near Mons in Belgium to mention but a few. In Britain, there were numerous small quarries in downland areas where flint was removed for local use, for example.

Many other rocks were used to make axes from stones, including the Langdale axe industry as well as numerous other sites such as Penmaenmawr and Tievebulliagh in Co Antrim, Ulster. In Langdale, there are many outcrops of the greenstone that were exploited and knapped where the stone was extracted. The sites exhibit piles of waste flakes and rejected rough-outs. Polishing improved the mechanical strength of the tools, so increasing their life and effectiveness. Many other tools were developed using the same techniques. Such products were traded across the country and abroad.

== Aboriginal Australian use ==
Stone axes from 35,000 years ago are the earliest known use of a stone tool in Australia. Other stone tools varied in type and use among Aboriginal Australian peoples, depending on geographical region, and their form and structure varied among different cultural and linguistic groups. The locations of the various artefacts, as well as whole geological features, demarcated the territorial and cultural boundaries of the lands of various linguistic and cultural groups. They developed trade networks and demonstrated sophistication in working many different types of stone for various uses, including tools, food utensils, and weapons, and modified their stone tools over the millennia to adapt to changing environments. Oral traditions passed down the skills through the ages.

Complex stone tools were used by the Gunditjmara of western Victoria until relatively recently. Many examples are now held in museums.

Flaked stone tools were made by extracting a sharp fragment of stone from a larger piece, called a core, by hitting it with a "hammerstone". Both the flakes and the hammerstones could be used as tools. The best types of stone for these tools are hard, brittle stones, rich in silica, such as quartzite, chert, flint, silcrete and quartz (the latter particularly in the Kimberleys of Western Australia). These were quarried from bedrock or collected as pebbles from watercourses and beaches, and often carried for long distances. The flake could be used immediately for cutting or scraping, but were sometimes modified in a process called reduction to sharpen or resharpen the flake.

Across northern Australia, especially in Arnhem Land, the "Leilira blade", a rectangular stone flake struck from quartzite or silcrete, was used as a spear tip and as a knife, sometimes 30 cm (12 in) long. Tasmania did not have spears or stone axes, but the people there used tools adapted to the climate and environment, such as spongolite. In north-western Australia, "Kimberley point", a small triangular stone point, was created using kangaroo bone which had been shaped with stone into an awl, to make small serrations in the blade.

Apart from being used as weapons and for cutting, grinding (grindstones), piercing, and pounding, some stones, notably ochres, were used as pigment for painting.

== Modern uses ==
Stone tools are still commonly used by humans.

The invention of the flintlock gun mechanism in the sixteenth century produced a demand for specially shaped gunflints. The gunflint industry survived until the middle of the twentieth century in some places, including in the English town of Brandon.

Threshing boards with lithic flakes have been used in agriculture since the Neolithic and are still used today in regions where agriculture has not been mechanized and industrialized.

The Ohlone people of the San Francisco Bay area observe modernization in their social environments, and the stone tools (mortar and pestle) they used in the past are now collected by their descendants as a remembrance of their history.

Glassy stones (flint, quartz, jasper, agate) were used with a variety of iron pyrite or marcasite stones as percussion fire starter tools. That was the most common method of producing fire in pre-industrial societies. Stones were later superseded by the use of steel, ferrocerium, and matches.

For specialist purposes, glass knives are still made and used today, particularly for cutting thin sections for electron microscopy in a technique known as microtomy. Freshly cut blades are always used because their edges are very sharp. These knives are made from high-quality manufactured glass, however, not from natural raw materials such as chert or obsidian. Surgical knives made from obsidian are still used in some delicate surgeries, as they are sharper and cause less damage to tissues than metal surgical knives, and the resulting wounds heal more quickly. In 1975, American archaeologist Don Crabtree manufactured obsidian scalpels to perform surgery on his own body.

== See also ==
- Chaîne opératoire
- Eccentric flint (archaeology)
- Knapping
- Langdale axe industry
- Lithic technology
- Manuport
- Mount William stone axe quarry
- Prismatic blade
- Thunderstone (folklore)
