= Termination type =

Characteristic in lithic reduction

In lithic reduction, termination type is a characteristic indicating the manner in which the distal end of a lithic flake detaches from a core (Andrefsky 1998:18). Common types include:

- Step/snap termination – these occur when a flake snaps or breaks during removal, resulting in an abrupt right-angle break.
- Hinge termination – results when the applied force rolls away from the core or objective piece, creating a rounded or blunted distal end.
- Overshot/outrepasse/plunging termination - occurs when the applied force dips and removes a section of the opposite margin of the artifact or the distal end of the core. Also referred to as a reverse hinge termination.
- Perverse termination - "twisting" breaks resulting from when the applied force is redirected through the material in a helical fashion;
- Feather/monotomic termination – a smooth termination that results in a feathered distal end. The distal ends of these flakes are only a few molecules thick, are extremely sharp, and indicate a flawless detachment. These are the intended results of some lithic reduction techniques, and are very desirable for opportunistic tool use that does not require retouching or sharpening.
