= Kenyaite =

Phyllosilicate mineral

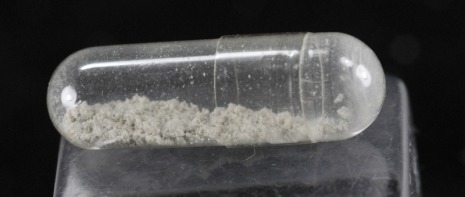
Ground Kenyaite in a sample container

Kenyaite is a mineral and is a peculiar sodium silicate having a layered structure. It has a chemical formula of Na_{2}Si_{22}O_{41}(OH)_{8} • 6H_{2}O, which means it is made up of variations of different materials including sodium, silicon, hydrogen, and oxygen. The chemical composition of kenyaite is subject to change: when the interlayer of water has different variations; it undergoes different physical conditions; by partial to full exchange of the sodium ions by protons when kenyaite comes into contact with water. This is typical for intracrystalline reactive materials.

== Name ==
The name kenyaite derives from Kenya as this is the location where it was first discovered.

== Physical properties ==
Kenyaite is white in colour and can range from being transparent to translucent. It has a hardness of roughly 4 on Mohs scale of mineral hardness. Kenyaite has a white streak and a density of 3.18. This mineral has a molecular mass of 1,563.99 g/mol. The mineral habits within kenyaite can be described as concretionary and nodular. These nodules range in size and shape.

== Reactions ==
Kenyaite has been shown to form from the leaching of magadiite, and also from evaporating saline brines in playa evaporite alkaline lake deposits. It can be transformed into quartz when kenyaite decomposes.

== Distribution of Deposits ==
Kenyaite is found in different parts of the globe including, near Trinity Lake, California, Kafra, Niger, and Lake Magadi in Kenya.
