= Tool stone =

Type of stone used to produce stone tools

In archaeology, a tool stone is a type of stone that is used to manufacture stone tools, or tools that use stone as raw material.

Generally speaking, tools that require a sharp edge are made using cryptocrystalline materials that fracture in an easily controlled conchoidal manner. Cryptocrystalline tool stones include flint and chert, which are fine-grained sedimentary materials; rhyolite and felsite, which are igneous flowstones; and obsidian, a form of natural glass created by igneous processes. These materials fracture in a predictable fashion, and are easily resharpened. For more information on this subject, see lithic reduction.

Large-grained materials such as basalt, granite and sandstone may also be used as tool stones, but for a very different purpose: they are ideal for ground stone artifacts. Whereas cryptocrystalline materials are most useful for killing and processing animals, large-grained materials are usually used for processing plant matter. Their rough faces often make excellent surfaces for grinding plant seeds. With much effort, some large-grained stones may be ground down into awls, adzes, and axes.

== See also ==
- Cupstone
- Lithic technology
