= Hertzian cone =

Cone produced when an object passes through a solid

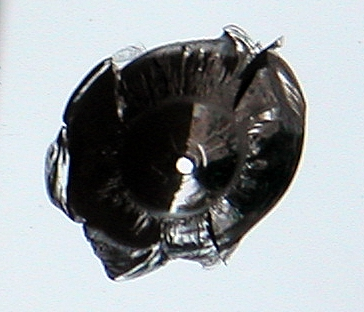
A small hole broken through a window pane.

A Hertzian cone is the cone produced when an object passes through a solid, such as a bullet through glass. More technically, it is a cone of force that propagates through a brittle, amorphous, or cryptocrystalline solid material from a point of impact. This force eventually removes a full or partial cone in the material. This is the physical principle that explains the form and characteristics of the flakes removed from a core of tool stone during the process of lithic reduction.

This phenomenon is named after the German physicist Heinrich Rudolf Hertz, who first described this type of wave-front propagation through various media.

Although it might not be agreed by all, natural phenomena which have been grouped with the Hertzian cone phenomena include the crescentic "chatter marks" made on smoothed bedrock by glacial ice dragging along boulders at its base, the numerous crescentic impact marks sometimes seen on pebbles and cobbles, and the shatter cones found at bolide impact sites. James Byous, working independently (at privately funded Dowd Research, Savannah, Georgia USA) has made a protracted study of Hertzian cones. Some of his work may be found via sharing points or directly at Dowd Research. He has produced a comprehensive glossary on Hertzian fractures and related terms. A Hertzian cone is often 104 degrees when created by an indenter. Smaller cones may be produced due to lack of size of the material, or irregularities in the structure of the material. However, in ballistics, the faster the projectile the steeper the edges and angle of the cone.

== See also ==
- Conchoidal fracture
- Flint knapping
