= Bulb of applied force =

Characteristic in archaeology

In lithic analysis, a subdivision of archaeology, a bulb of applied force (also known as a bulb of percussion or simply bulb of force) is a defining characteristic of a lithic flake. Bulb of applied force was first correctly described by Sir John Evans, the cofounder of prehistoric archeology. However, bulb of percussion was coined scientifically by W.J. Sollas. When a flake is detached from its parent core, a portion of the Hertzian cone of force caused by the detachment blow is detached with it, leaving a distinctive bulb on the flake and a corresponding flake scar on the core. In the case of a unidirectional core, the bulb of applied force is produced by an initiated crack formed at the point of contact, which begins making the Hertzian cone. The outward pressure increases causing the crack to curve away from the core and the bulb formation. The bulb of applied force forms below the striking platform as a slight bulge. If the flake is completely crushed, the bulb will not be visible. Bulbs of applied force may be distinctive, moderate, or diffuse, depending upon the force of the blow used to detach the flake, and upon the type of material used as a fabricator. The bulb of applied force can indicate the mass or density of the tool used in the application of the force. The bulb may also be an indication of the angle of the force. This information is helpful to archaeologists in understanding and recreating the process of flintknapping. Generally, the harder the material used as a fabricator, the more distinctive the bulb of applied force. Soft hammer percussion has a low diffuse bulb while hard hammer percussion usually leaves a more distinct and noticeable bulb of applied force. Pressure flake also allowed for diffuse bulbs. The bulb of percussion of a flake or blade is convex and the core has a corresponding concave bulb. The concave bulb on the core is known as the negative bulb of percussion. Bulbs of applied force are not usually present if the flake has been struck off naturally. This allows archaeologists to identify and distinguish natural breakage from human artistry. The three main bulb types are flat or nondescript, normal, and pronounced. A flat or nondescript bulb is poorly defined and does not rise up on the ventral surface. A normal bulb on the ventral side has average height and well-defined. A pronounced bulb rises up on ventral side and is very large.

When explained visually, the bulb of percussion is visible on the ventral face as opposed to the dorsal face (where it is smoother) and considered to be on the "inside" of the parent core. The bulb of percussion is the primary feature that identifies the ventral surface of a flake or blade artifact. Locating its position reveals which is the proximal end of an artifact. Along the proximal end, there may be the formation of ripple marks. These ripple marks allow for the direction traveled by the applied force through the lithic when it was detached. The striking of the flake is usually produced by knapping (or flintknapping), a process which requires the user to chip away material from high-silica stones like "flint" in a carefully controlled manner with special devices to create sharp projectile points or tools. A common characteristic that is associated with the bulb of applied force is a bulbar scar. This scar is from a small chip or flake on the bulb. This is known as an eraillure flake scar. It is produced during the initial impact of flake removal. Occasionally, there is more than one contact point on a striking platform which creates a series of superimposed waves. The eraillure flake is a chip removed through contact of a dominant force wave that creates the conchoidal flake and inferior waves. Bulb of applied force is not produced by bipolar technology or wedging initiation.

== See also ==
- Arrowhead
- Flint
- Knapping
