= Cryptocrystalline =

Type of rock texture

Cryptocrystalline is a rock texture made up of such minute crystals that its crystalline nature is only vaguely revealed even microscopically in thin section by transmitted polarized light. Among the sedimentary rocks, chert and flint are cryptocrystalline. Carbonado, a form of diamond, is also cryptocrystalline. Volcanic rocks, especially of the felsic type such as felsites and rhyolites, may have a cryptocrystalline groundmass as distinguished from pure obsidian (felsic) or tachylyte (mafic), which are natural rock glasses. Agate and onyx are examples of cryptocrystalline silica (chalcedony). The quartz crystals in chalcedony are so tiny that they cannot be distinguished with the naked eye.

== See also ==
- List of rock textures
- Macrocrystalline
- Microcrystalline
- Nanocrystalline
- Rock microstructure
