= Aztec warfare =

Warfare of the Mesoamerican civilization

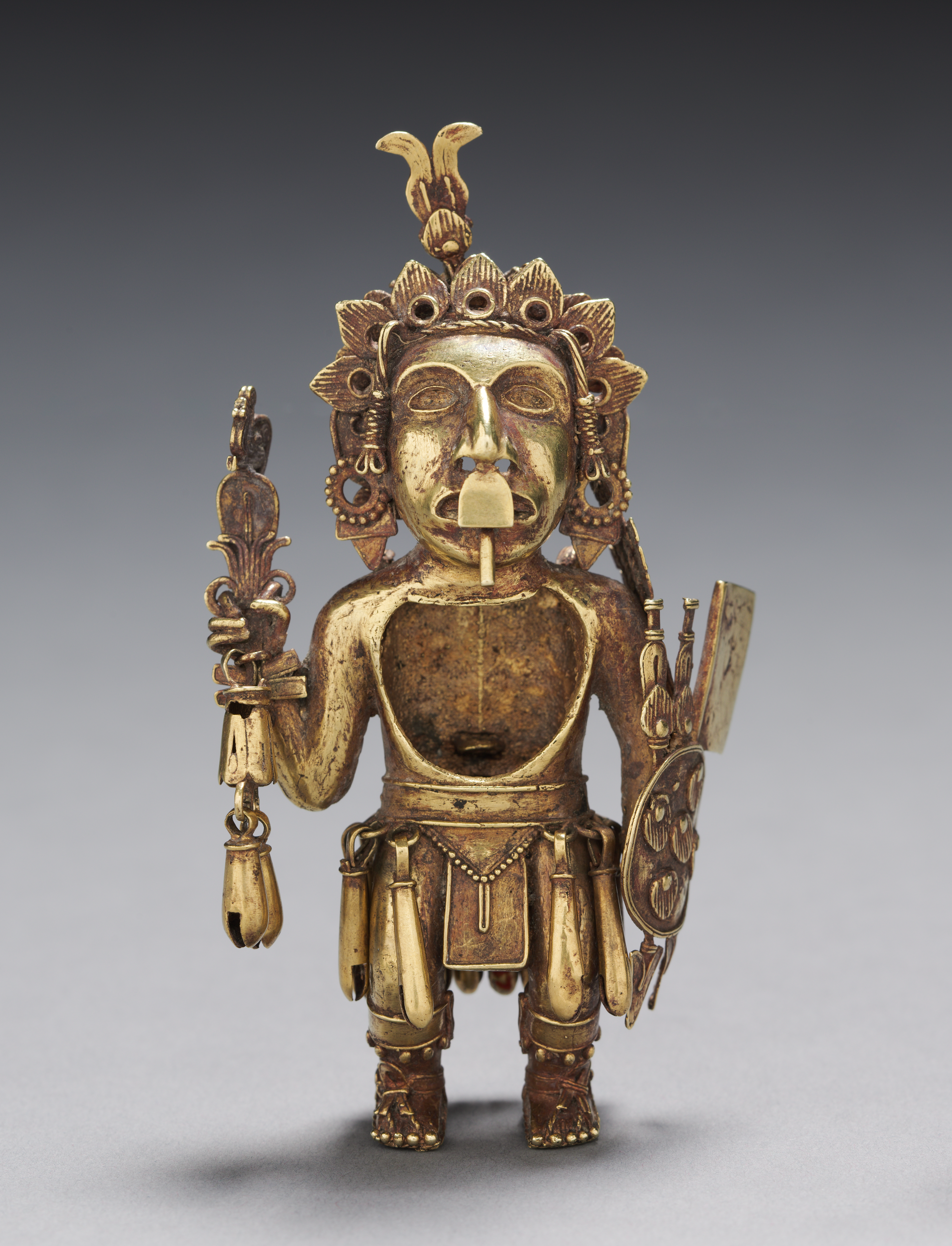
Gold-silver-copper alloy figure of an Aztec warrior, who holds a dartthrower, darts, and a shield

Aztec warfare concerns the aspects associated with the military conventions, forces, weaponry and strategic expansions conducted by the Late Postclassic Aztec civilizations of Mesoamerica, including particularly the military history of the Aztec Triple Alliance involving the city-states of Tenochtitlan, Texcoco, Tlacopan and other allied polities of the central Mexican region. This united the Mexica, Apulteca, and Chichimeca people through marriages.

The Aztec armed forces were typically made up of a large number of commoners (yāōquīzqueh [jaː.oːˈkiːskeʔ], "those who have gone to war") who possessed extensive military training, and a smaller but still considerable number of highly professional warriors belonging to the nobility (pīpiltin [piːˈpiɬtin]) and who were organized into warrior societies and ranked according to their achievements. The Aztec state's primary purpose was political expansion and dominance of and exaction of tribute from other city-states, a purpose that relied on constant warfare. Aztec society was also centered on warfare: every Aztec male received basic military training from an early age and one of the few possible opportunities of upward social mobility for commoners (mācehualtin [maːseˈwaɬtin]) was through military achievement, especially the taking of captives (māltin [ˈmaːɬtin], singular malli). Thus only specifically chosen men served in the military. The sacrifice of war captives was an important part of many of the Aztec religious festivals. Warfare was thus the main driving force of both Aztec economy and religion.

== Warfare in Aztec society ==
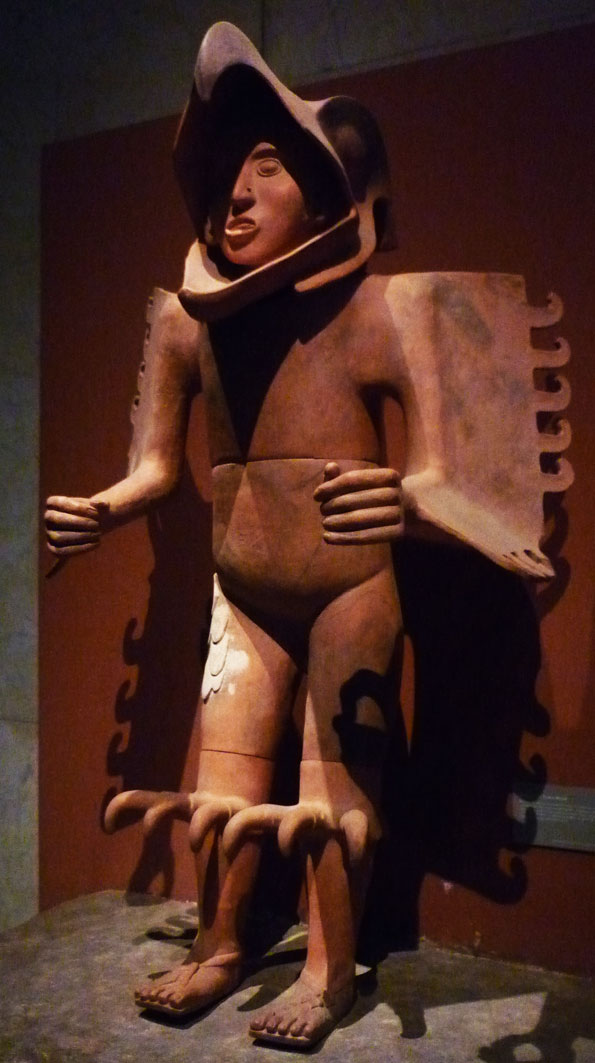
Terracotta statue depicting an Eagle Warrior

There were two main objectives in Aztec warfare. The first objective was political: the subjugation of enemy city-states (altepetl) in order to exact tribute and expand Aztec political hegemony. The second was religious: the taking of captives to be sacrificed in religious ceremonies. These dual objectives not only influenced the kind of warfare practiced by the Aztecs but also meant that warfare had a huge impact on everyday life.

=== Coronation campaigns ===
The first action of a ruler-elect was to stage a military campaign, which served two purposes. First, it allowed the tlatoani [t͡ɬaʔtoˈaːni] to show his ability as a warrior and thus make it clear to subject states that his rule would be as tough on any rebellious conduct as that of his predecessor. Second, this initial campaign provided abundant captives for his coronation ceremony. A failed coronation campaign was seen as an extremely bad omen for the rule of a tlatoani and could lead to rebellions by previously subjected city states. A failed campaign could also result in noblemen's distrust of the tlatoani's ability to rule. This was the case for Tizoc, who was poisoned by the Aztec nobles after several failed military campaigns.

=== Flower war ===
The second kind of warfare practiced by the Aztecs was referred to as flower war (xōchiyāōyōtl [ʃoːt͡ʃijaːˈoːjoːt͡ɬ]). This kind of warfare was fought by ceremonial armies after a previous arrangement between the parties involved. These armies were composed primarily of nobles and the more skilled warriors. It was not aimed directly at the enemy city-state (altepetl) but served a number of other purposes. These wars were a show of power for the competing armies; intimidation played a huge role in Aztec warfare in general. Another often cited purpose is the taking of sacrificial captives and this was certainly an important part of most Aztec warfare. Friar Diego Durán and the chronicles based on the Crónica X states that the Xochiyaoyotl was instigated by Tlacaelel during the great Mesoamerican famine of 1450–1454 under the reign of Moctezuma I. These sources state that Tlacaelel arranged with the leaders of Tlaxcala, Cholula, and Huexotzinco, and Tliliuhquitepec to engage in ritual battles that would provide all parties with enough sacrificial victims to appease the gods. Ross Hassig (1988) however poses four main political purposes of xochiyaoyotl:

1. This kind of warfare gave the Aztecs a chance to demonstrate their military might. Since the Aztec army was larger than their adversaries that were normally smaller city states and since the numbers of combatants on each side were fixed, the Aztec army was sending a much smaller percentage of their total forces than their opponents. Losing a flower war would then be less damaging for the Aztec army than for its opponents.
2. This also meant that an objective was attrition – the large Aztec army could afford to engage in small scale warfare much more frequently than their opponents, who would then gradually tire until they were ripe for actual conquest.
3. It also allowed a ruler to maintain hostilities, at low intensity, while occupied by other matters.
4. Mainly Xochiyaoyotl served as propaganda both towards other city-states and to the Aztec people allowing the Aztec rulers to continuously demonstrate their might with a constant influx of war captives to Tenochtitlan.
5. Most importantly, the flower war served as a function of capturing victims to perform ritual sacrifice. To the east of the growing Aztec empire was the city-state of Tlaxcala. The Tlaxcalans were a powerful people who shared their culture and language with the people of the Aztec empire proper. They were closely related to the empire, though never actually conquered by it. An agreement was made with the Tlaxcalans to have ritual battles called xochiyaoyotl. The flower war is a ritual war for Aztec people taking victim back and sacrifice them to their god Xipe Totec (Tezcatlipoca).

=== Birth ritual ===
Warriors were essential to Aztec life and culture. At birth, an Aztec boy would receive two symbols of being a warrior. A shield would be placed in his left hand, and an arrow would be placed in his right. After a short ceremony the newly born boy's umbilical cord, shield, and arrow would be taken to a battlefield to be buried by a renowned warrior. These parts would symbolize the rise of a warrior. Each shield and arrow would be made specifically for that boy and would resemble his family and the gods. Their warrior school would be chosen during this ritual so that the boy would be claimed by the god Tezcatlipoca, the patron god for all warriors. Tezcatlipoca would bless the boy to live a long warrior's life. This ritual was meant to instill societal expectations at an early age.

As for girls, at birth their umbilical cord would be buried usually under the family fireplace, representing the woman's future life to be in the home, taking care of household needs.

=== Men's life outside warfare ===
Boys started training for warfare at an early age. It was the boys' religious responsibility to train and fight for their people. Since all boys were required to train, Aztec society had no standing army. Warriors would be drafted through a tequital, a payment of goods and labor enforced by the government. When not engaged in battle, many warriors were farmers and tradesmen, learning their trade from their fathers. Warriors were married by their early twenties and were a vital part of Aztec daily life. While most warriors began as lower-class citizens, being a warrior did present a way to move up in Aztec society. If they were successful as a warrior, they would be presented with gifts and recognized publicly for their accomplishments in battle. If they reached the rank of Eagle or Jaguar warrior, they would be considered nobles. Especially in the latter case, the prized warrior would become a full-time soldier working for the city-state to protect merchants and the city itself.

=== Women's roles ===
Women did not directly participate in on-field warfare. Women in Aztec society were only allowed to interact in rituals before or after warfare, such as human sacrifices and mock battles during festivals. Instead, women's warfare was understood as occurring in childbirth. The mother had to capture the baby, and if successful, she would be praised as if she were a warrior. If the mother died during childbirth, she would go to the warrior's afterlife. Overall, women stayed off the battlefield and held distinct roles within the household.

=== Appearance of warriors ===
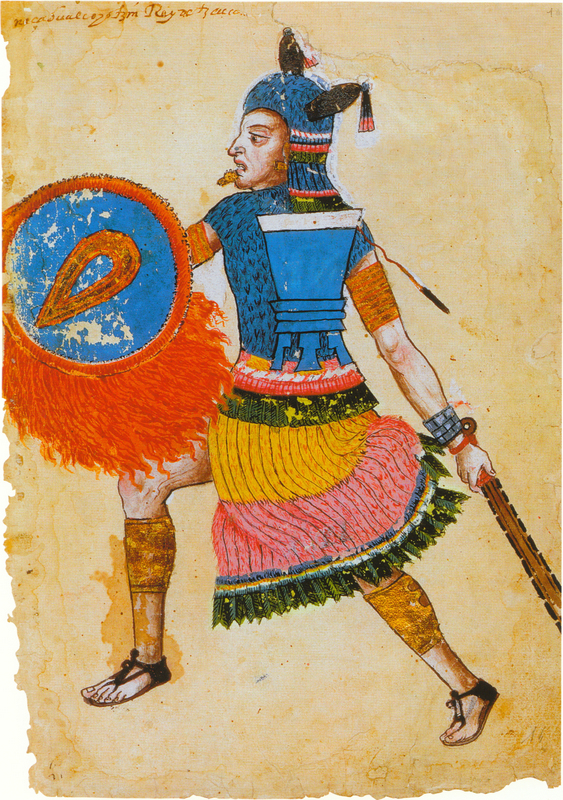
Nezahualcoyotl dressed in cotton armor with an obsidian sword, shield, and a helmet in the shape of a coyote or wolf. Codex Ixtlilxochitl, c. 1550.

Aztec culture valued appearance, and appearance defined people within society. Warriors had a very distinct appearance. Their dress would be in relation to their success and triumph on the battlefield. Gaining ranks as an Aztec warrior was based on how many enemy soldiers that warrior had captured. A warrior who had taken one captive would carry a macuahuitl, and a chimalli without any decorations. He would also be rewarded with a manta, and an orange cape with a stripe, a carmine-colored loincloth, and a scorpion-knotted designed cape. (Daily, 145). A two-captive warrior would be able to wear sandals on the battlefield. He would also have a feathered warrior suit and a cone-shaped cap. The feathered suit and the cone-shaped cap appearance are the most common within the Codex Mendoza. A four captive warrior, which would be an eagle or jaguar warrior, would wear an actual jaguar skin over his body with an open slot for the head. These warriors would have expensive jewelry and weapons. Their hairstyle was also unique to their status. The hair would sit at the top of their head and be parted into two sections with a red cord wrapped around it. The red cord would also have an ornament of green, blue, and red feathers. The shields were made of wicker wood and leather, so very few survived.

=== Fortifications ===
The Aztecs didn't normally maintain tight territorial control within their empire but nonetheless, there are examples of fortifications built by the Aztecs. Prominent examples are the strongholds at Oztuma (Oztōmān [osˈtoːmaːn]) where the Aztecs built a garrison to keep the rebellious Chontales in line; in Quauhquechollan (modern-day Huauquechula) near Atlixco where the Aztecs built a garrison in order to always have forces close to their traditional enemies the Tlaxcalteca, Chololteca and Huexotzinca; and in Malinalco near Toluca. The latter is where Ahuitzotl built garrisons and fortifications to keep watch over the Matlatzinca, Mazahua and Otomies and to always have troops close to the enemy Tarascan state the borders with which were also guarded and at least partly fortified on both sides.

== Organization ==
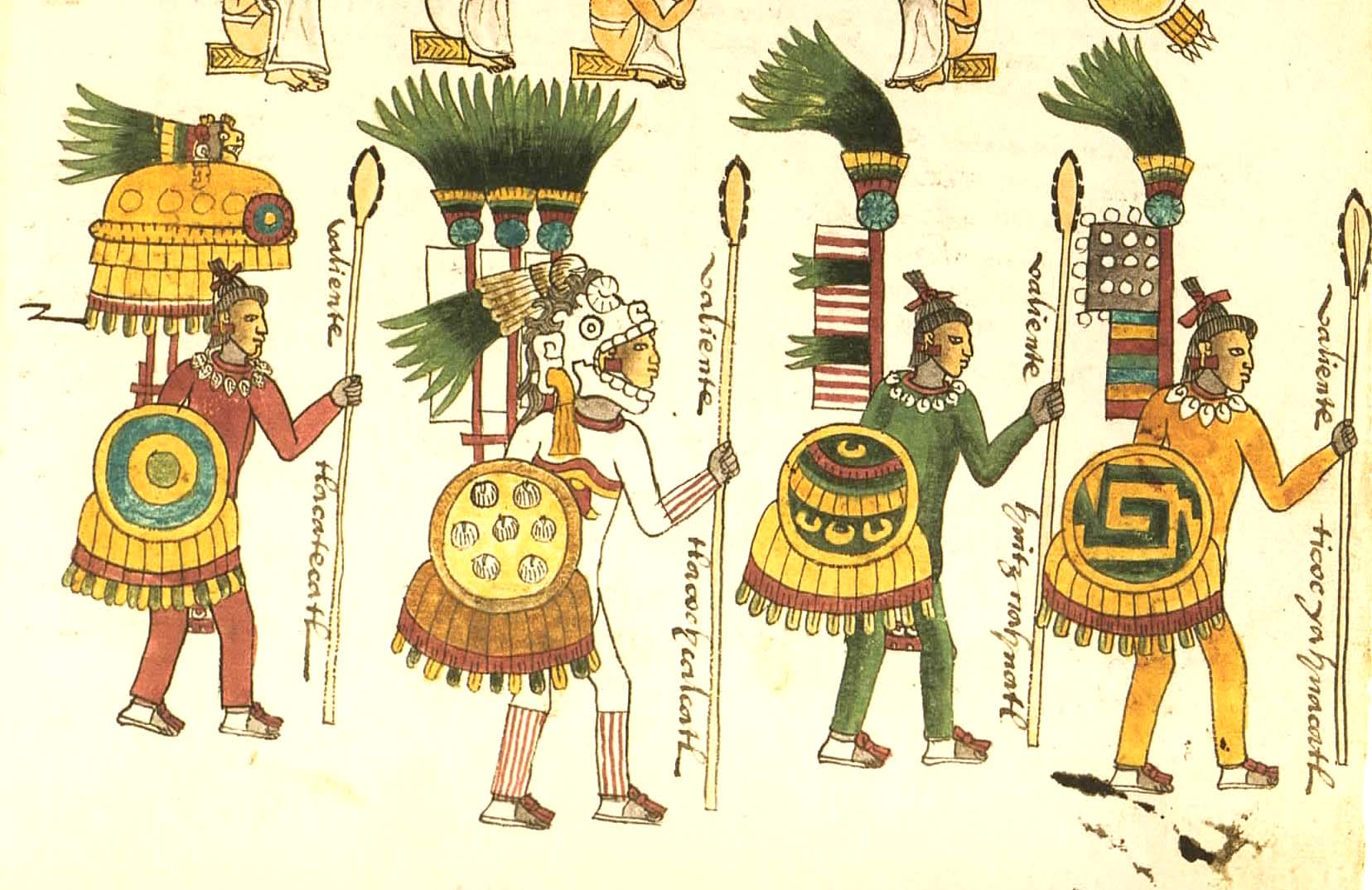
Aztec warriors as depicted in the Codex Mendoza

The Aztec army was organized into two groups. The commoners were organized into "wards" (calpōlli) [kaɬˈpoːlːi] that were under the leadership of tiachcahuan [tiat͡ʃˈkawaːn] ("leaders") and calpoleque [kalpoːleʔkeʔ] ("calpulli owners"). The nobles were organized into professional warrior societies. Apart from the Tlatoani, the war leaders of the Aztecs were the High General, the Tlacochcalcatl [t͡ɬakot͡ʃˈkaɬkat͡ɬ] ("The man from the house of darts") and the General the Tlācateccatl [t͡ɬaːkaˈtek.kat͡ɬ] ("Cutter of men"). The Tlacochcalcatl and Tlacateccatl also had to name successors prior to any battle so that if they died they could be immediately replaced. Priests also took part in warfare, carrying the effigies of deities into battle alongside the armies. The army also had boys about the age of twelve along with them serving as porters and messengers; this was mainly for training measures. The adjacent image shows the Tlacateccatl and the Tlacochcalcatl and two other officers (probably priests) known as Huitznahuatl and Ticocyahuacatl, all dressed in their tlahuiztli suits.

Calpulli were an important part of Aztec warfare. Calpulli acted as a large house for your neighbors and local community in the Aztec culture. Calpulli were controlled by certain high ranking families and helped plan out the territory functions, coordinate farming strategies and food production plans, as well as collecting taxes for the empire. Family and pride were extremely important aspects of Aztec culture, so it was very important to fight for your calpulli and fly your banner with pride. Calpulli operated schools for young men to transform into warriors.

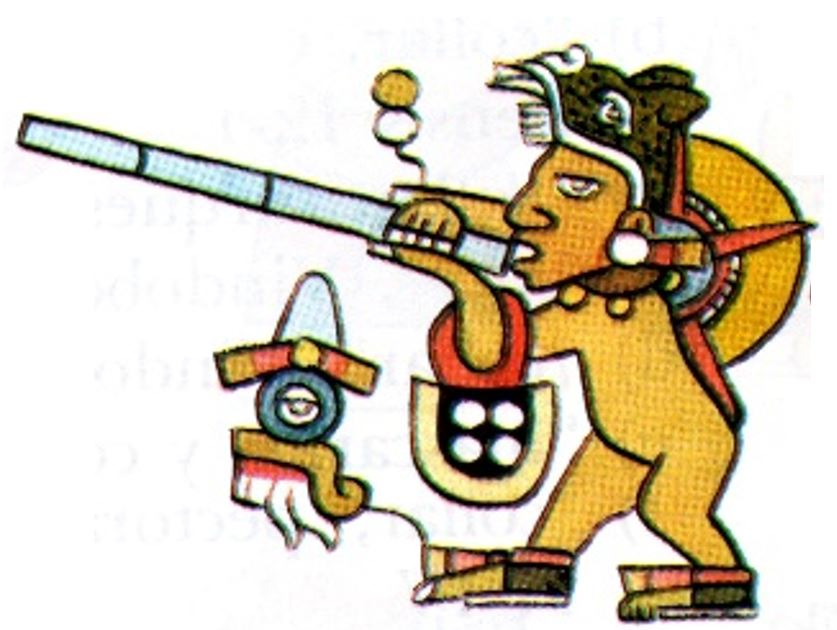
Blowpipe or Tlacalhuazcuahuitl

=== Training ===
The formal education of the Aztecs was to train and teach young boys how to function in their society, particularly as warriors. The Aztecs had a relatively small standing army. Only the elite soldiers, part of the warrior societies (such as the Jaguar Knights), and the soldiers stationed at the few Aztec fortifications were full-time. Nevertheless, every boy was trained to become a warrior with the exception of nobles. Trades such as farming and artisan skills were not taught at the two formal schools. All boys who were between the ages of ten and twenty years old would attend one of the two schools: the Telpochcalli or the neighborhood school for commoners, and the Calmecac which was the exclusive school for nobles. At the Telpochcalli, students would learn the art of warfare, and would become warriors. At the Calmecac students would be trained to become military leaders, priests, government officials, etc.

The sons of commoners were trained in the Tēlpochcalli [teːɬpot͡ʃˈkalːi] "house of youth". Once a boy reached the age of ten, a section of hair on the back of his head was grown long to indicate that he had not yet taken captives in war. At age fifteen, the father of the boy handed the responsibility of training to the telpochcalli, who would then train the boy to become a warrior. The telpochcalli was accountable for the training of approximately 419 to 559 youths between the ages of fifteen and twenty years old. While the boys were in training, they were given basic duties, such as cleaning the house and making fires. The youth were tested to determine how fit they would be for battle by accompanying their leaders on campaigns as shield-bearers. War captains and veteran warriors had the role of training the boys how to handle their weapons. This generally included showing them how to hold a shield, how to hold a sword, how to shoot arrows from a bow and how to throw darts with an atlatl. Boys in training were only considered real men when they captured their first warrior.

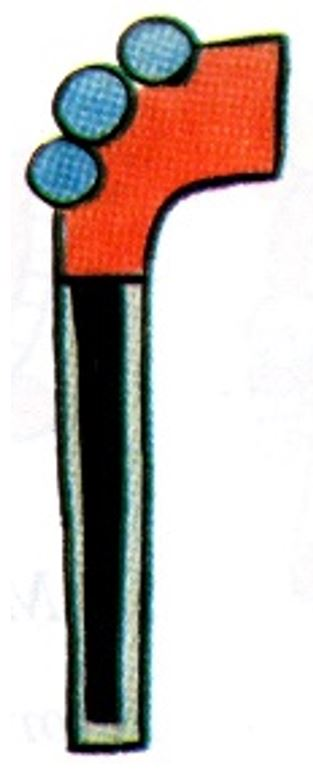
Mixtec curved weapon or curved Tepoztli

Sons of the nobles were trained at the calmecac [kalˈmekak] ("lineage house") and received sophisticated training in warfare from the most experienced warriors in the army, as well as in general courtly subjects such as astronomy, calendrics, rhetorics, poetry and religion. The calmecac were attached to temples as a dedication to patron gods. For example, the calmecac in the main ceremonial complex of Tenochtitlan was dedicated to the god Quetzalcoatl. Although there is uncertainty about the exact ages that boys entered into the calmecac, according to evidence that recorded the king's sons entering at the age of five and sons of other nobles entering between the ages of six and thirteen, it seems that youth began their training here at a younger age than those in the telpochcalli did.

When formal training in handling weapons began at age fifteen, youth would begin to accompany the seasoned warriors on campaigns so that they could become accustomed to military life and lose the fear of battle. At age twenty, those who wanted to become warriors officially went to war. The parents of the youth sought out veteran warriors, bringing them foods and gifts with the objective of securing a warrior to be the sponsor of their child. Ideally, the sponsor would watch over the youth and teach him how to take captives. However, the degree to which the warrior looked after and helped the noble's child depended greatly on the amount of payment received from the parents. Thus, sons of high nobility tended to succeed more often in war than those of lower nobility.

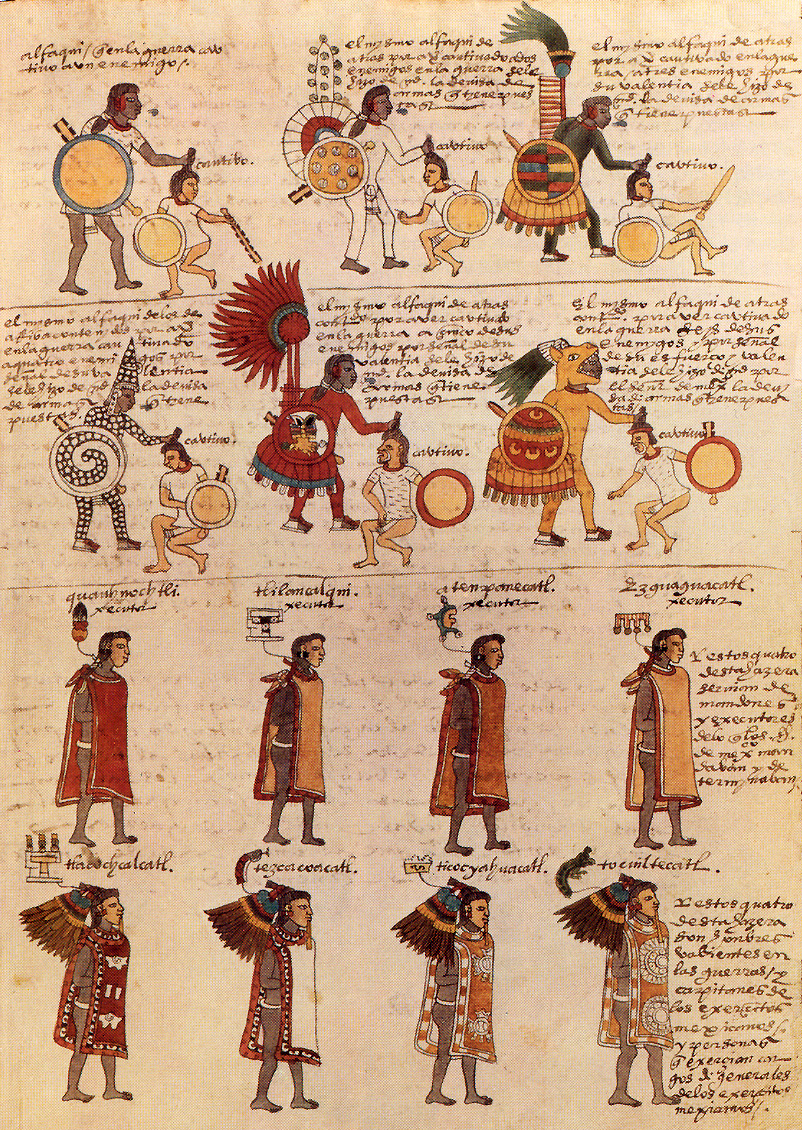
A page from the Codex Mendoza depicting an Aztec warrior priest and Aztec priest rising through the ranks of their orders.

=== Stratification and ranks ===
Broadly, Aztec army ranks were similar to the modern Western rankings of "General" and "Major", as were the groupings of warriors into categories such as "enlisted men" or "officers". However, while parallels can be drawn between the organization of Aztec and Western military systems, as each developed from similar functional necessities, the differences between the two are far greater than the similarities. The members of the Aztec army had loyalties to many different people and institutions, and ranking was not based solely on the position one held in a centralized military hierarchy. Thus, the classification of ranks and statuses cannot be defined in the same manner as that of the modern Western military. The commoners composed the bulk of the army; the lowest were porters (tlamemeh [t͡ɬaˈmemeʔ]) who carried weapons and supplies, next came the youths (identified by the top knot hairstyle they wore) of the telpochcalli led by their sergeants (the tēlpochyahqueh [teːɬpot͡ʃˈjaʔkeʔ] "youth leaders"). Next were the commoners yaoquizqueh. And finally, there were commoners who had taken captives, the so-called tlamanih. [t͡ɬaˈmaniʔ] "captors".

Ranking above these came the nobles of the "warrior societies". These were ranked according to the number of captives they had taken in previous battles; the number of captives determined which of the different suits of honor (called tlahuiztli [t͡ɬaˈwist͡ɬi]) they were allowed to wear, and allowed them certain rights like being able to wear, jewelry, alter their hairstyles, wear warpaint, carry flowers onto the battlefield, pierce, and tattoo themselves. These tlahuiztli became gradually more spectacular as the ranks progressed, allowing the most excellent warriors who had taken many captives to stand out on the battlefield. The higher ranked warriors were also called "Pipiltin".

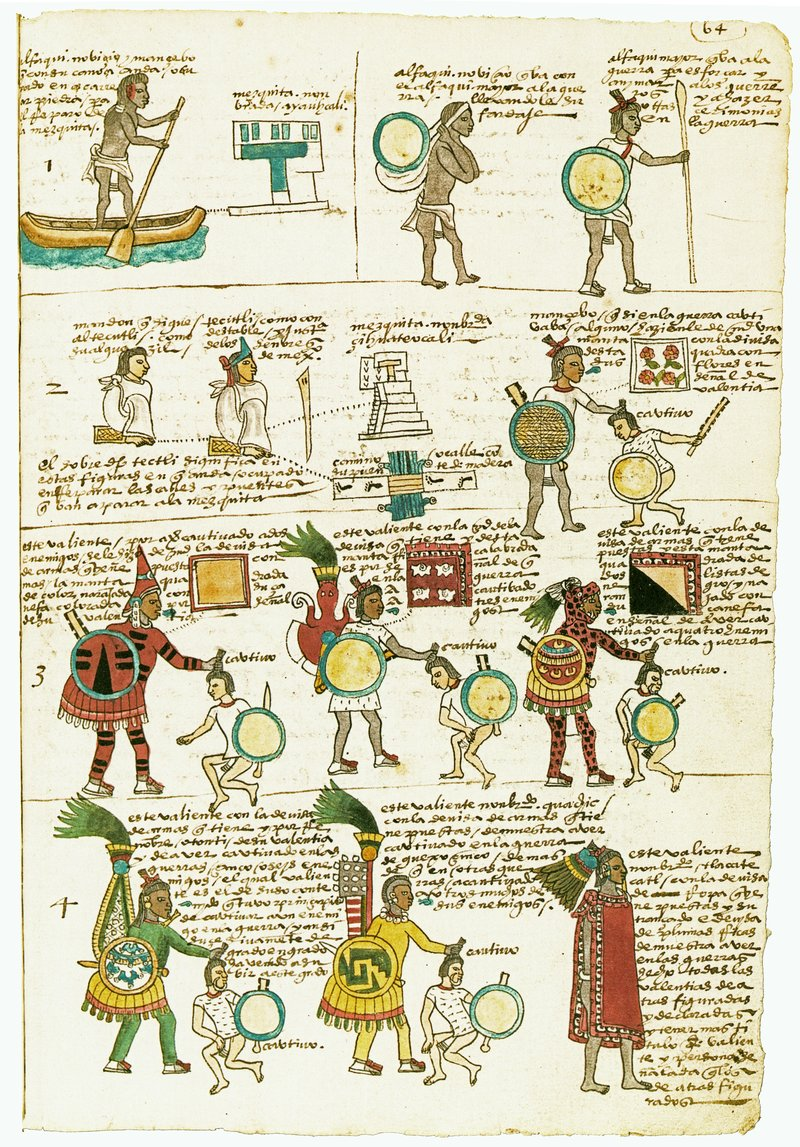
This page from the Codex Mendoza shows the gradual improvements to equipment and tlahuiztli as a warrior progresses through the ranks from "commoner" to "porter" to "warrior" to "captor", and later as a noble progressing in the warrior societies from the "two-captive" to "Butterfly" to "Jaguar warrior" ("Eagle warrior" not included) to "Otomitl" to "Shorn One" and finally as "Tlacateccatl". The Butterfly Warrior, Otomitl, and Shorn One figures wear the pamitl.

=== Warrior societies ===
Commoners excelling in warfare could be promoted to the noble class and could enter some of the warrior societies (at least the Eagles and Jaguars). Sons of nobles trained at the Calmecac, however, were expected to enter into one of the societies as they progressed through the ranks. Warriors could shift from one society and into another when they became sufficiently proficient; exactly how this happened is uncertain. Each society had different styles of dress and equipment as well as styles of body paint and adornments.

==== Tlamanih ====
The Tlamanih were commoners who had taken one captive.

==== Cuextecatl ====
Two captive warriors, recognizable by their red and black tlahuiztli and conical hats. This rank was introduced after the military campaign against the Huastec led by Tlahtoāni Ahuitzotl.

==== Papalotl ====
Papalotl (lit. butterfly) were warriors who had taken three captives; this rank wore "butterfly" like banners on their backs.

==== Eagle and Jaguar warriors ====
Aztec warriors were called a cuāuhocēlōtl [kʷaːwo'seːloːt͡ɬ]. The word cuāuhocēlōtl derives from the Eagle warrior cuāuhtli [kʷaːwt͡ɬi] and the Jaguar Warrior ocēlōtl [o'seːloːt͡ɬ]. Those Aztec warriors who demonstrated the most bravery and who fought well became either jaguar or eagle warriors. Of all of the Aztec warriors, they were the most feared. Both the jaguar and eagle Aztec warriors wore distinguishing helmets and uniforms. The jaguars were identifiable by the jaguar skins they wore over their entire body, with only their faces showing from within the jaguar head. The eagle Aztec warriors, on the other hand, wore feathered helmets including an open beak.

==== Otomies ====
The Otomies (Otōntin) [oˈtoːntin]) were another warrior society who took their name from the Otomi people who were renowned for their fierce fighting. In the historical sources, it is often difficult to discern whether the word otomitl "Otomi" refers to members of the Aztec warrior society or members of the ethnic group who also often joined the Aztec armies as mercenaries or allies. A celebrated member of this warrior sect was Tzilacatzin.

==== The Shorn Ones ====
The "Shorn Ones" (Cuachicqueh [kʷaˈt͡ʃikkeʔ], plural. Cuachic, singular) was the most prestigious warrior society – their heads were shaved apart from a long braid over the left ear. Their bald heads and faces were painted one-half blue and another half red or yellow. They served as imperial shock troops and took on special tasks as well as battlefield assistance roles when needed. Over six captives and dozens of other heroic deeds were required for this rank. They apparently turned down captaincies in order to remain constant battlefield combatants. Recognizable by their yellow tlahuiztli, they had sworn not to take a step backward during a battle on pain of death at the hands of their comrades.

== Strategic intelligence ==
Because the Aztec empire was maintained through warfare or the threat of war with other cities, the gathering of information about those cities was crucial in the process of preparing for a single battle or an extended campaign. Also of great importance was the communication of messages between the military leaders and the warriors on the field so that political initiatives and collaborative ties could be established and maintained. As such, intelligence and communication were vital components in Aztec warfare. The four establishments principally used for these tasks were merchants, formal ambassadors, messengers, and spies.

=== Merchants ===
Merchants, called pochteca (singular: pochtecatl), were perhaps the most valued source of intelligence to the Aztec empire. As they traveled throughout the empire and beyond to trade with groups outside the Aztec's control, the king would often request that the pochteca return from their route with both general and specific information. General information, such as the perceived political climate of the areas traded in, could allow the king to gauge what actions might be necessary to prevent invasions and keep hostility from culminating in large-scale rebellion. As the Aztec's empire expanded, the merchant's role gained increasing importance. Because it became harder to obtain information about distant sites in a timely way, especially for those outside the empire, the feedback and warning received from merchants were invaluable. Often, they were the key to the Aztec army's successful response to external hostility. If a merchant was killed while trading, this was a cause for war. The Aztecs' rapid and violent retaliation following this event is testament to the immense importance that the merchants had to the Aztec empire.

Merchants were very well respected in Aztec society. When merchants traveled south, they transported their merchandise either by canoe or by slaves, who would carry a majority of the goods on their backs. If the caravan was likely to pass through dangerous territory, Aztec warriors accompanied the travelers to provide much-needed protection from wild animals and rival cultures. In return, merchants often provided a military service to the empire by spying on the empire's many enemies while trading in the enemy's cities. They were able to earn their protection while further helping their empire.

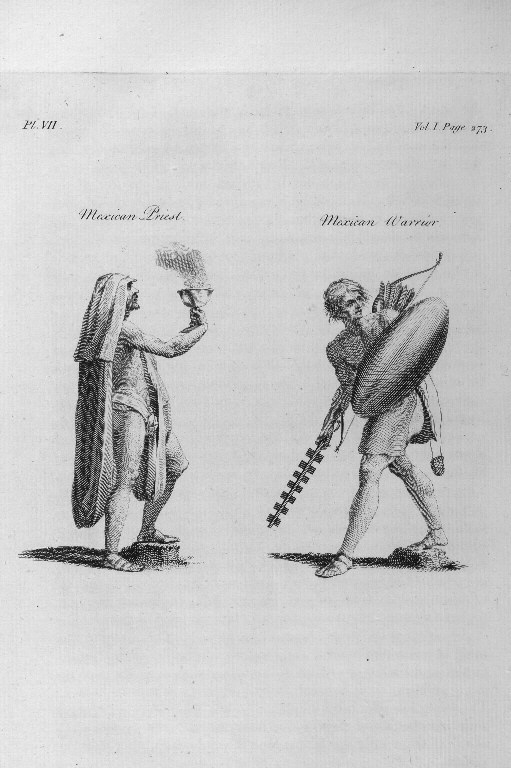
Aztec priest and warrior, 1787

=== Ambassadors ===
Once the Aztecs had decided to conquer a particular city (Altepetl), they sent an ambassador from Tenochtitlan to offer the city protection. They would showcase the advantages cities would gain by trading with the empire. The Aztecs, in return, asked for gold or precious stones for the Emperor. They were given 20 days to decide their request. If they refused, more ambassadors were sent to the cities. However, these ambassadors were used as up front threats. Instead of trade, these men would point out the destruction the empire could and would cause if the city were to decline their offer. They were given another 20 days. If they refused the Aztec army was sent immediately. There were no more warnings. The cities were destroyed and their people were taken as prisoners.

=== Messengers ===
The Aztecs used a system in which men stationed approximately 4.2 kilometres (2.6 mi) apart along main roads relayed messages from the empire to armies in the field or to distant cities and vice versa. For example, the runners might be sent by the king to inform allies to mobilize if a province began to rebel. Messengers also alerted certain tributary cities of the incoming army and their food needs, carried messages between two opposing armies, and delivered news back to Tenochtitlan about the outcome of the war. While messengers were also used in other regions of Mesoamerica, it was the Aztecs who apparently developed this system to a point of having impressive communicative scope.

=== Spies ===
Prior to mobilization, formal spies called quimichtin (lit. Mice) were sent into the territory of the enemy to gather information that would be advantageous to the Aztecs. Specifically, they were requested to take careful note of the terrain that would be crossed, fortification used, details about the army, and their preparations. These spies also sought out those who were dissidents in the area and paid them for information. The quimichtin traveled only by night and even spoke the language and wore the style of clothing specific to the region of the enemy. Due to the extremely dangerous nature of this job (they risked a torturous death and the enslavement of their family if discovered), these spies were amply compensated for their work.

The Aztecs also used a group of trade spies, known as the naualoztomeca. The naualoztomeca were forced to disguise themselves as they traveled. They sought after rare goods and treasures. The naualoztomeca were also used for gathering information at the markets and reporting the information to the higher levels of pochteca.

== Equipment ==
Aztec culture is built on making sacrifices to the gods. Therefore, the goals of warfare were about capturing the enemies, not killing them. This would allow the ability to sacrifice your enemy at a later date. Due to this part of their culture, weapons were designed to hurt the opponent, but not kill them. Weapons such as the macuahuitl, tlahuitolli, yaomime, slings such as tematlat were all designed to hurt the enemy in order to capture them, not kill them.

=== Ranged weapons ===
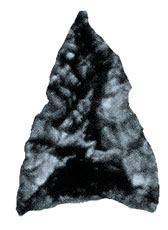
An obsidian projectile point

Ahtlatl: (perhaps lit. "non-sling") This weapon was meant to represent the Aztec God Opochtli. The Aztec dart thrower (known by the Spanish as estólica) was a weapon used to hurl small darts called "tlacochtli" with greater force and from greater range than they could be thrown by hand. This weapon was considered by the Aztecs to be suited only for royalty and the most elite warriors in the army, and was usually depicted as being the weapon of the Gods. Murals at Teotihuacan show warriors using this effective weapon and it is characteristic of the Mesoamerican cultures of central Mexico. Warriors at the front lines of the army would carry the ahtlatl and about three to five tlacochtli, and would launch them after the waves of arrows and sling projectiles as they advanced into battle before engaging into melee combat. The ahtlatl could also throw spears as its name implies "spear thrower". The atlatl is a piece of equipment which was a major advancement for hunting. The atlatl practically lengthens your arms, allowing the ability to throw a spear harder, faster, and further. The atlatl creates more than 10 times the speed of a throw, and over 100 times more impact.

Tlacochtli: The "darts" launched from an Atlatl, not so much darts but more like big arrows about 5.9 feet (1.8 m) long. Tipped with obsidian, fish bones, or copper heads.

Tlahhuītōlli: The Aztec war bow, constructed in a self bow fashion from the wood of the tepozan tree, about 5 feet (1.5 m) long and stringed with animal-sinew. Archers in the Aztec army were designated as Tequihua.

Mīcomītl: The Aztec arrow quiver, usually made out of animal hide, it could hold about 20 arrows.

Yāōmītl: War arrows with barbed obsidian, chert, flint, or bone points. Typically fletched with turkey or duck feathers.

Tēmātlatl: A sling made from maguey fiber. The Aztecs used oval shaped rocks or hand molded clay balls filled with obsidian flakes or pebbles as projectiles for this weapon. Bernal Diaz del Castillo noted that the hail of stones flung by Aztec slingers was so furious that even well armored Spanish soldiers were wounded.

Tlacalhuazcuahuitl: A blowgun consisting of a hollow reed using poisoned darts for ammunition. The darts used for this weapon were made out of sharpened wood fletched with cotton and usually doused in the neurotoxic secretions from the skin of tree frogs found in jungle areas of central Mexico. This was used primarily for hunting rather than warfare.

=== Melee weapons ===
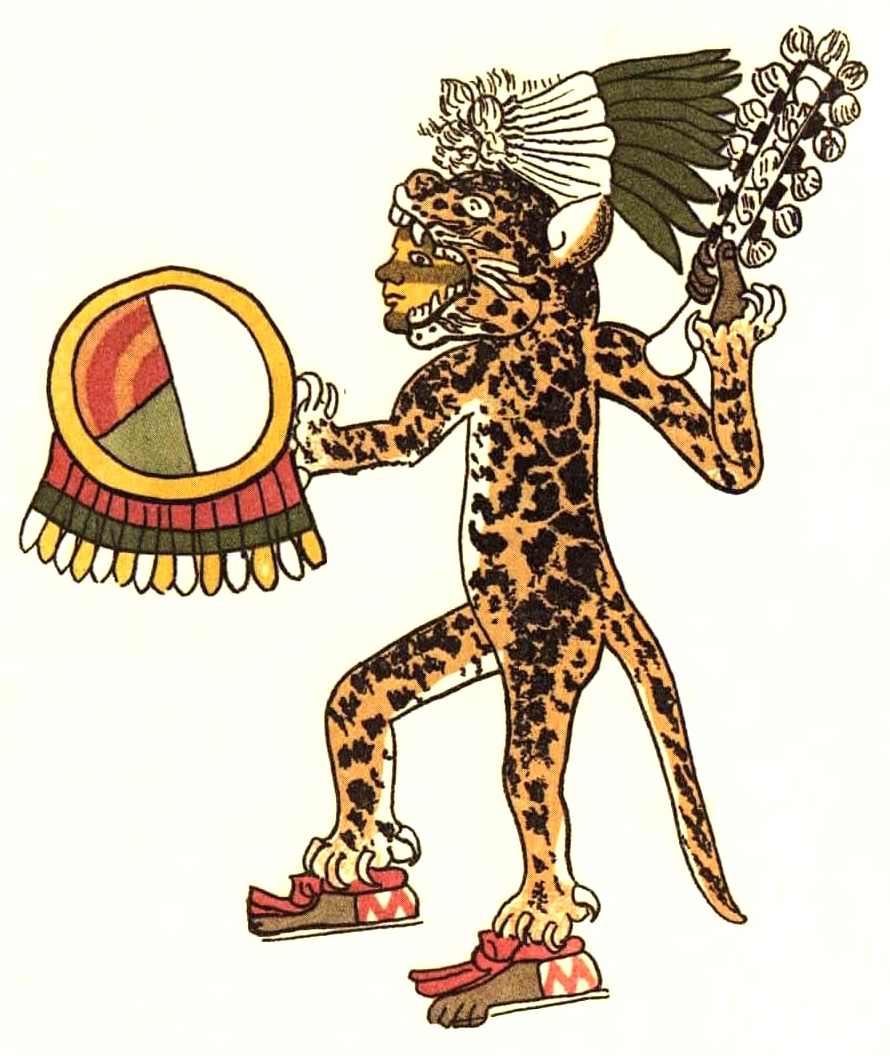
An Aztec Jaguar Warrior Ready For Battle according to the Codex Magliabechiano.

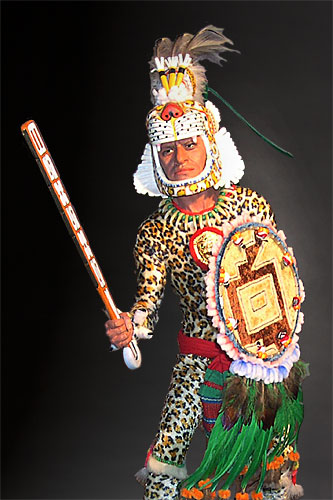
A likeness of an Aztec Jaguar Warrior by artist and historian George S. Stuart created from drawings in the Codex Magliabechiano.

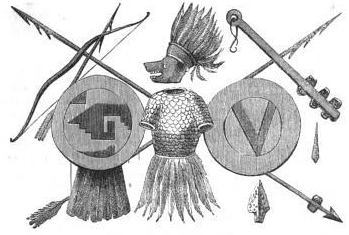
Aztec warrior dress and weapons

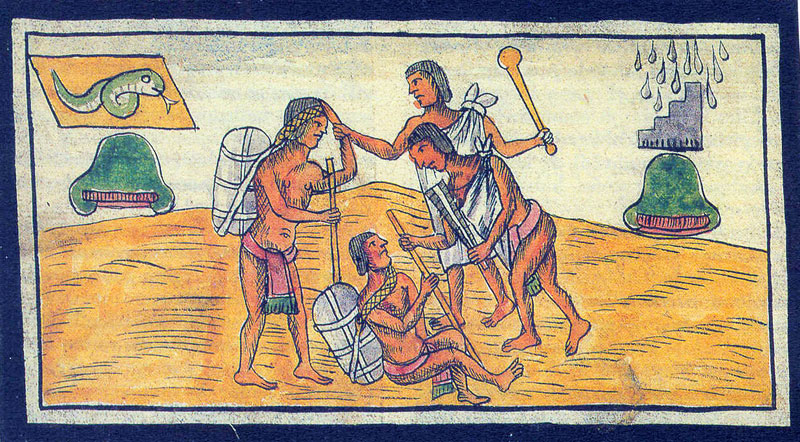
A representation of a Quauholōlli from the Codex Duran

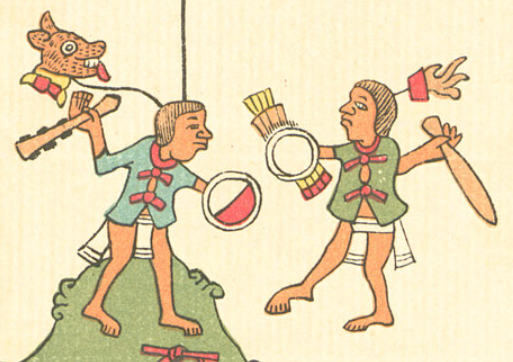
Representation of a Cuahuitl, Codex Telleriano-Remensis pg.34.

Mācuahuitl: (lit. "hand-wood", or "wood at hand") This weapon was supposed to represent the Aztec God Tezcatlipoca. Essentially a wooden sword with sharp obsidian blades embedded into its sides (similar in appearance and build to a modern cricket bat). This was the standard armament of the elite cadres. Also known in Spanish by the Taino word "macana". A blow from such a weapon was reputedly capable of decapitating a horse.

Cuahuitl: (Lit. "wood") A baton made out of hardwood (more than likely oak), reminiscent of the agave plant's leaves in its shape.

Tepoztōpīlli: Wooden spear with a broad head edged with sharp obsidian blades.

Quauholōlli: A mace-like weapon, the handle was made out of wood topped with a wooden, rock, or copper ball or sphere.

Tlāximaltepōztli: This weapon was meant to represent the Aztec God Tepoztecatl. Basically an axe, comparable to a tomahawk, the head of which was made out of either stone, copper or bronze and had a two side design, one side had a sharp bladed edge while the other one a blunt protrusion.

Mācuāhuitzōctli: A club about 1.64 feet (50 cm) long, with a knob on each of its four sides and a pointed tip.

Huitzauhqui: This weapon was meant to represent the Aztec God Huitzilopochtli. A wooden club, somewhat resembling a baseball bat. This weapon was used for melee attacks just as it was made, but other designs were studded with flint or obsidian cutting elements on its sides.

Tecpatl: This weapon was meant to represent the Aztec God Xiuhtecuhtli. A dagger with a double sided blade made out of flint or obsidian with an elaborate stone or wooden handle, 7 to 9 inches (18 to 23 cm) overall in length. Although this would have been an effective side arm, this weapon was more commonly used in Aztec sacrifice ceremonies which may point to it being wielded mostly by Aztec warrior priests.

=== Armor ===
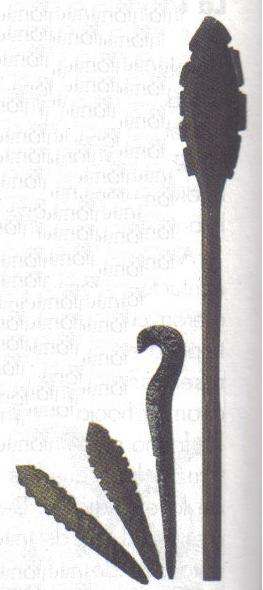
Modern replicas of Aztec weapons.

Chīmalli: Shields made with different materials such as the wooden shield "cuauhchimalli" or maize cane "otlachimalli". There were also ornamental shields decorated with motifs made in featherwork, these were called māhuizzoh chimalli.

Ichcahuīpīlli: Quilted cotton armor which was soaked in salt water brine and then hung to dry in shade so that the salt would crystallize inside of it. One or two fingers thick, this material was resistant to obsidian swords and atlatl darts.

Ēhuatl: (lit. "skin") The tunic that some noble warriors wore over their cotton armour or tlahuiztli, known in Spanish as tilma.

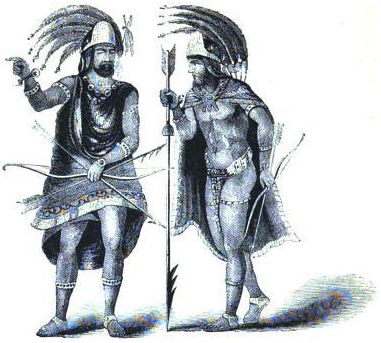
Aztec warrior dress and weapons

Tlahuiztli: The distinctively decorated suits of prestigious warriors and members of warrior societies. These suits served as a way to identify warriors according to their achievements in battle as well as rank, alliance, and social status like priesthood or nobility. Usually made to work as a single piece of clothing with an opening in the back, they covered the entire torso and most of the extremities of a warrior, and offered added protection to the wearer. Made with elements of animal hide, leather, and cotton, the tlahuiztli was most effective by enhancing the Ichcahuipilli.

Cuacalalatli: The Aztec war helmet, carved out of hardwood. Shaped to represent different animals like howler monkeys, predatory cats, birds, coyotes, or Aztec deities. These helmets protected most of a warriors head down to the jawline, the design allowed the warrior to see through the animal's open jaw and they were decorated according to the wearer's tlahuiztli.

Pāmitl: The identifying emblems that officers and members of prestigious warrior societies wore on their backs. Similar to the Japanese sashimono. These were frequently unique to their wearers, and were meant to identify the warrior at a distance. These banners allowed officers to coordinate the movement of their units.

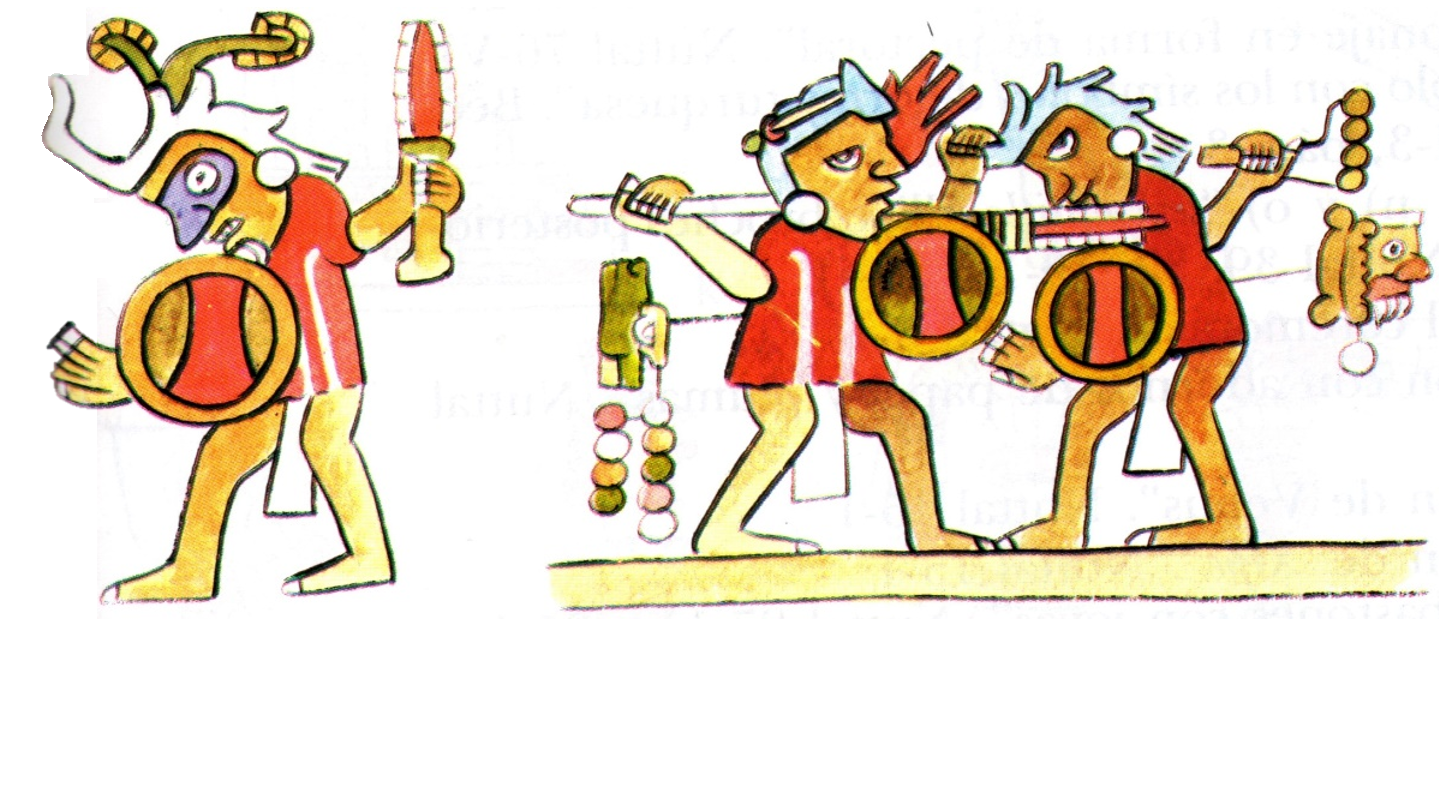
Mixtec warriors carrying red ichcahuipillis, curved tepoztli, chimalli, tepoztopilli and macuahuitl.

== Campaigns and battles ==
Once the decision of going to war was made, the news was proclaimed in the plazas calling for mobilization of the army for several days or weeks in advance. When the troops were ready and any allied cities had been alerted and had given their consent to partake in the campaign, the march began. Usually the first to march were the priests carrying the effigies. The next day the nobles marched, led by the Tlacochcalcatl and Tlacateccatl. And on the third day, the main bulk of the army set out, with the Tenochca marching first, followed by the warriors from the other cities in the alliance (Tepanecas and Texcocas), and lastly the allied forces from other cities. Some of these subject cities would also join in gradually during the march as the army passed by their cities. Thanks to the efficient system of roads maintained throughout central Mexico, the army marched an estimated average of 19–32 kilometers per day. The size of the Aztec army varied considerably from small contingents of a few thousand warriors to large armies with tens to hundreds of thousands of warriors. In the war against Coixtlahuacan, the Aztec army numbered 200,000 warriors and 100,000 porters. In 1506, an Aztec army numbering 400,000 men conquered Tututepec, a Mixtec kingdom.

=== Combat ===
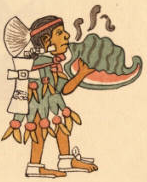
This is a conch shell trumpeter or quiquizoani.

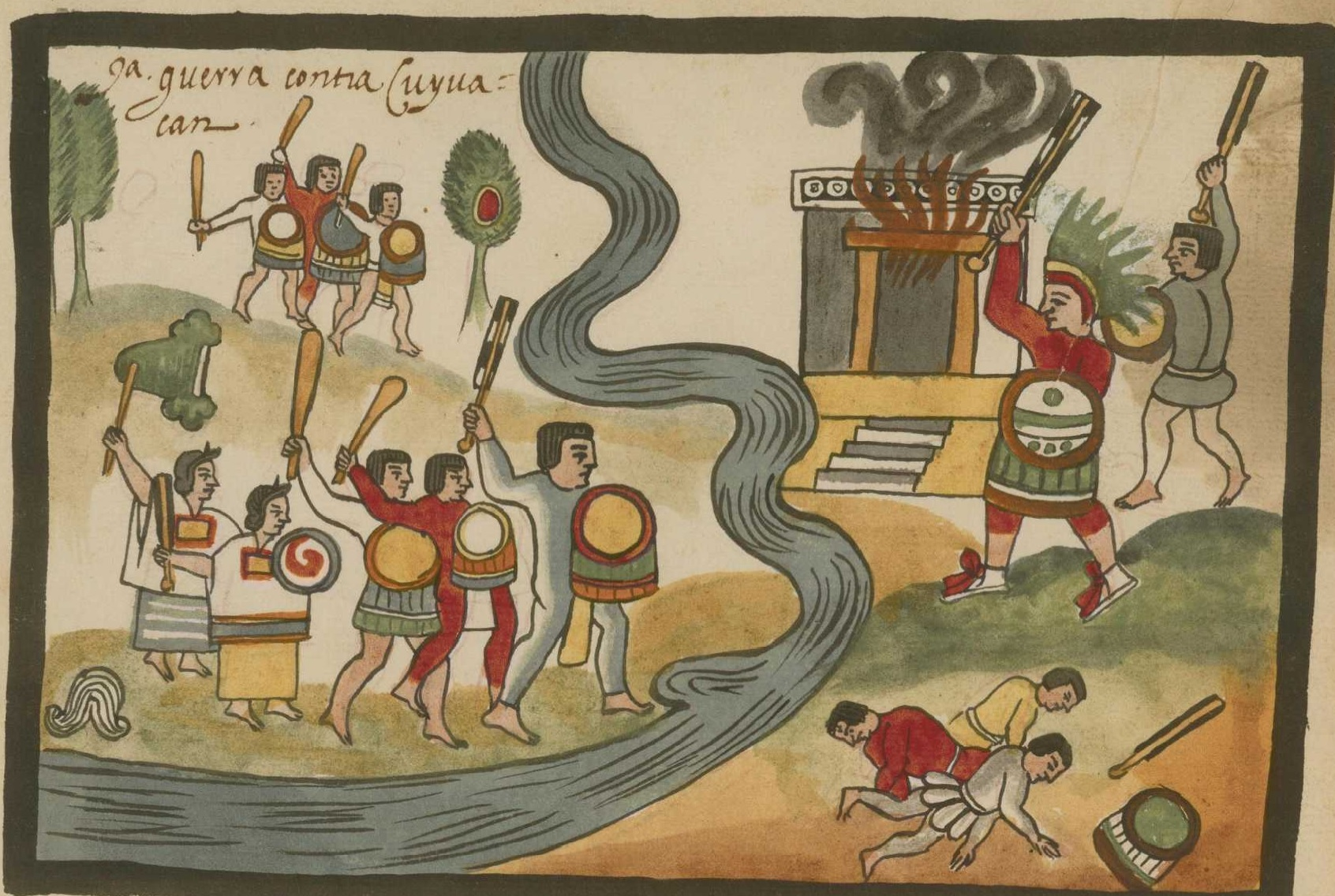
This page from the Codex Tovar depicts the burning of a temple from an annexed city.

Battles (sometimes called in Nahuatl by the metaphorical diphrasism ātl tlachinolli [aːt͡ɬ t͡ɬat͡ʃiˈnolːi] – literally "water fire") usually started at dawn but sometimes during the middle of the day – smoke signals were used to show that a battle was beginning and to coordinate attacks between different divisions of the army. The signal to attack was given by the drums (Teponaztli) and the conch shell trumpet (quiquiztli) blown by the trumpeter. Usually, the battle began with projectile fire – the bulk of the army was composed of commoners often armed with bows or slings. Then the warriors advanced into melee combat and during this phase, the atlatl was used – this missile weapon was more effective over shorter distances than slings and bows, and much more lethal. The first warriors to enter into melee were the most distinguished warriors of the Cuachicque and the Otontin societies; then came the Eagles and Jaguars, and lastly the commoners and unpracticed youths. Until entering into melee order rank was maintained and the Aztecs would try to surround or outflank the enemy, but once the melee began the ranks dissolved into a fray of individual hand-to-hand fighting. Youths participating in battle for the first time would usually not be allowed to fight before the Aztec victory was ensured, after which they would try to capture prisoners from the fleeing enemy. It is said that, particularly during flower wars, Aztec warriors would try to capture rather than kill their foes, sometimes striving to cut a hamstring or otherwise incapacitate their opponents. This has been used as an argument to explain the defeat of the Aztecs by the Spanish but this argument has been rejected by many historians – since sources clearly state that Aztecs did kill their Spanish opponents whenever they had the chance, and quickly adapted their combat strategies to their new opponents. Other Aztec tactical maneuvers included feigned retreats and ambushes where small portions of Aztec forces would attack and then fall back and lure the enemy into a trap where many more warriors were hidden in the terrain. If a defending enemy retreated into their city the battle was continued there – but normally the objective was to conquer a city rather than destroy it. Once the city was conquered the main temple would be set on fire signaling far and wide, to all concerned, the Aztec victory. If enemies still refused to surrender the rest of the city could be burned as well, but this was uncommon.

=== Gladiatorial combat ===
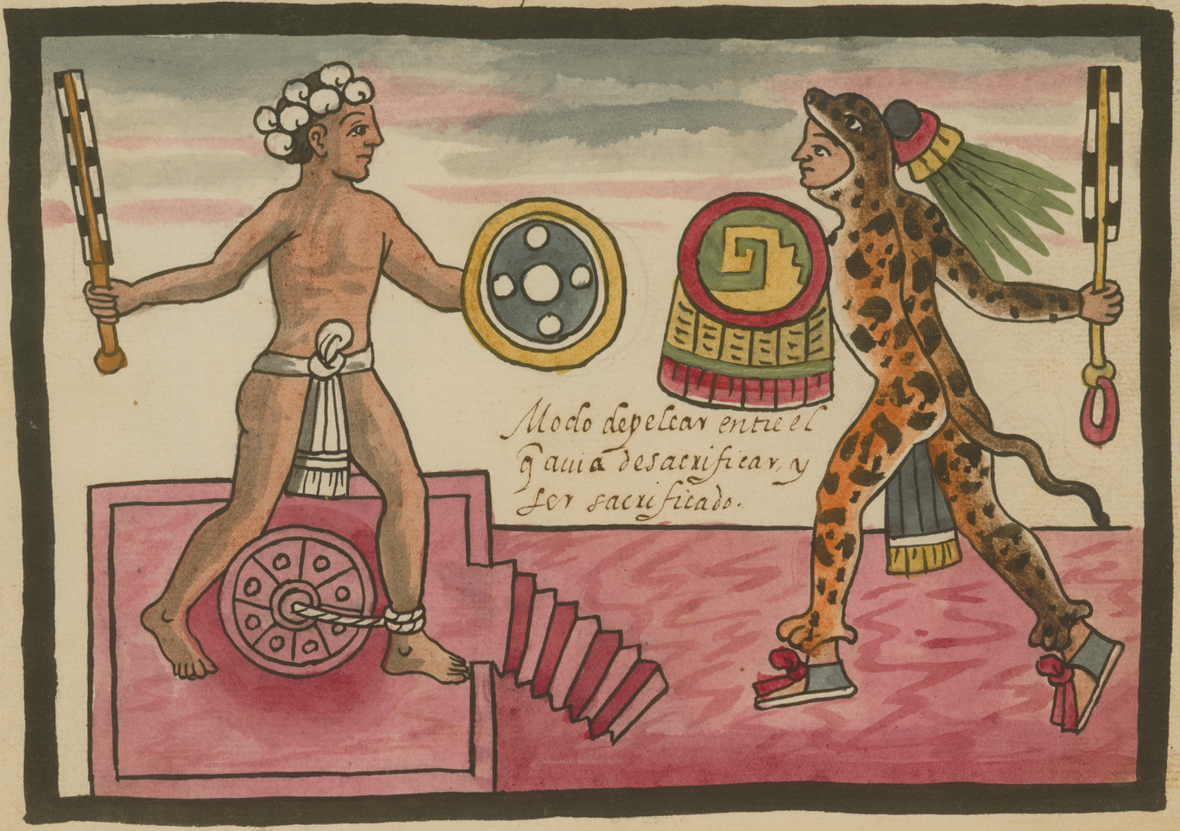
This page from the Codex Tovar depicts a scene of gladiatorial sacrificial rite, celebrated on the festival of Tlacaxipehualiztli (Feast of the Flaying of Men).

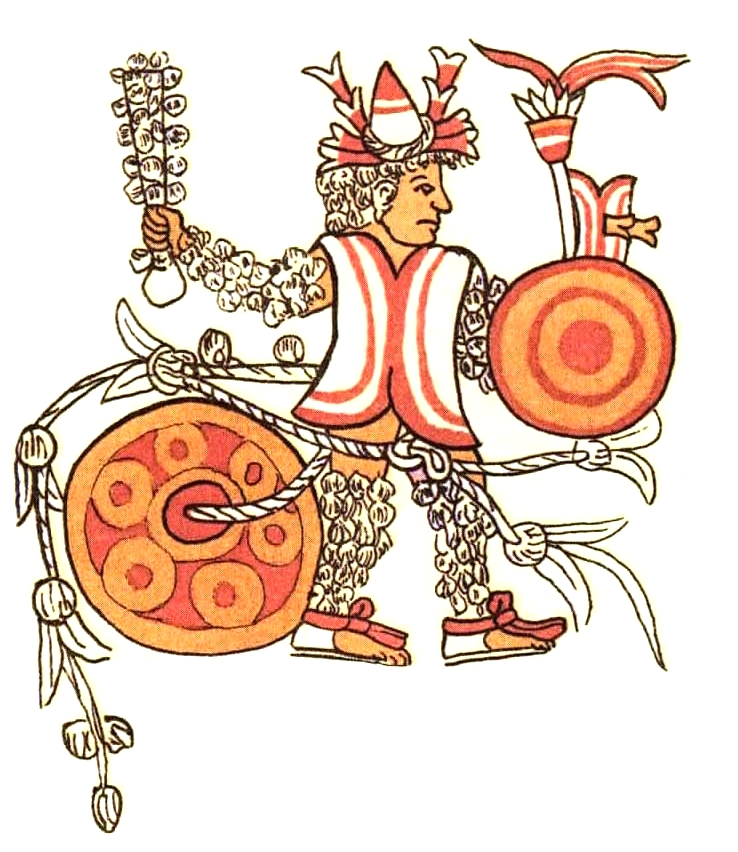
Victim of sacrificial gladiatorial combat, from Codex Magliabechiano. Note that he is tied to a large stone and his macuahuitl (sword/club) is covered with what appears to be feathers instead of obsidian.

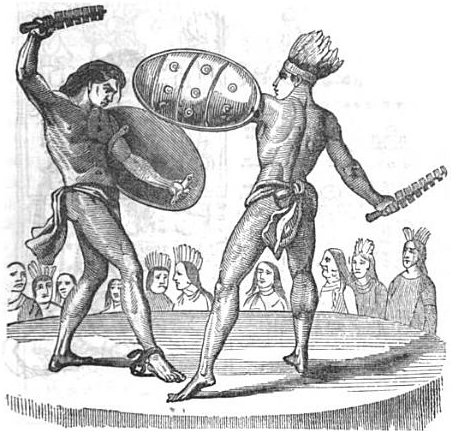
Victims of sacrificial gladiatorial combat had one leg chained to the ground and they had to fight a "succession of champions". If they were victorious, they were freed. If they were defeated, they were killed.

Some captives were sacrificed to Tonatiuh in ritual gladiatorial combat (as was the case of the famous warrior Tlahuicole). In this rite, the victim was tethered in place to a large carved circular "stone" (temalacatl) and given a mock weapon. The captive, sometimes with one arm tied behind their back or purposefully injured, was supposed to die fighting against up to four or seven fully armed jaguar and eagle knights, whereupon falling he would be promptly disemboweled by a priest, but if the captive survived he was granted freedom.

== Spanish eyewitness description of Aztec warriors ==
It is one of the most beautiful sights in the world to see them in their battle array because they keep formation wonderfully and are very handsome. Among them are extraordinarily brave men who face death with absolute determination. I saw one of them defend himself courageously against two swift horses, and another against three and four, and when the Spanish horseman could not kill him one of the horsemen in desperation hurled his lance, which the Aztec caught in the air, and fought with him for more than an hour until two-foot soldiers approached and wounded him with two or three arrows. He turned on one of the soldiers but the other grasped him from behind and stabbed him. During combat, they sing and dance and sometimes give the wildest shouts and whistles imaginable, especially when they know they have the advantage. Anyone facing them for the first can be terrified by their screams and their ferocity.

== Death and burial ==
Death was an essential part of Aztec culture from sacrifice to burial. Warriors were especially a part of this cycle and cultural aspect. When a warrior died either from battle or sacrifice, a ceremony was involved. Captured warriors would be sacrificed to the sun god and in some cases, the warrior would do the sacrifice. If a warrior died in battle his corpse would be burned there on the battlefield rather than at his city-state. An arrow from the fallen warrior on the battlefield would be brought back, dressed in the Sun god insignia and burned, which is curious since arrows were little-used weapons in Mexica armies.

It was believed by the Aztecs that the same place for the afterlife of warriors was also the place for women who died during childbirth. Mourning for fallen warriors was a long and sacred process. The mourners would not bathe and groom themselves for eighty days, believing this allowed time for the fallen warrior's soul to reach the Sky of the Sun. Women had a unique role in the mourning of their dead husbands. These women would carry the cloaks of their dead husbands around with them wherever they would go. They would also let down their hair and dance in lament to the sound of beating drums. Sons would also mourn for their dead fathers. They would carry around a small box which contained the jewelry and earplugs from his father. If an eagle warrior died their burial would be in the eagle warrior hall. They would be cremated and placed in the hall. In addition to their cremated bodies, they would be buried with jewelry, jaguar clays, and gold artifacts.

== See also ==
- Spanish conquest of the Aztec Empire
- Maya warfare
- Muisca warfare
- Inca warfare
- Indian auxiliaries

== Bibliography ==
- Carrasco, Pedro. “The Civil-Religious Hierarchy in Mesoamerican Communities: Pre-Spanish Background and Colonial Development.” American Anthropologist, vol. 63, no. 3, 1961, pp. 483–497. JSTOR 667723
- Clendinnen, Inga. “The Cost of Courage in Aztec Society.” Past & Present, no. 107, 1985, pp. 44–89. JSTOR 650706
- Hicks, Frederic. “‘Flowery War’ in Aztec History.” American Ethnologist, vol. 6, no. 1, 1979, pp. 87–92. JSTOR 643386
