= Indian weapons =

Indian weapons may refer to:

- Native American weaponry
- Weapons of India, see Indian martial arts and Military history of India
