= Tlacateccatl =

Aztec Military Rank

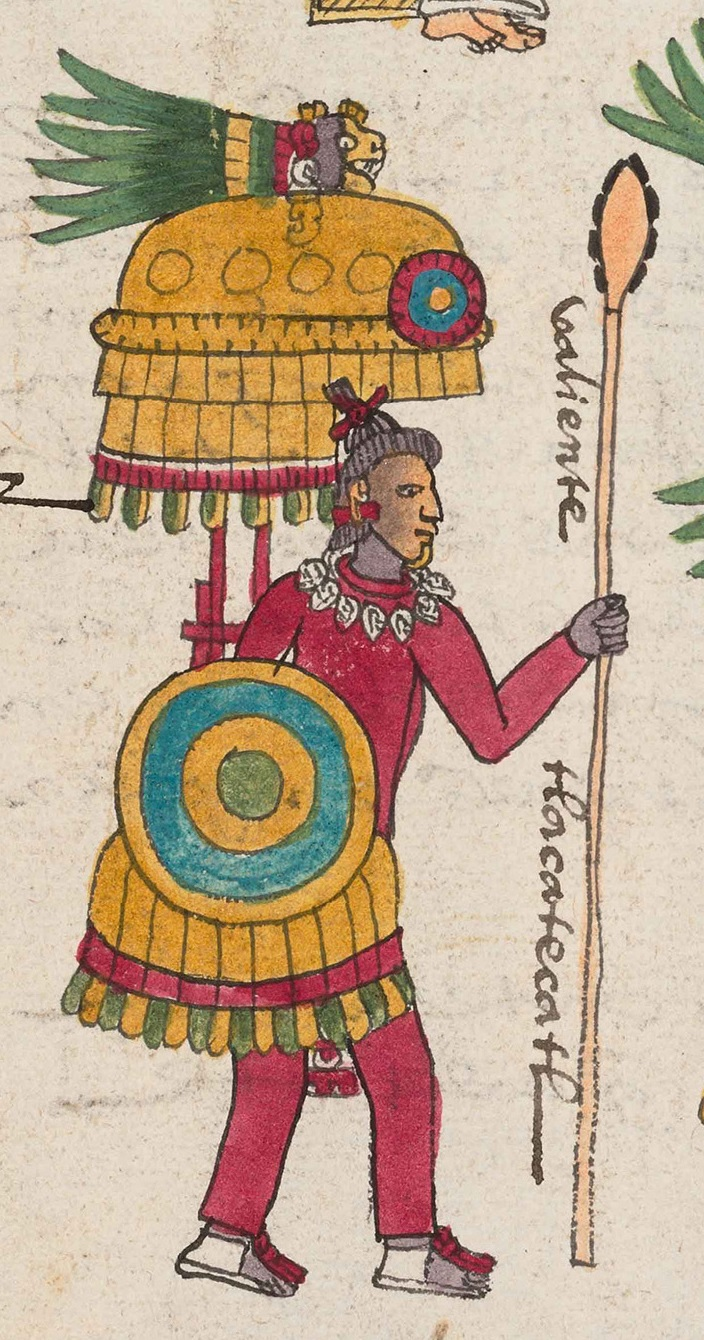
A tlacateccatl pictured in the Codex Mendoza (folio 67 recto). He is brandishing a shield (chimalli) and a lance (tepoztopilli), wears dyed cotton armour, and has a banner (pamitl) on his back

In the Aztec military, tlacateccatl (pronounced [t͡ɬaːkaˈteːkkat͡ɬ]) was a title roughly equivalent to general. The tlacateccatl was in charge of the tlacatecco, a military quarter in the center of the Aztec capital, Tenochtitlan. In wartime he was second-in-command to the tlatoani ("ruler", "king") and the tlacochcalcatl ("high general"). The tlacateccatl was always a member of the military order of the Cuachicqueh, "the shorn ones".

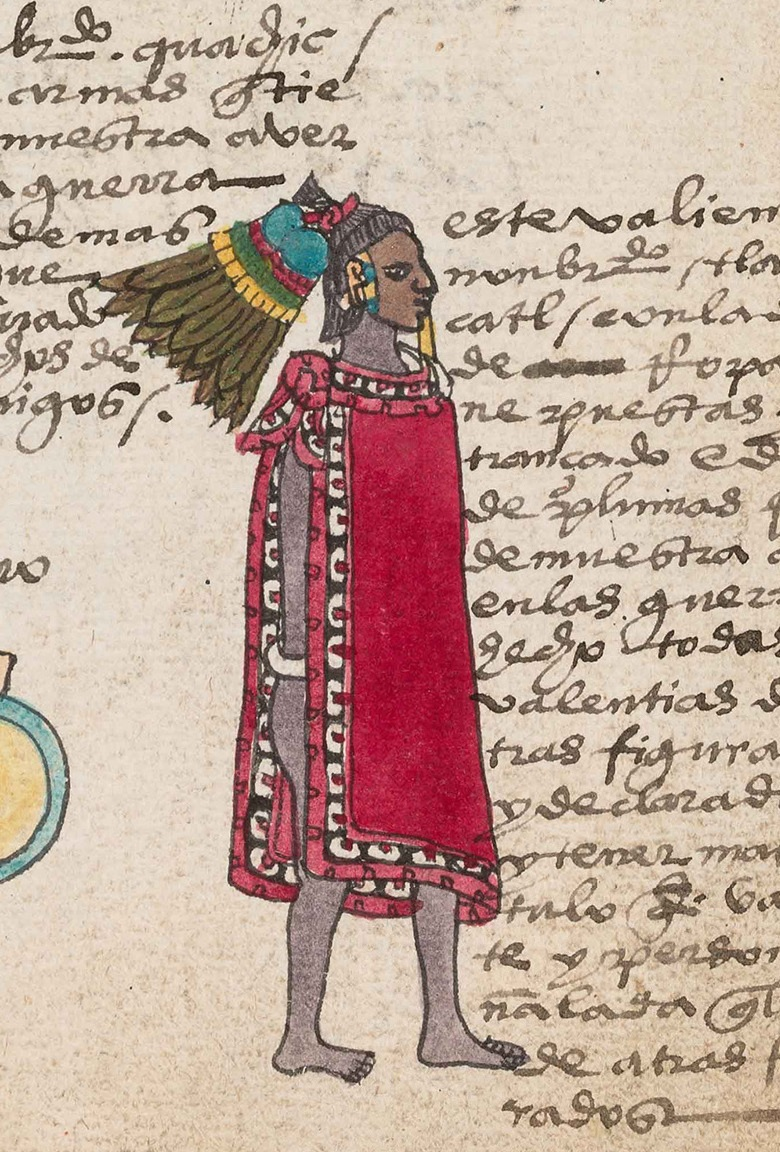
A tlacateccatl in a red cape from the Codex Mendoza.
