= Native American weaponry =

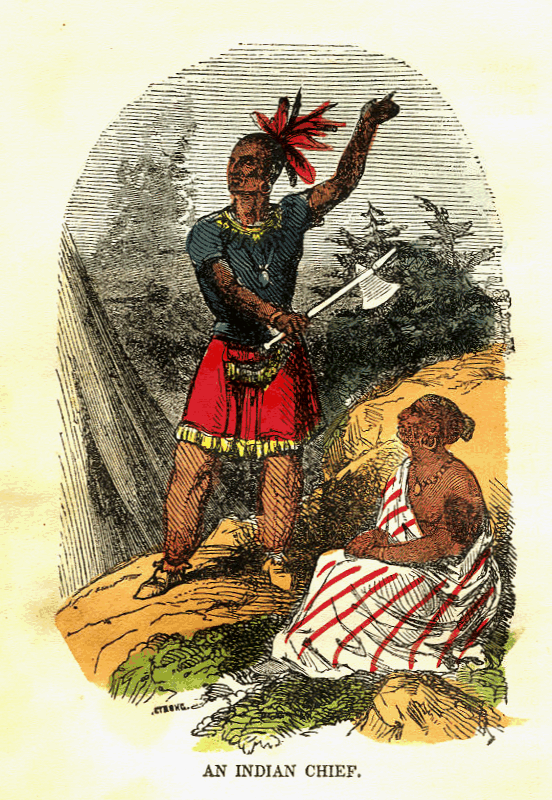
A Native American chief holding a war hatchet

Native American weaponry was used by Native American warriors to hunt and to do battle with other Native American tribes and Europeans.

== Weaponry in North America ==
Weaponry for Native American groups residing in North America can be grouped into five categories: striking weapons, cutting weapons, piercing weapons, defensive weapons, and symbolic weapons. The weaponry varied with proximity to European colonies, with tribes nearer those colonies likelier to have knives and tomahawks with metal components.

=== Striking weapons ===
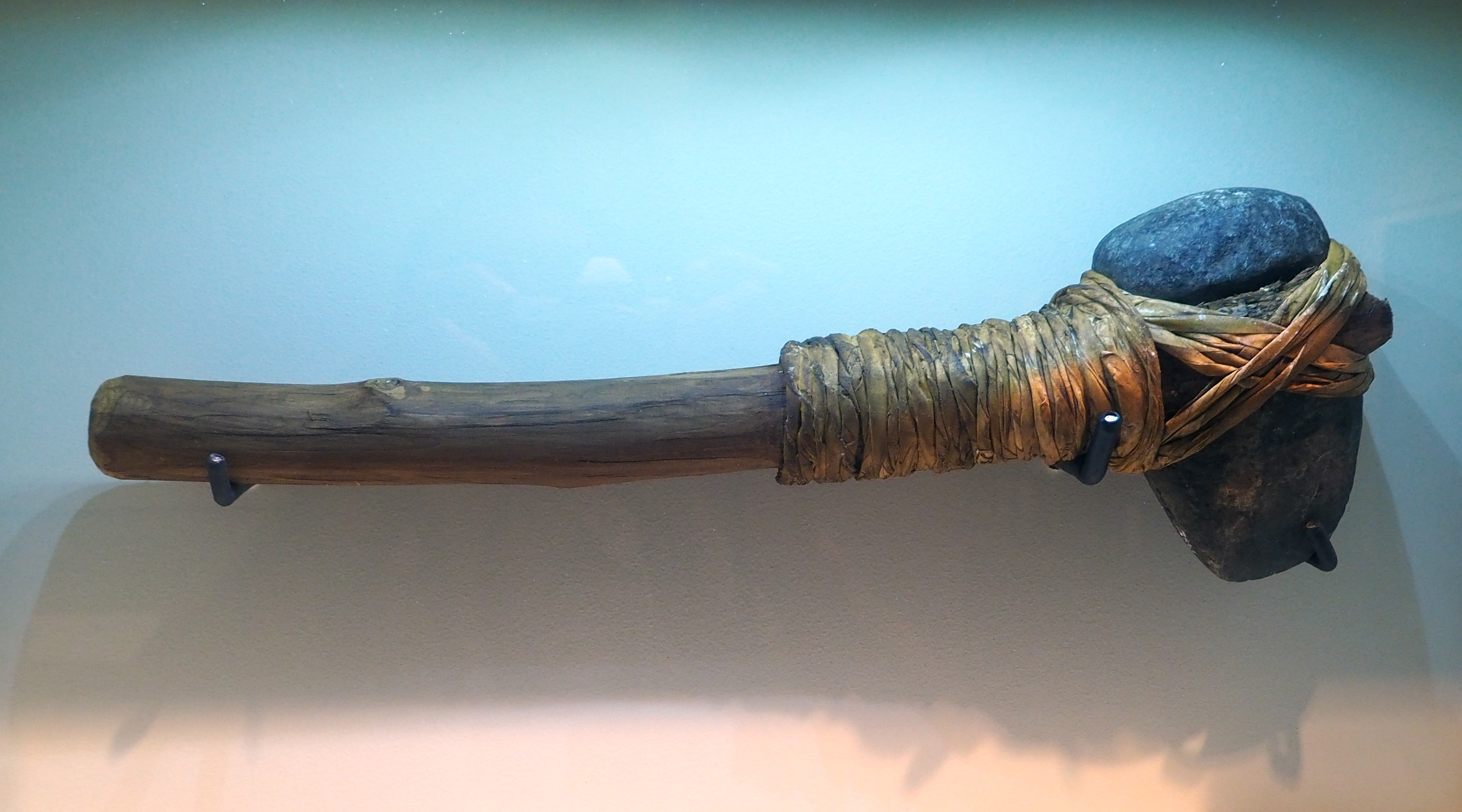
Stone club, Old Fort Niagara, New York

Native Americans used many variations of striking weapons. These weapons were mainly used for melee combat with other tribes. In some cases, these weapons were thrown for long-range attacks.

- Stone clubs, or casse-tête, were made from a stone attached to a wooden handle. There were also variations of stone clubs where tribes would carve the club out of a solid piece of stone. The most common stone types that were used for stone clubs were chert and flint. There are indications that most of these solid stone clubs were used for ceremonial purposes, instead of actual battle.
- Wooden clubs were commonly used by the woodland tribes. The clubs were carved from a solid piece of hardwood, like the wood from maple or oak. The earlier forms of wooden clubs were carved in the form of a ball at the end of a handle, but later forms were sometimes sharpened, resembling a wooden sword. Some forms had a sharp stone shard driven into the end of the club, almost like an axe.
- The gunstock war club was mostly made from wood, but had a metal blade attached to the end of the club, like a spear point. The club was shaped like the stock of an 18th-century musket. The design of these gunstock clubs was directly influenced by the firearms that the European settlers used. Two popular theories for creating clubs in these shapes are that the Native Americans were impressed with how well the settlers used the ends of their firearms as striking weapons or they wanted to intimidate other tribes by giving the impression that they had firearms of their own.

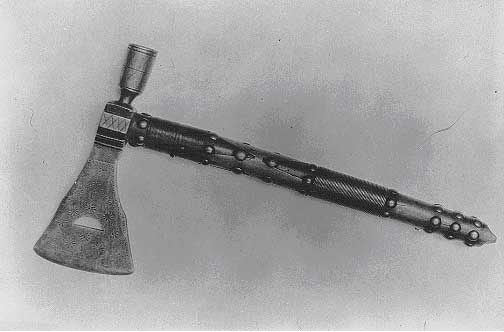
A pipe tomahawk dating to the early 19th century

- The war hatchet is very similar in design to a battle axe and was influenced by the axes that the European settlers used. The hatchet consisted of a sharpened blade, made from iron or stone, attached to the end of a handle.
- The pipe tomahawk was a type of war hatchet that was also a smoking pipe. Tomahawks were used for close combat like most striking weapons but were also popular throwing weapons. The sharp edge was also used for skinning animals. With time, the pipe tomahawk became more ceremonial and was used more as a pipe than as a weapon.

English soldier and explorer Jonathan Carver described another striking weapon, the name of which he did not give, that, he said, was unique to the inhabitants of the Great Plains:

Having great plenty of horses, they always attack their enemies on horseback, and encumber themselves with no other weapon, than a stone of a middling size, curiously wrought, which they fasten by a string, about a yard and half long, to their right arms, a little above the elbow. These stones they conveniently carry in their hands till they reach their enemies, and then swinging them with great dexterity, as they ride full speed, never fail of doing execution.

=== Cutting weapons ===
Cutting weapons were used by the Native Americans for combat as well as hunting. Tribes in North America preferred shorter blades and did not use long cutting weapons like the swords that the Europeans used at the time.

- Knives were used as tools for hunting and other chores, like skinning animals. Knives consisted of a blade made of stone, bone, or deer antlers, fastened to a wooden handle. Later, Native American knives were also made from steel or iron, following the European settlers' weapon-making influences. Some tribes had already figured out the use of locally sourced copper and iron from meteorites and could fashion weapons out of these.

=== Piercing weapons ===
Piercing weapons consisted of both short and long-range weapons. They were used for hunting and combat.

- Spears were used by the Native Americans to thrust and strike their enemies or the animals they were hunting. The spears were made of a short blade or tip, made from stone, and attached to the end of a long wooden handle or shaft. Some variations did not even have a stone tip. Instead, the shaft was simply sharpened at one end. Spears could also be thrown as ranged weapons.
- Lances were very similar to spears, but were designed specifically for use on horseback. Lances had longer shafts and tips than spears. This gave the user further reach, allowing them to stab an enemy from the top of a horse.
- Atlatl, or spear-throwers, are long-range weapons that were used by Native Americans to throw spears, called darts, with power and accuracy. The Atlatl is made from a hollowed-out shaft with a cup at the end that holds a dart in place and propels it forward. The thrower's throwing arm is extended, allowing for more leverage than throwing with the hand. This allows the dart to be thrown with more velocity.
- Bows and arrows were used by most cultures around the world at some point or another and are at least 8,000 years old. The arrow is created, similar to a spear, from a small blade (arrow tip) attached to one end of a wooden shaft. Attached to the other end are feathers that help stabilize the arrow's flight. Overall, an arrow is much smaller and lighter than a spear. The bow is made of wood (attempts have been made at bone, but the bone has a low tensile strength and snaps easily when pressure is applied to the ends, "authentic bows" made of bone is a fairly common scam) string is made from either the dried, twisted, strung out, and twisted again intestines of animals, bundled horse hair, fibers from nettle, or certain types of sinew. It is then attached to each end of the wood.

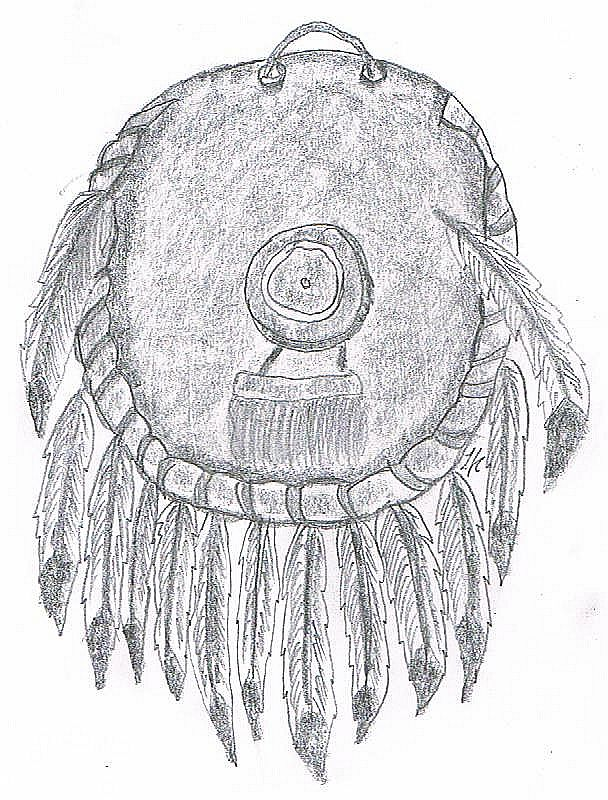
Medicine shield

=== Defensive weapons ===
Some Native American tribes carried shields into battle for extra protection. These shields were mostly made from leather stretched across a round wooden frame.

- War shields had the main purpose of stopping the smaller projectiles, such as arrows, and redirecting the larger projectiles such as spears. These shields were mostly carried by the men on horseback. These shields were made from buffalo neck leather and often had more than one layer of leather over one another.

=== Symbolic weapons ===
Many of the weapons that the Native Americans used served a more symbolic purpose.

- Medicine shields look similar to war shields. However, the medicine shield's purpose is to protect its carrier spiritually, rather than ward against physical attacks. Because these shields do not have to fend off physical attacks, they are built much thinner and lighter than the war shields. The medicine shields are often decorated with many symbols that represent the spiritual strength within the carrier.

== Weaponry in Mesoamerica and South America ==
Indigenous peoples in Mesoamerica and South America used many weapons similar to those in North America, including spears, bows and arrows, atlatl, clubs, daggers, and shields. However, several additional types of weapons were also used in combat.

=== Aztec weaponry ===
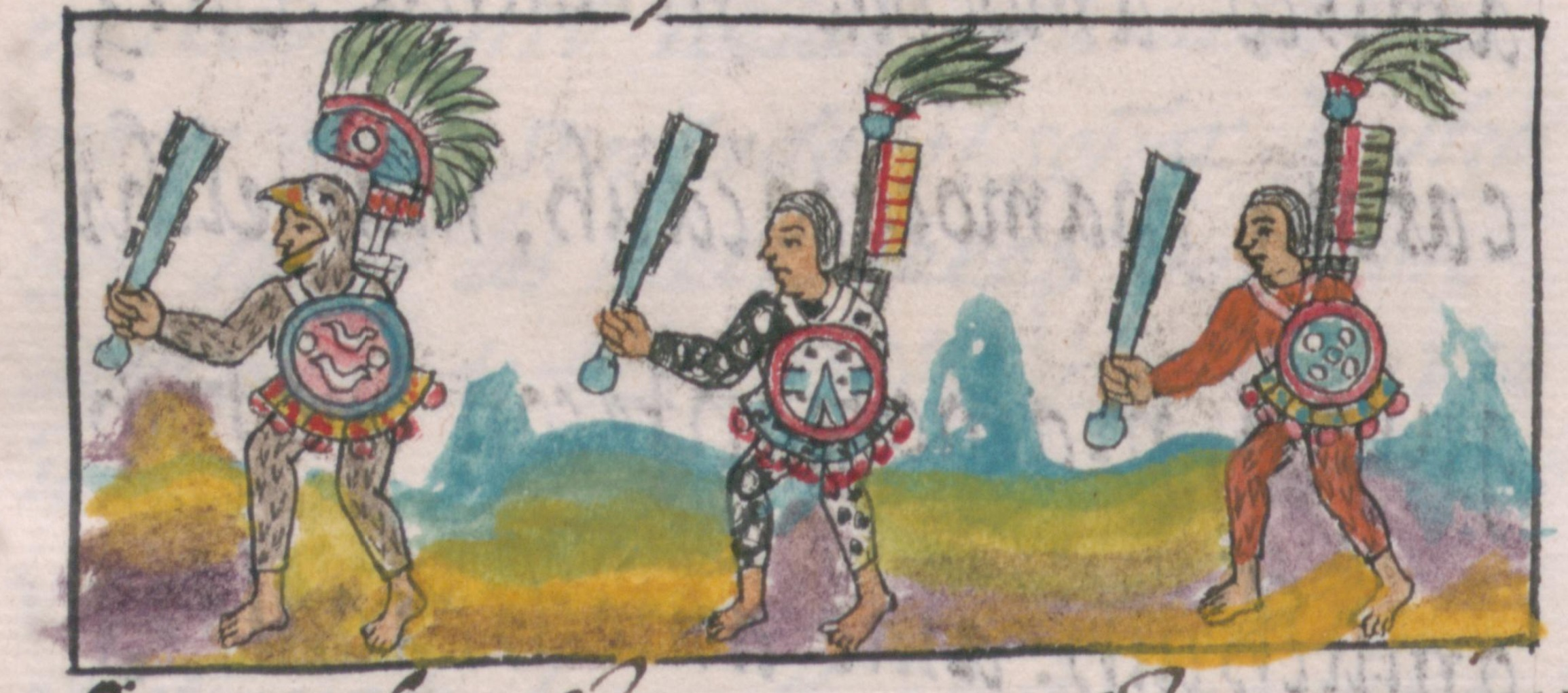
Aztec warriors, each holding a mācuahuitl, as depicted in the Florentine Codex (Vol. IX).

- Mācuahuitl: A flat wooden staff or club with obsidian blades embedded in the edges. These weapons could be used to inflict either cutting wounds (with the obsidian blades) or to club an opponent unconscious (with the flat side). It has been loosely compared to a European broadsword, although others have argued that it is a distinct weapon from either swords or clubs. Both single-handed and two-handed versions were used. According to Spanish conquistadors, the mācuahuitl was deadly enough to decapitate a man, or even a horse.
- Quauholōlli: A weapon similar to a mace, consisting of a hard ball attached to the end of a wooden stick.
- Ichcahuīpīlli: Thick, quilted armor consisting of cotton stitched between layers of cloth. The armor was designed to protect the wearer from blows from mācuahuitl or other clubs, as well as arrows and atlatl darts.

=== Inca weaponry ===
- Bolas (Quechua: Liwi): Weights mounted on the ends of interconnected cords. Used by the Inca army in battle.
- Slings (Quechua: Waraka): Slings were a fundamental long-distance weapon in the Inca army. They were typically constructed out of wool.

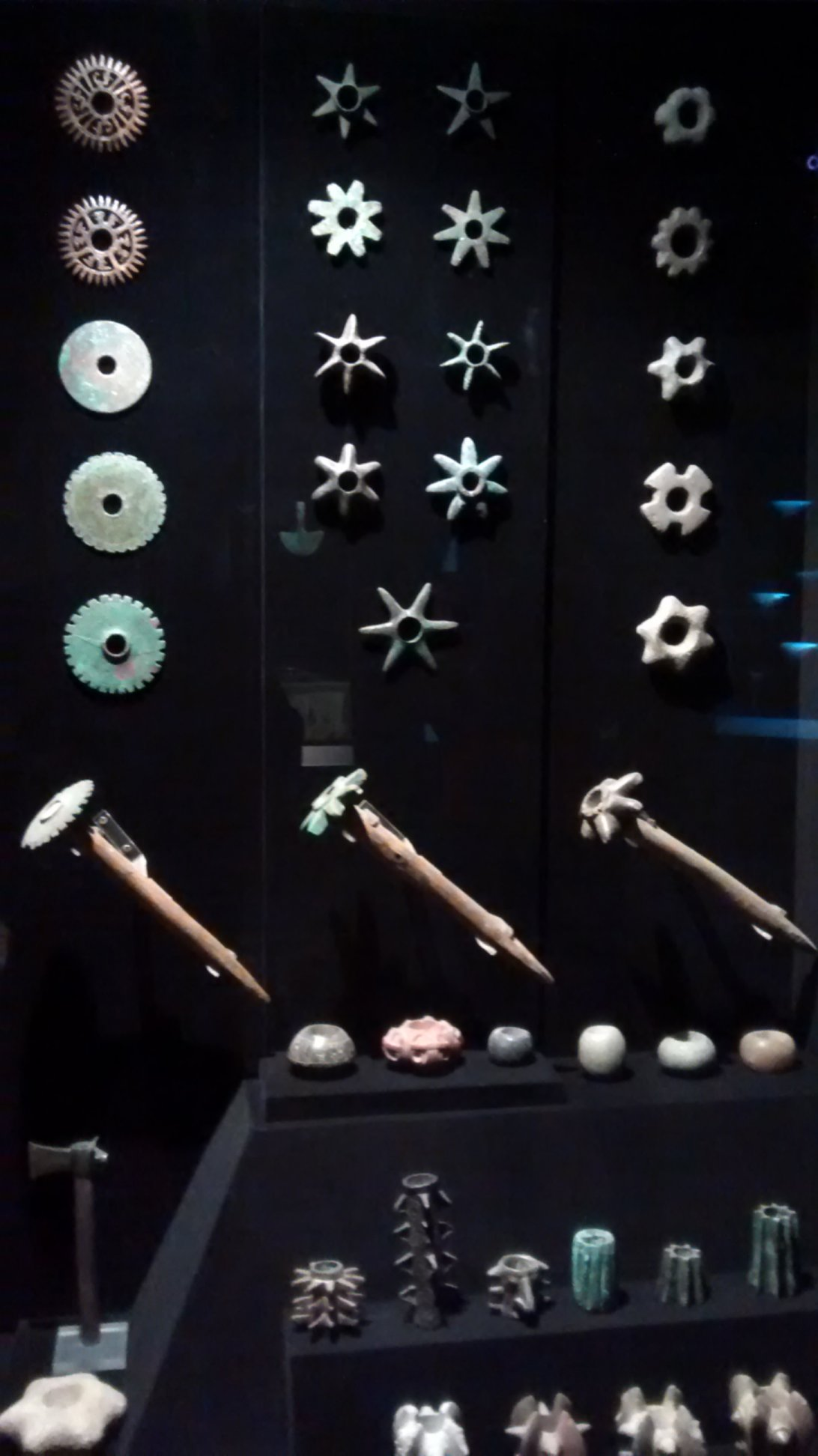
Examples of a variety of Incan maces.

- Maces (Quechua: Champi): Weapons consisting of a heavy object mounted on the end of a wooden shaft. The head of the mace was often star-shaped and made of copper or bronze.
