= Tlaximaltepoztli =

Tepoztli
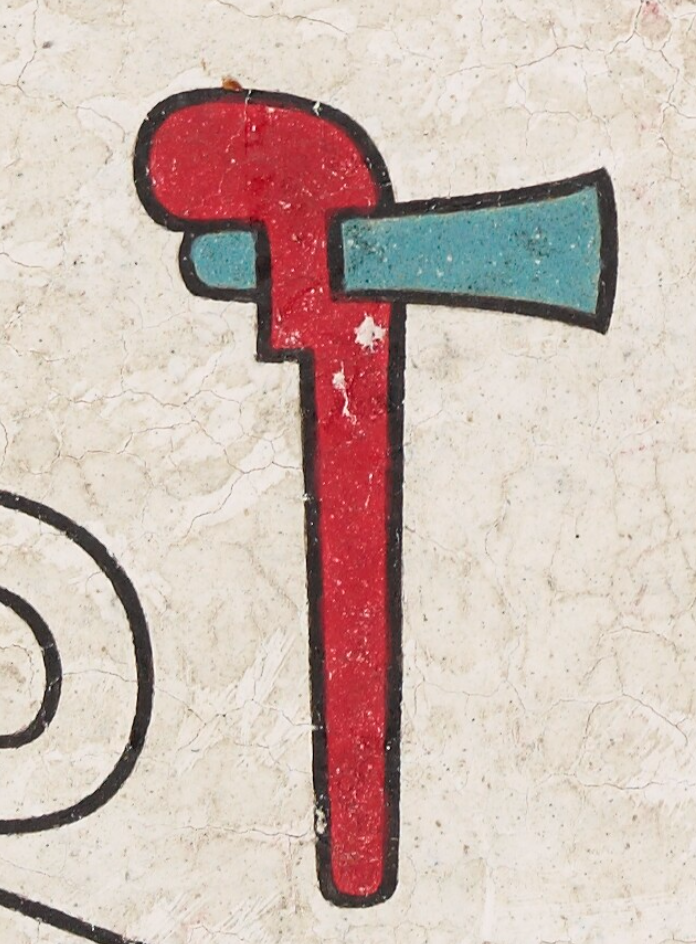
- Bronze axe from Mexica culture in the Codex Laud
- Type: Axe
- Place of origin: Mexico

Service history
- In service: Pre-classic to Post-Classic period (900–1570)
- Used by: Aztecs, Mayans, Purépecha, Mixtecs
- Wars: Spanish conquest of the Aztec Empire, Aztec expansionism, Mesoamerican Wars

Specifications
- Mass: 1.5–3.0 kg (3.3–6.6 lb)
- Length: 30–45 cm (12–18 in)
- Blade type: Curved, thick, single-edged, tapered
- Hilt type: Single-handed swept
- Scabbard/sheath: unknown
- Head type: Trapezoidal
- Haft type: Straight or Curved, of a single metallic piece or wooden

The tlaximaltepoztli (tlāximaltepoztli; in Nahuatl, tlaximal=carpentry and tepoztli=metal axe) or simply tepoztli was a common weapon used by civilizations from Mesoamerica which was formed by a wooden haft in which the poll of the bronze head was inlaid in a hole in the haft. It was used for war or as a tool. Its use is documented by the Codex Mendoza and the Codex Fejérváry-Mayer. Tax collectors from the Aztec Empire demanded this kind of axe as tribute from the subjugated kingdoms. In Aztec mythology, the tepoztli was used by the god Tepoztécatl, god of fermentation and fertility. In Codex Borgia he is represented with a bronze axe.

== Description ==
The tepoztli was a weapon used by several kingdoms in Mesoamerica, notably during the Spanish conquest of the Aztec Empire in the 16th century. It was famously employed by the Purépecha Empire, from which many original pieces have been discovered. Based on the size of the bronze axe heads exhibited by the National Anthropology Museum and images in the Codex Fejérváry-Mayer, the tepoztli is estimated to have been 1.3 to 3 ft (0.40 to 0.91 m) long and 1.5 in (38 mm) wide. Its design featured a hole in the shaft where the axe head was inserted and firmly attached using a natural adhesive made from pine tree sap and coal.

A decorative version of the tepoztli was the axe-monies, which were highly prized in the Late Postclassic period. However, these objects were ineffective in combat due to their small thickness and brittle or soft mechanical properties.

This weapon was also used as a tool for crafting wooden objects and was a common item in Aztec homes. Among commoners in Tenochtitlan, the axe formed part of the marriage dowry, being presented to the wife along with other household items.

Mesoamerican Bronze Axes

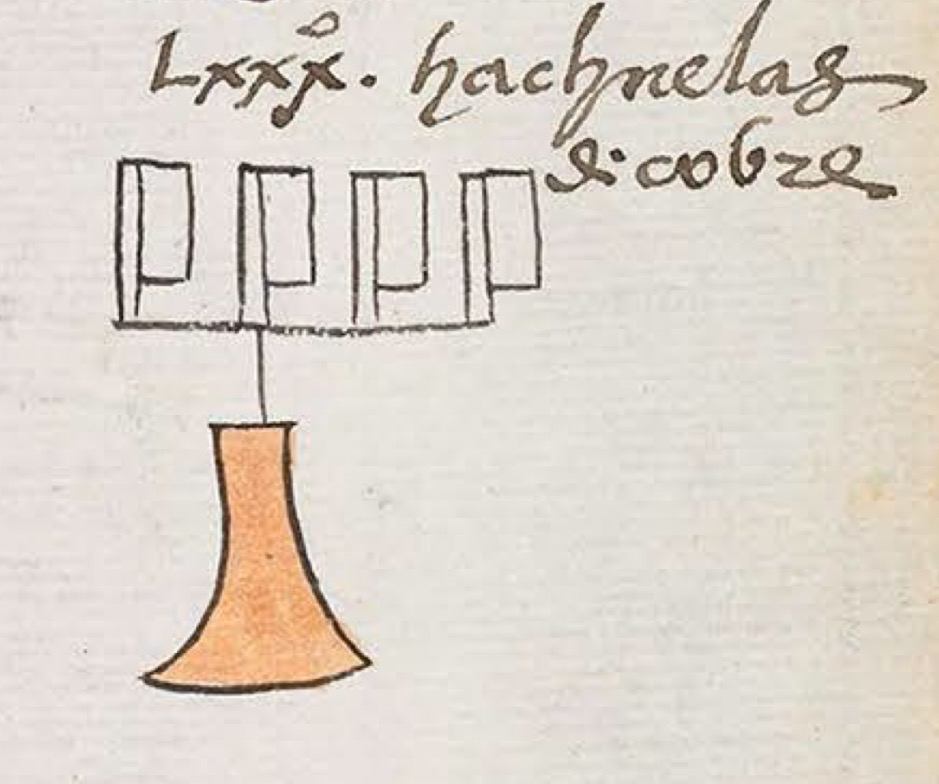
Codex Mendoza, old Spanish: "hachuelas d'cobre" (copper hatchets). Modern metallurgical studies classify most of the axes as bronze alloys

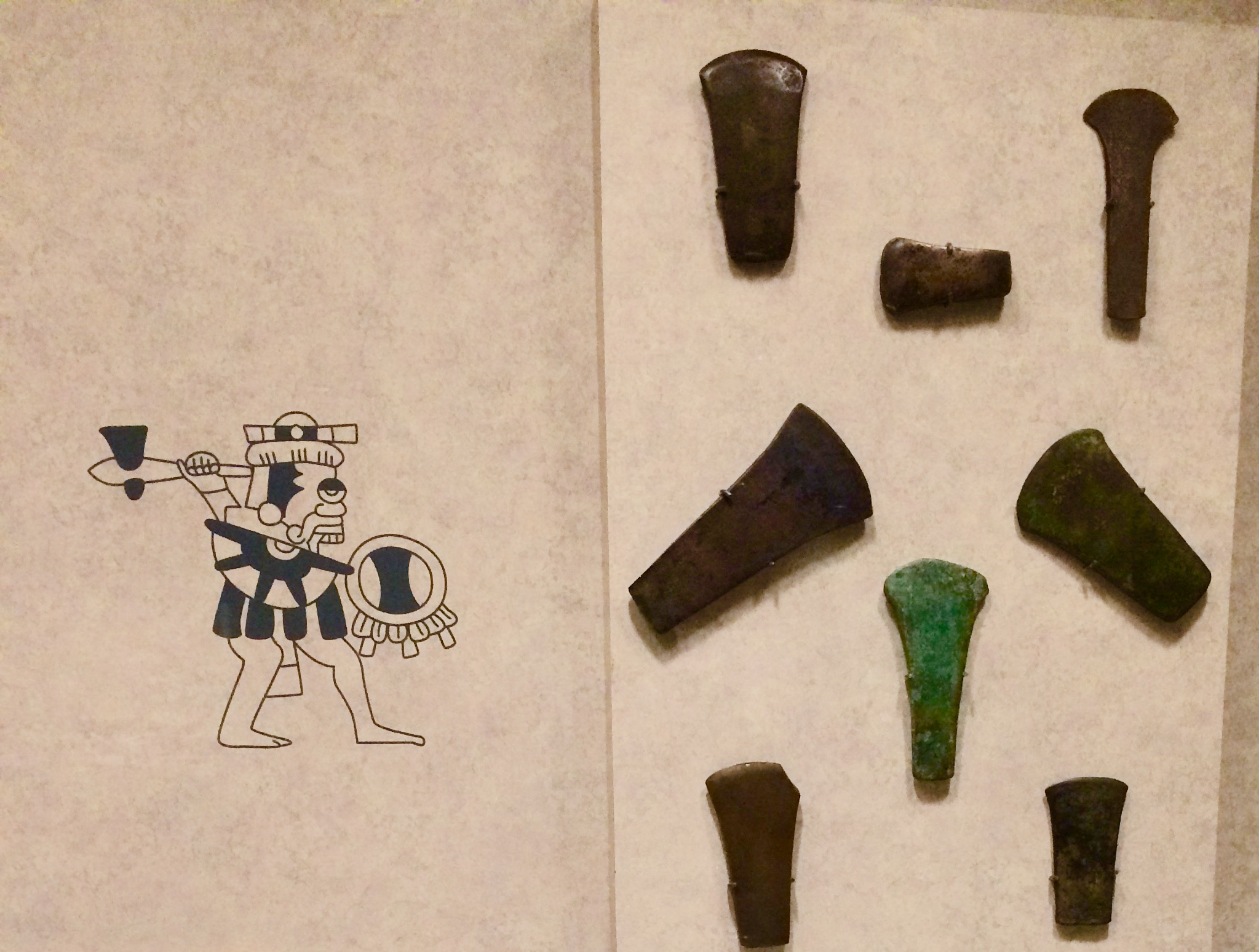
Photo of a set of Mesoamerican bronze axes displayed in the National Museum of Anthropology in Mexico City

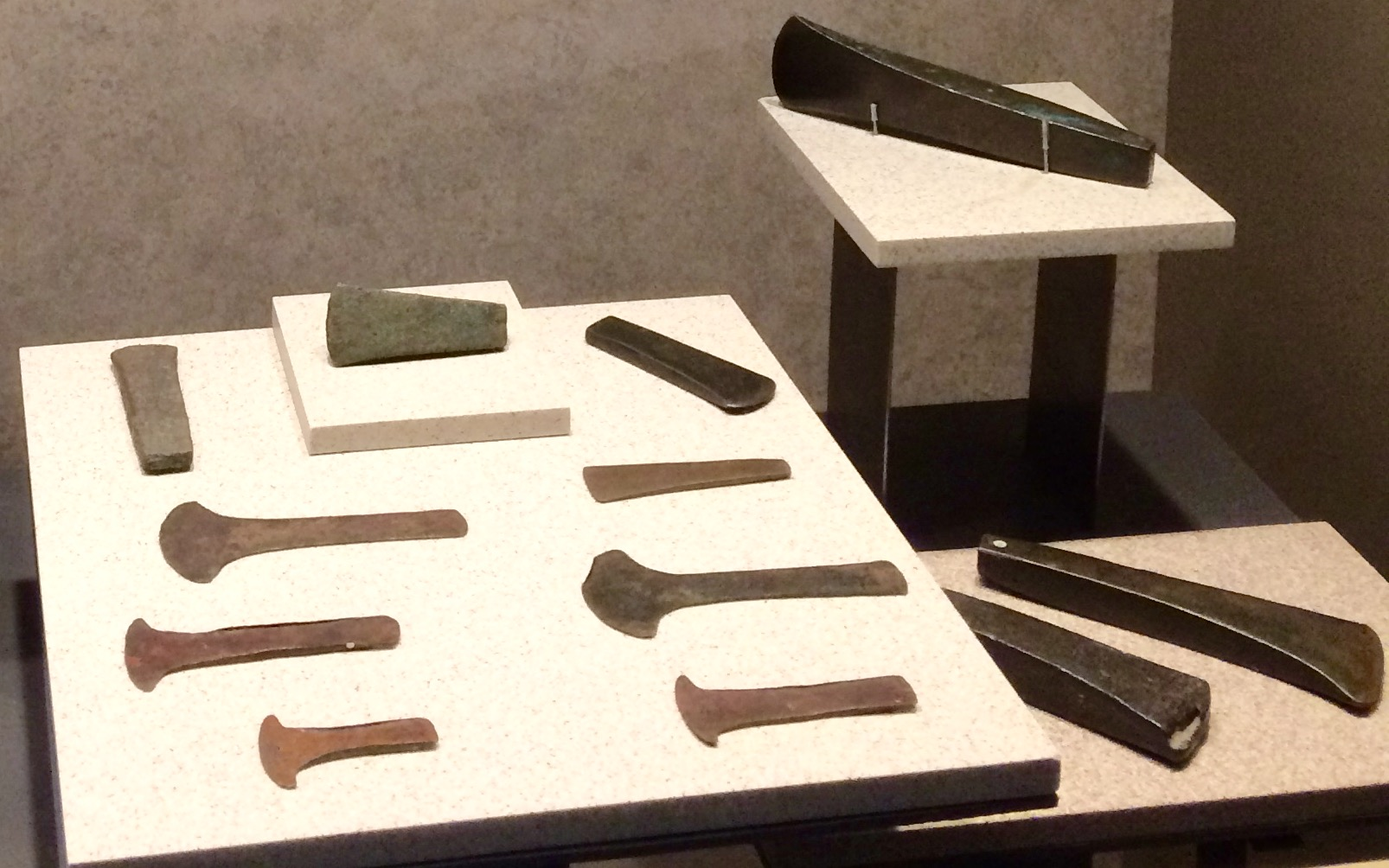
Photo of a second set of Mesoamerican bronze axes displayed in the National Museum of Anthropology in Mexico City

== Metallurgics ==
Mesoamerican axes were mostly made of bronze in the Post-classic period, with high Vickers Hardness values (VHN) ranging from 130 to 297 VHN in the bronze alloys. Only the old and more primitive Pre-classic copper axes the VHN value ranged from 80 to 135

Metallurgics were introduced in West Mexico via maritime trade during the Classic period, since most found objects are near the coast during this period. This technology seems to have been imported due to the League of Merchants that traded articles from as far south as Ecuador to the coast of Culiacán, Mexico. Ecuadorian and west Mexican objects show that not only were the artifacts were found in analogous archeological context, but they share identical chemical composition and manufacturing techniques, and their designs are very similar.

The grain size of the metallic alloy is variable along the body, showing intensive cold work by hammering in the edges. This cold work treatment increased the hardness of the axe in this important area, while leaving the rest of the structure more soft so it could resist the impacts of daily use.

Examples of HV values for various metals and Mesoamerican bronze-alloy axes
Material	Value
Cu-Sn Bronze	274HV
Cu-As-Sn Bronze	297HV
Cu-As Bronze	195HV
347L stainless steel	180HV
Iron	30–80HV

== Historical References ==
During the invasion of West Mexico, it was reported that locals built boats for Hernán Cortés with the help of axes. Also in the Lienzo de Jucutacato it is represented the migration of a metallurgical guild from the Golf coast to Uruapan.

"Tenían cierto azófar blanco con alguna mezcla de oro de que hacían hachuelas de fundición y unos cascavelazos con que bailaban. Este azófar y otras planchas o láminas más duras las traían a rescatar los de Tabasco por las cosas (de Yucatán que eran)". They had certain white brass with some mixture of gold which they made cast hatchets and big rattles which they used to dance. This brass and other plates or more strong metal sheets were recovered from Tabasco (they came from Yucatán)

— Diego de Landa, Relación de las cosas de Yucatán

== Origin and distribution ==
The tlaximaltepoztli was widely used in many regions of Mesoamerica since many different cultures were very specialized in metallurgics, they also used bronze for making tools in order to create stone sculptures and gravestones. Several copper alloy ore mines were to be found around the Purépecha state in what is now the Mexican state of Michoacan, such mines were also used by the Spanish during the New Spain rule. Bronze axes were also weapons of the Inca Empire and other civilizations of South America that were also used as weapons to dominate local kingdoms or to defend from foreign invasions.

== Popular culture ==
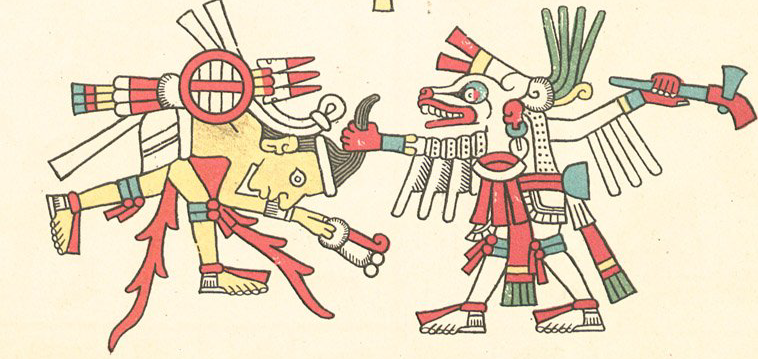
Codex Fejervary Mayer page 38. Depiction of two Aztec warriors, the warrior on the right is wielding a tlaximaltepoztli.

The bronze axe is mentioned in the Relación de Michoacán, in the story of the Purepecha's Princess Erendira, who resisted the Spanish invasion. In one part of the story, it is described how the local women started to dress the princess and gave her axes to cut firewood, in preparation for her wedding.

Also from the Relación de Michoacán, it is stated that a man who remarried was required to spend four days gathering wood beforehand as a kind of penance.

== See also ==
- Axe-monies
- Aztec warfare
- Purépecha culture
- Traditional metal working in Mexico
