= Tlamemeh =

Mesoamerican term for a human porter or laborer

Tlamemeh (plural tamemes) is a word that comes from the Nahuatl tlamama, meaning load. In Honduras and Mexico it means Indian laborer. The porters carried loads on their backs (which could be people, taxes, or items for trade).

In colonial times the tradition implied the servitude of the Indians, who in most cases became vassals of the Spanish which became widespread. Today, in Mexican Spanish, the word tameme is usually a derogatory connotation of "subordinate" that denotes the discrimination from the Indian that was consolidated in the new Colony of Spain.

== History ==
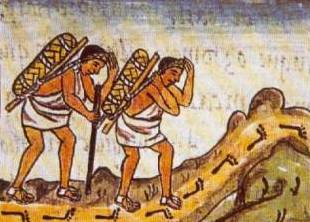
Tlamemeh according to the Florentine Codex

In pre-Hispanic Mexico, and generally throughout Mesoamerica, there was not any animal capable of being used in the loading and transport of goods and so manpower had to be used, this is how the "tameme" emerged. From the arrival of the Spanish in the area (first expeditions starting in 1493), they began to replace porters with animals such as horses carrying the conquerors, but horses were not specifically brought to be used for burden but for combat, so the porters were still widely used.

== Job characteristics ==
Miguel León-Portilla described tlamemes as "porters trained from childhood", from the class of commoners macehualtin, devoted exclusively to freight in the Aztec culture." They began to exercise since childhood, carrying on average 23 kilos and did a daily commute of 21 to 25 kilometers before being relieved.

With the Spanish conquest in 1521 the first domestic species of cargo animals arrived, but they continued to use tlamemes because of a lack of roads. They were considered of lower status in the social scale, only slightly higher than the simple soldiers of the Aztec military. Porters that were located on the outside of the markets or swap meets provided services transporting purchases, but the most important were the porters who served in the expeditions of the merchants.

Before leaving in each convoy, merchants carefully calculated the number of porters that would accompany them, taking into account the duration of the trip, the number of casualties possible in the course, etc. They carried all the goods that the merchants would sell on the trip, which often lasted for months. When the expedition reached a resting place, they were granted special attention through the night so they could recover from their strenuous efforts, in recognition of the value of their work. When they returned to base, the expedition porters were engaged in periods of rest, not acting in the tianguis (stores), or mingling with the other porters.

In remote areas or for economic reasons, this profession continues even today.

== Applications and tools ==
The porters used a "backstrap" in their work, which was a wide, thick leather strap with a mecate(cord) at each end that served to hold and keep the load stable to the back of the tlameme. In some, mecapales (textiles) and wood structures were used.

== Sources ==
- Sherman, William. Trabajo Forzado nativo en Siglo XVI América Central, University of Nebraska Press, Nebraska, 1979;
- Newson, Linda. La supervivencia de la India en Colonial Nicaragua, University of Oklahoma Press, Oklahoma, 1987;
- Barrantes, Ramiro. Evolución en el trópico. Los Amerindios de Costa Rica y Panamá, Editorial Universidad de Costa Rica, San José, 1993. Libro en línea: [1]
- Denevan, William, la población indígena de las Américas en 1492, la población indígena de las Américas en 1492, Madison, University of Wisconsin Press, Madison, 1992 (Edición Segunda).
