= Tlalcuahuitl =

Aztec unit of measurement

Tlalcuahuitl [t͡ɬaɬˈkʷawit͡ɬ] or land rod also known as a cuahuitl [ˈkʷawit͡ɬ] was an Aztec unit of measuring distance that was approximately 2.5 m (8.2 ft), 6 ft (1.8 m) to 8 ft (2.4 m) or 7.5 ft (2.3 m) long.

The abbreviation used for tlalcuahuitl is (T) and the unit square of a tlalcuahuitl is (T²).

== Subdivisions of tlalcuahuitl ==
Subdivisions of Tlalcuahuitl
Glyph	English	Nahuatl	IPA	Fraction of Tlalcuahuitl	Metric Equivalent where 1 T = 2.5 m
arrow glyph	arrow	cemmitl	[ˈsemmit͡ɬ]	1/2 T	1.25 m
arm glyph	arm	cemacolli	[semaˈkolːi]	1/3 T	0.83 m
bone glyph	bone	cemomitl	[seˈmomit͡ɬ]	1/5 T	0.5 m
heart glyph	heart	cenyollotli	[senjoˈlːot͡ɬi]	2/5 T	1.0 m
hand glyph	hand	cemmatl	[ˈsemmat͡ɬ]	3/5 T	1.5 m

== Acolhua Congruence Arithmetic ==
Using their knowledge of tlalcuahuitl, Barbara J. Williams of the Department of Geology at the University of Wisconsin and María del Carmen Jorge y Jorge of the Research Institute for Applied Mathematics and FENOMEC Systems at the National Autonomous University of Mexico believe the Aztecs used a special type of arithmetic. This arithmetic (tlapōhuallōtl [t͡ɬapoːˈwalːoːt͡ɬ]) the researchers called Acolhua [aˈkolwa] Congruence Arithmetic and it was used to calculate the area of Aztec people's land as demonstrated below:

Calculation Examples Yielding Acolhua Recorded Area
Field Id.	Side lengths a, b, c, d in (T)				Recorded Area (T²)	Calculated Area (T²)
Multiplication of two adjacent sides
1-207-31	20 + ht	19 + hd	20 + ht	19 + a	380	20 x 19 = 380
3-50-7	17	23	16	24	391	17 x 23 = 391
Average length of one pair of opposite sides times an adjacent side
4-27-16	42	12	40	11	451	11 x (42 +40)/2 = 11 x 41 = 451
5-12-2	52	21	56	13	884	52 x (21 + 13)/2 = 52 x 17 = 884
5-145-31	40	8	27	24	432	27 x (8 + 24)/2 = 27 x 16 = 432
Surveyors' Rule, A = (a + c)/2 x (b + d)/2
5-111-21	26	32	30	10	588	(26 + 30)/2 x (32 + 10)/2 = 28 x 21 = 588
5-46-4	23	15 + hd	25 + hd	11	312	(23 + 25)/2 + (15 + 11)/2 = 24 x 13 = 312
1-2-1	16	10	11	9	126	(16 + 11)/2 = 13.5ru = 14, (10 + 9)/2 = 9.5rd = 9, 14 x 9 = 126
Triangle Rule, A = (a x b)/2 + (c x d)/2, or (a x d)/2 + (b x c)/2
2-2-1	41	11	35	8 + a	366	(41 + 11)/2 = 225.5ru = 226, (35 x 8)/2 = 140, 226 + 140 = 366
2-30-6	24	16	25	24	492	(24 x 16)/2 + (24 x 25)/2 = 192 + 300 = 492
5-34-3	49	14	47	12 + a	623	(49 x 12)/2 + (14 x 47)/2 = 294 + 329 = 623
Plus-Minus Rule, one sidelength +1 or +2 times another sidelength -1 or -2
1-106-25	16	8	16	7	126	(16 - 2) x (7 + 2) = 14 x 9 = 126
5-139-30	18	19	13	13 + a	252	(19 - 1) x (13 + 1) = 18 x 14 = 252
1-189-27	14	6	13	6	75	(14 + 1) x (6 - 1) = 15 x 5 = 75

== See also ==
- meter
- feet
