= Pāmitl =

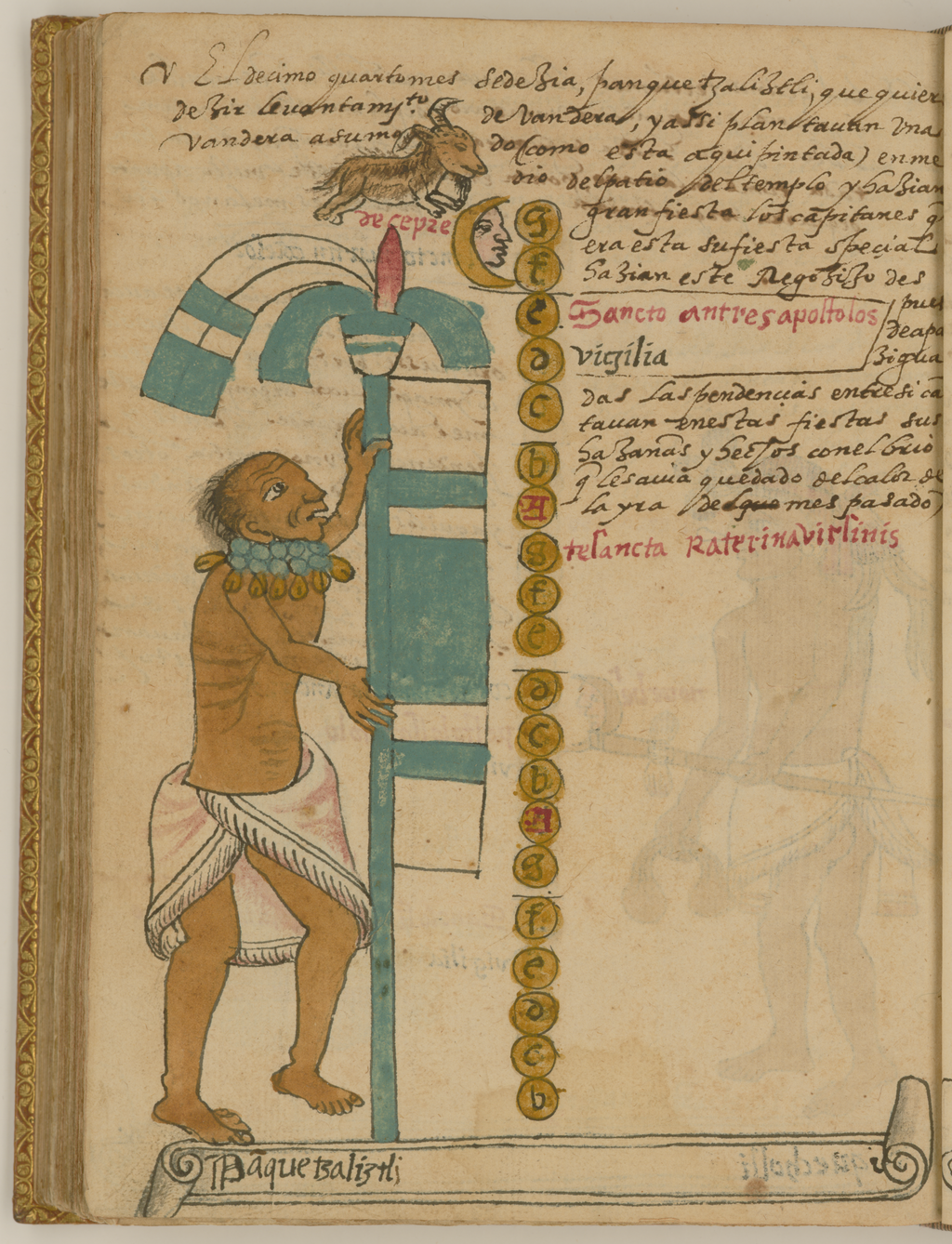
An Aztec man holding a Pāmitl as drawn by Juan de Tovar in the Ramírez Codex

Pāmitl was the Aztec name for a flag or banner containing identifying emblems of officers and prestigious warriors. These have been recorded to have been carried in the hands or more commonly worn on the back in a similar manner to the Japanese uma-jirushi. Each of the Pāmitl is brightly decorated, lightweight, and unique. These features allowed officers better control of their troops on the battlefield while not hampering the combat abilities of the soldier.

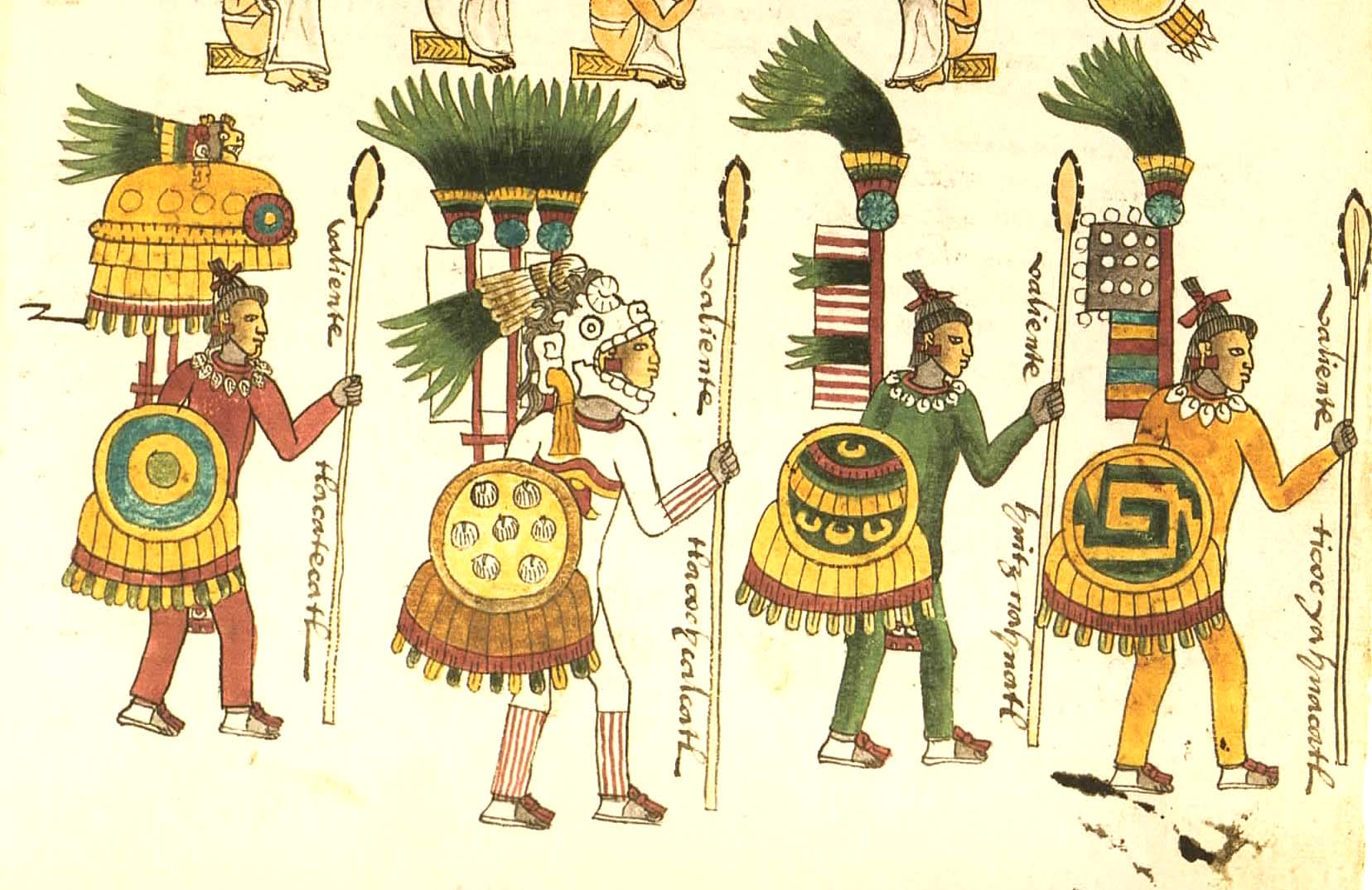
Four Aztec warriors in drawn in folio 67 of Codex Mendoza and each soldier caring a different style of Pāmitl

Similarly to much of the other clothing of the nobility of the Aztecs, Pāmitl were most likely made out of a woven cotton with feathers on top of the cotton backing. They were often formed to resemble an animal or religious symbol.

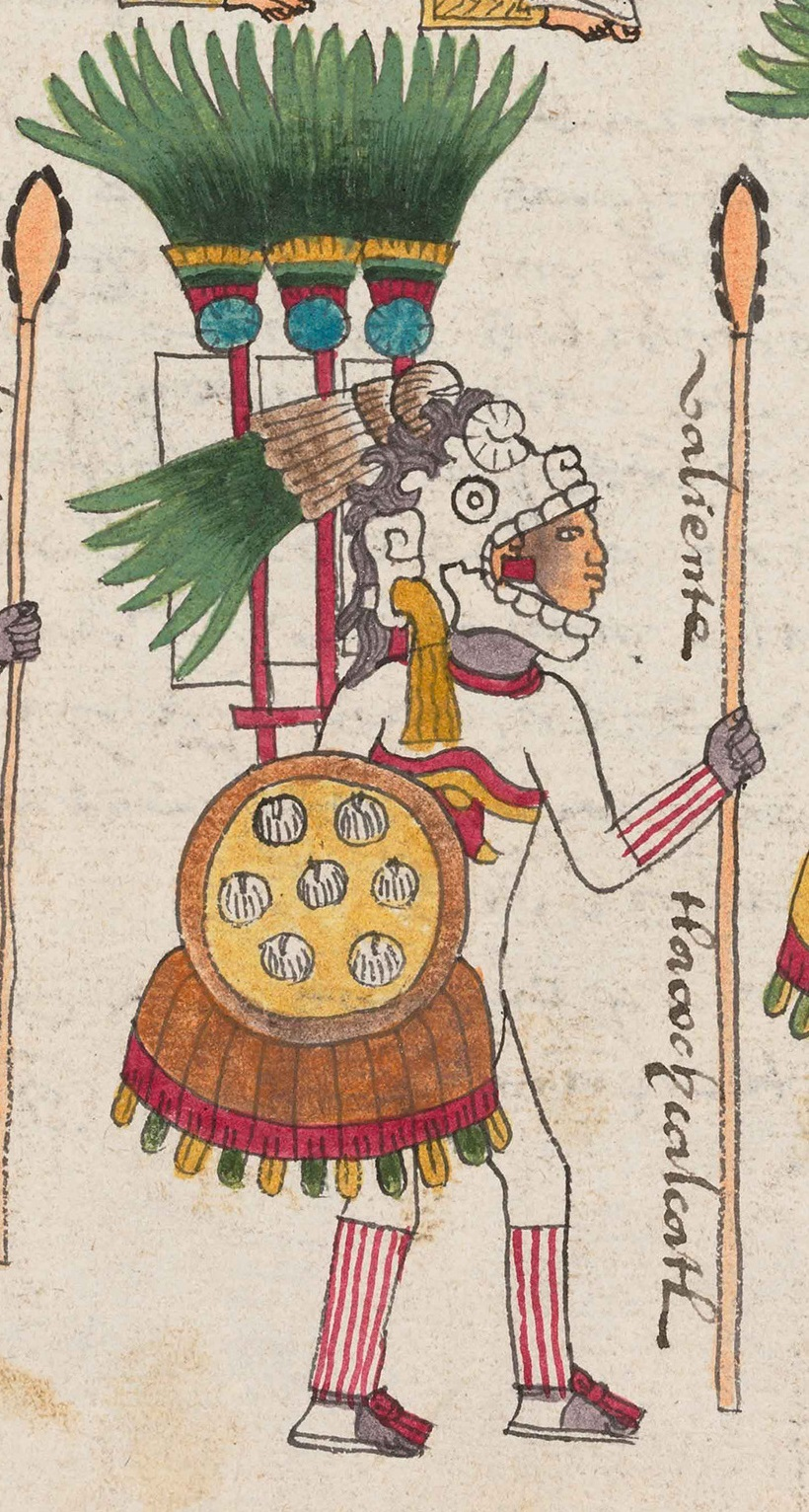
A drawing within Codex Mendoza of Tlacaelel with a white and green Pāmitl on his back
