= Quauholōlli =

Mesoamerican blunt weapon

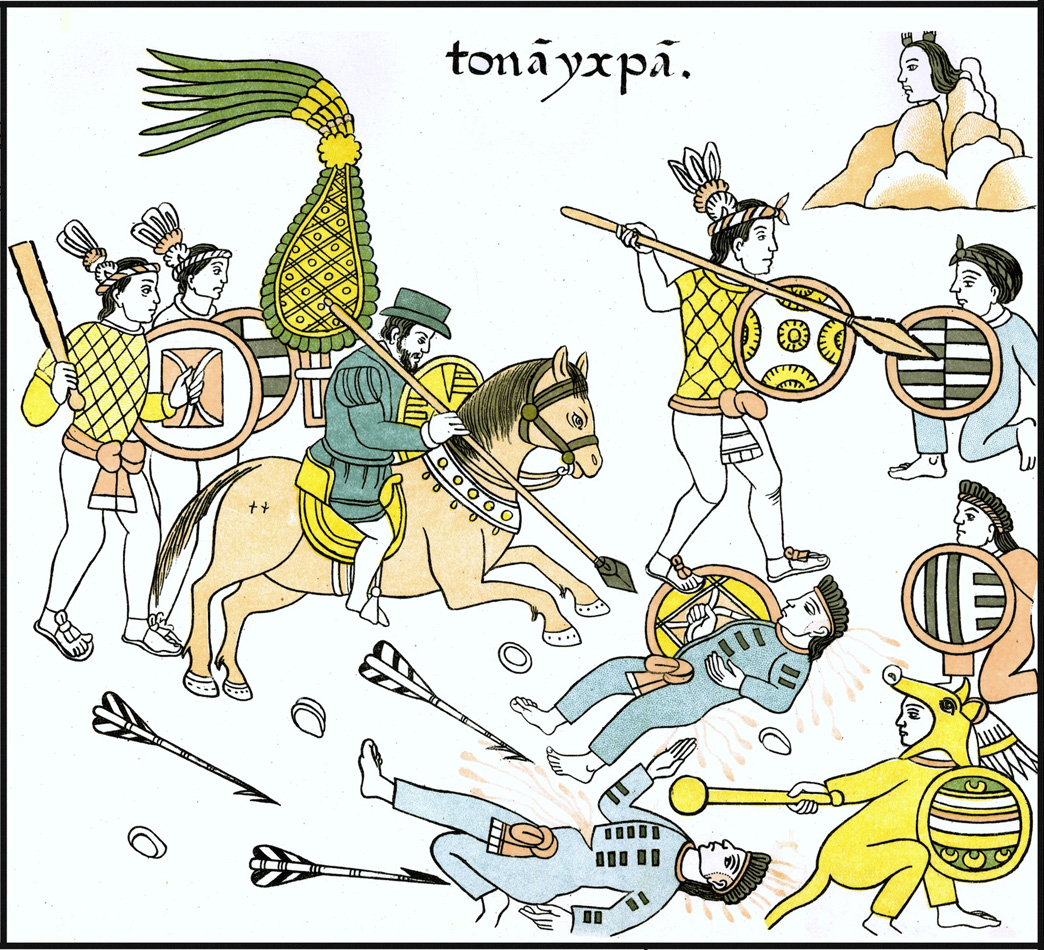
A representation of a quauholōlli (bottom right) from the Lienzo de Tlaxcala, 16th century.

The quauholōlli (also transliterated as cuauhololli) was a kind of blunt weapon used by the Aztecs, Huastecs, and Tarascans. It is a mace-like club consisting of a 50 cm (20 in) to 70 cm (28 in) long wooden stick ending in a hard ball of wood, rock or copper, used for breaking bones, as Mesoamerican shields were not strong enough to always absorb its impact. This type of weapon was effective in the downward blow, but a lot less practical in other directions. Like other Aztec clubs, its use was widespread, primarily among novice warriors.

== Uses in close combat ==
While advancing unto enemy ranks in battle, after the projectiles were used up, it was held in the shield hand, while the primary hand handled the atlatl. Upon contact, the atlatl was dropped, where the quauholōll would be used in close combat as a shock weapon, alongside the macuahuitl and the macuahuiltzoctli (a smaller variant of the macahuitl with a pointed tip, and a knob of wood protruding from each of its four sides).

== Depictions in illustrations ==
This quauholōlli is represented in the Lienzo de Tlaxcala, Codex Duran and the Florentine codex. The warriors that wield it in these depictions, always have a shield. Its representation is practically absent in sculptures. No archaeological specimens of the weapon have been discovered, but probable representations in the form of offerings, of somewhat smaller sizes, made out of obsidian and basalt, have been found in the Templo Mayor and near the Coyolxauhqui Stone sites in 1979.

== Uses in training ==
It was one of the weapons used for training in the tēlpochcalli.

== See also ==
- Aztec warfare
