= Tepoztopilli =

Polearm weapon of the Aztec military

Tepoztōpīlli from the Armeria Real collection in Madrid

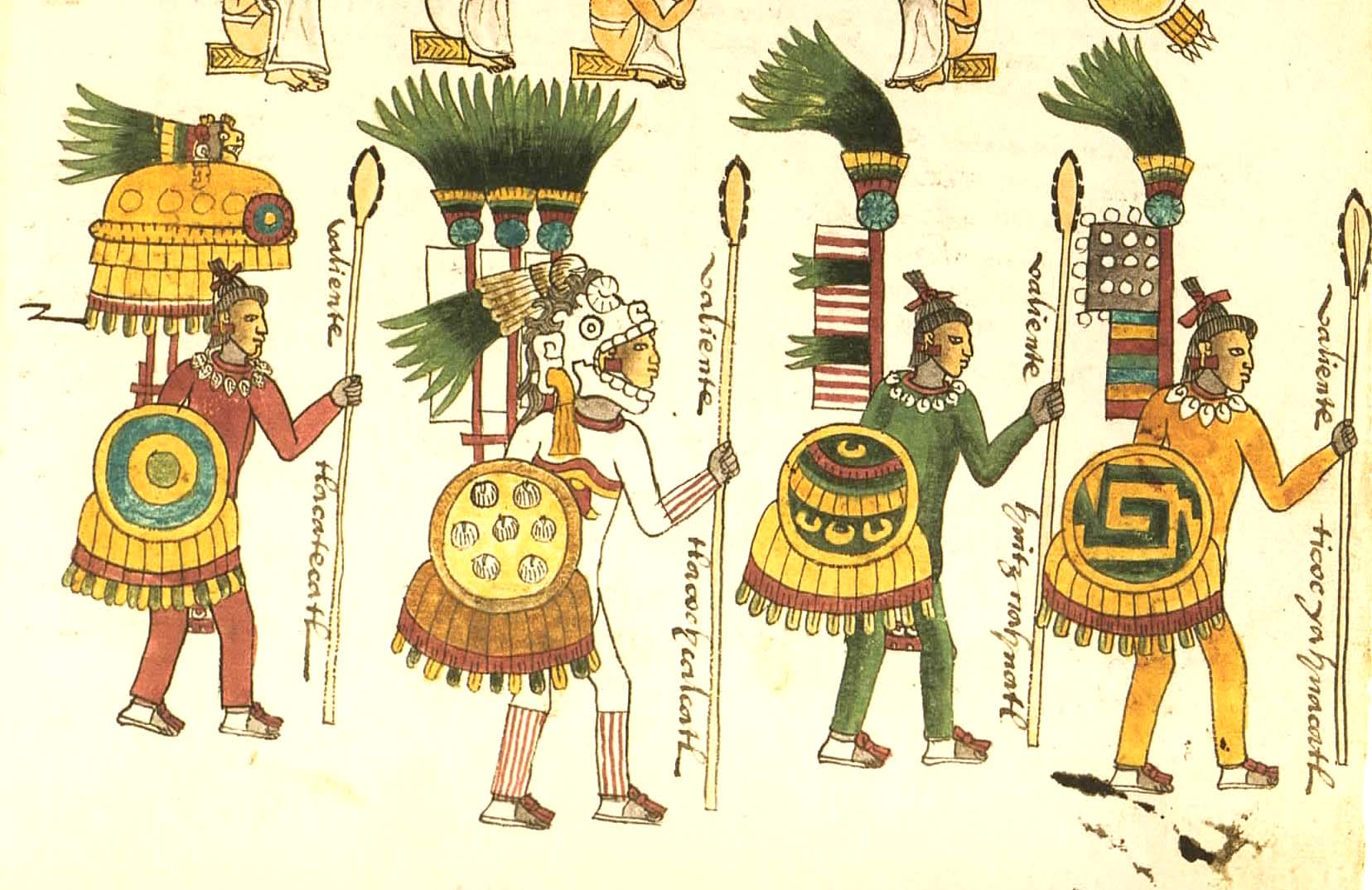
A page from the Codex Mendoza depicting Aztec warriors each wielding a tepoztopilli

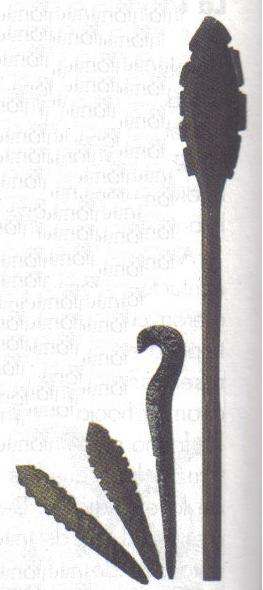
Modern replica of a tepoztopilli.

The tepoztopilli [tepostoːˈpiːlːi] was a common front-line weapon of the Aztec military. The tepoztopilli was a polearm, and judging from depictions in various Aztec codices, it was roughly the height of a man, although historian John Pohl indicates that the weapon used between the 12th and 14th century was made in sizes from 3 to 7 ft (0.91 to 2.13 m) in length. The wedge-shaped wooden head, about twice the length of the users' palm or shorter, was edged with razor-sharp obsidian blades which were deeply set in grooves carved into the head. They were cemented in place with bitumen or plant resin as an adhesive. This made the tepoztopilli vaguely similar to the macuahuitl or "macana", however it had a much smaller cutting edge and a longer handle. The greater length gave the weapon a superior reach, allowing the user to stand behind a line of more experienced warriors and then "shove or jab the weapon" into an adversary.

Halfway between a halberd and a spear, the tepoztopilli was equally useful for slashing and thrusting. Conquistador Bernal Díaz del Castillo mentions that on one occasion his armour was pierced by an Aztec lance and that only his thick cotton underpadding saved his life.

The last authentic tepoztopilli was destroyed in a fire in 1884 in the Armería Real in Madrid where it was housed.
