= Obsidian use in Mesoamerica =

Aspect of Mesoamerican material culture

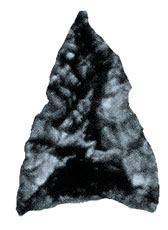
Obsidian projectile point.

Obsidian is a naturally formed volcanic glass that was an important part of the material culture of Pre-Columbian Mesoamerica. Obsidian was a highly integrated part of daily and ritual life, and its widespread and varied use may be a significant contributor to Mesoamerica's lack of metallurgy. Lithic and contextual analysis of obsidian, including source studies, are important components of archaeological studies of past Mesoamerican cultures and inform scholars on economy, technological organization, long-distance trade, ritual organization, local exchange systems, and socio-cultural structure. Obsidian was also exchanged in local markets. There, tools were provided to households.

== Production techniques ==
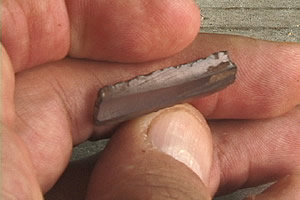
An obsidian prismatic blade fragment from the Maya site of Chunchucmil

Due to its glassy internal structure, obsidian is relatively easy to work, as it breaks in very predictable and controlled ways via conchoidal fracturing. This contributed to its prolific use throughout Mesoamerica. It is obtained by either quarrying source sites or in nodule form from riverbeds or fractured outcrops.

Following the removal of cortex (when applicable), bifacial, unifacial, and expedient flake stone tools could be produced through lithic reduction. The use of pecking, grinding, and carving techniques may also be employed to produce figurines, jewelry, eccentrics, or other types of objects. Prismatic blade production, a technique employing a pressure flaking-like technique that removed blades from a polyhedral core, was ubiquitous throughout Mesoamerica.

Modern attempts to redesign production techniques are heavily based on Spanish records and accounts of witnessed obsidian knapping. Motolinia, a 16th-century Spanish observer, left this account of prismatic blade production:

It is in this manner: First they get out a knife stone (obsidian core) which is black like jet and 20 cm or slightly less in length, and they make it cylindrical and as thick as the calf of the leg, and they place the stone between the feet, and with a stick apply force to the edges of the stone, and at every push they give a little knife springs off with its edges like those of a razor."

The widespread use of obsidian necessitated a large workforce to produce enough tools to supply an area. During Monte Alban's most populous period, for example, 900 to 1800 people were working obsidian. In Teotihuacan, a major contributor, if not exerting monopolistic control of obsidian trade and production, possessed more than 100 obsidian workshops within the city.

While much obsidian was produced in workshops, some blades and tools were produced in residential areas. Most production occurred near the centers of settlements.

As the distribution of obsidian sources in Mesoamerica is generally limited, many areas and sites lacked a local obsidian source or direct access to one. As a result, tool curation through edge-rejuvenation and/or resharpening was commonly used on larger-mass tools, such as bifaces, to prolong the tool's (and the raw material's) utility. While prismatic blades were generally not curated (in the traditional sense) due to their small size, utility of the tools may have been maintained by changing their function. In other words, as the edge of a blade lost its sharpness after long-term use, the blade may have been used in scraping activities, which does not require a very sharp edge, than as a cutting implement. Other curation techniques of prismatic blades involve reshaping them into other tool types, such as projectile points and awls.

== Sources ==
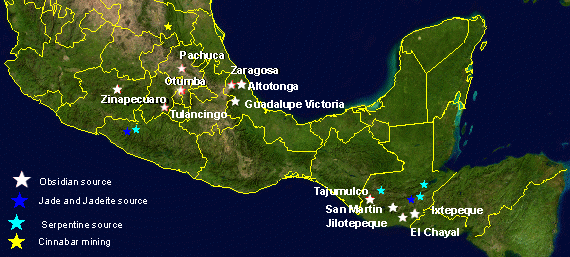
Map showing the locations of some of the main obsidian sources in Mesoamerica

Obsidian sources in Mesoamerica are limited in number and distribution, and are restricted to the volcanic regions of the Sierra Madre Mountains as they run through Mexico and Guatemala. These resources, however, are still quite abundant in the archaeological record and their origins can be traced by their physical and geological properties. Before discussing these obsidian sources, a definition of what an obsidian source is must be established, as many of the terms used allow for different and competing interpretations.

Sidrys et al. (1976) stated that an obsidian source area includes several outcroppings of obsidian, limited in spatial extent, which may or may not have common chemical features and may or may not have been used by ancient humans. Michael D. Glascock, of the University of Missouri Research Reactor Center at the University of Missouri (which performs neutron activation analysis), has divided Mesoamerica into nine sub-regions with one or more obsidian sources in each. These subdivisions, while effective at systemizing the source characteristics and allowing for a more easily visualized distribution of sources, are still tentative. They are as follows:

- Zaragoza (includes the Zaragoza and Altotonga quarries), in the south-central Gulf lowlands of Mexico)
- Bazoli (includes the Cranzido and Partigo sources), in the central highlands of Mexico
- Orizaba (includes the Pico de Orizaba, Guadalupe Victoria, and Las Derrumbadas sources), in the south-central Gulf lowlands of Mexico
- Paredon (Paredon and Santa Elena sources), in the central highlands of Mexico
- Otumba (Otumba and Malpais), in the central highlands of Mexico
- Tulancingo (Tulancingo and Tepalcingo), in the central highlands of Mexico
- Pachuca (a number of different quarries), in the central highlands of Mexico
- Zacualtipan (Zacualtipan, one source only), in the central highlands of Mexico
- Ucareo (Ucareo and Zinapécuaro) – largest source in west Mexico (in Michoacán).
- The Guatemalan region – which incorporates all sources located in the Guatemalan highlands. Tajumulco, El Chayal, Ixtepeque, and San Martín Jilotepeque are the best known obsidian sources in Guatemala and were commonly exploited in Pre-Columbian Mesoamerica. In fact, almost all Obsidian found in Olmec and Maya sites originates from these sources.

Sources in the Valley of Mexico, which fell under Teotihuacan control during the Early Classic, were Pachuca, Otumba, and Chicoloapan. Obsidian from Pachuca is notable because of its unique green-gold color and its internal purity which makes it one of the highest quality obsidian sources in Mesoamerica. It was much sought after and widely traded. Green obsidian is also found in the area of Tulancingo, but is distinct from Pachuca obsidian because of its internal opacity (e.g., it is a more milky or clouded green).

Substantial research has been carried out to decipher the Guatemala region sources. As mentioned earlier, the Guatemalan region includes the El Chayal, Ixtepeque, and San Martin Jilotepeque sources, located in southern/southeastern Guatemala. Obsidian originating from Guatemala was widely used in Mesoamerica and is found as far north as the Yucatán Peninsula, moving via a well-developed long-distance trade network that inter-connected much of the Maya area. Newer and tentative additions to the Guatemalan source area are Jalapa and Sansare. However, the El Chayal area is often seen as subsuming these two into one large source area. The Pre Classic Monte Alto culture and the Olmecs also used the Tajumulco Volcano source, in the southwest of Guatemala, a source that was almost forgotten during the Classic and Post Classic periods.

== Analytical methods ==
=== Trace element analysis ===
Obsidian, a volcanic glass, comes from several geological sources in Mesoamerica, as listed above. Each of these sources has a distinctive “fingerprint” of trace elements that proportionally vary due to the individual circumstances of each source's formation. Neutron activation analysis (NAA) and X-ray fluorescence (XRF) are two analytical methods used to identify the types and amounts of trace elements. These data are then statistically compared to data already available for the known sources. Additionally, archaeologists can study the core pieces left behind during the tool-making process to identify the type of blade production.

=== Visual sourcing ===
Visual sourcing is the process by which the source of obsidian artifacts are determined by the analysis of not only their visual appearance (e.g., color, inclusions, etc.) but also their physical attributes, such as surface texture, light reflection, internal opacity, and so on. While not as reliable as trace element analysis, and completely dependent on the experience of the researcher, visual sourcing has a number of advantages. Primarily, it is a cheap method that allows for the analysis of an entire obsidian assemblage. This is in comparison to trace element analysis which, due to high costs, allows for the analysis of only a small sample, preferably one that is statistically representative.

=== Hydration dating ===
Obsidian hydration dating is a method that allows for the absolute or relative dating of an obsidian sample. The degree of hydration (i.e., water absorbed into the material) observed indicates how long it has been since the obsidian surface was exposed (i.e., through flaking). Obsidian hydration dating is at times, however, unreliable. The rate of hydration can vary tremendously depending on annual rainfall and humidity levels, among other factors, and how these have varied since the piece was first produced (or how they vary if the piece moved from one ecological zone to another).

Due to the nature of the geological formation of obsidian, and the impact that each unique formation incidence has on the appearance and geochemical properties of each source, the material serves as an excellent medium by which long-distance trade can be studied. In performing trace-element or visual analyses, the origins of an artifact's material can be determined.

It is clear that obsidian was a critical material in Precolumbian Mesoamerican economies; it is ubiquitous throughout the region, and found in the material record of all cultures and time periods. The low bulk of obsidian in transport, which therefore required less effort in trade, and the large quantity of useful items that could be produced from a small amount of material, greatly contributed to obsidian's widespread use.

One example is the presence of Pachuca obsidian from central Mexico, where Mexico City is now, and ostensibly under the control of Teotihuacan, in the Maya area during the Early Classic. While the Maya had access to a number of local obsidian sources more readily available and (relatively) easily obtained, including El Chayal its main source, Pachuca obsidian remained an important trade good. The Olmec, from the Gulf coast likewise obtained its obsidian also from El Chayal in Guatemala (Andrews (1990: 13). It is unclear if trade for foreign obsidian contributed to the growth of Maya polities, or if it simply served as a mode for obtaining superior items or human labor. Generally, obsidian came into the Maya area via larger central places, such as Tikal, Uaxactun, and Palenque. Obsidian artifacts and tools were then redistributed to smaller and potentially dependent centers and communities. This is indicated by a lack of production debitage, including polyhedral cores, decortical flakes, and large percussion flakes, among rural occupations.

Obsidian was generally transported, where applicable, along coastal trade routes. Of primary importance is the circum-peninsular trade route that linked the southeast Maya area to the Gulf coast of Mexico. Examples of evidence of this include the higher quantities of obsidian found among coastal sites, such as small island occupations off the coast of Belize, then at sites located in-land.

== Use ==
=== Utilitarian ===
Obsidian, called itztli in the Nahuatl language, has been found at nearly every Mesoamerican archaeological site. Items made from this material had both utilitarian and ritual use. In many areas, it was available to all households regardless of socio-economic status, and was used in hunting, agriculture, food preparation, and for many other daily activities. Morphologically, obsidian was worked into a variety of tool forms, including knives, lance and projectile points, prismatic blades, general bifacial tools, and utilized flakes. Blades have been found in situ with rabbit, rodent, and mollusk remains, indicating their use in butchery. The practical use of obsidian is obvious considering that the material can be used to make some of the sharpest edges on earth.

=== Ideological ===
Obsidian was also used in a variety of non-utilitarian contexts. Objects made of obsidian were used as associated grave goods, employed in sacrifice (in whatever form), and in art. Some non-utilitarian forms include miniature human effigies, ear spools and labrets with gold and turquoise workings, carved animal figurines, beads, vases, and as pieces of masks.

Obsidian was frequently used in ritualized autosacrifice (blood-letting) activities, serving as a substitute for stingray spines. Its association with that act of bloodletting is important, as it is argued by some researchers that obsidian was seen as a type of blood originating from the earth – its use in autosacrifice is therefore especially symbolic. Objects made of obsidian were often buried in upper class tombs as special deposits or caches. Obsidian debitage is found in many of these tombs in addition to evidence of its use in temple dedications, potlaching, or offerings. For example, flakes have been found in association with stelae offerings and related to specific gods at the Maya site of Tikal. Its ritualized use is not, however, restricted to high-status political and religious contexts, and it was clearly used within mundane domestic and household rituals.

== Representation in art and writing ==
Most of the evidence that supports the many theories about obsidian use in Mesoamerica comes from the artwork of the region. This artwork is seen in many forms including the aforementioned obsidian figurines, ear spools, beads, and vases. Stele and large carvings, sculpture, and murals on architecture also depict obsidian. Typically, the material's visual depiction in artwork is generally associated with autosacrifice and other types of sacrifice, including images of prismatic blades with bloody hearts on the blade's ends. Unfortunately, the majority of the material record is out of context yet the implications and interpretations that are drawn from artwork are substantial and reflect a corpus of beliefs and ideology involving obsidian.

Some of the more significant portrayals of obsidian use involve blood-letting and warfare. One example includes the macuahuitl, a broad–faced club studded along its edges by obsidian prismatic blades. These weapons are predominantly used in ritual warfare and generally date to the Postclassic period. Earlier depictions of obsidian is usually restricted to their appearance as razors or lancets, and it is commonly believed that the material was not associated with weapons such as clubs or spears until later phases in Mesoamerica.

In the Aztec writing system, a curved prismatic blade represents the phonetic value itz (Taube 1991) and results in the term itztli, as mentioned.

== Value ==
Obsidian was widely distributed throughout Mesoamerica by trade. Its importance to Mesoamerican societies has been compared to the value and importance of steel to modern civilization. However, archaeology provides varied evidence of the individual value placed on obsidian. For example, during the Preclassic period, obsidian was a rare item in the lowland areas, found predominantly in high-status and ritual contexts. In many Maya excavations evidence of obsidian is likewise found most frequently in privileged settings. As the Late Classic period progressed, obsidian became increasingly accessible to the lower classes of Maya civilization. Nevertheless, the Maya upper classes continued to remain in possession of the more prestigious Teotihuacan green obsidian.

In the Teotihuacan culture obsidian was perhaps traded at a loss of human effort in transport across long distances. The profit from the trade lay in prestigious high-status items received in return. Obsidian has both been seen as a key element to Teotihuacan's rise to power and as a side trade element that simply augmented their already developing wealth. Obsidian forms part of many high-status items, such as valuable ear-spools, but these obsidian ear-spools have also been discovered in exclusively lower-status settings. Thus the value of obsidian can be considered highly variable. It was an important trade item, but is found in a variety of environments, unlike many items whose ownership was confined to the upper classes. Finally, there is no indication that obsidian was used as a currency in Mesoamerica.

== See also ==
- Lithic analysis
- Mirrors in Mesoamerican culture
- Prismatic blade
