= The Apotheosis of Cuauhtémoc =

Mural by David Alfaro Siqueiros

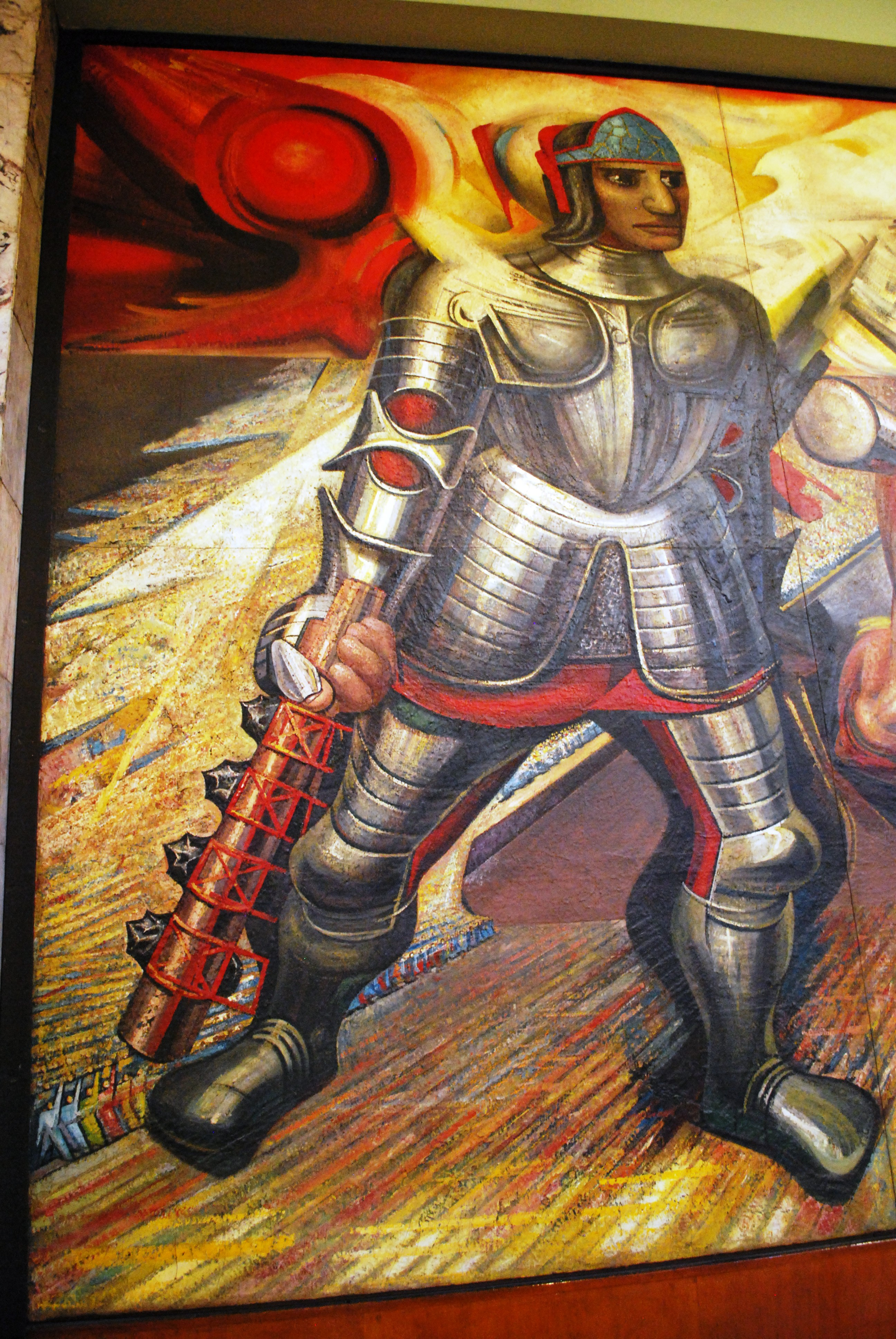
- Detail of the mural
- Artist: David Alfaro Siqueiros
- Year: 1950–1951
- Medium: piroxiline on celotex
- Dimensions: 449 cm × 795 cm (177 in × 313 in)
- Location: Palacio de Bellas Artes, Mexico City

The Apotheosis of Cuauhtémoc (Spanish: Apoteosis de Cuauhtémoc) is a mural by Mexican artist David Alfaro Siqueiros, created in 1950 and 1951, at the Palacio de Bellas Artes, in Mexico City. It is part of a diptych dedicated to Cuauhtémoc, the last emperor of the Aztecs.

== History ==
Before the mural's creation, the purported discovery of Cuauhtémoc's remains took place in 1949, by archaeologist Eulalia Guzmán. The alleged remains were found in Ixcateopan, Guerrero. After this event, Fernando Gamboa, head of the Department of Visual Arts and deputy director general of the National Institute of Fine Arts (INBA), presented Siqueiros with an agreement on 14 March 1950. The agreement stipulated that the artist would create two panels: one depicting the torture Cuauhtémoc suffered at the hands of the Spanish, the Torture of Cuauhtémoc ("Tormento de Cuauhtémoc"), and the other depicting a different story: The Apotheosis of Cuauhtémoc. Both works were completed in the same year Siqueiros was assigned. They are located on the second floor of the Palace as part of Siqueiros's permanent exhibition. The creation process was observed by both museum staff and visitors.

The diptych was completed in 1951, on different dates. The second mural, which depicts the apotheosis, was finished in April, while the first was completed in August. On 23 August 1951, both works were inaugurated by the Secretary of Public Education, Manuel Gual Vidal.

== Description ==
The mural depicts Cuauhtémoc wearing Spanish-style armor, with a blue headdress. In his right hand, he holds a macana or macuahuitl pointing downwards. To his right is a centaur with its abdomen exposed, brought down by a spear that pierced its chest, causing it to twist backwards. Below there is the symbol of an atom. The entire scene takes place atop an ancient indigenous temple. Warm, bluish, and grayish colors were used throughout the work, highlighting the figure of Cuauhtémoc.

== Analysis ==
In contrast to the first part of the diptych, which depicts the torture Cuauhtémoc suffered at the hands of the Spanish, the second part is a fictional, symbolic story where Cuauhtémoc emerges victorious; this is illustrated by the image of the fallen centaur. The centaur is a symbol representing an anthropomorphic combination of horses and the Spanish, as well as an allusion to the indigenous people's initial impression of them. The position of the mythical creature, pierced by the lance, alludes to the defeat of the Spanish; below it is the symbol of the atom, representing the use of the atomic energy and the technological advancements made by the United States during and after World War II.

The armor worn by Cuauhtémoc represents the taking of weapons used by the strong from the weak, confronting them with the same weapons; the resistance of a brave and strong leader of a people oppressed and subjugated by their conquerors. In this case, the Spanish and partly the Americans, thus achieving the objective of highlighting the figure of the famous tlatoani as an hero.
