= Firehouse Site =

Archaeological site in Indiana

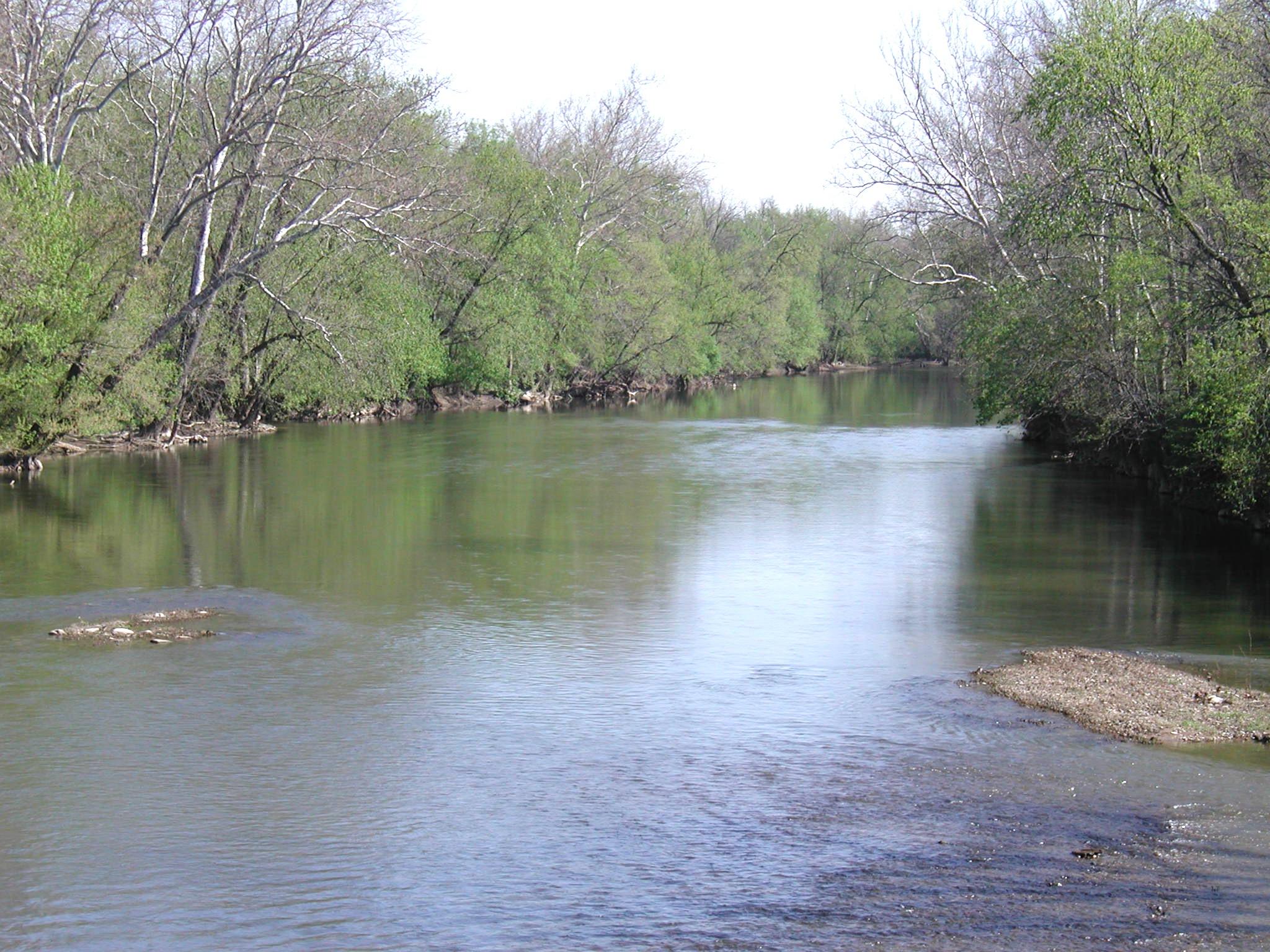
Great Miami River, location of Firehouse Site

The Firehouse Site located on the junction of two rivers, Ohio and Great Miami Rivers in Dearborn County, Indiana was recently excavated in the year 2003 and 2004. With the discovering of large assemblages of 300 bones and antler implements. This site provided an opportunity to study organic tools typically rare to find outside of wet sites, or near the Midwest. This specific excavation resulted in the recovery of bones, antler, tooth, tool, and turtle shell objects that will be discussed further more in the sections below.

== Excavation history ==
In the year 2003 and 2004, Landmark Archaeological and Environmental Services began phase III mitigation to identified cultural features. This site is occupied by two primary components known as the Late Archaic McWhinney and Terminal Archaic Riverton. The Late to Terminal Archaic assemblage recovered from the Firehouse site is large and includes thousands of pieces of debitage and hundreds of chipped-stone scrapers, bifaces, retouched flakes, and other tools. This excavation was the first sizable Terminal Archaic assemblage with the recovery of bone and antler tool in the lower of Ohio River Valley.

== Materials and methods ==
Archaeologist take advantage with the recovery of objects such as antler and bones, to understand past life ways. The Firehouse preservation promotes a fairly alkaline soil condition which is common for artifacts of antler and bone to be recover in these sites. It is likely that the poor preservation of organic artifacts at many sites presents a significant bias that precludes accurate behavior interpretations. Therefore, two primary bone tool techniques were used to better assess the recovery of artifacts: abrasion and lithic shaving. Lithic shaving, also known as lithic analysis, involves the artifacts morphology, the measurement of various physical attributes, and examining other visible features. Abrasion is the process of scuffing, wearing down, marring or rubbing away. Other common methods use for the excavation include fire hardening, percussion or pressure flaking, and longitudinal groove-and-snap technique.

== Recovery of artifacts ==
=== Bone tools ===
220 modified-bone objects were recovered from the Firehouse site. Although a couple of bones were unidentified, two types of bones consisted of pointed and spatulate implements. Pointed implements consist of a single converging functional end, while spatulate are widely rounded or squared instead of converging. In addition to spatulate implements being very similar to pointed implements with the difference that the working ends are broadly rounded or squared. Archaeologist were able to identify the usages of these bone tools by analyzing the implements. For example, eight pointed implements from Firehouse retain part or all of an articular surface of the anatomical element used for their manufacture. The expanded proximal ends likely acted as grips for implements such as basketry, weaving, and matting tools.

=== Modified teeth ===
Six modified teeth were found at the excavation site. Five out of the six modified teeth were mammal teeth ranging from small to medium-sized. Some of these objects were most likely use as an ornament such as forming a bracelet or necklace. One out of the six objects were modified for usage most likely as a tool. Polish and manufacture trace on the broken edge confirms the tooth was not whole when used as a tool.

== Bibliography ==
Christopher R. Moore (2017) An Examination of Terminal Archaic Bone and Antler Implements from the Firehouse Site, Dearborn County, Indiana, Midcontinental Journal of Archaeology, 42:3, 223–243, doi:10.1080/01461109.2017.1368964

File is http://oh.water.usgs.gov/miam/MIAM_NAWQA/gmr_vandalia.jpg
