= Aztec warrior =

Aztec warrior may refer to:

- Eagle warrior, a class of warrior in Aztec society
- Jaguar warrior, a class of warrior in Aztec society
