= Jaguar warrior =

Type of elite Aztec warrior

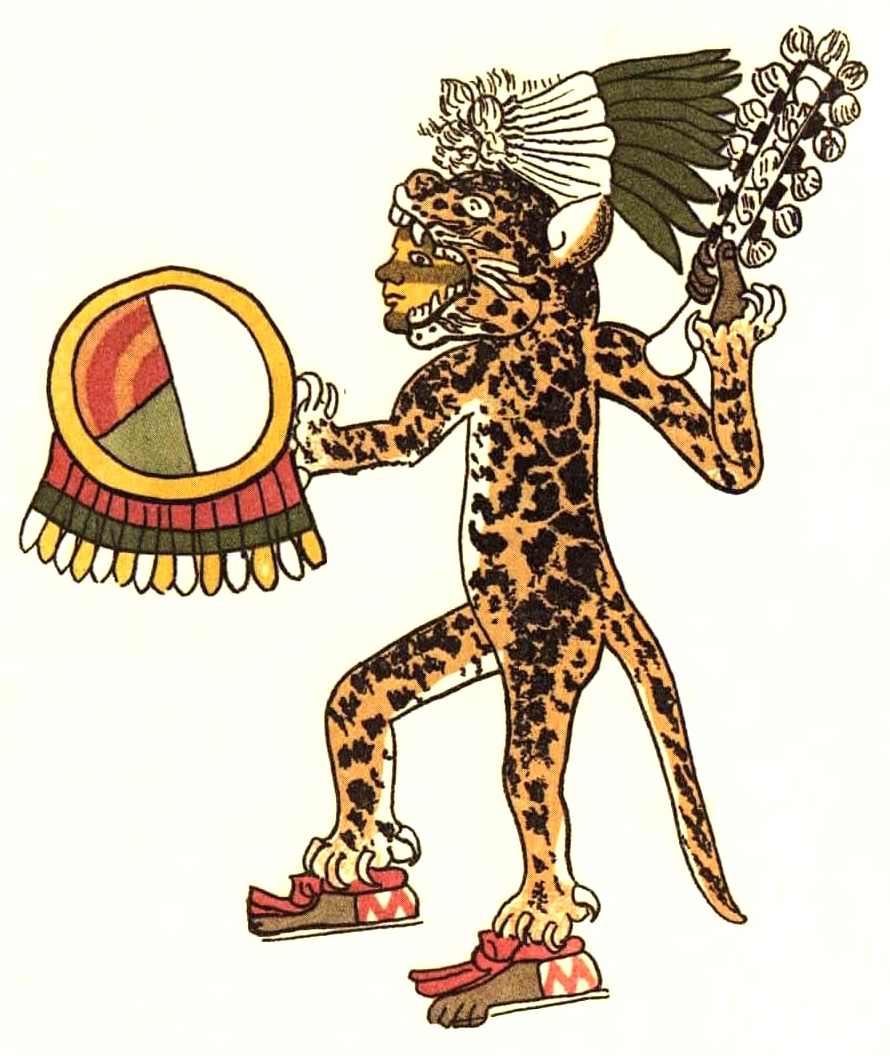
An Aztec Jaguar warrior

Jaguar warriors or jaguar knights (Nahuatl languages: ocēlōtl, pl. ocēlōmeh; pronounced [oˈseːloːt͡ɬ]) were members of the Aztec military elite, similar to the eagle warriors. They were a type of Aztec warrior called a cuāuhocēlōtl ([kʷaːwoˈseːloːt͡ɬ], from cuāuhtli 'eagle' and ocēlōtl 'jaguar')

The jaguar motif was used due to the belief the jaguar represented Tezcatlipoca. Aztecs also wore this dress at war because they believed the animal's strengths would be given to them during battles. Jaguar warriors were used at the battlefront in military campaigns. They were also used to capture prisoners for sacrifice to the Aztec gods. Many statues and images (in pre-Columbian and post-Columbian codices) of these warriors have survived. They fought with a wooden club, studded with obsidian volcanic glass blades, called a macuahuitl. They also used spears and atlatls.

To become a jaguar warrior, a member of the Aztec army had to capture a total of four enemies from battles. This was said to honor their gods in a way far greater than killing enemy soldiers on the battlefield. For a warrior to kill an enemy was considered clumsy.

== Education ==
The formal education of the Aztecs was to train and teach young boys how to function in their society as warriors. The Aztecs had no standing army, so every boy not of noble birth was trained to become a warrior. All boys who were between the ages of 10 and 20 years old would attend one of the two schools. These two schools were the Telpochcalli (the neighborhood school for commoners) and the Calmecac, the exclusive school for nobles. At the Telpochcalli students would learn the art of warfare, and would become warriors. At the Calmecac students would be trained to become leaders such as generals, priests and government officials.

At the age of 15, sons of commoners would be sent to a Telpochcalli within their neighborhood. Here, boys would be trained in the art of warfare and accustomed to military life. The instructors at these schools were veteran warriors who had experience in warfare and leadership. The schools focused on bravery and included a great deal of physical effort and intense pain to increase the strength and stamina of the students. Manual labor included transporting goods such as branches for firewood. The longer the student had attended the school, the more branches he would be expected to carry. This test of carrying firewood would be used to determine if the boy would do well in warfare.

Other manual labor tasks carried out from the Telpochcalli would be community projects. These projects would mainly consist of cleaning areas, building walls, digging canals, and farming. From these projects, students would work hard to complete tasks, and gain the physical experience needed to engage in warfare. The students of this school would also be used to transport shields, food, military supplies, weapons, armor, and wood to warriors on the battlefield. The reason for forcing the students to be near the battlefield was to make them fearless of warfare. Students were under heavy surveillance at all times. If a student was caught leaving training his punishment would be severe. Often, he would be beaten and his hair removed. Removing a student's hair would remove any sign of that boy's being a warrior. Drinking pulque was prohibited; if caught, the student could be beaten to death. Relationships outside of the school were also prohibited; if a student was caught sleeping with a woman, he would be beaten to death, or severely punished.

== Life as a jaguar warrior ==
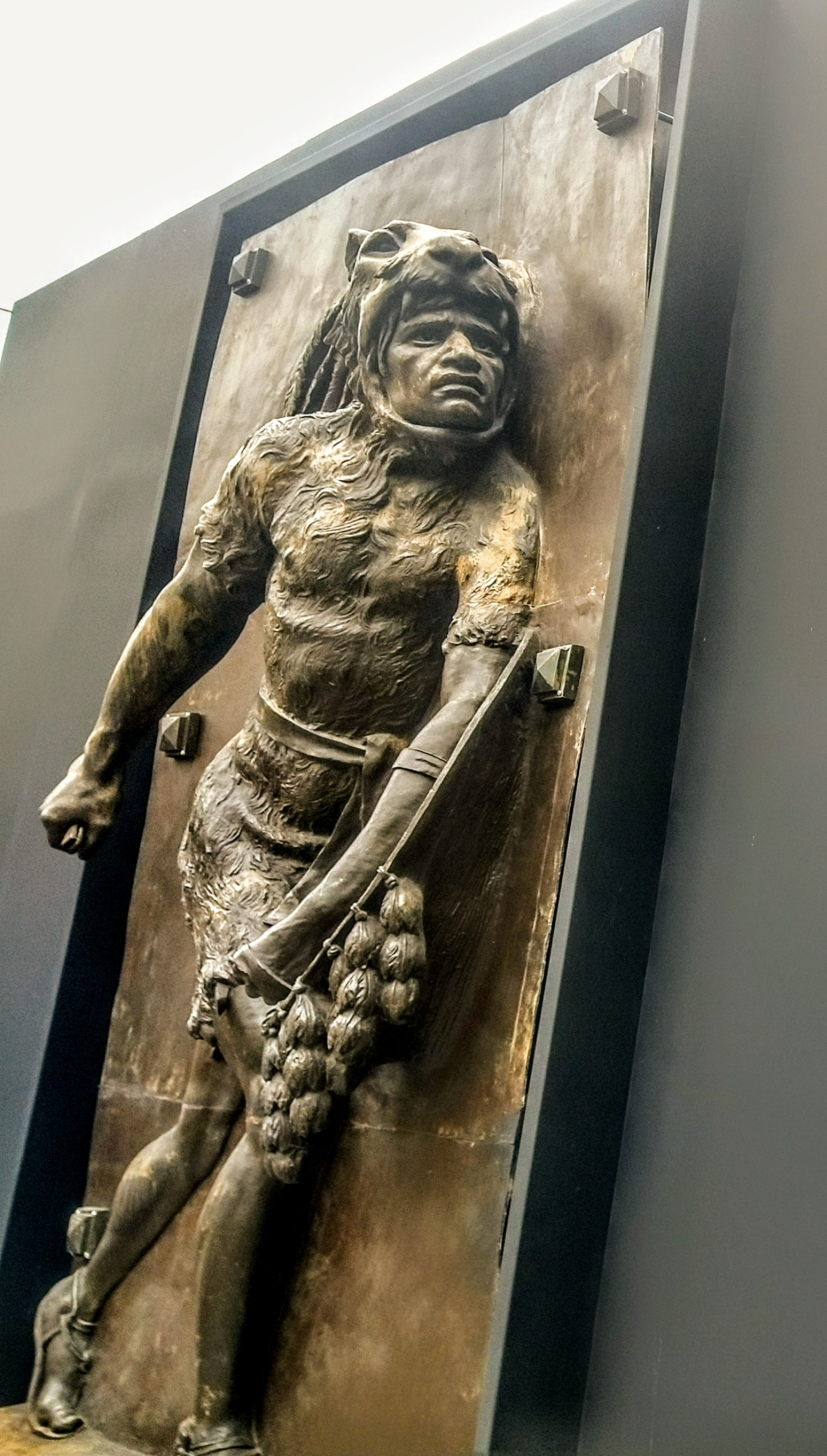
Bronze relief by Jesús Fructuoso Contreras depicting Cacamatzin as a jaguar warrior

Following the warrior's path was one of the few ways to change one's social status in Aztec culture. Eagle and Jaguar warriors were full-time warriors who worked for the city-state to protect merchants and the city itself. They were expected to be leaders and commanders both on and off the battlefield and acted as sort of a police force for the city. Men who reached this rank were considered as nobles and elites of society and were granted many of the same privileges as a noble. Outside of battle, soldiers and officers were permitted to wear a distinctive cloak called a tilmatli. They were allowed to drink pulque, have concubines, and dine at the royal palace. Jaguar warriors also participated in gladiatorial sacrifices. To be called a jaguar warrior meant that the man had shown a great combat ability and was fearless. Since in combat, one of the key actions was to take prisoners, who were later sacrificed as offerings to Aztec deities, a jaguar suit and helmet were the awards a soldier received for capturing four enemies.

Part of the warriors' everyday life included training the youth. The older and more experienced warriors would teach the youth how to handle basic weapons, such as slings, arrows, and spears. With more promising students, the progress was much faster, and they were soon advanced to training with swords and shields. Boys were introduced to the actual war violence through religious festivals during the year.

== Weaponry ==
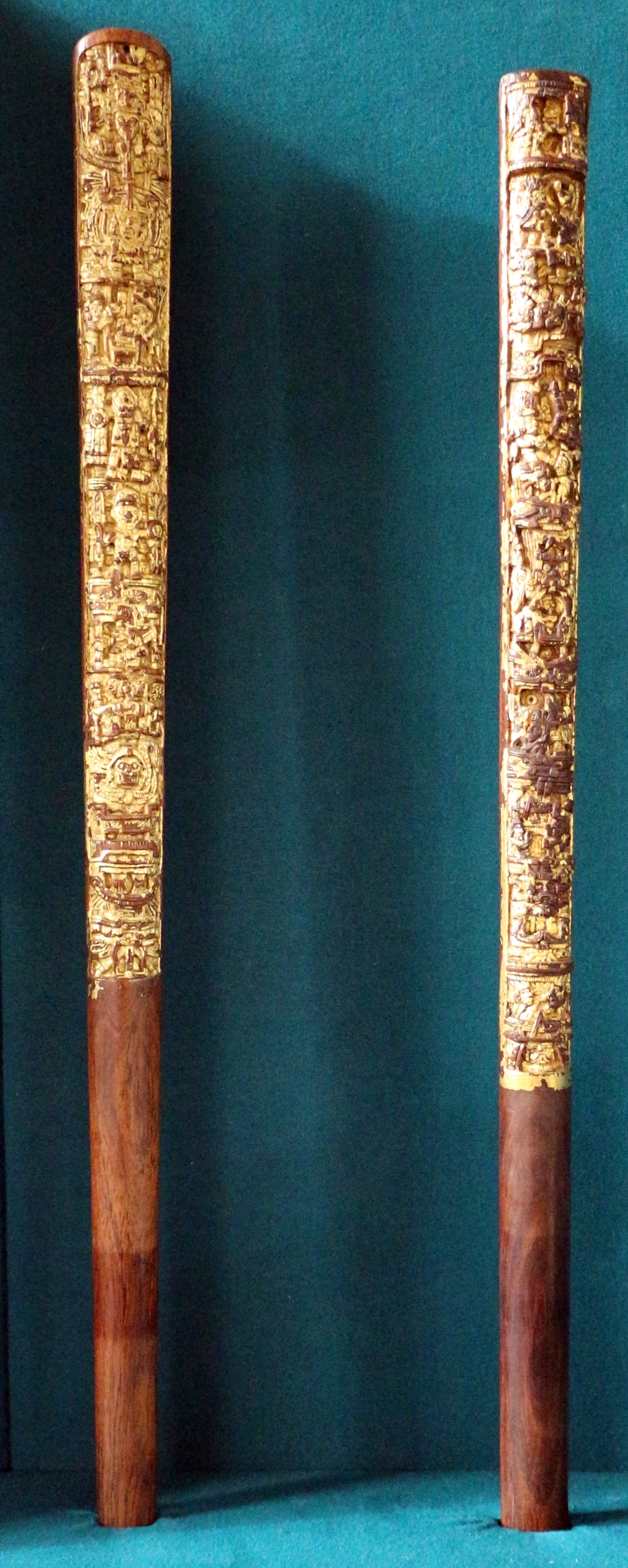
An atlatl spear thrower that was donated to Pope Clement VII

The weapons used by Aztec warriors can be divided into two main categories: Offensive and Defensive. As the names imply, depending on the objective, a different weapon was used. For example, some of the offensive weapons include bows and arrows, darts and atlatls, spears, slings, swords, and clubs. On the other hand, defensive weapons included shields, helmets, and various types of body armor. With regards to weapons used by Aztec warriors, military experience and social status played a significant role in determining an Aztec warrior’s weapon arsenal and military uniform used in battle. Greater military experience and higher social status an Aztec warrior accumulated, the more sophisticated their options for weaponry and military clothing became. At the most basic warrior level, all warriors were trained to use a sling to launch projectiles (often rocks or stones) and a bow. Moreover blunt weapons such as clubs and axes commonly made out of wood and stone were used by warriors when having to engage in close hand-to-hand combat. As previously mentioned, the Jaguar warriors were permitted to use the spear known as the atlat. This particular weapon demanded immense amounts of skill of practice in order to master atlat Although there was a wide variety of weapons, jaguar and eagle warriors used different weapons; jaguar warriors are most often associated with atlatls and darts, and on the other hand, eagle warriors preferred thrusting spears. However, in practice, the split was not clear, and other military groups used these weapons.

The Aztecs' most important weapon was the macuahuitl — a wooden sword lined with sharp obsidian blades, held together with a sticky bitumen glue. Most were about three and a half feet long, but some were so big that soldiers had to use both hands to swing them. This weapon was so popular that it spread throughout Mesoamerica. This sword-like weapon is so popular that even modern culture ties it back to the Aztecs and their warriors. It is featured in video games such as Assassin's Creed Liberation, where the player can wield the weapon with both hands, and in the Mortal Kombat series, where an Aztec warrior, Kotal Kahn, wields such a sword.

== Battle tactics ==
Troop movement and control were crucial aspects of battle for the Aztecs, leading to the development of a strategy to attack during the day. Most battles would begin at dawn and carry on throughout the day, and if the battle did not end by sundown, the army would disengage. Although it was not very common to battle during the night, it would only be carried out under certain exceptions, such as small raids and nearby targets. Some wars took place with the sole purpose of capturing prisoners for human sacrifices; these were called 'Flower Wars', a term derived from the Nahuatl word 'xochiyaoyotl', which referred to the ritualistic nature of these conflicts.

== See also ==
- Aztec warfare
- Jaguars in Mesoamerican cultures
