= Macuahuitl =

Weapon used by pre-Columbian Mesoamericans

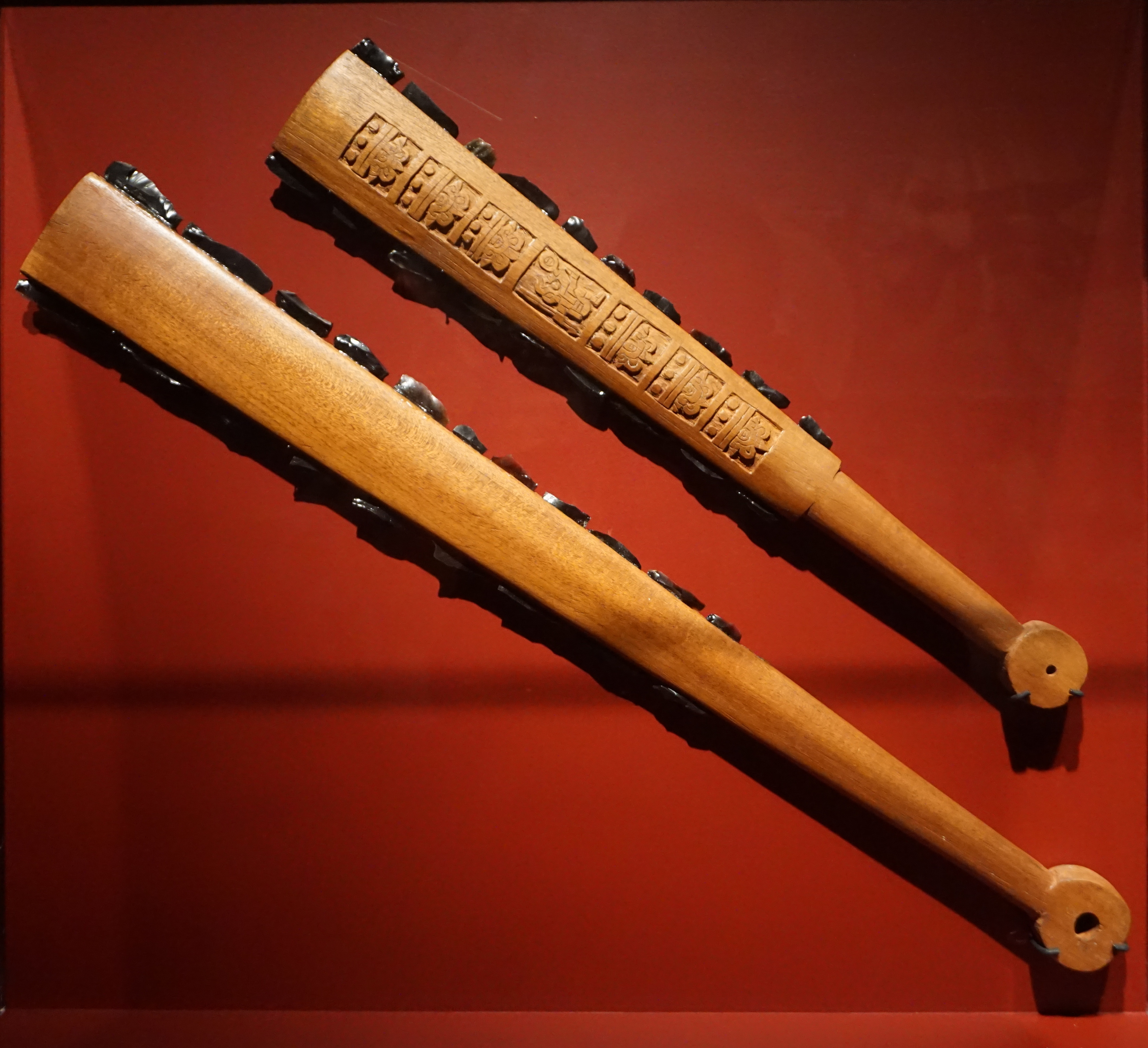
- A modern recreation of two ceremonial macuahuitl based on codices.
- Type: Sword
- Place of origin: Mexico

Service history
- In service: Formative stage to Post-Classic stage (1000 BCE–AD 1570)
- Used by: Mesoamerican civilizations, including Aztecs; Indian auxiliaries of Spain
- Wars: Aztec expansionism, Mesoamerican wars Spanish conquest of the Aztec Empire

Specifications
- Mass: 2.0–3.0 kg (4.4–6.6 lb)
- Length: 90–120 cm (35–47 in)
- Blade type: Straight, thick, double-edged, tapered
- Hilt type: Double-handed swept
- Scabbard/sheath: Unknown
- Head type: Trapezoidal
- Haft type: Straight, wood covered by leather

A macuahuitl (Note: /məˈkwɑːwɪt(əl)/ mə-KWAH-wit(l); Classical Nahuatl: māccuahuitl [maːkˈkʷawit͡ɬ], pl. māccuahuimeh) is a Mesoamerican weapon consisting of a wooden sword with several embedded obsidian blades. The name is derived from the Nahuatl language and means "hand-wood". Its sides are embedded with prismatic blades traditionally made from obsidian, which is capable of producing an edge sharper than high quality steel razor blades. The macuahuitl was a standard close-combat weapon.

Use of the macuahuitl as a weapon is attested from the first millennium CE, although specimens can be found in art dating to at least pre-classic times. By the time of the Spanish conquest, the macuahuitl was widely distributed in Mesoamerica. The weapon was used by different civilizations, including the Aztec (Mexicas), Olmec, Maya, Mixtec, Toltec, and Tarascans.

At least two examples of this weapon, allegedly three, survived the conquest of the Aztec Empire and are documented in modern literature: one was part of the Royal Armoury of Madrid until it was destroyed by a fire in 1884. Another two were excavated within Mexico City in the 20th century, though only one has subsequently been displayed to the public and is well-documented. The oldest replica is a macuahuitl created by the medievalist Achille Jubinal in the 19th century.

As a result of their scarcity, most of what is known about the macuahuitl comes from contemporaneous accounts and illustrations that date to the 16th century and earlier.

== Description ==
The macuahuitl (Classical Nahuatl: māccuahuitl (other orthographic variants include maquahuitl and mākkwawitl and mācquahuitl; plural māccuahuimeh), a type of macana, was a common weapon used by Aztec military forces and other cultures of central Mexico. It was noted during the 16th century Spanish conquest of the region. Other military equipment recorded includes the chīmalli (chīmalli, [t͡ʃiˈmalːi]) (shield), the bow (tlahuītōlli, [t͡ɬaʔwiːˈtoːlːi]), and the spear-thrower (ahtlatl, [ˈaʔt͡ɬat͡ɬ]). Its sides are embedded with prismatic blades traditionally made from obsidian (volcanic glass); obsidian is capable of producing an edge sharper than high-quality steel razor blades.

It was capable of inflicting serious lacerations from the rows of obsidian blades embedded in its sides. These could be knapped into blades or spikes, or into a circular design that looked like scales. The macuahuitl is not specifically a sword or a club, although it approximates a European broadsword. Historian John Pohl defines the weapon as a "kind of a saw sword".

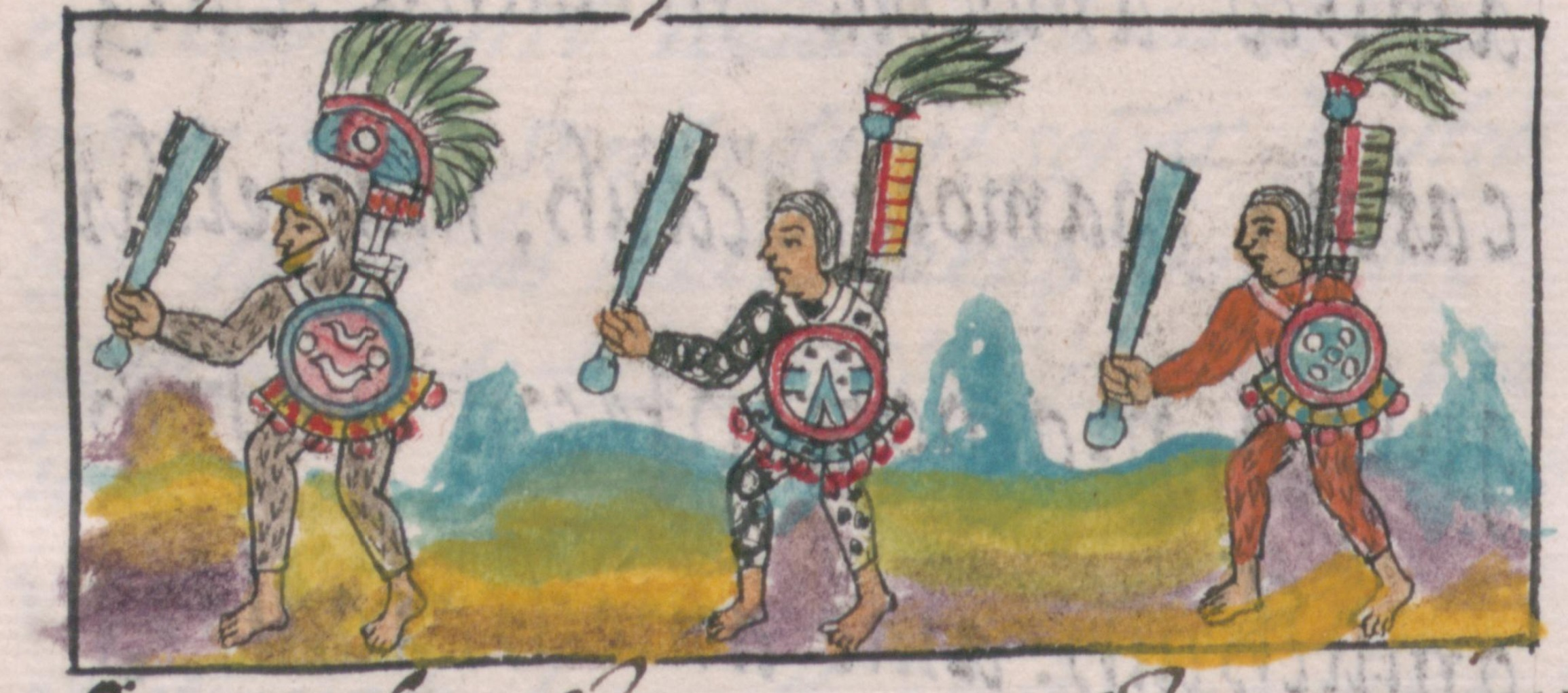
Aztec warriors as shown in the 16th-century Florentine Codex (Vol. IX). Each warrior is brandishing a macuahuitl.

According to conquistador Bernal Díaz del Castillo, the macuahuitl was 0.91 to 1.22 m long, and 75 mm wide, with a groove along either edge, into which sharp-edged pieces of flint or obsidian were inserted and firmly fixed with an adhesive. Based on his research, historian John Pohl indicates that the length was just over a meter, although other models were larger, and intended for use with both hands.

According to the research of historian Marco Cervera Obregón, the sharp pieces of obsidian, each about 3 cm long, were attached to the flat paddle with a natural adhesive, bitumen.

The rows of obsidian blades were sometimes discontinuous, leaving gaps along the side, while at other times the rows were set close together and formed a single edge. It was noted by the Spanish that the macuahuitl was so cleverly constructed that the blades could be neither pulled out nor broken. The macuahuitl was made with either a one-handed or two-handed grip, as well as in rectangular, ovoid, or pointed forms. Two-handed macuahuitl have been described as being "as tall as a man".

== Typology ==
According to National School of Anthropology and History (ENAH) archaeologist Marco Cervera Obregón, there were two versions of this weapon: The macuahuitl, about 70 to 80 centimetres (28 to 31 in) long with six to eight blades on each side; and the mācuāhuitzōctli, a smaller club about 50 centimetres (20 in) long with only four obsidian blades.

== Specimens ==
According to Ross Hassig, the last authentic macuahuitl was destroyed in 1884 in a fire in the Real Armería in Madrid, where it was housed beside the last tepoztopilli. However, according to Marco Cervera Obregón, there is supposedly a second specimen, a 50cm macuahuilzoctli variant, recovered in the 1960s at the corner of Tacuba and Allende in excavations ahead of the construction of Line 1 and 2 of the Mexico City subway, which is now stored in the archives of Museo Nacional de Antropología, but it is possibly lost.

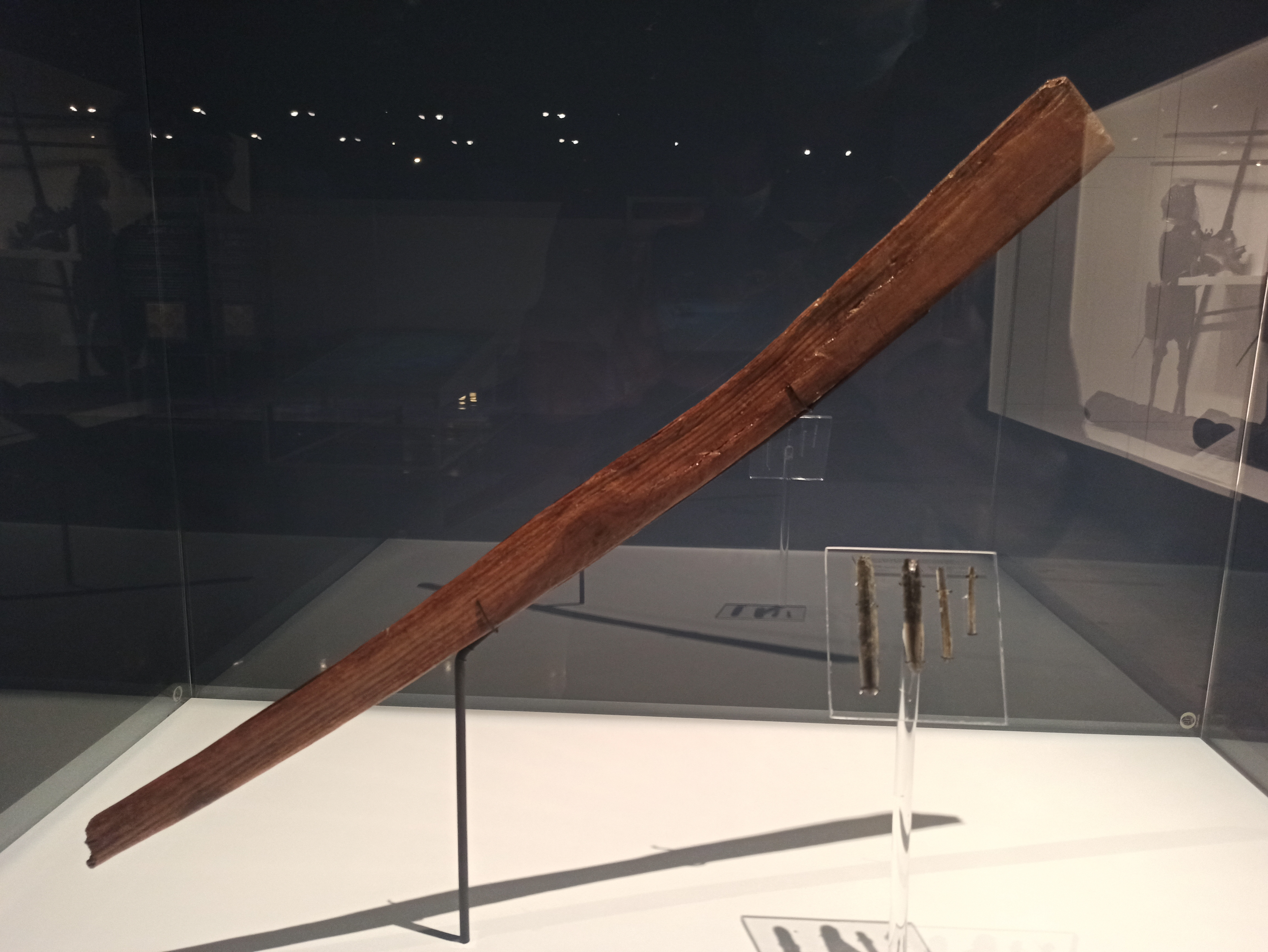
Surviving (though heavily damaged) macuahuitl excavated from San Marcos Street, on display in the Museo del Templo Mayor for the "Tenochtitlan y Tlatelolco: a 500 años de su caída" exhibit

A third specimen was displayed from 2021 to March 2022 at the Museo del Templo Mayor for the exhibition "Tenochtitlan y Tlatelolco. A 500 años de su caída" at the Museo del Templo Mayor in Mexico City, along with an atlatl. This specimen, badly damaged from both time and the method used to protect the wood by researchers, was recovered in archeological excavations at San Marcos Street from November 1993 to March 1994 by Dr. Juana Moreno Hernández.

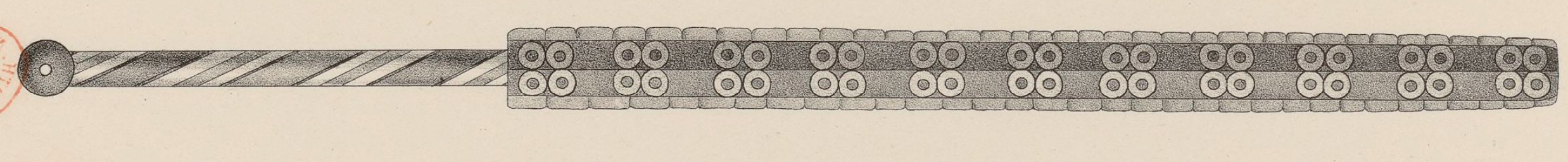
A drawing from the Catalog of the Royal Armoury of Madrid by the medievalist Achille Jubinal in the 19th century. The original specimen was destroyed by a fire in 1884.

== Origins and distribution ==
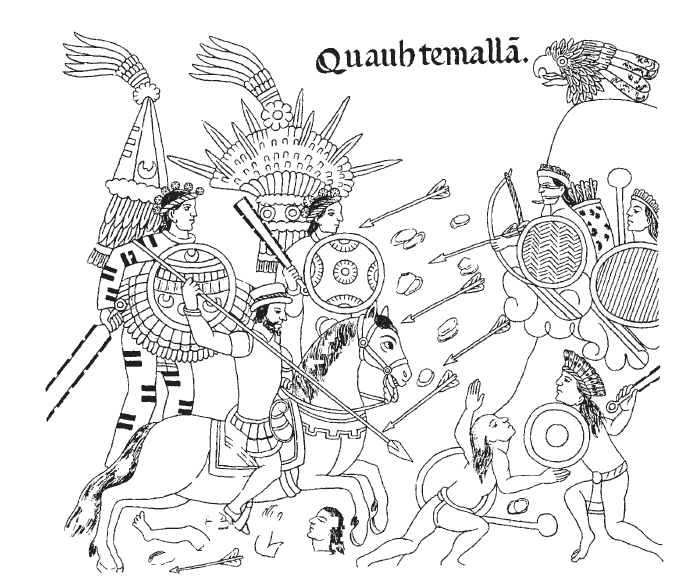
Lienzo de Tlaxcala depiction of a battle during the Spanish conquest of Guatemala. Both Spanish-led Indian auxiliaries (left) as well as Maya (right) wield māccuahuimeh.

The macuahuitl predates the Aztecs. Tools made from obsidian fragments were used by some of the earliest Mesoamericans. Obsidian used in ceramic vessels has been found at Aztec sites. Obsidian cutting knives, sickles, scrapers, drills, razors, and arrow points have also been found. Several obsidian mines were close to the Aztec civilizations in the Valley of Mexico as well as in the mountains north of the valley. Among these were the Sierra de las Navajas (Razor Mountains), named after their obsidian deposits. Use of the macuahuitl as a weapon is attested from the 1st millennium CE. A Mayan carving at Chichen Itza shows a warrior holding a macuahuitl, depicted as a club having separate blades sticking out from each side. In a mural, a warrior holds a club with many blades on one side and one sharp point on the other, also a possible variant of the macuahuitl. Some attestations of a type of macuahuitl are also present dating to Olmec times.

By the time of the Spanish conquest, the macuahuitl was widely distributed in Mesoamerica, with records of its use by the Aztecs, Mixtecs, Tarascans, Toltecs and others. It was also commonly used by the Indian auxiliaries of Spain, though they favored Spanish swords. As Mesoamericans in Spanish service needed a special permission to carry European arms, metal swords brought Indian auxiliaries more prestige than māccuahuimeh in the eyes of Europeans as well as natives.

== Effectiveness ==
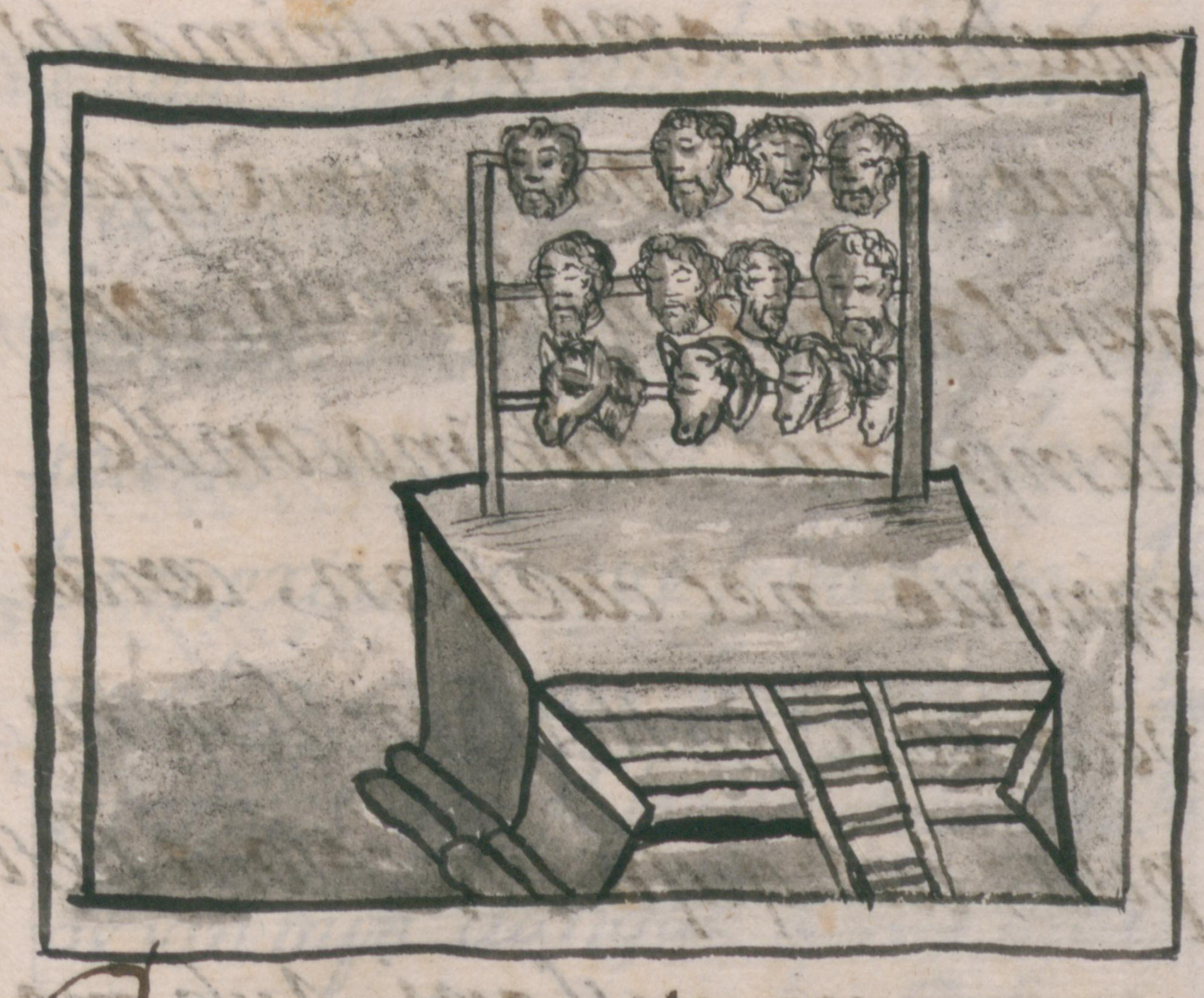
The Twelfth Book of the Florentine Codex shows the heads of captured Spanish soldiers and their horses displayed on a tzompantli in front of the Temple of Huitzilopochtli

The macuahuitl was sharp enough to decapitate a man. An account by Bernal Díaz del Castillo, one of Hernán Cortés's conquistadors, describes its effectiveness against mounted lancers:

Pedro de Morón was a very good horseman, and as he charged with three other horsemen into the ranks of the enemy the Indians seized hold of his lance and he was not able to drag it away, and others gave him cuts with their broadswords, and wounded him badly, and then they slashed at the mare, and cut his head off at the neck and he fell dead.

Another account by a companion of Cortés known as The Anonymous Conqueror tells a similar story of its effectiveness:

They have swords of this kind – of wood made like a two-handed sword, but with the hilt not so long; about three fingers in breadth. The edges are grooved, and in the grooves they insert stone knives, that cut like a Toledo blade. I saw one day an Indian fighting with a mounted man, and the Indian gave the horse of his antagonist such a blow in the breast that he opened it to the entrails, and it fell dead on the spot. And the same day I saw another Indian give another horse a blow in the neck, that stretched it dead at his feet.

— "Offensive and Defensive Arms", page 23

Another account by Francisco de Aguilar reads:

They used ... cudgels and swords and a great many bows and arrows ... One Indian at a single stroke cut open the whole neck of Cristóbal de Olid's horse, killing the horse. The Indian on the other side slashed at the second horseman and the blow cut through the horse's pastern, whereupon this horse also fell dead. As soon as this sentry gave the alarm, they all ran out with their weapons to cut us off, following us with great fury, shooting arrows, spears and stones, and wounding us with their swords. Here many Spaniards fell, some dead and some wounded, and others without any injury who fainted away from fright.

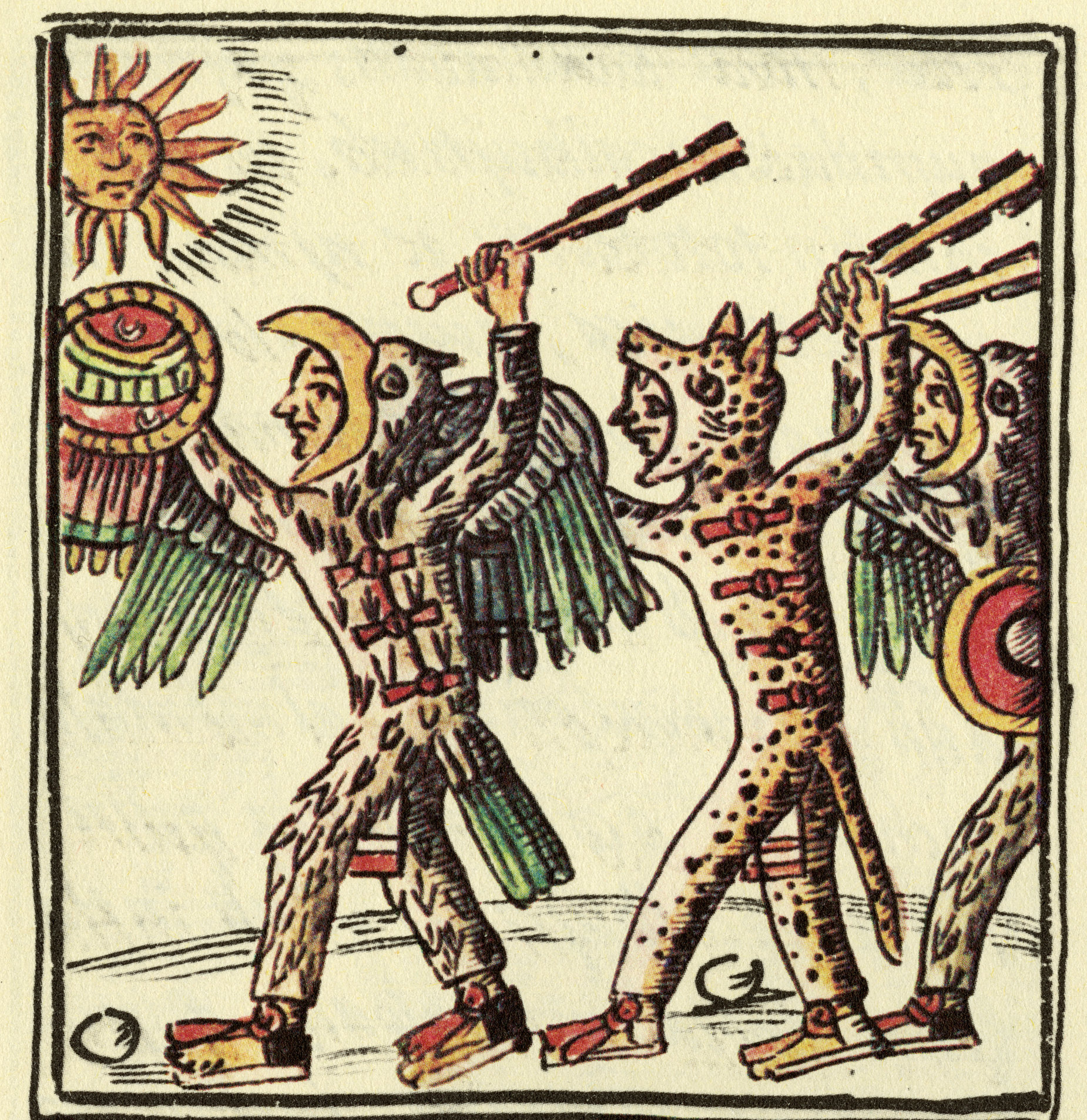
This drawing, from the 16th-century Florentine Codex, shows Aztec warriors brandishing māccuahuimeh

Given the importance of human sacrifice in Nahua cultures, their warfare styles, particularly those of the Aztec and Maya, placed a premium on the capture of enemy warriors for live sacrifice. Advancement into the elite cuāuhocēlōtl warrior societies of the Aztec, for example, required taking 20 live captives from the battlefield. The macuahuitl thus shows several features designed to make it a useful tool for capturing prisoners: fitting spaced instead of contiguous blades, as seen in many codex illustrations, would intentionally limit the wound depth from a single blow, and the heavy wooden construction allows weakened opponents to be easily clubbed unconscious with the flat side of the weapon. The art of disabling opponents using an un-bladed macuahuitl as a sparring club was taught from a young age in the Aztec Tēlpochcalli schools.

The macuahuitl had many drawbacks in combat versus European steel swords. Despite being sharper, prismatic obsidian is also considerably more brittle than steel; obsidian blades of the type used on the macuahuitl tended to shatter on impact with other obsidian blades, steel swords or plate armour. Obsidian blades also have difficulty penetrating European mail (although the macuahuitl is able to deal blunt force trauma). The thin, replaceable blades used on the macuahuitl were easily dulled or chipped by repeated impacts on bone or wood, making artful use of the weapon critical. It takes more time to lift and swing a club than it does to thrust with a sword. More space is needed as well, so warriors advanced in loose formations and fought in single combat.

== Experimental archaeology ==
Replicas of the macuahuitl have been produced and tested against sides of beef for documentary shows on the History and Discovery channels, to demonstrate the effectiveness of this weapon. On the History show Warriors, special forces operator and martial artist Terry Schappert was injured while fencing with a macuahuitl; the back of his left leg received a cut as the result of a back-swing motion.

For SpikeTV's reality program Deadliest Warrior a replica was created and tested against a model of a horse's head created using a horse's skeleton and ballistics gel. Actor and martial artist Éder Saúl López was able to decapitate the model, but it took three swings. Blows from the replica macuahuitl were most effective when it was swung and then dragged backward upon impact, creating a sawing motion. This led Max Geiger, the computer programmer of the series, to refer to the weapon as "the obsidian chainsaw". This may have been due to the unrefined obsidian cutting edges of the weapon used in the show, compared with more finely made prismatic obsidian blades, as in the Madrid specimen.

== See also ==
- Aztec warfare
- Leiomano
- Macana
- Maya warfare
- Obsidian use in Mesoamerica
