= Eagle warrior =

Special class of infantry in the Aztec Army

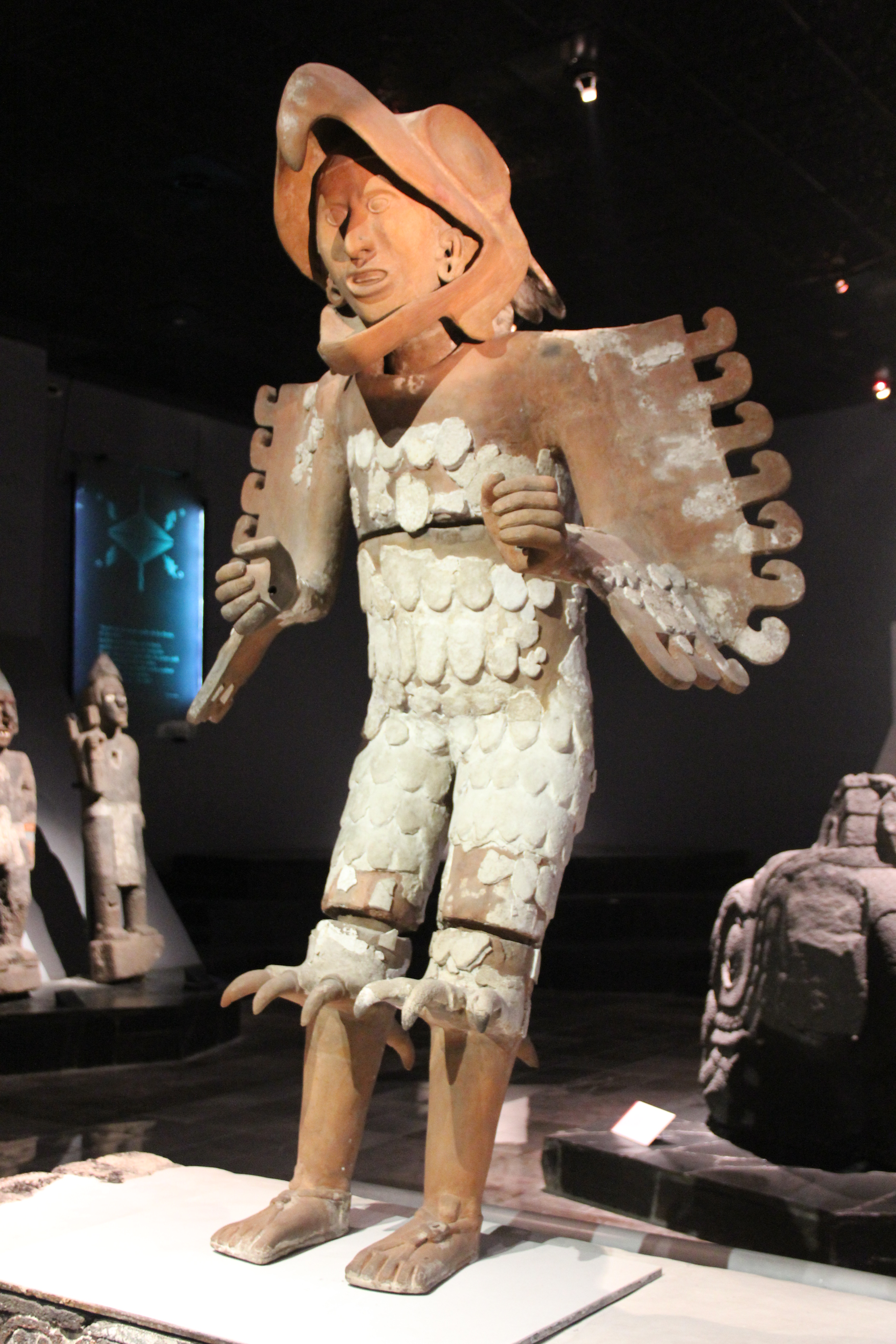
The statue of an eagle warrior (cuāuhtli), found in the House of Eagles, housed in the museum of the Templo Mayor of Tenochtitlan

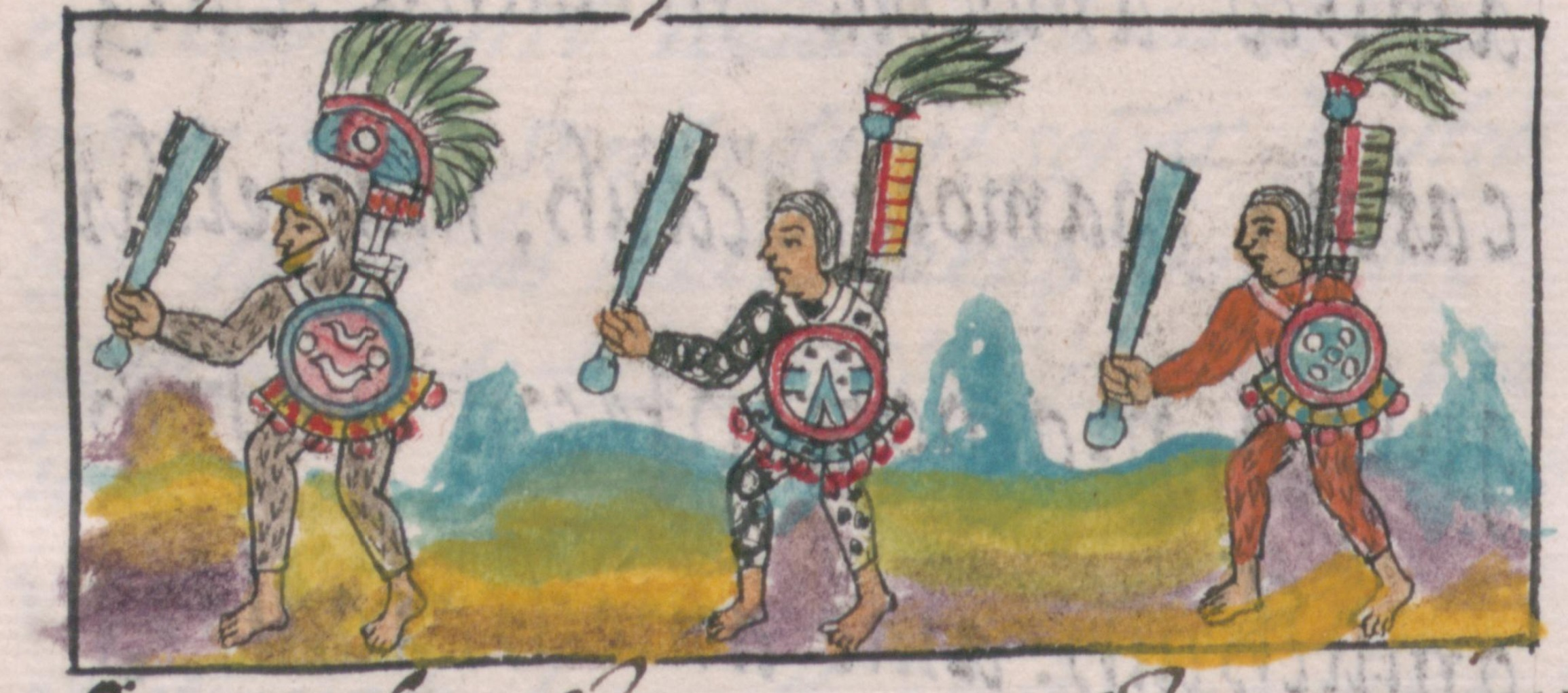
An Eagle warrior (left) depicted holding a macuahuitl in the Florentine Codex

Eagle warriors or eagle knights (Classical Nahuatl: cuāuhtli [ˈkʷaːʍtɬi] (singular) or cuāuhmeh [ˈkʷaːʍmeʔ] (plural)) were a special class of infantry soldier in the Aztec army, one of the two leading military special forces orders in Aztec society, the other being the Jaguar warriors. They were a type of Aztec warrior called a cuāuhocēlōtl [kʷaːwoˈseːloːt͡ɬ]. The word cuāuhocēlōtl derives from the eagle warrior cuāuhtli and the jaguar warrior ocēlōtl [oˈseːloːt͡ɬ]. These military orders were made up of the bravest soldiers of noble birth and those who had taken the greatest number of prisoners in battle. Of all of the Aztec warriors, they were the most feared. Eagle warriors, along with the jaguar warriors, were the only such classes that did not restrict access solely to the nobility, as commoners or, in Nahuatl, "mācēhualli" (Nahuatl pronunciation: [maːseːwalːi]) were occasionally admitted for special merit.

The life of Aztec warriors was one of constant battle, and the primary purpose of this continual warfare was to take prisoners to be sacrificed to their gods. As the Aztec Empire expanded, however, the expansion of the empire in size and power became increasingly important.

In current culture, the eagle warrior is a representation of the Aztec culture, and therefore the Mexican tradition. Some companies use the eagle warrior as a symbol that denotes strength, aggressiveness, competitiveness, and remembrance of the ancient cultures of Mexico. Aeroméxico's logo, for instance, shows a cuāuhtli.

== Aztec society ==
The empire was composed of different social classes: kings (thought to be gods), nobles, generals, priests, peasants, and finally slaves. Politically, the society was based around the independent city-state, called an altepetl, composed of smaller divisions (calpulli), which were again usually composed of one or more extended kinship groups. Aztec society was highly complex and stratified, composed of several hierarchies. The society depended on a rather strict division between nobles and free commoners, both of which were themselves divided into elaborate hierarchies of social status, responsibilities, and power. A commoner would not have the same rights to land and dress code as a noble would, even down to regulating the materials they were allowed to use in their clothing. Economically the society was dependent on agriculture, and also to a large extent on warfare. Other economically important factors were commerce, long-distance and local, and a high degree of trade specialization.

== Rite of passage ==
All Aztec boys, both free commoners and nobility, learned about weaponry and warfare as part of their basic education. Until the age of fourteen, the education of children was in the hands of their parents, but was supervised by the authorities of their calpulli. Periodically, they attended their local temples, which tested their progress. However, only the best students could progress to become eagle warriors, as they are considered one of the nobility in Aztec society. At the age of 17, young Aztec men became warriors and entered formal military training. The recruits were expected to be brave and noble. Those who were of noble lineage also received training in religion, politics, or history by the priests. To achieve adult status, a young man had to capture his first prisoner.

Aztec warriors could move up in ranking by capturing enemies. One of the requirements to join the warriors is that they must capture at least four prisoners or great deeds (such as capturing foes to be used as sacrifices), they were eligible to become either a jaguar or eagle warrior.

== Weaponry and battledress ==
The warriors used a number of weapons, including an atlatl, spears and daggers. The Aztec blades (macuahuitl) were made by setting obsidian within wood. Firestones were flung at enemies using slings made of wool. Most Aztec weapons were intended to stun and capture opponents rather than to kill them.

The uniforms of eagle warriors signified both courage on the battlefield and physical strength. The Aztecs wore a lightweight close-fitting breastplate which suited the Mesoamerican climate. Their shields were brightly coloured and decorated with feathers. A warrior's legs would be covered with leather strips, an archaic version of greaves or shin guards. As headgear, eagle warriors wore the heads of eagles, including an open beak, and used eagle feathers as adornments.

The Eagle warrior's successes in battle were rewarded with access and permission to wear luxurious jewelry and materials. The quality of their jewelry was also based on hierarchy. They wore expensive materials like red ochre and headdresses made of quetzal feathers. The highest warriors were given chalchiuhtentetl by the ruler himself, which is a green stone lip plug, and cuetlaxnacochtli, which are leather earplugs.

Their slings were likely made from maguey fiber, either a type of ixtle from one of the agave type maguey plants such as henequen (Agave fourcroydes).

== Eagle warriors in society ==
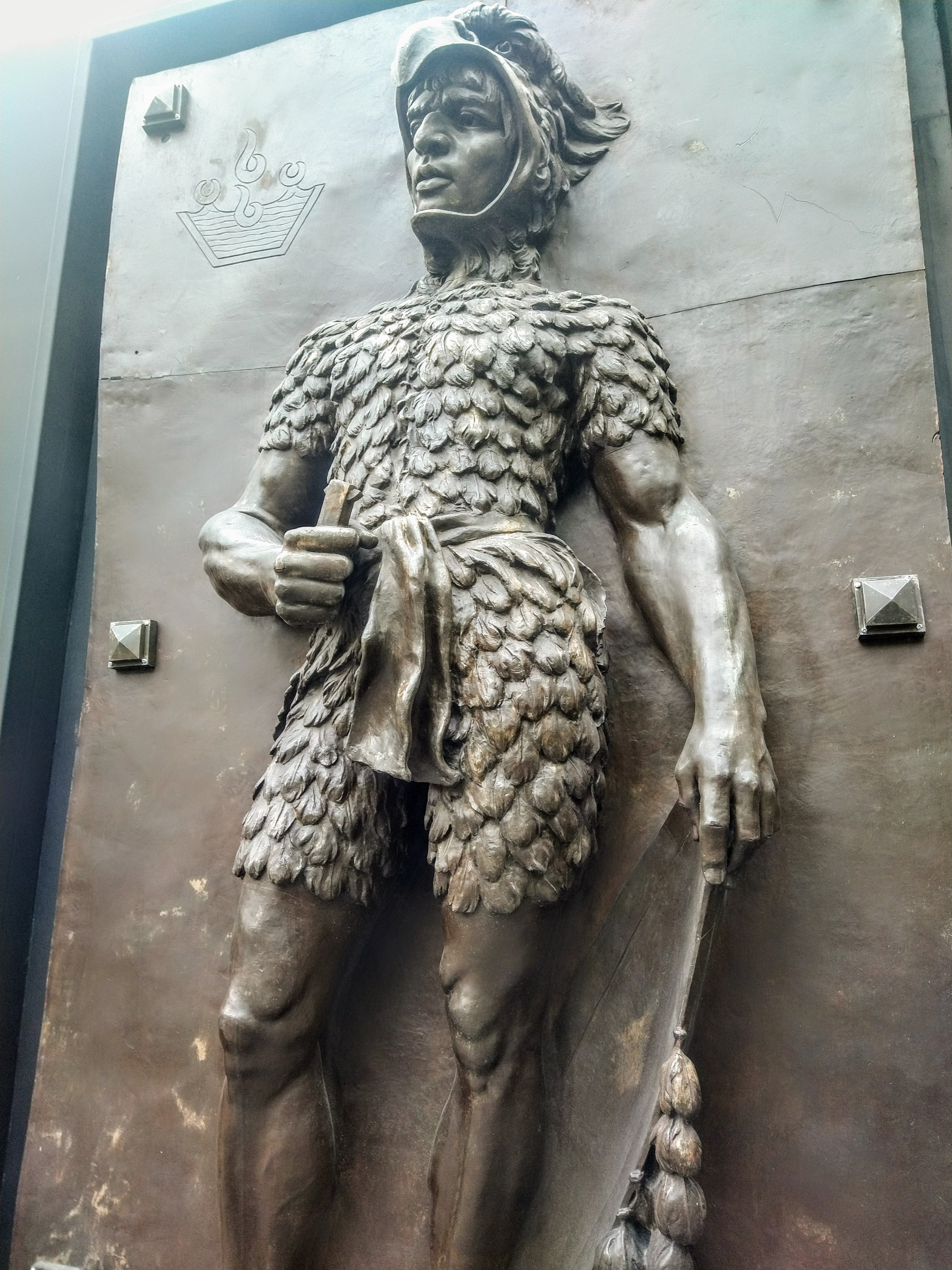
Bronze relief by Jesús Fructuoso Contreras depicting Cuitláhuac as an eagle warrior

The origin of the eagle and jaguar warriors stems from the self-less acts of two deities; Nanahuatzin, meaning Pimply One, and Tecuciztecatl, meaning Lord of Snails, who sacrificed themselves to bring life to the sun. They emerged from the fire transforming into an eagle and a jaguar. This cosmological belief solidifies the eagle warrior's higher position in society. This is reflected in their dress as well. The eagles were soldiers of the Sun, for the eagle was the symbol of the Sun. Eagle warriors dressed like eagles, adorning themselves with eagle feathers, and wearing headgear with an eagle head on it. The Eagle Warriors are among the highest ranking warriors in Aztec society. Sacrifice in Aztec society is extremely important, as they believe that it is their duty to nourish the sun through human blood. The warriors supply the captives they need to use for sacrifice. This relates back to the origin of the Eagle Warriors and their connection to the Divine.

Eagle and jaguar warriors were two of the only types of warriors who were recognized as having a full-time professional capacity. Thanks to their elite training and education, they were leaders and commanders both on and off the battlefield. On reaching this rank they were peers of nobles and other elite members of Aztec society, therefore the warrior's path was a way to raise one's social status in Aztec culture guaranteeing many of the same privileges as nobles. The graduate warrior was allowed to drink pulque, keep concubines, and dine at the royal palace. At a civic level, they would also become full-time warriors working for the city-state to protect merchants and police the city itself. Accordingly, they were the civil or police force of Aztec society. Due to these corps, the Aztecs were able to defeat the Spanish in La Noche Triste.

== Eagle Warrior Temple ==
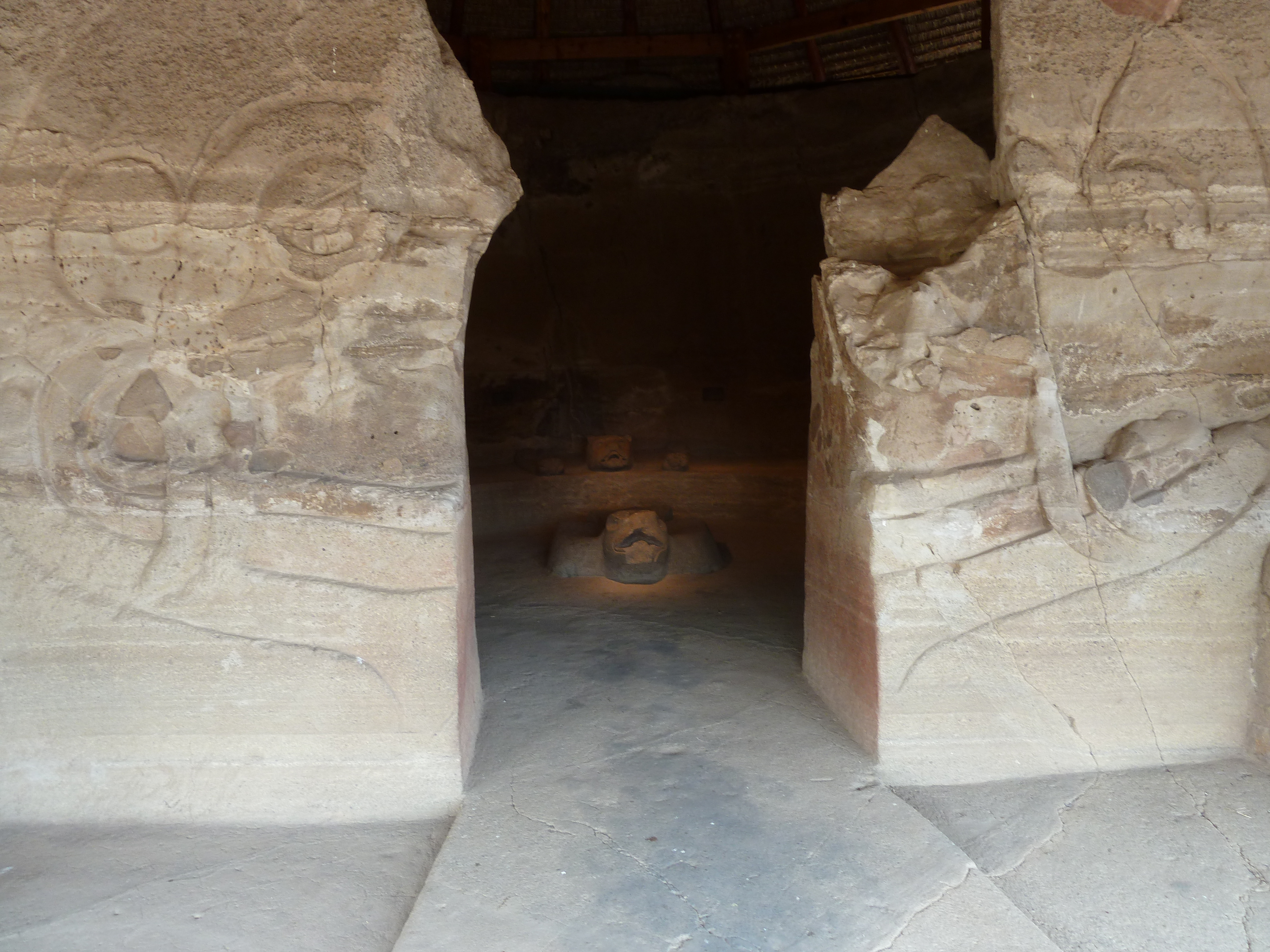
The entrance into the inner chamber of the Eagle Warriors Temple in Malinalco, Mexico

The Eagle Warrior Temple is located in Malinalco, Mexico. The temple sits upon a hill and is completely carved out of bedrock. The temple is a circular structure with an entrance containing 13 steps, and includes two jaguar sculptures. The entrance to the temple was a carved open mouth of an Aztec earth monster. The temple was situated next to the ruler's palace, serving as a headquarters for the Eagle Warriors and a place to plan combat strategies.

The temple has a long extended bench that covers half of its inner chamber. There are carved sculptures on the bench of eagles and a jaguar. In the center of the inner chamber, there is a giant carved eagle on the floor. Some believe the centre eagle would be used as an altar or throne. The surrounding buildings contained several murals depicting the life of a warrior. In addition, there were murals of dancing eagles and jaguars within structures in Malinalco.

== See also ==
- Aztec warfare
- Jaguar warrior
- Guecha warrior
