= Debitage =

Archeological term; material produced during the process of lithic reduction

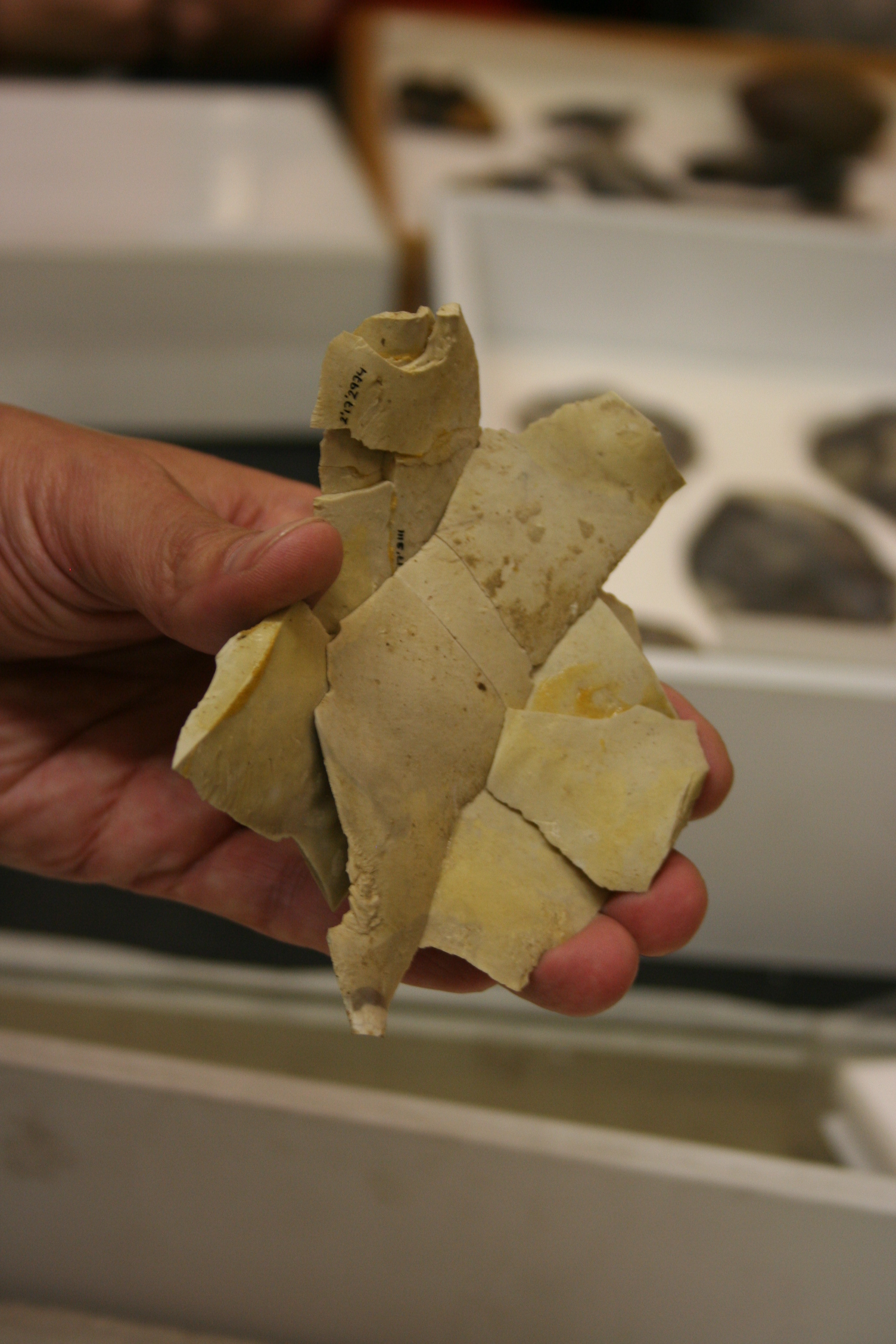
Example of lithic refitting

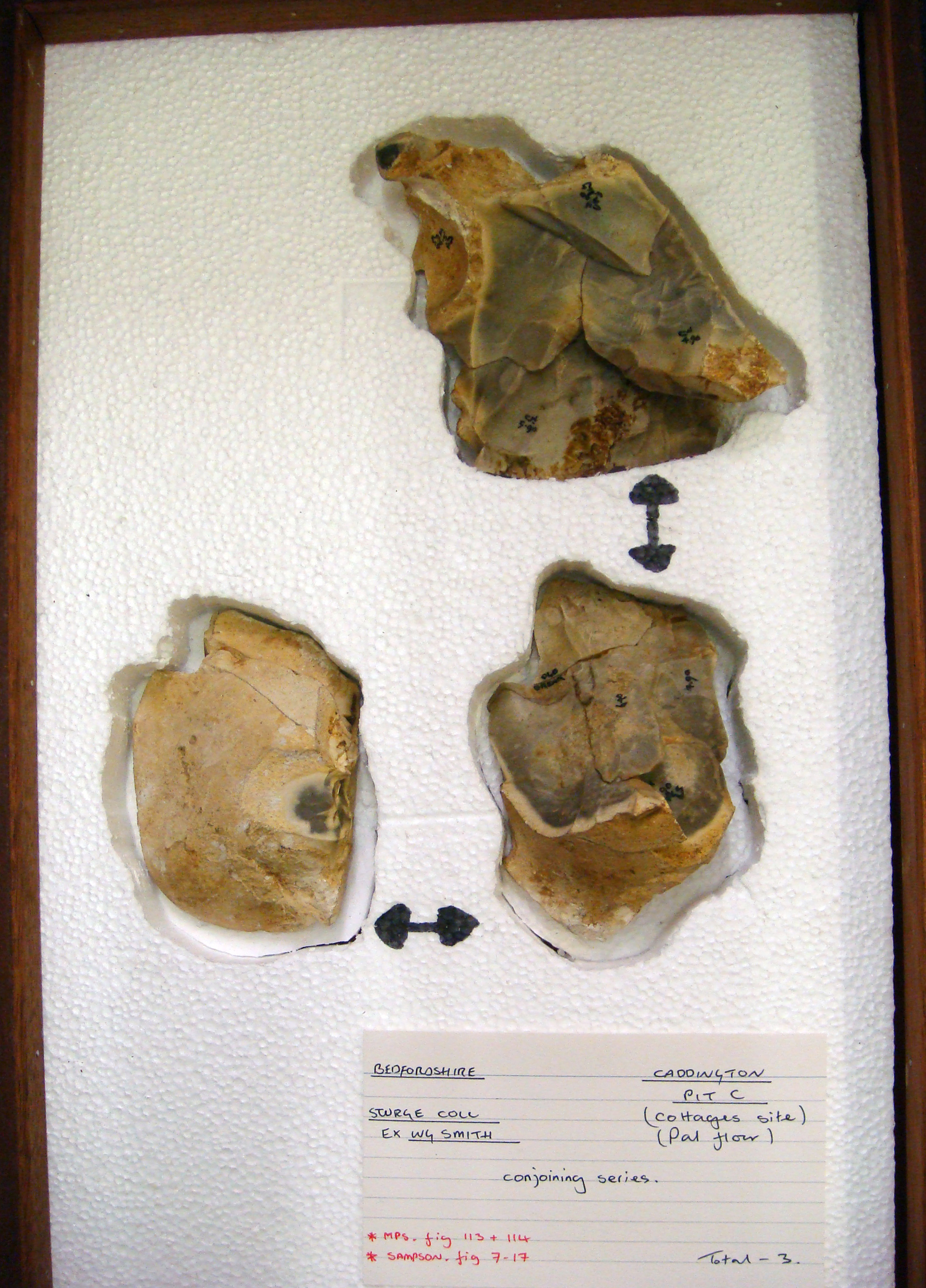
Series of refitted debris

In archaeology, debitage is all the material produced during the process of lithic reduction – the production of stone tools and weapons by knapping stone. This assemblage may include the different kinds of lithic flakes and lithic blades, but most often refers to the shatter and production debris, and production rejects.

== Debitage analysis ==
Debitage analysis, a sub-field of lithic analysis, considers the entire lithic waste assemblage. The analysis is undertaken by investigating differing patterns of debris morphology, size, and shape, among other things. This allows researchers to make more accurate assumptions regarding the purpose of the lithic reduction. Quarrying activities, core reduction, biface creation, tool manufacture, and retooling are believed to leave significantly different debitage assemblages. Lithic manufacture from a quarried source, or from found cobbles also leave different signatures. Some claim that they can determine the sort of tools used to create the debitage. Others feel it is possible to effectively estimate the work-hours represented, or the skill of the workers based on the nature of the debitage.

Debitage analysis of biface reduction can be used to determine what stage of reduction is represented in waste. Stahle and Dunn (1982) found that, as waste flake size decreases from initial to final stages in biface production, systematic changes in flake size can be used to identify stages of reduction in anonymous debitage samples through comparison with experimental assemblages. Use of Weibull distributions and least square analysis helped Stahle and Dunn confirm that this method can be used backward to estimate reduction stages of particular debitage frequencies. Other studies comparing the debitage of bifacial reduction during different stages has not yielded such positive results. Patterson (1990) was unable to distinguish between the stages of initial edging and secondary thinning using statistical analysis of 14 experimental assemblages.

The typological approach groups together lithics with similar manufacturing histories in order to emphasize patterns of manufacturing behavior (as in Sheets 1975). To use Sheets’ (1983:200) example, macroblades and prismatic blades were separated on the basis of their manufacture, in that the former was removed by percussion, while the latter was removed by a pressure technique. Casual, informal tools from unstandardized cores should be given scrutiny equal to that of formal tools from standardized core reduction.

The presence of cortex needs to be noted for all tool categories in all materials. The presence of cortex indicates the importation of an unworked nodule, with the first flakes both preparing the core by shaping and removing the roughened exterior of the cortex (Sheets 1978:9). The percentage frequency of cortex is an important statistic to help identify lithic production areas. A low incidence of cortex would indicate quarry preforming (cortex removed at the quarry, not at the site).

One specific type of debitage analysis is mass analysis. Mass analysis is based on analyzing debitage populations based on their size distribution across specified size grades. Ahler (1989) conducted an experimental replication under some technological settings and classified debitage into five groups according to their size, Discriminant analysis (by SPSS DISCRIMINANT function) was applied to compare mass analysis data sets for these five experimental data groups. He then compared the counts and weights of experimental samples with debris from two prehistoric workshop sites in western North Dakota. The result shows the experimental data sets can explain the technological composition of archaeological samples. Samples from several other sites also are applied this method and derive clear discriminant results. Especially in a specific function site, such as Legacy site, a Late Woodland age camp in the Missouri breaks, associated with bison kill/butchering, the low frequency of cortex and a specific flake ratio (G4:Gl-3) indicates a soft hammer small flake tool production, which is similar to experimental results. Although this process has been used in many studies, Andrefsky warns of the potential problems associated with the many assumptions made while employing this analysis. One in particular that he draws attention to is the possibility of differences in debitage populations based on individual variation of the artifact maker; in his example, three different knappers all using bipolar core reduction have different percentages of size grade 3 debitage (5.2%, 13.2%, and 10.2%). These differences indicate that individual variation can be influential in the size distribution of debitage and should be kept in mind if mass analysis is being employed. The reason for which Andrefsky believes mass analysis have become so popular is due to the process's ease of use and speed. Andrefsky even quotes Ahler that between individual specimen analysis and mass analysis, mass analysis has the advantage because of four reasons: 1) biases are eliminated because mass analysis looks at the entire assemblage; both completed and fractured. 2) Because mass analysis doesn't require looking at each artifact, it is very rapid and efficient. 3) debitage biases based on the sample's size are reduced since it merely captures different specimen sizes. 4) the method is highly objective and can be learned by virtually anyone.

In addition, various attributes can be used for statistical and numerical methods which are currently used for debitage analysis. The attributes divides in the two ways, metric and non-metric. In the metric attributes, length, mid width, max width, platform length, platform width, bulb thickness, other point of thickness, platform angle and weight are included. And for the non-metric attributes, platform configuration, platform facet count, % dorsal cortex, dorsal scar count, remained portion, and size grade can be chosen. Bradbury and Carr specifically point to the continuum model to analyze flakes and these listed variables to try to determine which flake debris were caused by different actions (core reduction, tool making, etc.)

Sullivan and Rozen (1985) introduced a method of classifying debitage into four categories: complete flakes, broken (proximal) flakes, flake fragments (medial-distal flakes), and fragments that are unable to be oriented. Some success has been shown in using this classification to differentiate between different reduction strategies. Using discriminant analysis and Sullivan and Rozen's system to classify debitage, Austin (1997) was able to correctly distinguish between patterned tool and core reduction techniques for 93.33% of his experimental assemblages. Austin also tested how this typology would operate with mixed assemblages. He found that in an assemblage where there is a mixture of debitage from a patterned tool and core reduction, it is likely to be classified as a patterned tool assemblage, if the core debitage represents 50% or less of the total assemblage. Austin pointed out many factors that could change the characteristics of debitage (post-depositional processes, differences in raw material, etc.) and suggested that his method should be used in a preliminary fashion.

== Refitting ==
Debitage refitting is a process whereby the collected assemblages of debitage are painstakingly put back together, like pieces in a puzzle. This can sometimes indicate the nature of the tools being produced, although missing pieces are a significant problem. More often, debitage refitting is used to learn how rocks were moved during the lithic manufacture process. This can sometimes indicate work areas, division of labor, or trade routes.

== Sourcing ==
Debitage sourcing looks at the physical properties of the worked stone in an attempt to determine where on the earth it was obtained. This may require sophisticated equipment, and destructive testing, but even a visual inspection can provide a general idea. Sourcing is assumed to provide information about trade, or travel routes.

== Dating ==
Some debitage material has been examined in an effort to obtain dates. Since debitage is plentiful, and individual specimens are usually not diagnostic, they can often undergo destructive analysis that would not be suitable for other artifacts. Results have been promising, but not spectacular. Obsidian and cryptocrystalline silicates appear to be the most promising materials for destructive analysis.

Obsidian, as a natural glass material, is peculiar because when it is exposed to water, the surface develops a patinated layer of hydrated perlite. Old fractures therefore have thicker layers of patina than more recent flake scars. As the rate of hydration is determined by factors such as moisture content, temperature, and the chemical composition of the obsidian, this method cannot provide absolute dates. However, this method has the major advantage of relying on obsidian flaking as the activating cause in this dating scheme.

Cryptocrystalline silicates, such as flint and chert, are sometimes heat-treated in order to improve the flaking properties of the material. This heating can be used as a zeroing point, and the date since the material was last heated can be established through fission track counts, thermoluminescence, or, in some rare cases, paleomagnetism. These provide absolute dates. Unfortunately, not all such tool stones were heat-treated, and not all heat-treatment is due to human agency. Forest fires are one way that stones can be heat-treated without human action.

== See also ==
- Hammerstone
- Midden
