= Uniface =

Stone hand-tool

In archaeology, a uniface is a specific type of stone tool that has been flaked on one surface only. There are two general classes of uniface tools: modified flakes and formalized tools, which display deliberate, systematic modification of the marginal edges, evidently formed for a specific purpose.

== Modified flakes ==
While many worked stone tools can be technically designated as "modified flakes," for lithic analysis purposes a modified flake is usually defined as a lithic flake with one or more edges that were altered either through opportunistic use or through nonsystematic retouching; it is often difficult to identify the process that produced the observed edge. Opportunistic use occurs when a sharp flake is used as-is, without edge-modification. Nonsystematic retouching occurs when pressure flaking is used to remove a few trimming flakes from the edge, in no discernible or extensive pattern.

== Formalized uniface tools ==
Some unifaces are characterized by systematic edge retouch, which was used to thin, straighten, sharpen, and smooth an artifact's edge, and were usually created with a specific purpose in mind. These formalized unifaces were often intended for woodworking, cutting, chopping, or hide-working purposes, and generally fall into easily classifiable types. While the following discussion does not cover some specialized types of unifaces, it does include the most common types.

Scrapers are unifacial tools that were used either for hideworking or woodworking. Whereas this term is often used for any unifacially flaked tool that defies classification, most lithic analysts maintain that the only true scrapers are defined on the base of use-wear, and are usually worked at their distal ends—i.e., "end scrapers." Other scrapers include the so-called "side scrapers." Most scrapers are either oval or blade-like in shape. The working edges of scrapers tend to be convex, and many have trimmed and dulled lateral edges to facilitate hafting. One important variety of scraper is the thumbnail scraper, a scraper shaped much like its namesake. This scraper type is common at Paleo-Indian sites.

Gouges (or adzes) may be either bifacial or unifacial, and are defined as tools with chisel-like working edges that were used for woodworking purposes; they may also have been used to remove marrow from bones. Gouges are generally triangular in shape, with the working edge—characteristically steep-angled—appearing at the wide base of the triangle. The opposite edge, at the point of the triangle, was the hafted end; the tool itself was generally hafted at right angles to the handle.

Denticulate tools display edges that are worked into a multiply notched shape, much like the toothed edge of a saw. Indeed, these tools might have been used as saws, more likely for meat processing than for wood. It is possible, however, that some or all of these notches were used for smoothing wooden shafts or for similar purposes.
