= Terry Schappert =

American special forces soldier (born 1965)

- Born: December 4, 1965 (age 60); New York City
- Military career
- Allegiance: United States
- Branch: United States Army
- Service years: 1988–1997, 2001–2017
- Rank: Master Sergeant
- Units: 82nd Airborne Division; 19th Special Forces Group
- Conflicts: Persian Gulf War; Operation Joint Endeavor; Operation Iraqi Freedom; Global war on terror
- Awards: Combat Infantryman Badge; Special Forces Tab; Ranger Tab; Parachutist Badge; Freefall Parachutist Badge; Special Operations Diver Badge; Army Commendation Medal; Army Achievement Medal; Army Good Conduct Medal; Minnesota Medal for Merit; Army Reserve Good Conduct Medal; Armed Forces Reserve Medal (Bronze Hourglass device); NCO Professional Development Ribbon; Armed Forces Expeditionary Medal; Global War on Terrorism Expeditionary Medal; Army Service Ribbon; Kuwait Liberation Medal (Kuwait)
- Other work: TV host, martial artist, actor
- Website: www.terryschappert.com

Terry Schappert is a United States Army National Guard Special Forces veteran and martial artist who is a periodic commentator on FOX News, who hosted the 2009 show Warriors on the History Channel. He left active duty before 9/11, but continues to serve in the Army National Guard. He has deployed three times since as a Guardsman. He has also had minor acting roles. He hosted a special during the Discovery Channel's Shark Week where he demonstrated ways in which to survive a shark attack. He also makes occasional guest appearances on The Greg Gutfeld Show and previously made appearances on Red Eye w/ Greg Gutfeld. He appeared on the cast of Dude, You're Screwed on the Discovery Channel.

== Early life ==
He is a graduate of the University of North Carolina Wilmington (UNCW) with a B.A. in Anthropology, where he was a member of the Sigma Alpha Epsilon fraternity.

At UNCW, Schappert borrowed military books about the Vietnam War from his friend who was a ROTC cadet. After seeing a picture of a MACV-SOG soldier, Schappert became interested in becoming a Green Beret.

== Military service ==
A few months after he graduated from UNCW, Schappert enlisted in the United States Army in 1988. He was assigned to the 82nd Airborne Division right after basic training. With his degree, he was selected to enter Officer Candidate School, however Schappert rejected the offer as he was more interested in ground forces. While assigned to a recon squad, he completed Ranger School. After serving in the Persian Gulf War, Schappert moved on to his ultimate challenge; becoming a Green Beret.

Schappert spent five years as a Special Forces Medical Sergeant. He was involved in Operation Joint Endeavor before he left active duty in 1997. He then pursued an acting career.

After 9/11, Schappert re-enlisted as Special Forces Combat Medic in the National Guard 19th Special Forces Group. He served in Operation Iraqi Freedom and the war on terror before he retired in 2017.

== Television career ==
In February 2017 Schappert appeared on television in the United Kingdom where he starred in an episode of the BBC television show Special Forces: Ultimate Hell Week. During the episode Schappert directs the civilian contestants through a number of Green Beret inspired training exercises within a 48-hour period in South Africa.

In 2016 Terry became the host of Hollywood Weapons Fact or Fiction. A show dedicated to testing scenes from TV shows and movies where a weapon is used in a way that seems unbelievable. Terry and his co-host Larry Zanoff, a Hollywood prop master and armourer, put these scenes to the test. The show originated on The OUTDOOR Channel and now has moved to Netflix.
