= Warriors (2009 TV series) =

- Genre: Documentary
- Presented by: Terry Schappert
- Country of origin: United States
- Original language: English
- No. of series: 1
- No. of episodes: 11

Production
- Running time: 60 minutes

Original release
- Network: History Channel
- Release: March 9, 2009

Warriors is an American documentary series that aired on the History Channel in the United States. The show is hosted by Terry Schappert, a sergeant in the United States Army Special Forces. The show focuses on historical warrior cultures, major battles, and military leaders.

== Format ==
Each episode focuses on Schappert immersing himself in a different warrior group. He talks with historians and weapons experts, samples the armor and equipment, and practices with their weaponry, all in order to learn each group's techniques and frame of mind. Each episode usually displayed a reenactment of a major "signature battle" of the warrior culture being presented.

== Episode list ==
=== "Braveheart" ===
First shown 3 Aug. 2008.

=== "Maya Armageddon" ===
This episode takes us to the little-known world of the Mayan Empire. It delves into the culture, unique weaponry (like the atlatl and obsidian club), and scientific achievements of the Mayans.

=== "Barbarian Massacre" ===
Terry Schappert travels to Germany to learn more about Arminius, a German war chief that grew up with the Romans and studied their tactics. Arminius was able to use the Romans' own tactics against them in one of Rome's greatest defeats: the Battle of the Teutoburg Forest.

=== "Viking Terror" ===
Host Terry Schappert studies the tactics of the "Hell's Angels of the Middle Ages." The host studies the harsh Nordic life, raiding tactics and sailing techniques of the Vikings. The show culminates in the Viking-Saxon showdown at the Battle of Maldon.

=== "Knight Fight" ===
Host Terry Schappert travels to France to study the Battle at Agincourt. He looks into the tactics of the heavily armored French Knights versus the lightly armored, fast moving expeditionary army of Henry V and his secret weapon, the English Longbow.

=== "Samurai Showdown" ===
Terry Schappert travels to Japan and studies the honor code of the Samurai, or Bushido. He also studies the lifestyle, weaponry, tactics, and psyche of the Samurai. He also retraces the steps of the most famous ronin samurai, Miyamoto Musashi.

=== "The Last Crusaders" ===
The rising Ottoman Empire attempts to conquer all Mediterranean trade routes, but the tiny island of Malta stands in its way. This island is also home to the fiercest knights, the Order of St. John, or Knights Hospitaller. 8,000 Knights and native Maltese fended off approx 48,000 Turkish warriors during the Siege of Malta. After the heroic stand, the capital of Malta is named after the commanding general, Jean de Valette.

=== "Spartan Vengeance" ===
This episode takes the viewer back to ancient Greece and follows the battles tactics of the Spartan Hoplites. Terry Schappert reenacts the brutal training, studies the mental discipline, and evaluates the superior weaponry that gave the Spartans an edge over the much larger Persian army at the Battle of Plataea.

=== "Zulu Siege" ===
Terry Schappert travels to Africa to learn about the rise of the Zulu Nation. He studies their unique battle tactics and culture. He also reenacts one of Britain's most humiliating losses at the Battle of Isandlwana.

=== "Islands of Blood" ===
This episode explores the bloody history of the beautiful Hawaiian Islands. Terry Schappert learns about the bloody hand-to-hand combat techniques and vicious weaponry (like shark tooth clubs) of the Hawaiian warriors. He also reenacts the tactics that King Kamehameha the Great used in his crushing victory at Battle of Nu'uanu Cliffs.

=== "Special Forces" ===
Green Beret Terry Schappert discusses the history and culture of the US Special Forces. He also studies one of the first modern special forces units: The Alamo Scouts. He tries out their weapons, like the Thompson submachine gun and M1 Garand, and reenacts their guerrilla tactics.
