= Sierra de las Navajas =

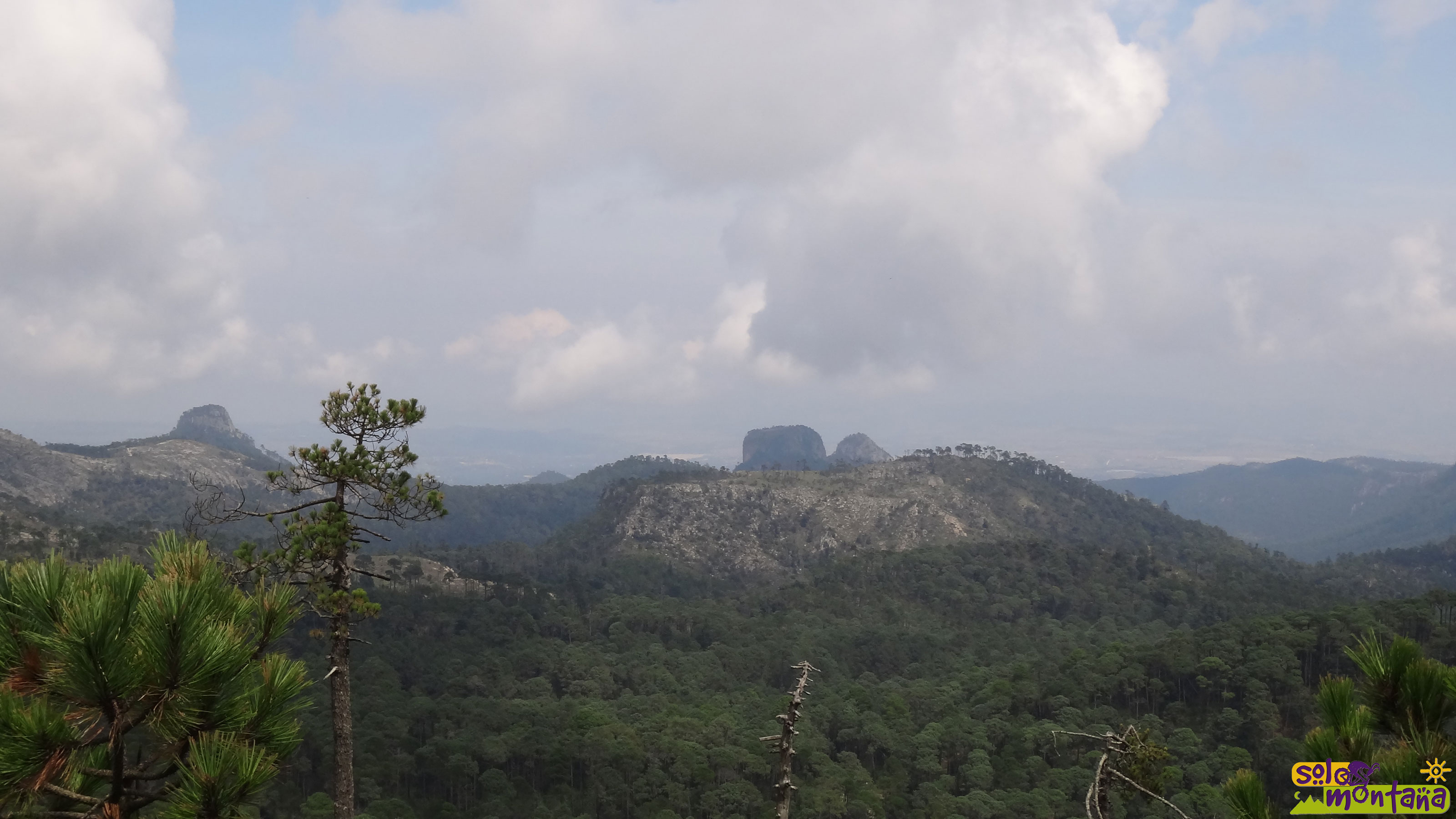
- View of the range in Epazoyucan

Highest point
- Peak: Cerro de las Navajas

Geography
- Country: Mexico
- State: Hidalgo
- Parent range: Sierra Madre Oriental

Sierra de las Navajas is a mountain range in the state of Hidalgo, in central Mexico. It lies on the northeastern margin of the Trans-Mexican Volcanic Belt and includes the mountain Cerro de las Navajas, an important source of obsidian. The range separates the Basin of Mexico from the Tulancingo Valley.

The Sierra de las Navajas is one of the most important archaeological obsidian sources in Mesoamerica. Its distinctive green obsidian was exploited for more than 3,000 years and was distributed widely among Mesoamerican societies. Archaeological research has identified the source as particularly important to the major centers of Teotihuacan, Tula, and Tenochtitlan.

== Geography ==
The Sierra de las Navajas is located in southern Hidalgo, near the city of Pachuca. The mountain range forms part of a volcanic landscape associated with the Trans-Mexican Volcanic Belt. Geologically, it is a Late Pliocene volcanic complex composed predominantly of rhyolite with a peralkaline composition.

The range includes several localities associated with obsidian extraction, most notably Cerro de las Navajas. The obsidian deposit occurs within volcanic deposits produced by explosive activity and includes large obsidian blocks embedded in a relatively weakly consolidated matrix.

The Sierra de las Navajas forms part of the Comarca Minera UNESCO Global Geopark, whose territory stretches along the Pachuca and Las Navajas mountain ranges and which was designated in 2017.

== Obsidian ==
The Sierra de las Navajas is known for a distinctive green obsidian, sometimes described as green-gold or translucent green. Its distinctive colour and chemical composition allow archaeological specimens from the region to be identified through provenance analysis.

Obsidian was extensively exploited at the Sierra de las Navajas for the production of stone tools and other objects. Archaeological investigations have documented extensive quarrying, workshops and accumulations of manufacturing waste. Both open-pit and underground extraction have been identified at Cerro de las Navajas.

== Archaeological importance ==
Obsidian from the Sierra de las Navajas was an important commodity in Mesoamerican exchange networks for more than 3,000 years. Systematic archaeological research has examined the extraction, production and circulation of obsidian from the Sierra alongside other major sources in central Mexico.

The source supplied obsidian to major centers including Teotihuacan, Tula and Tenochtitlan and was connected to long-distance exchange networks extending across Mesoamerica. Archaeological analyses have also identified Sierra de las Navajas obsidian at sites outside the immediate region, providing evidence for the wide distribution of material from the source.

Archaeological research at the mines has documented a long history of exploitation. Recent geological and archaeological research indicates that underground mining at the deposit continued from the Early Formative period into the Colonial period, with increasingly complex exploitation associated with the major states of central Mexico.

== History of research ==
Archaeological investigations of the obsidian mines of the Sierra de las Navajas began in the 19th century. Early investigations documented the extensive deposits of obsidian-working debris and stone tools associated with the mines. Later archaeological research focused on the organization of production and the distribution of Sierra de las Navajas obsidian throughout Mesoamerica.

== See also ==
- Obsidian
- Mesoamerica
- Teotihuacan
- Tula (Mesoamerican site)
- Tenochtitlan
- Geography of Hidalgo
