= Achille Jubinal =

French medievalist

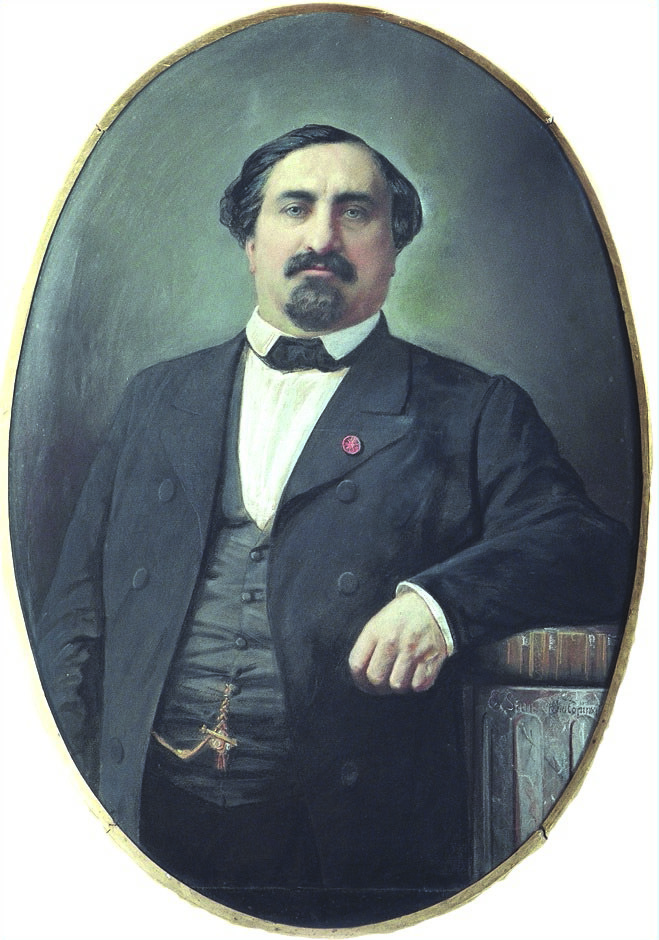
Jubinal Achille (Sans)

Achille Jubinal (24 October 1810 – 23 December 1875) was a French medievalist.
