= Macana =

Type of weapon of Indigenous origin

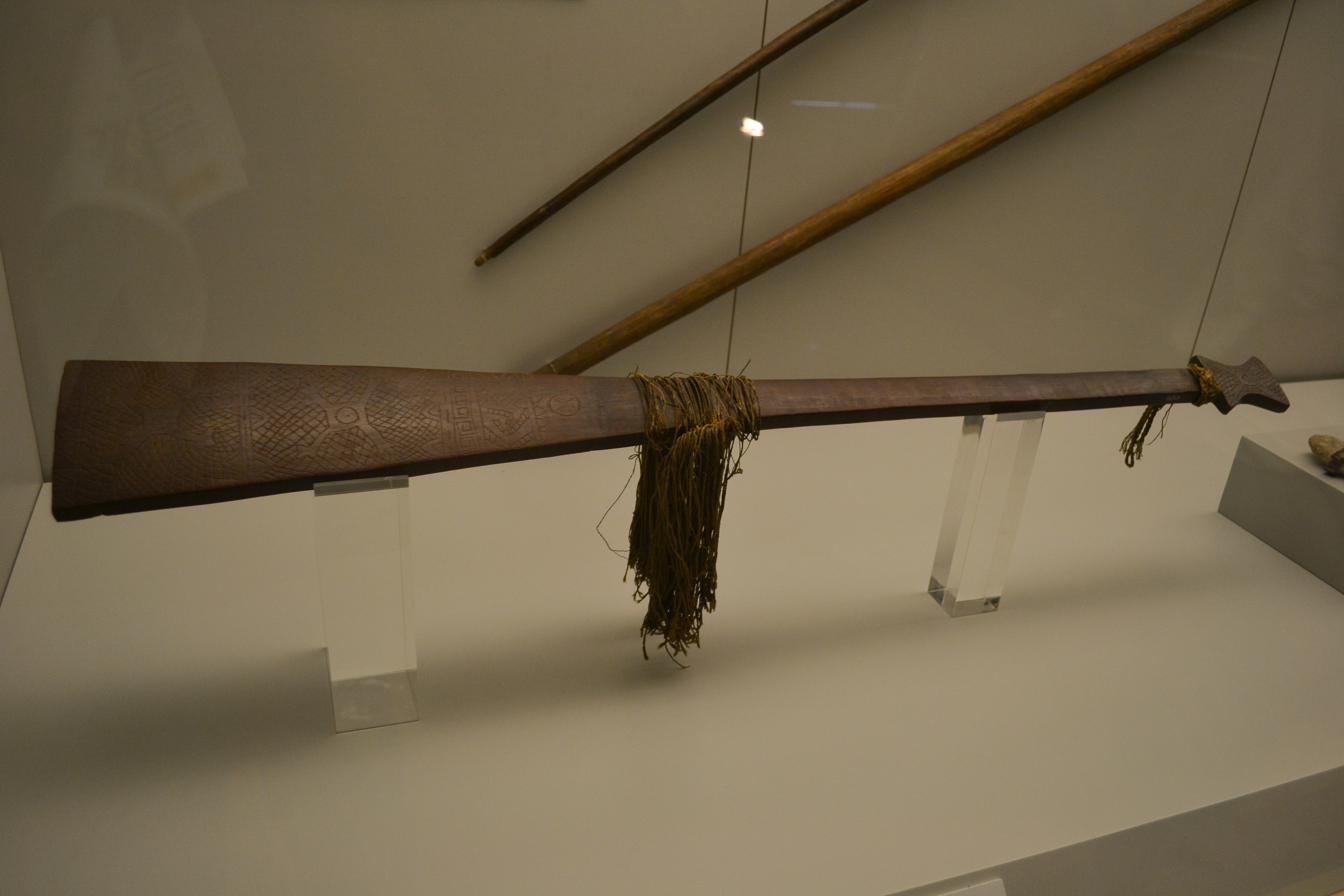
Macana club used by Indigenous Amazonians

The term macana, of Taíno origin, refers to various wooden weapons used by the various Indigenous cultures of Central and South America. These weapons were referred to as a hadzab or hats'ab in Yucatecan Mayan.

== Meaning and origin ==
The earliest meaning attributed to macana is a sword-like weapon made out of wood, but still sharp enough to be dangerous. The term is also sometimes applied to the similar Aztec weapon, which is studded with pieces of obsidian in order to create a blade, though some authorities distinguish this item by using the Nahuatl name macuahuitl.

In the Andes, the Spanish conquistadors applied the term "macana" to the several blunt, mace-like weapons at the disposal of the Inca army's arsenal, particularly to the Chaska chuqui (lit. star spear) and the Chambi (mace) weapons which consisted of a wooden shaft with a heavy metal (copper or bronze) or stone object at the end. As its name suggests, the Chaska chuqui tip was in a star shape to maximize the potential to break bone. They were the most common weapon in the Inca arsenal, and it is possible that gold or silver was used for the star for high-ranking officers.

In modern Spanish the word has broadened to refer to various types of blunt wooden weapons, especially a police nightstick, with a shape very similar to Okinawan tonfas.

== Uses ==
The sizes of macanas are thought to have varied significantly, depending on the application. Most were about one meter long, though other macana varieties were larger. Diversity in macana size likely arose due to various factors, including battle strategy, combatant status or position in the military hierarchy, ethnopolitical group, or environmental factors such as availability of chulul wood. The most dominant iterations of macanas appear to be broad, flat wooden shafts with grooved edges flanked with obsidian blades held in place by resin or another mastic. Macana makers may have made their segments shorter to produce more of them per blade from this non-local resource, especially if obsidian grew increasingly scarce. The obsidian was imported into the lowlands from highland sources in Guatemala and Mexico, probably as preformed polyhedral cores.

One-handed use of macanas enables the user to hold a shield in the free hand while larger macana species typically necessitates two hands. Spanish reports during early battles with the Maya described their opponents' armaments included "[s]words that appeared to be two-handed ones" and "two-handed swords of very strong wood [studded with] obsidian."

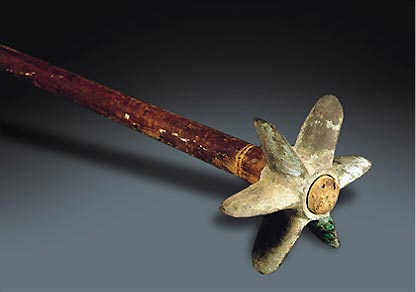
Inca macana

== Archeological remains ==
Many of the obsidian shards used for macanas were prismatic blade segments, which are among the most abundant lithics at late sites in the Maya lowlands. Archeology in sites with macana remains has revealed that some sites, particularly those with large numbers of segments, had bimodal – smaller (ca. 8–10mm) and larger (ca. 20–24 +) – length distributions. This supports the possibility of two sizes of macanas.
