= Lithic analysis =

Scientific analysis of chipped stone artifacts

In archaeology, lithic analysis is the analysis of stone tools and other chipped stone artifacts using basic scientific techniques. At its most basic level, lithic analyses involve an analysis of the artifact's morphology, the measurement of various physical attributes, and examining other visible features (such as noting the presence or absence of cortex, for example).

The term 'lithic analysis' can technically refer to the study of any anthropogenic (human-created) stone, but in its usual sense it is applied to archaeological material that was produced through lithic reduction (knapping) or ground stone. A thorough understanding of the lithic reduction and ground stone processes, in combination with the use of statistics, can allow the analyst to draw conclusions concerning the type of lithic manufacturing techniques used at a prehistoric archaeological site. For example, they can make certain equation between each the factors of flake to predict original shape. These data can then be used to draw an understanding of socioeconomic and cultural organization.

The term knapped is synonymous with "chipped" or "struck", but is preferred by some analysts because it signifies intentionality and process. Ground stone generally refers to any tool made by a combination of flaking, pecking, pounding, grinding, drilling, and incising, and includes things such as mortars / metates, pestles (or manos), grinding slabs, hammerstones, grooved and perforated stones, axes, etc., which appear in all human cultures in some form. Among the tool types analyzed are projectile points, bifaces, unifaces, ground stone artifacts, and lithic reduction by-products (debitage) such as flakes and cores.

== Materials ==
Stone is the one category of material which is used by (virtually) all human cultures and, for the vast majority of the human past, is the only record of human behaviour. The end of prehistory does not signify the end of stone working; stones were knapped in Medieval Europe, well into the 19th century in many parts of Europe and the Americas. Contemporary stone tool manufacturers often work stone for experimentation with past techniques or for replication.

Flint and chert are the most commonly knapped materials and are compact cryptocrystalline quartz. The difference between the two terms is colloquial, and flint can be seen as a variety of chert. In common usage, flint may refer more often to high quality material from chalky matrix (i.e. "chalk flint" as found in Britain) and chert refers to material from limestone matrices. To avoid this, the term "silicate" may be used to describe the family of cryptocrystalline quartzes that are suitable for knapping. As well as cryptocrystalline quartz, macrocrystalline quartz (both vein quartz and rock crystal) was a commonly used raw material around the globe.

In North America, Central America, and other places around the world, such as Turkey and New Zealand, obsidian, or volcanic glass, was also a highly sought-after material for knapping and was widely traded. This is due to the quality of the stone, the razor sharpness of edges that can be created, and the fact that it fractures in highly predictable ways.

Soapstone, or steatite, has been a popular rock for grinding and carving among many cultures worldwide. It has been used for production of such disparate items as vessels/bowls, pipes, cooking slabs, and sculptures.

== Areas of study ==
Conventional approaches to the analysis of knapped stone can be grouped into three elementary, yet ultimately interconnected, areas of study: typological analysis, functional analysis, and technological analysis. Additional areas of study, such as geochemical analysis, have been developed in recent decades.

=== Typological classification ===
In reference to lithic analyses, typological classification is the act of artifact classification based on morphological similarities. Resultant classes include those artifacts subsumed by tool, production, and debitage categories.

The best known lithic typology is the series established by François Bordes (1950) for the Lower and Middle Palaeolithic of France, where sixty three types of stone tools were defined on the basis of manufacturing techniques and morphological characteristics. According to Bordes, the presence or absence of tool types, or differences in the frequency of types between assemblages, were manifestations of cultural differences between ethnic groups. Notwithstanding that there have been several re-evaluations of Bordes’ interpretation of the "ethnicity" of variations in assemblage type composition, the basic assumption that there is explanatory value in the construction of morphologically defined types of artifacts has remained. For instance, the use of typologies as indicators of chronological and/or cultural affiliations is rarely disputed and is acknowledged as an invaluable analytical tool for this purpose.

=== Function ===
Functional analysis of stone tools – a term given to a variety of approaches designed with the aim of identifying the use of a stone tool – is based on the argument that the uses to which tools were put in antiquity leave diagnostic damage and/or polish on their working edges. This type of analysis is also known as use-wear analysis

Experiments have been conducted in order to match up the microwear patterns on actual artifacts with experimental artifacts. At the site of Nausharo, the use-wear analysis conducted on the flint artifacts showed a match to the experimental use-wear of a potter using the flint blades as trimming tools for pottery placed on a potter's wheel. This is significant because it gives direct evidence for the use of the blades and for the presence of a potter's wheel.

Although there are debates concerning the physics of both edge polishes and edge damage which draw on the science of tribology, modern microwear analysis usually depends on the comparisons of the edge wear of modern experimentally produced samples with archaeological and/or ethnographic tools. The ability of a microwear analyst has been tested in the past by presenting them with a set of experimentally produced and utilised tool in a blind experiment. The overall purpose is to provide an accurate, and precise, analytical instrument for the identification of stone tool function. The precision of functional identifications may range considerably, from "scraping soft material" to "scraping fresh hide for 10 minutes" with a corresponding drop in accuracy as precision increases. Macrowear studies relying on 3D modelling are also increasingly common.

Ethnographic research is another way to figure out the use of stone tools by observing the modern communities which still have stone tool traditions. A research of the Wola society in Papua New Guinea shows that stone tools have a wide range of uses, but a short lifespan. They use stone tools to make weapons, utensils, clothing, and musical instruments. However, the lithic materials might be less important than wooden tools in their material culture when considering other resources in the Wola. It shows that studying both people and environment as a whole can provide a better understanding of the function and role of stone tools.

=== Technology ===
Technological analysis is concerned with the examination of the production of knapped-stone artifacts. The study of the attributes of waste products (debitage) and tools are the most important methods for the study of knapped-stone technology, backed up with experimental production. One such method of experimentation is to use steel balls dropped by an electromagnet onto a glass prism to test relationships such as platform thickness and flake length. Additionally, work by Patterson(1990) indicates that the process of bifacial reduction can be identified through analysis of debitage in the absence of an identifiable bifacial artefact by comparing the various proportions of an assemblage's flake sizes. A very wide range of attributes may be used to characterize and compare assemblages to isolate (and interpret) differences across time and space in the production of stone tools. Lithic analysts identify flake scarring on stone artifacts in order to understand the manufacturing process of flake production. There have been efforts to identify variables to predict original size of discarded tool artifact but the results yielded from these studies have not been uniform and research continues. Kuhn (1990) presents his Geometric Index of Unifacial Reduction, an equation for estimating the mass loss of retouched stone artefacts. This index attempts to use 2D measurements of a flakes reduced edge to find the lost mass. Discovering the amount a particular flake has been reduced can help archaeologists answer questions of tool maintainability, optimal resources, and knapping practices. Kuhn's GIUR method was recently reestablished as a robust method as evident through simulation and experiments yielding strong positive correlation coefficients of flake mass removed from retouched flakes. The GIUR method is best used on flakes that have been lightly retouched and it can only be used on flakes that are unifacial. 3D modelling is an increasingly important tool for lithic analysis.

Above all, whether the typological classification, function or technology, there is a premise in these analytic method. The premise is that archaeologists presume a blueprint of the end-product of stone tool, or say a mental map with step-by-step processes of prehistoric people in mind. This assumption contain the concept that people tend to shape stone tool into certain specific form for specific purpose. This is the foundation of lithic typology and widely accepted. However Hiscock (2004) provides an ethnographic observation from Australia and points out that the processes of making lithic flake are actually more social dynamic and with much negotiation between lithic knappers, the common measure attributes, such as retouched scar, form of flake and optimal economic presumption, are all less related to the function of the end-product. Although there are several other ethnographic studies lead to similar conclusion, Hiscock reminds that these observations are not to overthrow the classification system now but to provide an alternative possibility to consider lithic study. Shott proposed that the settlement mobility and lithic technology are related based on ethnographic and archaeological studies. The technological diversity decreases when the mobility frequency and magnitude become greater, which is consistent with theoretically derived expectations from 14 ethnographic groups. Though diversity decreases, however, the range in the tool's flexibility in function greatly increases. As a result, the tool limit a group can carry can be determined by their mobility. Foragers need only two to three different tool classes in order to survive.

=== Petrological and geochemical analysis ===
Petrological and geochemical analysis can be useful in identifying the sources of lithics and assist in establishing trade and migration routes. Methods used are typical of those used in geologic research, such as petrographic thin section analysis, neutron activation analysis, stable isotope analysis, and X-ray fluorescence. One example of this application is Yellin (1996) in which neutron activation analysis was used to trace the source of obsidian artifacts found at the Gilat site in Israel. This investigation found that earlier obsidian was obtained from central Anatolia, but in later times, obsidian was obtained from another region in eastern Anatolia. This is used as evidence for changing trade relationships in Israel during the Chalcolithic period.

=== Reduction ===
Lithic reduction itself can be studied to help illuminate the settlement and movement patterns of hunter-gatherer groups by following the idea of Central Place Foraging Models. The Model dictates that the farther from a resource a group inhabits, the more processing of that resource will occur in the field before being transported to the primary habitation. Testing of this model has indicated it is indeed applicable to lithic assemblages, and can help to identify assemblages created by highly mobile hunter-gatherer societies in prehistory.
