= Cortex (archaeology) =

Outer layer of rock often removed when creating stone tools

In lithic analysis in archaeology, the cortex is the outer layer of rock formed on the exterior of raw materials by chemical and mechanical weathering processes. It is often recorded on the dorsal surface of flakes using a three-class system: primary, secondary, and tertiary. The amount of cortex present on artifacts in an archaeological assemblage may indicate the extent of lithic reduction that has occurred. Primary, secondary, and tertiary designations for flakes are generally determined by relative amounts of cortex presented on the dorsal surface. Some archaeologists classify flakes with no cortex as tertiary, flakes with some cortex as secondary, and flakes with all cortex as primary, whereas others make distinctions at every third or half of the dorsal surface covered. Differences in how archaeologists classify the amount of cortex and the results of experimental archaeological tests demonstrating the moderate correlation between the amount of cortex and stage of reduction, have limited the validity of assumptions based on the amount of cortex solely.
