= Flake tool =

Type of stone tool

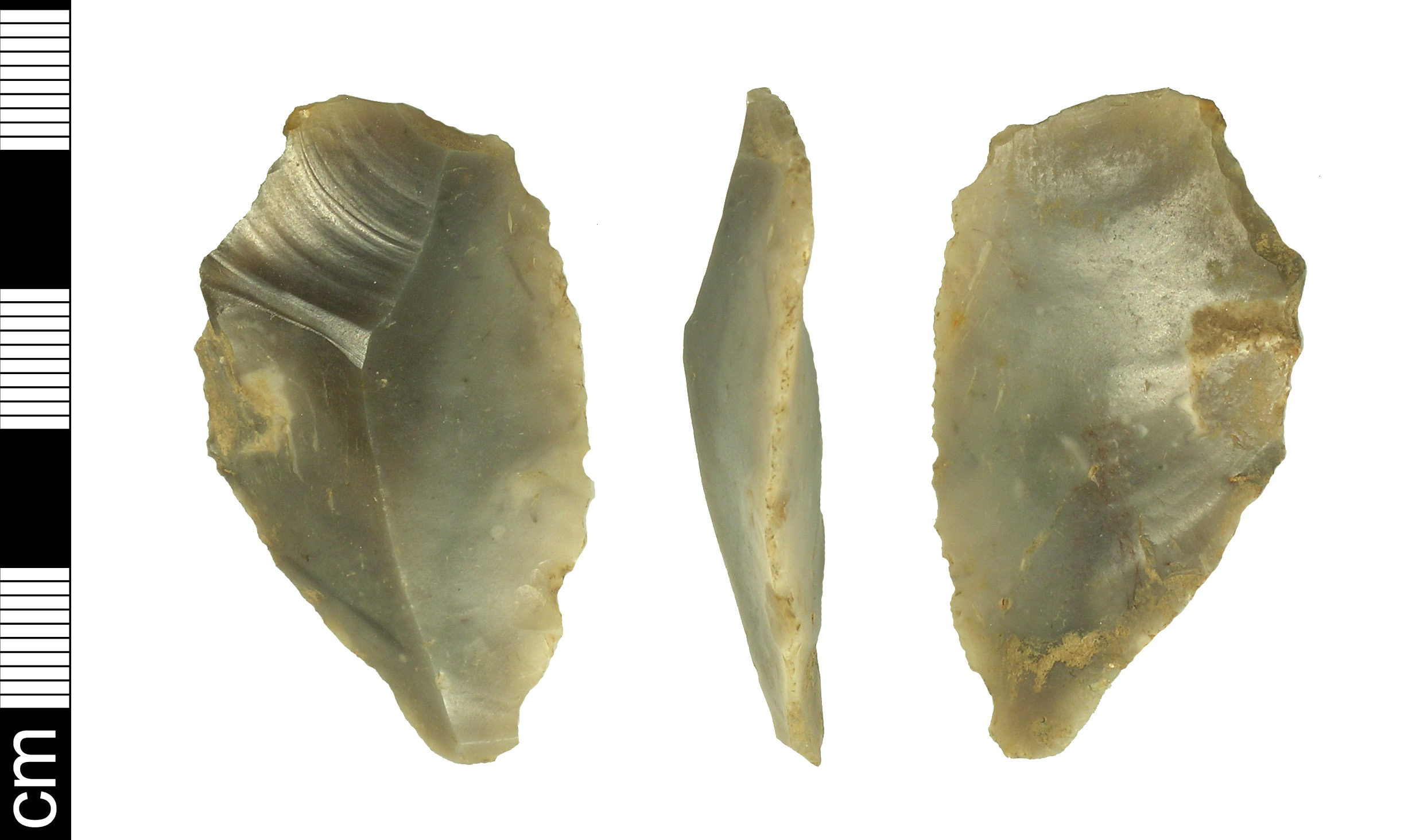
A flint flake tool from the Neolithic, found in Hertfordshire, England

In archaeology, a flake tool is a type of stone tool that was used during the Stone Age that was created by striking a flake from a prepared stone core. People during prehistoric times often preferred these flake tools as compared to other tools because these tools were often easily made, could be made to be extremely sharp & could easily be repaired. Flake tools could be sharpened by retouch to create scrapers or burins. These tools were either made by flaking off small particles of flint or by breaking off a large piece and using that as a tool itself. These tools were able to be made by this "chipping" away effect due to the natural characteristic of stone. Stone is able to break apart when struck near the edge. Flake tools are created through flint knapping, a process of producing stone tools using lithic reduction.

== Lithic reduction ==
Lithic reduction is the removal of a lithic flake from a larger stone in order to reach the desired tool shape and size. The beginning stone is called the flake lithic core. There are three steps to lithic reduction:

1. Hard hammer percussion is the first step. It involves knocking off the larger flakes to achieve the desired lithic core for the flake tool. In using hard hammer percussion the flake tools were made by taking metamorphic or igneous rock such as granite or quartz and striking it against the stone. This method was often used to flake large core flakes of hard rock.
2. Soft hammer percussion is the second step. It involves using a hammer made of bone, which was often antler, in order to knock off flakes from the lithic core. Animal antlers such as moose, deer and elk were often the most common ones used. It allows the user more control over the size and shape of the flake knocked off. Soft hammer percussion was also used when the stone was more brittle.
3. Pressure flaking is the final step. It involves using a piece of bone, antler, or piece of hardwood in order to have more control of the flakes knocked off of the lithic core. One simply applies outward and downward pressure to achieve the final flake tool.

== Types of stone used to create flake tools ==
Certain types of stone work better for creating flake tools than others. There are two important characteristics when it comes to creating flake tools, cryptocrystalline and conchoidal fracture. Cryptocrystalline relates to a stone structure that is made up of such minute crystals that its crystalline structure is only vaguely revealed. These cryptocrystalline rocks are composed of microscopic crystal like patterns. Since these rocks are not composed of large quartz crystals, they often break as easily as glass and then make conchoidal fractures. Conchoidal fracture describes the way in which materials break when they do not follow the natural planes of separation. These fractures are described as curved. When the stone is struck, the blow from the strike is distributed onto the rock in an even fashion, giving the fracture a radial appearance. The production of these lithic tools is only made possible due to their ability to fracture in this way. Examples of such materials include fine-grained materials, such as carbonado, volcanic rocks, obsidian, onyx, and types of glass. These would all be excellent materials for creating flake tools.

== How archaeologists study flake tools ==
Flake tools can teach us much about human history. Residue analysis can be done to learn what was processed by the flake tools. Use-wear analysis can give archaeologists an idea of what the flake tool was used for. Archaeologists also use a process called re-fitting. This is the technological process of putting rock shards back together in their original shape in order to get a good idea of how the tool was created. All of these processes can help us to understand our human ancestors and how, why and when they created flake tools. These flake tools also have characteristics that show that these tools were made as a result of human work instead of natural processes. Each flake has 5 different parts: the first of which is a bulb of percussion which can also be known as the bulb of force. The next being an eraillure which is a flake that has been taken off of the lithic bulb of percussion. The third part of the flake is the radial fissures. The next part of the flake is the ripple marks followed by the negative flake scars which are located on the dorsal side from earlier flake markings.
