= Pierre-Eudoxe Dubalen =

French archaeologist

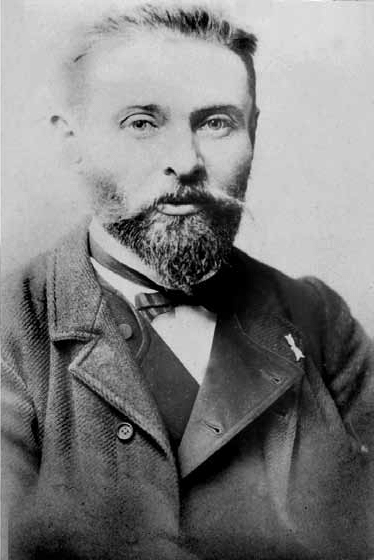
- Born: 26 March 1851; Montgaillard, Landes, France
- Died: 27 April 1936 (aged 85); Montsoué
- Occupations: Archeology, agriculturist, geologist, and pharmacist

Pierre-Eudoxe Dubalen, born on March 26, 1851, in Montgaillard and died on April 27, 1936, in Montsoué, was a French archaeologist, prehistorian, and protohistorian. He was also an agronomist, naturalist, ichthyologist, ornithologist, geologist, botanist, paleontologist, and museum curator.

Born in a small village in the Tursan wine region in the Landes department, he successfully transitioned to agronomy after a brief career as a pharmacist. Alongside his professional activities, he conducted archaeological excavations in Tursan and Chalosse. Initially an amateur, he made errors in analysis and dating but eventually developed a scientific approach. His first major discovery came in 1881 at Brassempouy, where he unearthed the Pape Cave in a quarry. The following year, during an excursion to the site, he discovered the Venus of Brassempouy. In 1911, he conducted excavations in the Rivière Cave, uncovering a human face carved on a bone plaque. Although he initially declared it authentic, it was later revealed to be a forgery. From 1912 onward, he focused on studying what he termed "tumuliform mounds" in the southern Landes region.

He is regarded as one of the key contributors to the development of archaeology in southwestern France, particularly in the Landes department. His collections, largely derived from his archaeological excavations, are the foundation of the Dubalen Museum in Mont-de-Marsan.

== Biography ==
=== Family ===
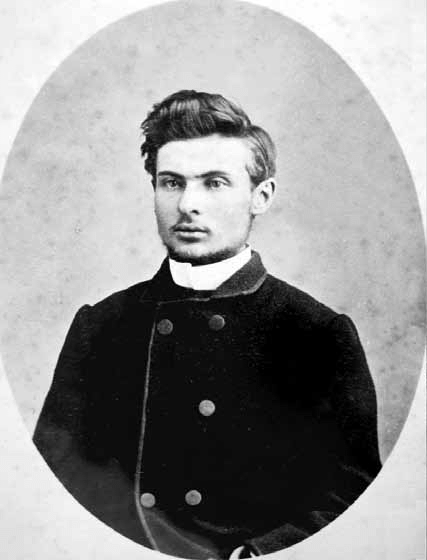
The young Pierre-Eudoxe Dubalen.

Two great-uncles of Pierre-Eudoxe Dubalen served in the French armed forces and were knighted in the Legion of Honor for their actions in the Napoleonic Wars: Antoine (June 16, 1804) and Raymond (1806, knight of Saint Louis and deputy of the Landes).

Pierre-Eudoxe Dubalen had two sons: Louis, a military officer, knight of the Legion of Honor, who died in the Battle of Chemin des Dames, and Paul, born on May 26, 1882, in Saint-Sever, a medical officer – he studied at the Army Health School and obtained a medical degree from the Faculty of Medicine and Pharmacy of Lyon in January 1907 —, knight of the Legion of Honor in 1921. The latter had two sons: Guy, a lieutenant in the Air Force, and Pierre, a colonel and knight of the Legion of Honor in 1963.

=== Life ===
Pierre-Justin-Eudoxe Dubalen was born on March 26, 1851, in Montgaillard. He was the son of Jean-Marie-Louis-Eudoxe Dubalen, a 33-year-old landowner, and Marie-Constance Diris, his 29-year-old wife. After studying pharmacy and practicing for a few years, he devoted himself to agronomy: he acclimatized American vines to the Southwest of France, promoted chemical fertilizers, and took the lead of the Landes Departmental Nursery and Agricultural Laboratory. He was the first to suggest the existence of oil fields in the Landes and Béarn regions. He died in Montsoué on April 27, 1936.

== Archaeology ==
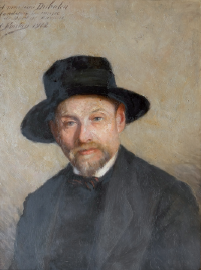
Portrait of Pierre-Eudoxe Dubalen in 1912 by Joseph-Augustin Fontan.

From 1870, alongside his career as a pharmacist and then agronomist, Pierre-Eudoxe Dubalen conducted surveys in the hills of Tursan and Chalosse. For nearly 50 years, he led archaeological excursions, particularly around Montsoué, where he discovered deposits from the Middle and Upper Paleolithic periods; he unearthed a series of flint tools at La Fauquille and on the Pouy hill, as well as animal remains. He classified his findings and compared them with those found in Tercis-les-Bains, Gamarde-les-Bains, and Laurède. A self-taught archaeologist, he made analytical errors but studied investigative, nomenclature, and periodization methods until he could conduct genuine scientific research. Aware that he was destroying the sites he excavated, he recorded their initial state in very detailed excavation notebooks. He excavated the Arcet deposit in Montaut and, in 1900, the Dufaure shelter in Sorde-l'Abbaye.

He offered in 1893 the work "Ancienneté de l'homme dans le département des Landes" (Antiquity of man in the Landes department) and in 1901, flint tools to the Anthropological Society of Paris. He joined the French Prehistoric Society in 1904 and became its correspondent in the Landes.

=== Pape Cave and Venus of Brassempouy Controversy ===
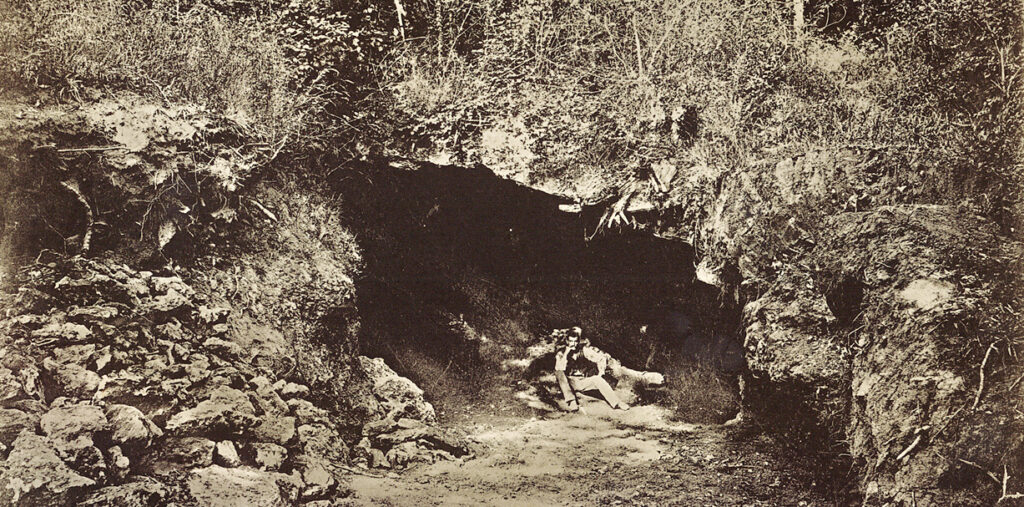
The entrance of the Cave of the Pope around 1897, at the end of the excavations by Édouard Piette and Joseph de Laporterie.

In 1880, during work in a quarry at Brassempouy, a cavity now known as the Pape Cave was discovered, containing bones and flint tools. Dubalen conducted initial excavations at the site and published a report in 1881. The research stopped that year due to a disagreement with the quarry owner, Paul de Poudenx, over the ownership of the discoveries. On September 19, 1892, the French Association for the Advancement of Sciences organized an excursion to the Pape Cave, where two Venus figurines were discovered: La Poire — found by Dubalen and Eugène Trutat — and the Ébauche, as well as the ring and stopper of a wineskin.

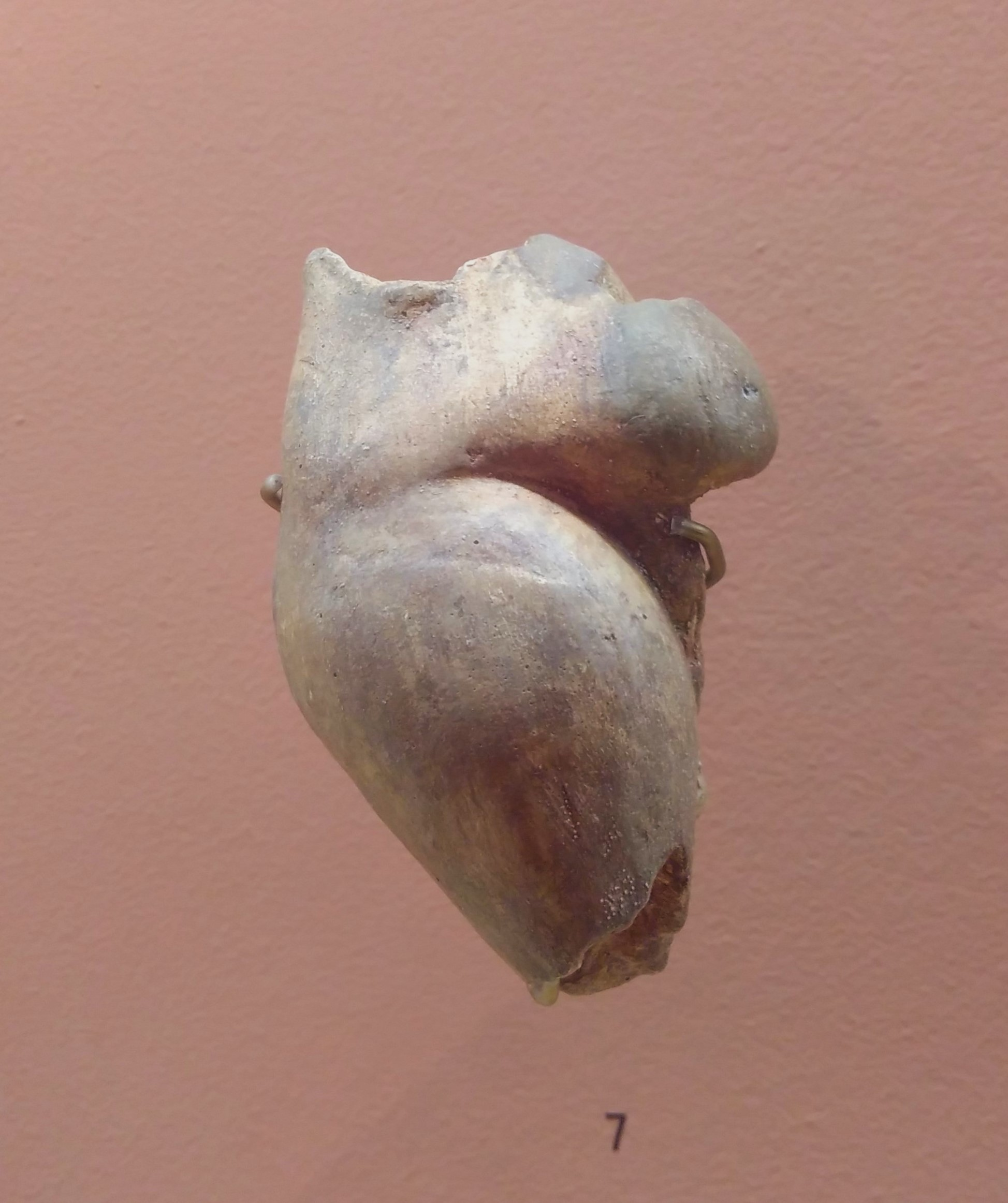
The Venus of Brassempouy, National Museum of Antiquities in Saint-Germain-en-Laye.

A controversy erupted between Dubalen and Édouard Piette: the latter believed that the discoveries should belong to Count de Poudenx, while Dubalen, Trutat, and Émile Cartailhac believed they should be kept in a museum. Piette accused Cartailhac of saying "that one had the right to steal for museums, because it was in the public interest." From 1894, Piette obtained exclusive permission from the count to continue excavations on the site and to retrieve the Venus for his personal collections, which he bequeathed to the National Antiquities Museum. Eventually, Dubalen gave up, stating, "the name of the worker doesn't matter as long as the work is published and can benefit everyone".

=== Rivière Cave and Second Controversy ===
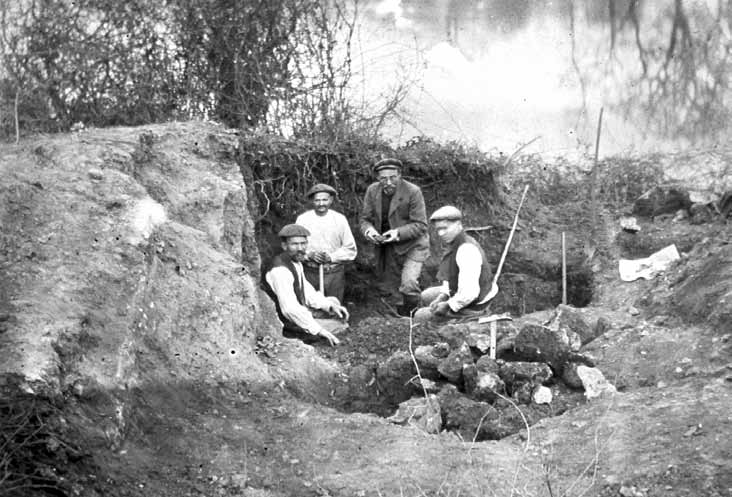
Dubalen during the excavations at Rivière, on the banks of the Adour, in 1911.

In March 1911, he conducted excavations on the banks of the Adour River in the Rivière Cave, discovered fifty years earlier. He obtained a grant from the Committee on Historical and Scientific Works and one from the Mont-de-Marsan municipality. He published his findings in a report released in October in the bulletin of the French Prehistoric Society. He reported on a lithic and bone industry from the Upper Paleolithic and what he called a "chimera": a schematic face engraved on a bone that he claimed was authentic, despite the presence of several forgeries at the site. For several years, a controversy ensued between Dubalen, convinced that the chimera was authentic, and Henri Breuil. This controversy further discredited him in the archaeological community. Regarding the other forgeries found at the site, he claimed to have obtained confessions from a "cultivated person who was by no means ignorant of questions relating to Natural History".

=== "Tumuliform Mounds" ===
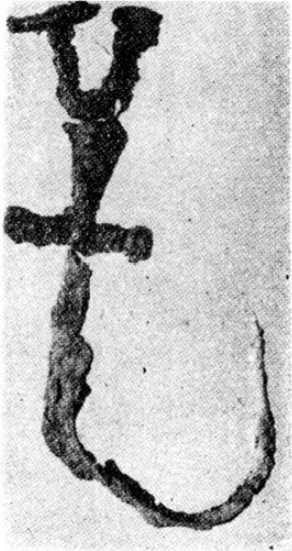
The false sword from Tursan.

From 1912, Dubalen focused on megaliths and what he called "tumuliform mounds". He excavated three in Vielle-Saint-Girons and Aubagnan, Lacajunte, and Arboucave, then in Samadet after 1925. At Mesplède, he made one of his most important discoveries: rich burials, a mail coat, a soliferrum javelin, silver phials with Iberian engravings, brooches, torques, and funerary urns. In 1926, he excavated one last tumulus in Aubagnan.

He then abandoned field research to focus on theoretical reflection. He established a classification — now abandoned — of mounds and tumuli: habitation, fully paved, funerary, unpaved, and mixed, with the western half paved.

In the collective work "Nos Landes," published in 1927, Dubalen published a drawing of a sword with antennas that would have been found in a Tursan tumulus and then exhibited at the Dubalen Museum. It was actually a montage made from a brooch for the antennas, a second one for the guard, and a javelin tip for the blade.

=== "The Chalossien" ===
In 1923, Dubalen conceived a new Paleolithic facies, which preceded the Chellean: the "Chalossien," named after his region, Chalosse, which, according to him, was the site of an original lithic industry and among the oldest. Its main tool would have been the three-sided flint, or trihedral. A debate opened at the French Prehistoric Society, and one of its members, André Vayson de Pradenne, visited the Landes in 1927, inspected the collections of the Dubalen Museum and several excavation sites, and noted that, despite morphological resemblance, the flints did not have the same technological aspect. Moreover, most came from surface collections rather than stratigraphic research. Despite these contradictions, Dubalen continued to publish works on the subject and did not disavow the Chalossien until his death.

== Other Sciences ==
In addition to archaeology, Dubalen was interested in other natural sciences: geology, botany, entomology, zoology, and paleontology. He maintained an herbarium of 10,000 plates consisting of seed plants and algae from the Pyrenees, southern France, and Algeria. He described a fish: Aturius Dubalen, 1878 (a synonym of Leuciscus Cuvier, 1816). He was a member of the Linnean Society of Bordeaux from December 20, 1871, as well as the Borda Society.

== The Dubalen Museum ==
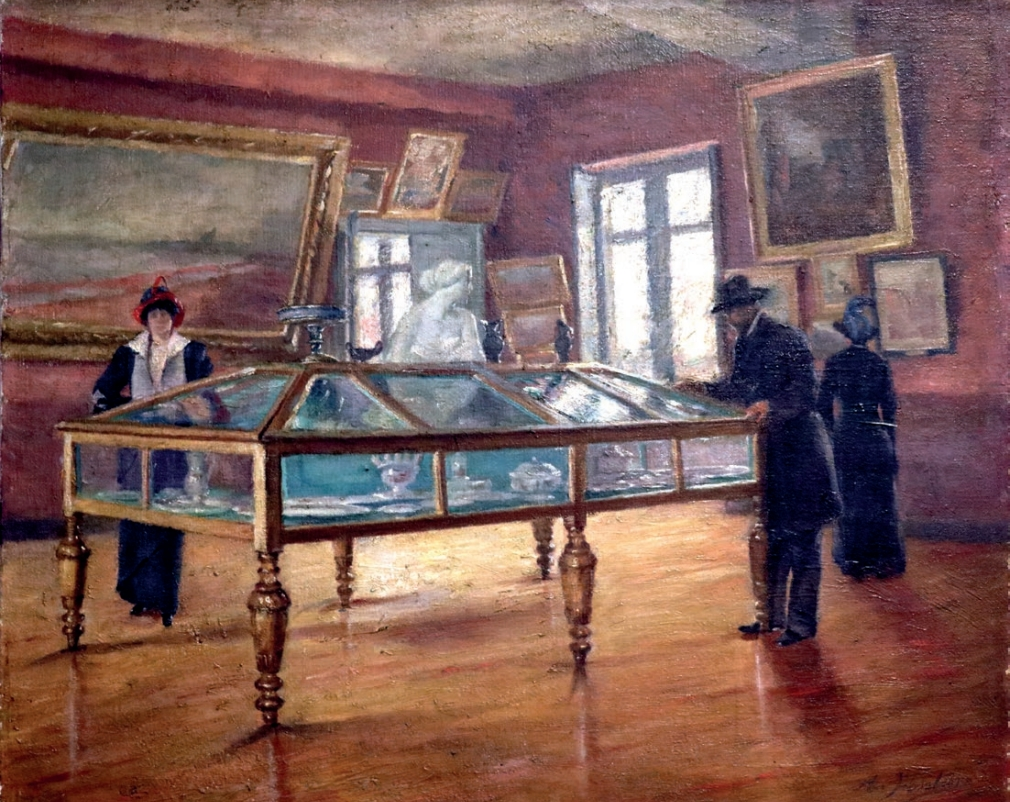
The Fine Arts hall of the Dubalen Museum, in the Pascal-Duprat Palace, by Joseph-Augustin Fontan, circa 1913, Despiau-Wlérick Museum.

Dubalen's collection grew over the years through excavations; by 1885, it comprised over a hundred objects: hand axes, engraved bones, small axes, axes, and arrowheads, but also plants, insects, and fossils. Dubalen installed it in premises provided by the commune of Mont-de-Marsan. The following year, based on these collections, the municipal Natural History Museum was created, which was housed in a room of the municipal theater. Dubalen became its first curator. The museum's collection, enriched by purchases of taxidermied animals and the recovery in 1889 of mineralogical collections from Félix-Victor Paulin and André-Eugène Jacquot, was transferred in the early 20th century to the Pascal-Duprat Palace, the current city hall of Mont-de-Marsan. The Dubalen collection, on the first floor, includes numerous Paleolithic, Neolithic, and Iron Age objects, as well as antiquities, with several millstones, ceramics, and ancient lamps. It is complemented by works of art, geological specimens, an entomology collection, and an "exotic" section, with dozens of arrows, borers, and ostrich eggshell beads from the Sahara.

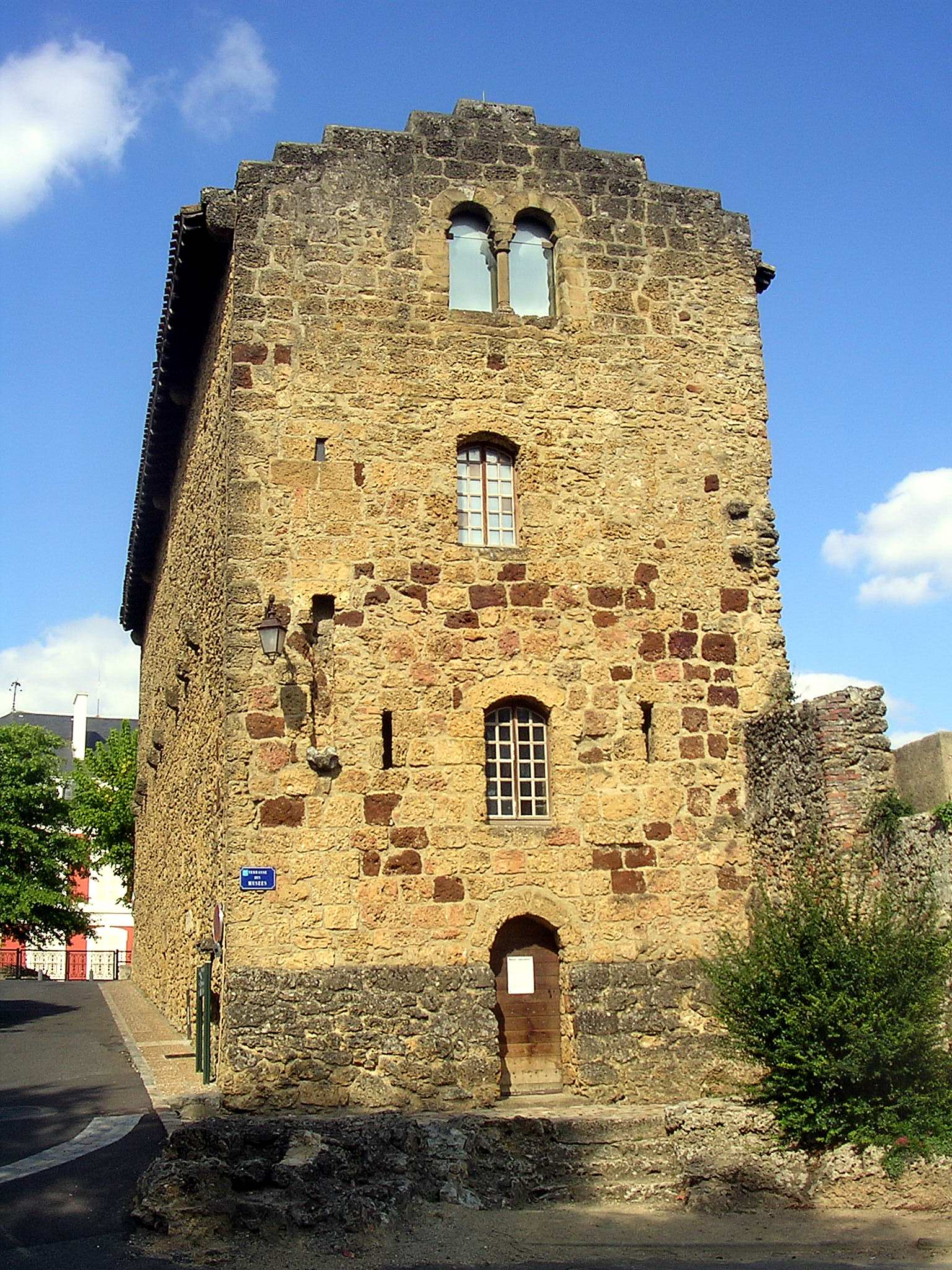
Romanesque house in Mont-de-Marsan housing the Dubalen Museum since 1972.

Upon Dubalen's death in 1936, his friend Pierre Lummau became the museum curator until 1946, followed by Maurice Prat until 1960 and Henri Mougel, also curator of the Despiau-Wlérick Museum, until 1970. Claude Thibault conducted an inventory of the museum's collections at that time. The museum closed for the first time in 1970 and was transferred to a Romanesque house on rue Maubec. Guy Peyo, the new curator, drastically sorted the collection: it had to be placed on a single floor of another Romanesque house located 50 meters from the Lacataye keep, inaugurated in 1972. In 1977, the museum was taken over by its first professional curator: Armand-Henri Amann, who attempted to reorganize it but faced conservation problems with certain pieces. Finally, in the early 1990s, Philippe Camin, heritage curator of the Landes department, closed the museum and transferred the collections — depleted by thefts during the Occupation, losses during successive moves, damage by students visiting the museum, and loans by archaeologists such as Georges Laplace, who "safeguarded" certain pieces at the Arudy museum, and Jean-Pierre Mohen, who took crates of furniture to study at the National Archaeology Museum, never to return them – to a reserve at the Despiau-Wlérick Museum, on the top floor of the Latacaye keep.

== Legacy ==
=== Distinctions ===
Pierre-Eudoxe Dubalen was honored several times for his work, first as an agronomist and then as an archaeologist:

- Knight of the Legion of Honor (1925)
- Knight of the Order of Agricultural Merit
- Knight of the Order of Academic Palms

=== Tributes ===
The sirenian Prohalicore dubaleni, whose remains were discovered by Dubalen in the quarries of Odon in Tartas, was named in his honor by Léon Flot. A street bears his name in Mont-de-Marsan. The Club Dubalen association, which aims to promote historical and archaeological heritage in Aquitaine, pays tribute to him. A gallery of the Brassempouy Cave bears his name.

On September 7, 2013, Dubalen was the focus of a day of lectures at the House of the Lady of Brassempouy organized by Lionel Ducamp, with speakers Aurélien Simonet, Jessica Lacarrière, and Alexandre Lefebvre. During the Museum Night on May 18, 2013, the Despiau-Wlérick Museum organized a presentation of Dubalen's collections.

== Bibliography ==
- Lummau, Pierre (1936). Nécrologie de Pierre Dubalen (in French). Vol. 33. Bulletin de la Société préhistorique française. pp. 289–302.
- Prat, Maurice (1950). Un savant de chez nous : Pierre-Eudoxe Dubalen (1851–1936) (in French). Bulletin de la Société de Borda.
- Barrouquère, Hervé (2012). Dubalen archéologue : du terrain au musée (PDF) (in French). Vol. 3. Bulletin de la Société de Borda.
- Pueyo, Guy (1971). Musée Dubalen (in French).
- Pueyo, Guy (1973). Les collections d'histoire naturelle de Dubalen et leur évolution en muséologie (in French).
- Bilbao, Marie; Barrouquère, Hervé (2011). Six pieds sous terre, il y a 3000 ans : archéologie des Landes de Gascogne (in French).
- Lefebvre, Alexandre (2014). Les industries osseuses des collections anciennes de Brassempouy (in French). Archéologie des Pyrénées Occidentales et des landes.
- Simonet, Aurélien (2018). "Archéologie des Pyrénées occidentales et des Landes. Brassempouy. Les collections Dubalen et de Laporterie". Brassempouy (Landes). Présentation du site et des collections Dubalen et de Laporterie (in French). Bulletin de la Fédération Archéologique des Pyrénées occidentales et des Landes.
- Cabannes, Gabriel (1931). Galerie des Landais : les contemporains (in French). Chabat.
- Cabannes, Gabriel (1945). Galerie des landais (in French). Chabas.
- Suau, Bernadette (1991). Mémoire des Landes : dictionnaire biographique (in French). Comité d'études sur l'histoire et l'art de la Gascogne. ISBN 2950158420.
- Chabas, David; Dubus, Gilles (1993). Bibliographie des Landes (in French). Chabas.
