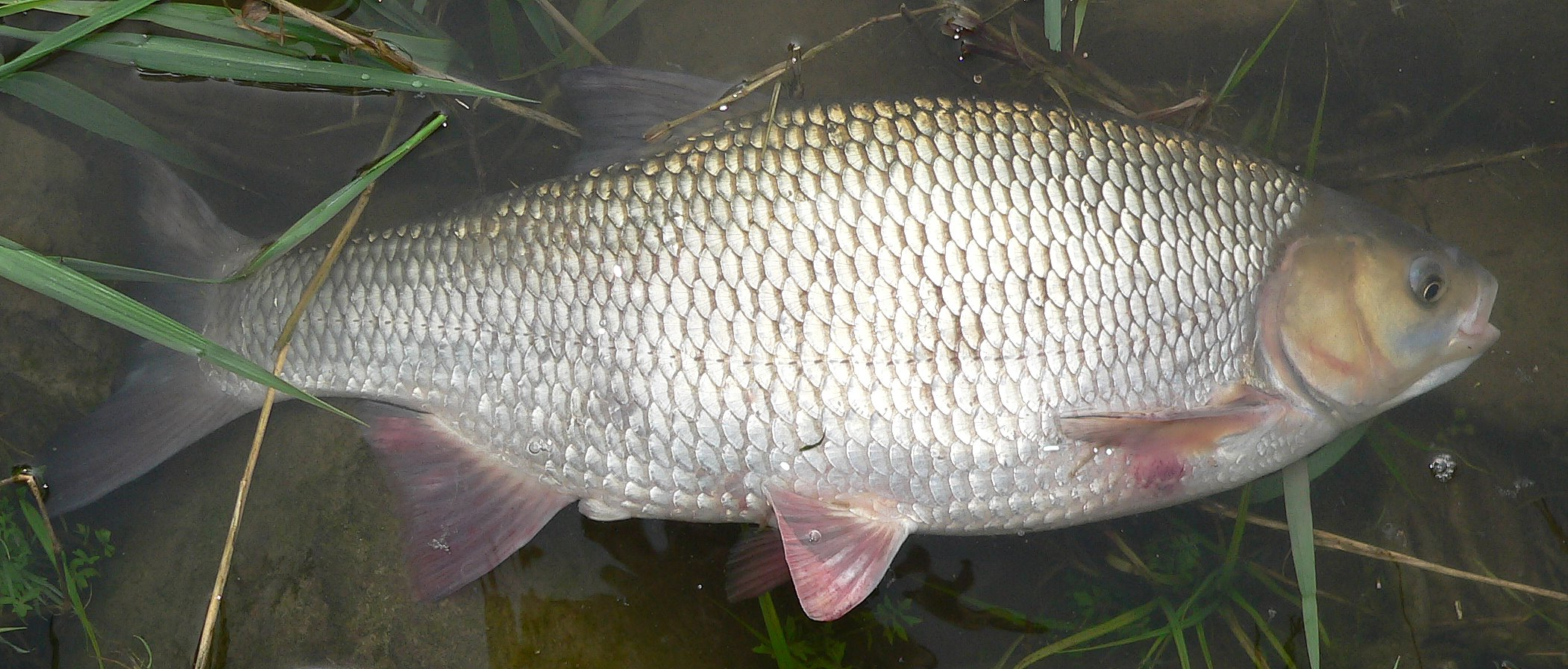

Conservation status
- Least Concern (IUCN 3.1)

Scientific classification
- Kingdom: Animalia
- Phylum: Chordata
- Class: Actinopterygii
- Division: Teleostei
- Order: Cypriniformes
- Family: Leuciscidae
- Subfamily: Leuciscinae
- Genus: Leuciscus
- Species: L. idus

Binomial name
- Leuciscus idus (Linnaeus, 1758)

Synonyms
- Cyprinus idus Linnaeus, 1758; Cyprinus idbarus Linnaeus, 1758; Cyprinus jeses Linnaeus, 1758; Cyprinus orfus Linnaeus, 1758; Cyprinus microlepidotus Ekström, 1835; Leuciscus neglectus Selys-Longchamps, 1842; Idus melanotus Heckel, 1843; Idus miniatus Bonaparte, 1845; Idus miniatus Heckel & Kner, 1857; Leuciscus idus var. lapponicus Günther, 1868; Idus stagnalis Dubalen, 1913

= Ide (fish) =

Species of fish

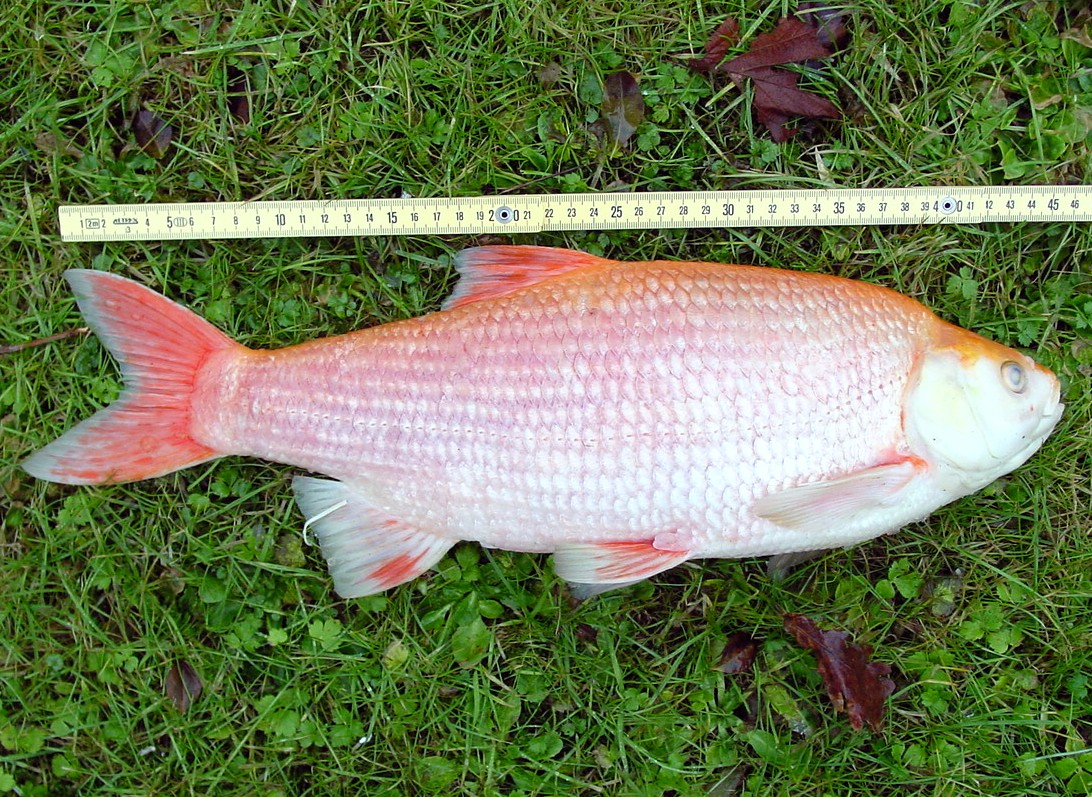
Gold orfe

The ide (Leuciscus idus), or orfe, is a species of freshwater ray-finned fish belonging to the family Leuciscidae. The ide is found in larger rivers, ponds, and lakes across Northern Europe and Asia. It has been introduced outside its native range into Europe, North America, and New Zealand. It is a popular ornamental fish, usually kept in outdoor ponds in temperate regions from which it often escapes.

== Etymology ==
The name "ide" is from Swedish id, originally referring to its bright colour (compare the German dialect word Aitel, a kind of bright fish and Old High German Eit, funeral pyre, fire). The alternative name "orfe" derives from German Orf, through the Latin orphus meaning a "sea fish" or "sea perch", which in turn derives from the Greek orphōs. The generic name Leuciscus is derived from the Greek word leykiskos, which means "white mullet".

== Subspecies ==
The two recognised subspecies of the ide are:

- L. i. idus (Linnaeus) the nominate subspecies
- L. i. oxianus (Kessler, 1877) from central Asia

== Description ==
The ide is a rather plump, sturdily built fish with a deep body, although not especially so. The peduncle of the caudal fin is thick. When they are small, ide have dark backs and silvery sides, but older fish develop a golden sheen along the flanks. At all ages, the eye is yellow and the pectoral fin and anal fin are reddish in colour. The dorsal fin has three spines and 8–11 soft rays, the anal fin has three spines and 8–11 soft rays, while the caudal fin has 19 rays. It has 47 vertebrae. It is distinguished from other European members of the genus Leucsicus by the lateral line having 56–58 scales; 3.5–5.3 pharyngeal teeth, in having a terminal mouth, and branching in 8% of the dorsal rays and 10% of the anal rays. They grow to 25–50 cm in length and the normal weight range is 0.5–1.5 kg and they seldom attain weights over 2.0 kg. The European rod-caught record is 5.5 kg. Reports have been made of ides attaining total lengths around 100 cm and weights of 8 kg.

== Distribution ==
The ide is native to Europe and western Asia from the rivers draining into the North Sea east through southern Scandinavia and eastern Europe to the Caspian Sea drainage and the River Lena. As a popular ornamental fish, it was introduced to Great Britain in 1874 and is now widespread in England and Wales, but only has a localised distribution in Scotland. It was introduced into France and from there and Germany was introduced as an ornamental fish into the Netherlands.

Outside of Europe, the ide was first taken to the United States of America in 1877, when live specimens were imported by the United States Fish Commission to be intentionally stocked in US waters, and this was subsequently done by state agencies, too; the species also spread through escapes from commercial and government ponds. It has now been reported from nine states, but its status in the United States remains uncertain as many records are old and of a few individuals and the species apparently has either failed to establish self-sustaining populations or has been eradicated.

The ide was illegally imported into New Zealand as eggs, sometime in the 1980s. Fish were subsequently released between 1985 and 1986 in no less than eight and possibly as many as 13 sites north of Auckland. Ide probably did not last very long in at least seven of the sites where releases occurred, the outcome in most of the other sites is unknown, and at least one of the release sites remains unknown. Ide likely persist in the wild in at least one site within New Zealand.

== Habitat and ecology ==
Ide occur in schools in the clear pools of larger rivers, ponds, and lakes, but they may move to deeper waters during the winter before moving into shallow fresh water to spawn in the spring. The species is also found in the Baltic Sea, which has a lower salinity than most seas, and in Sweden, the fish spend the first year of their lives in rivers before joining the more mature fish as they migrate downstream into the Baltic Sea during the summer. The fish then return to the rivers in the autumn, where they remain close to the mouths and in the lower reaches throughout the winter.

The ide reaches sexual maturity at 3–5 years of age, and once it has attained total length, which varies from 22 cm to 43 cm, although in cooler waters, it may first breed as late as 7 years of age. It spawns in shallow water in the spring, soon after the ice has melted in the colder parts of its range. Some populations are migratory and ascend rivers and streams to spawn, but others also spawn in shallow parts of lakes and sea inlets. Eggs are usually laid among gravel or on emergent vegetation. Spawning normally lasts for 3–4 days, during which the fish are very active. Each female spawns only once a season, but during spawning, she mates with several males and the males gather at spawning grounds, where they follow ripe females. The females may lay as few as 15,000 and as many as 250,000 eggs, which are about 2 mm in diameter and pale yellow in colour, in a season. The eggs hatch in 1–2 weeks, the young fry being 8–10 mm long. The actual incubation period of eggs varies depending on the water temperature, at 18.5–22.0 °C, incubation takes about 5 days, with the optimal temperature for embryonic development being in the range of 12–18 °C.

The typical prey of the ide is larval and adult insects, snails, and other benthic invertebrates for smaller fish, but larger individuals can be piscivorous, with common roach and common bleak being commonly taken. The smaller fish, larvae, and juveniles occupy a wide variety of shoreline habitats to feed, and they leave the shore areas and move into deeper waters as they grow larger. Smaller ide are sociable and join mixed shoals of other cyprinids, but the larger adult fish form smaller, single-species groups, which patrol what are believed to be regular routes. The ide prefers clear, warmer water, and is not as tolerant of eutrophication as some related species. Ide spawn in running water, so the obstruction of rivers by dams and other man-made objects can negatively affect this fish.

== Human uses ==
As an ornamental fish, the ide is usually referred to as the orfe, and the main variety kept is the golden orfe, which is golden or orange in colour with some black spots on its neck, near the head. Also, a much less common blue variety is known as the blue orfe. As they grow quite large, they are not considered to be suitable for indoor aquaria, and they recommended to be kept outside as a shoal in a pond. They require better-oxygenated water than koi or goldfish, but can be kept in association with these species. Golden orfe were very popular as an ornamental pond fish until koi became readily available in the 1960s.

In their native range, they are popular as a quarry for anglers; in eastern Europe, the ide is regarded as edible and is prized as a food fish, and are netted and sold commercially along the Danube. In more northern parts of the range, though, they are not regarded as a desirable food fish. They are also fished for as coarse fish in the United Kingdom, but there they tend to be localised to commercial fisheries or to sites where they have been introduced.
