= Striking platform =

Surface on a lithic flake on which the detachment blow falls

In the archaeological study of lithic reduction, the striking platform is the surface on the proximal portion of a lithic flake on which the detachment blow falls; this may be natural or prepared. Types of striking platforms include:

- Cortex, which consists of an area of cortex used as a platform during initial reduction;
- Single-faceted, consisting of a flat platform at right angles to the dorsal surface of the flake and most often associated with conchoidal fractures;
- Double-faceted, a variety of multifaceted, prepared platform, also characteristically flat and associated with conchoidal fractures;
- Multifaceted, with three or more facets to the platform;
- Lipped, a platform type resulting from soft hammer biface reduction; and
- Crushed, which occurs when the platform was crushed beyond easy recognition by the detachment blow.
