= Brassempouy =

- Commune
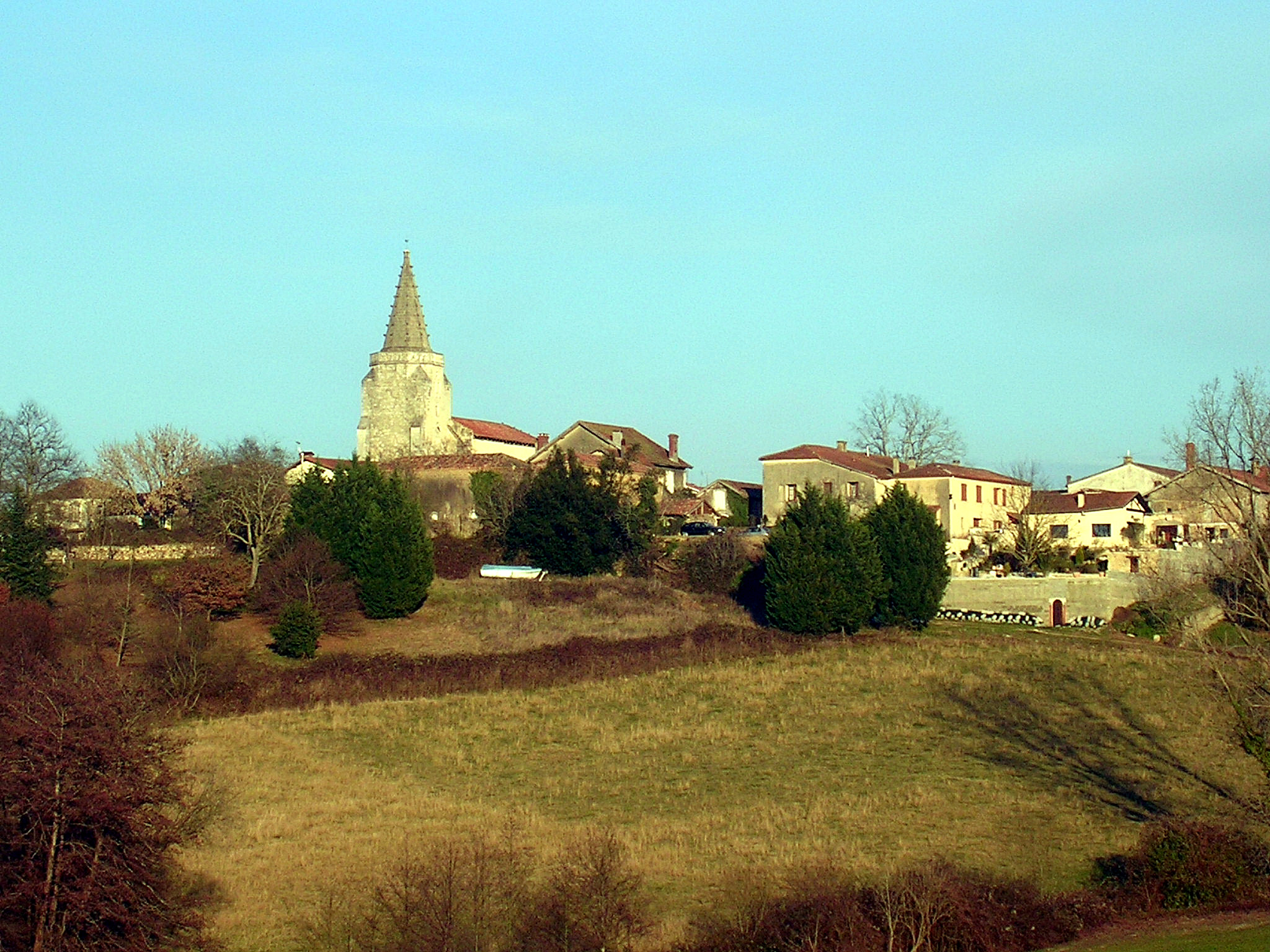
- Location of Brassempouy
- Location within France Location within Nouvelle-Aquitaine
- Coordinates: 43°37′58″N 0°41′37″W
- Country: France
- Region: Nouvelle-Aquitaine
- Department: Landes
- Arrondissement: Dax
- Canton: Coteau de Chalosse

Government
  - Mayor (2020–2026): Dominique Toulouse
- Area^{1}: 10.72 km^{2} (4.14 sq mi)
- Elevation: 120 m (390 ft)
- Highest elevation: 131 m (430 ft)
- Lowest elevation: 35 m (115 ft)
- Population (2023): 279
  - Density: 26.0/km^{2} (67.4/sq mi)
- Time zone: UTC+01:00 (CET)
  - Summer (DST): UTC+02:00 (CEST)
- INSEE/Postal code: 40054 /40330
- ^{1} French Land Register data, which excludes lakes, ponds, glaciers > 1 km^{2} (0.386 sq mi or 247 acres) and river estuaries.

Brassempouy (French pronunciation: [bʁasɛ̃puj]; Gascon: Brassempoi) is a commune in the Landes department in Nouvelle-Aquitaine in southwestern France.

The settlement is on the route between Mont-de-Marsan and Orthez.

== Population ==
Historical population
Year	Pop.	±% p.a.
1968	332	—
1975	309	−1.02%
1982	291	−0.85%
1990	279	−0.53%
1999	267	−0.49%
2007	292	+1.13%
2012	285	−0.48%
2017	267	−1.30%
2023	279	+0.74%
Source: INSEE

== Prehistoric caves ==
The village became famous for its two nearby caves, and only 100 metres from each other, were among the first Paleolithic sites to be explored in France. They are known as the Galerie des Hyènes (Gallery of the Hyenas) and the Grotte du Pape (the "Pope's Cave"), in which the Venus of Brassempouy was discovered in 1892, accompanied by eight other human figures, often ignored, and an example of unfinished work, with multiple figures of women being carved at the same time. As a result, the four museums of history were established here.

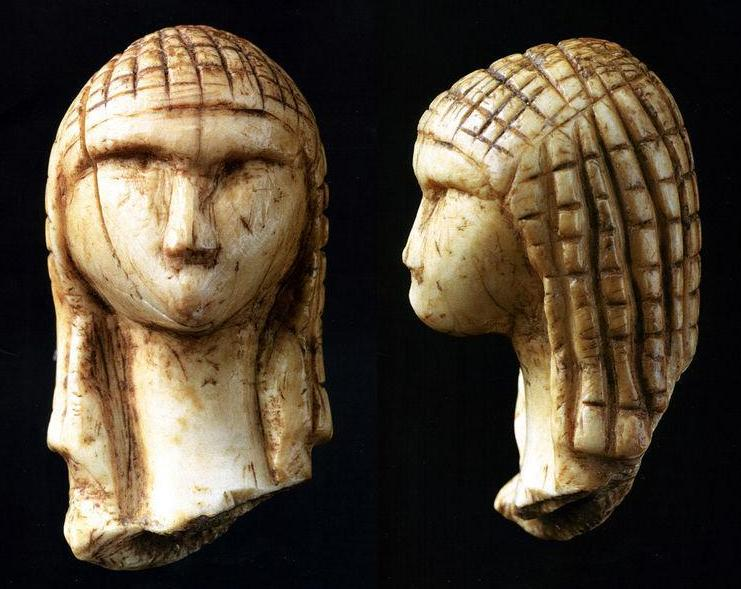
The Venus of Brassempouy

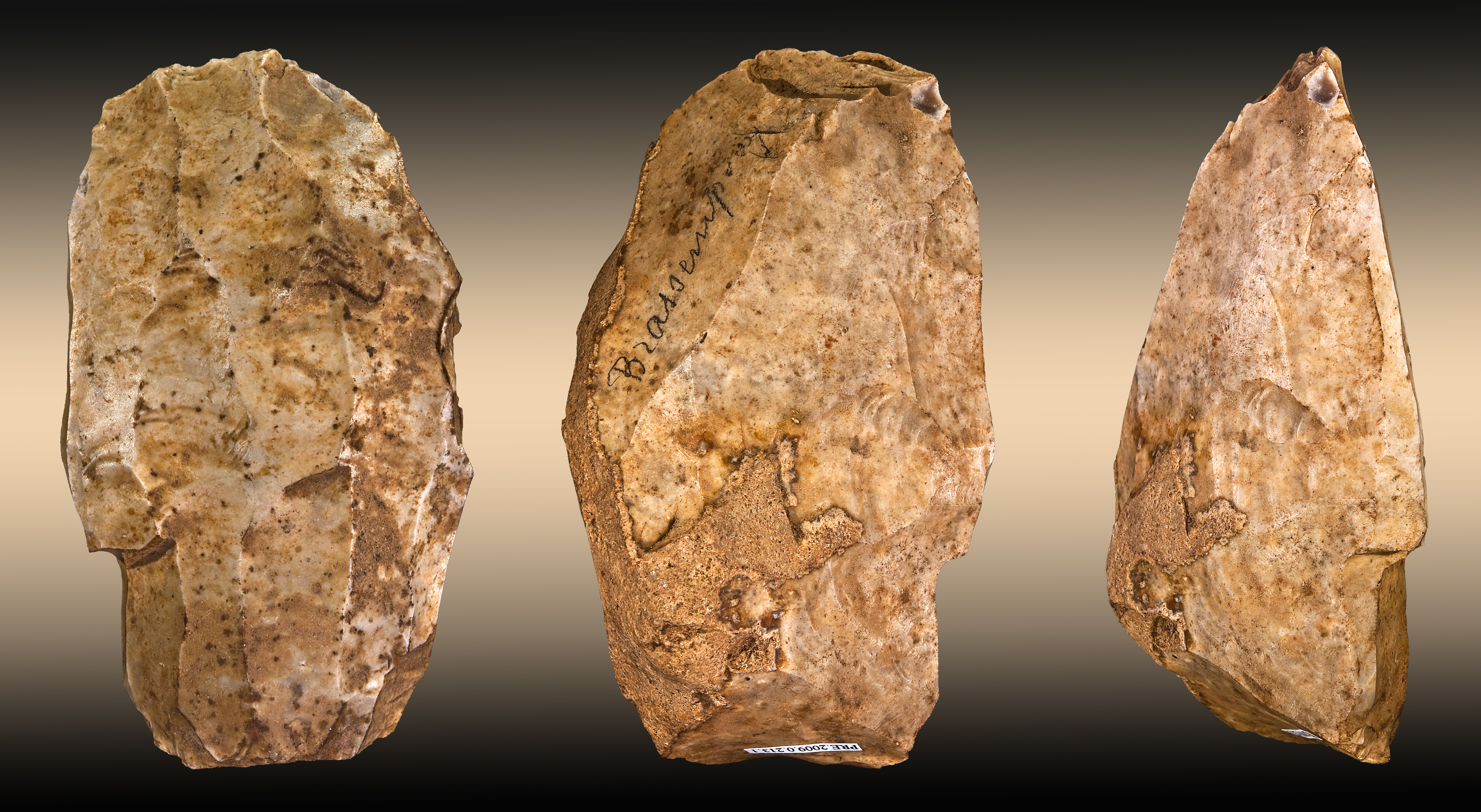
Lithic core for Lithic reduction - Upper Paleolithic Muséum of Toulouse

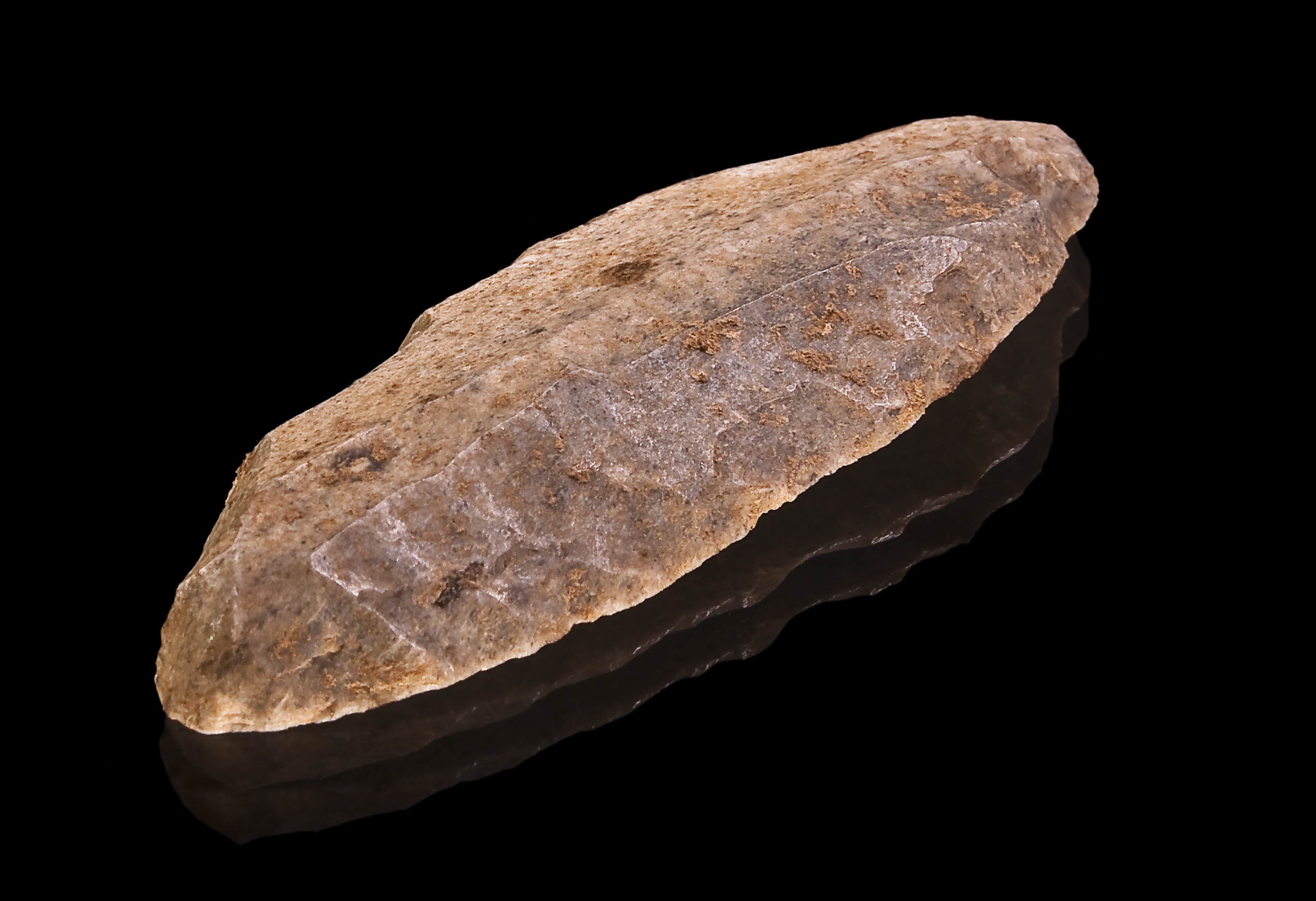
Flint blade Muséum of Toulouse

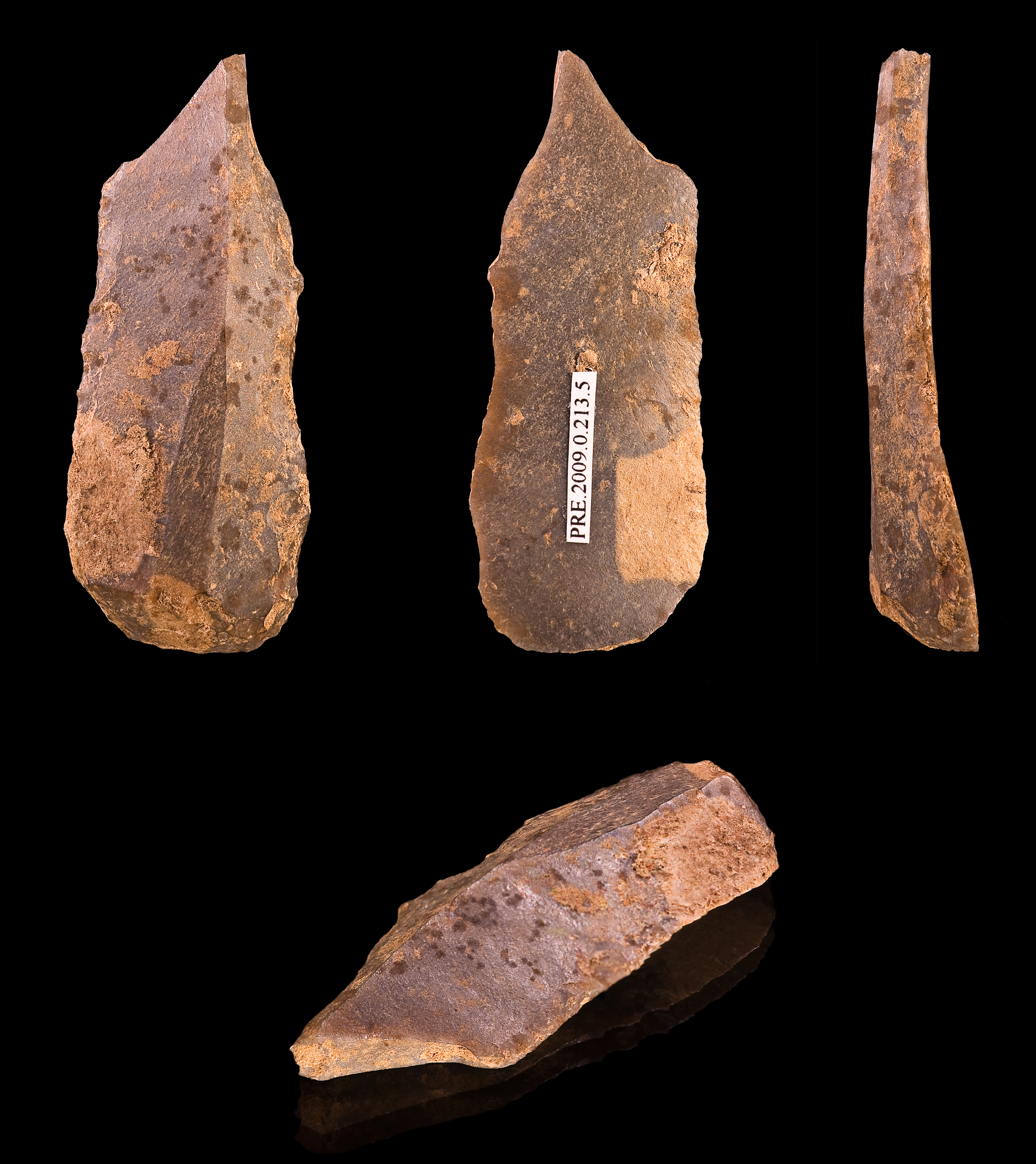
Flint Burin Upper Paleolithic Muséum of Toulouse

== See also ==
- Communes of the Landes department
