= Venus of Brassempouy =

Paleolithic carved head

Venus de Brassempouy
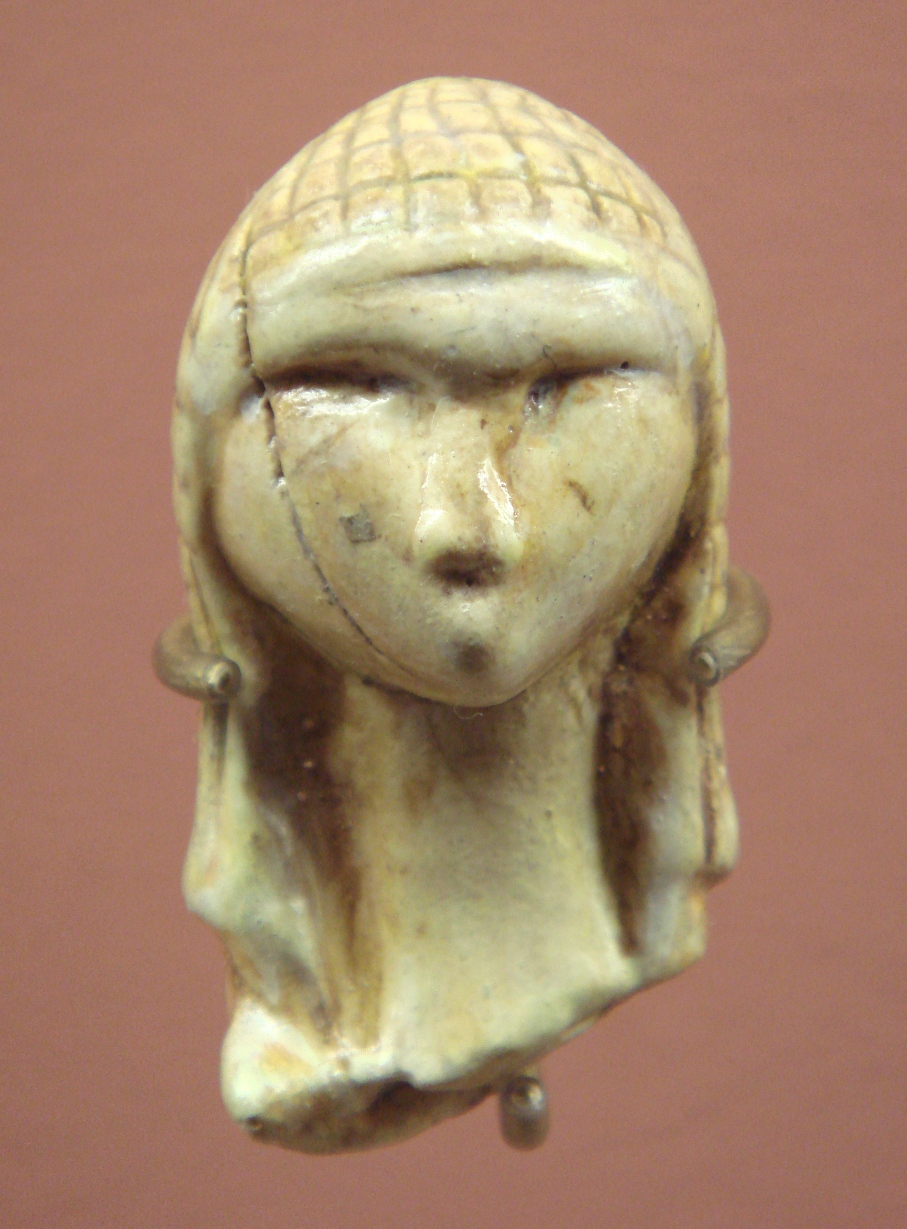
- Type: Figurine
- Material: Ivory
- Created: ~25,000 years ago
- Discovered: 1894, Brassempouy, France

Location

The Venus of Brassempouy (French: la Dame de Brassempouy, [la dam də bʁasɛ̃pwi], meaning "Lady of Brassempouy", or Dame à la Capuche, "Lady with the Hood") is a fragmentary ivory figurine from the Upper Palaeolithic, apparently broken from a larger figure at some time unknown. It was discovered in a cave at Brassempouy, France in 1894. About 25,000 years old, it is one of the earliest known realistic representations of a human face.

== Discovery ==
Brassempouy is a small village in the département of Landes in southwest France. Two caves near the village, 100 metres from each other, were among the first Paleolithic sites to be explored in France. They are known as the Galerie des Hyènes (Gallery of the Hyenas) and the Grotte du Pape (the "Grotto of the Pope"). The Venus of Brassempouy was discovered in the Grotto of the Pope in 1894, accompanied by at least eight other human figures. These may be an example of unfinished work, as if the artist or artists carved several figurines at the same time.

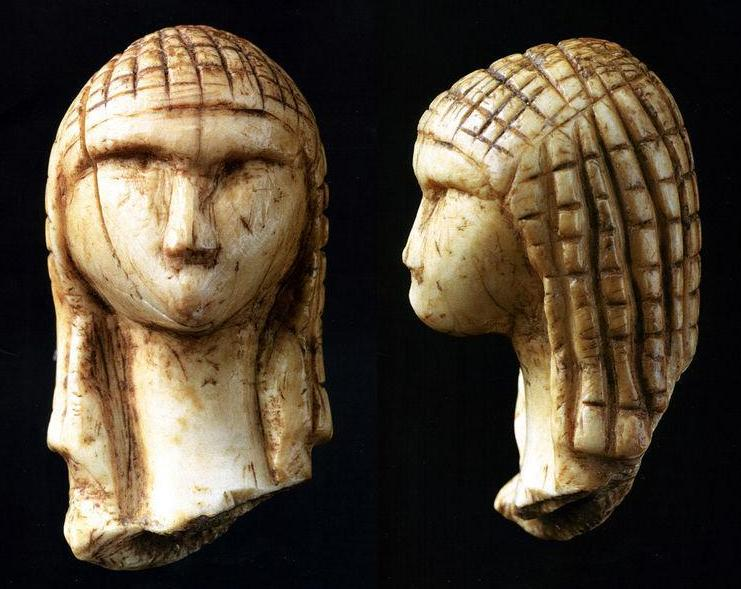
Front and side view of the Venus of Brassempouy

P. E. Dubalen first explored the Grotte du Pape during 1881, followed by J. de Laporterie and Édouard Piette (1827–1906) from 1894 onwards. Since archaeological excavation techniques were then only starting to be developed, they paid little attention to the stratigraphy of the site containing the remains. In 1892 the site was pillaged and disturbed almost beyond reconstruction by a field visit of amateurs from the Association française pour l’avancement de la science. Nevertheless, Piette described layers attributed to the late and middle Solutrean period. He termed the bottom levels he reached as éburnéen (pale or white like ivory), in reference to the copious amounts of ivory works which they contained. Modern reanalysis of the site has been performed under the direction of Henri Delporte during 1981–2000.

In 1894, one of those strata, recognized now as Gravettian, yielded several fragments of statuettes, including the "Lady with the Hood". Piette considered the figures as closely related to the representations of animals of the Magdalenian period. He developed a hypothetical chronology that was later refuted by Henri Breuil.

== Description ==
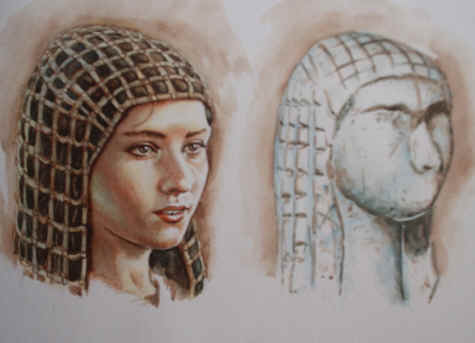
A reconstruction by Libor Balák of the Venus (or Lady) of Brassempouy, from the Western Brassempouy. The reconstruction is likely inaccurate on skin color, as Europeans are now known to have had darker skin 23-29,000 years ago. Czech Academy of Sciences, Institute of Archaeology in Brno, The Center for Paleolithic and Paleoethnological research.

The Venus of Brassempouy was carved from mammoth ivory. According to archaeologist Paul Bahn the head is "unsexed, although it is usually called a 'Venus' or a 'lady'". The head is 3.65 cm high, 2.2 cm deep and 1.9 cm wide. While the forehead, nose and brows are carved in relief, the mouth is absent. A vertical crack on the right side of the face is a consequence of the internal structure of the ivory. On the head is a checkerboard-like pattern formed by two series of shallow incisions at right angles to each other; it has been interpreted as a wig, a hood with geometric decoration, or a representation of hair styled in cornrows.

Randall White observed in the Journal of Archaeological Method and Theory (December 2006), "The figurines emerged from the ground into a colonial intellectual and socio-political context nearly obsessed with matters of race." Although the style of representation is essentially realistic, the proportions of the head do not correspond exactly to any known human population of the present or past. White has claimed that, since the mid-twentieth century, concerns of interpretative questions have changed from race to womanhood and fertility.

== Date ==
Although the head was discovered so early that its context could not be studied thoroughly, scholars agree that the Venus of Brassempouy belonged to an Upper Palaeolithic material culture, the Gravettian (29,000–22,000 BP). More precisely, they date the figurine to the Middle Gravettian period, with "Noailles" burins circa 26,000 to 24,000 BP. It is more or less contemporary with the other Palaeolithic Venus figurines, such as those of Lespugue, Dolní Věstonice, Willendorf, etc. Nonetheless, it is distinguished among the group by the realistic character of the representation.

Other broadly contemporary representations of female faces include the female face from Dolní Věstonice (c. 26,000 BP), or the Venuses with faces of the Mal'ta Culture (Siberia, 24,000 BP).

== Display ==
"La figurine à la Ceinture" (The figurine with a belt), one of several Venus figurines discovered alongside the Venus of Brassempouy

The Venus of Brassempouy is preserved in the Musée d'Archéologie Nationale at Saint-Germain-en-Laye, near Paris Since ivory is very susceptible to damage from factors such as temperature change, moisture, and light, the figure is not part of the Palaeolithic department, but is exhibited in the Salle Piette of the Museum, opened only by reservation.

At Brassempouy, a variety of objects excavated in the Grotte du Pape are on display at the Maison de la Dame. This exhibition space, devoted primarily to regional archaeology, also displays a fine set of casts of Palaeolithic sculptures. These include the nine existing specimens from Brassempouy, but also casts of the well-known figures from Lespugue, Willendorf and Dolní Věstonice, as well as the Mal'ta Venuses, and the Grimaldi Venuses.

== Stamp ==
In 1976, the Venus of Brassempouy was depicted on a 2 franc stamp. It has also been the motif of a 15 franc (CFA) stamp of the Republic of Mali.

== See also ==
- Art of the Upper Paleolithic
- List of Stone Age art
- Venus figurines

== Bibliography ==
- H. Delporte, Brassempouy – la grotte du Pape, station préhistorique, Association culturelle de Contis, 1980
- H. Delporte, L'image de la femme dans l'art préhistorique, éd. Picard, 1993 (ISBN 2-7084-0440-7)
- C. Cohen, La femme des origines - images de la femme dans la préhistoire occidentale, Belin - Herscher, 2003 (ISBN 2-7335-0336-7)
- P. Perrève, La dame à la capuche - roman historique - Ed. Olivier Orban, 1984, (ISBN 2-85565-244-8)
