= Lithic flake =

Portion of rock removed from an objective piece by percussion or pressure

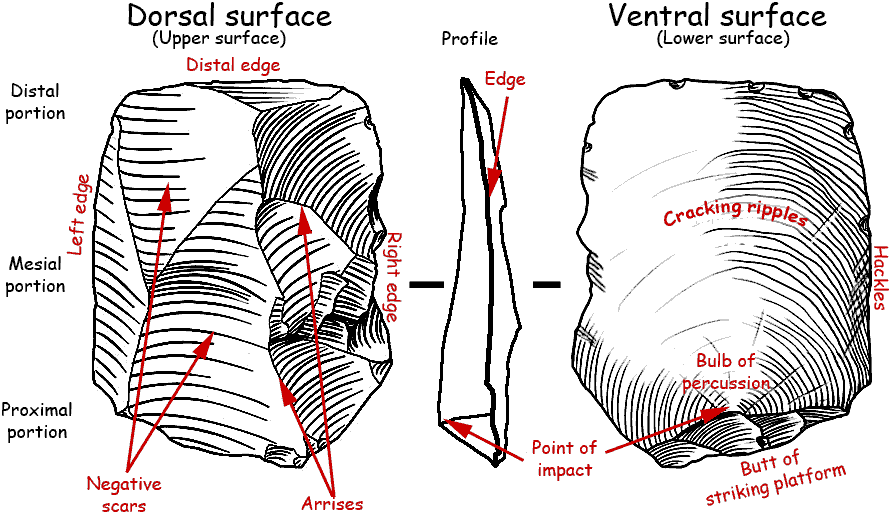
Fundamental elements for the technic description of a lithic flake

In archaeology, a lithic flake is a "portion of rock removed from an objective piece by percussion or pressure," and may also be referred to as simply a flake, or collectively as debitage. The objective piece, or the rock being reduced by the removal of flakes, is known as a core. Once the proper tool stone has been selected, a percussor or pressure flaker (e.g., an antler tine) is used to direct a sharp blow, or apply sufficient force, respectively, to the surface of the stone, often on the edge of the piece. The energy of this blow propagates through the material, often (but not always) producing a Hertzian cone of force which causes the rock to fracture in a controllable fashion. Since cores are often struck on an edge with a suitable angle (<90°) for flake propagation, the result is that only a portion of the Hertzian cone is created. The process continues as the flintknapper detaches the desired number of flakes from the core, which is marked with the negative scars of these removals. The surface area of the core which received the blows necessary for detaching the flakes is referred to as the striking platform.

== Production ==
Flakes may be produced by a variety of means. Force may be introduced by direct percussion (striking the core with a percussor such as a rock or antler), indirect percussion (striking the core with an object, sometimes referred to as a "punch", which itself is struck by a percussor, similar to the use of a hammer and chisel to shape stone), or by pressure. Additionally, flakes may be initiated in a Hertzian, bending, or wedging fashion. When a flake is detached from its core in a Hertzian fashion, the flake propagates in a conchoidal manner from the point of impact or pressure, usually producing a partial Hertzian cone. The cone of force often leaves a distinctive bulb of applied force on the flake and a corresponding flake scar on the core. A bending initiation results when a flake initiates not at the point where the force was applied, but rather further away from the edge of the core, resulting in a flake with no Hertzian cone or bulb of applied force and few if any of the characteristics ripples or undulations seen on the ventral surface of conchoidally produced flakes. Wedging initiation is the result of a strong hammer blow. At impact, concentric radii emanate from the point of percussion, but unlike conchoidal fracture, the force travels along what would be the center of the Hertzian cone. The bipolar reduction technique is typified by its use of wedge initiation. Like bending initiation, no bulb of applied force results from wedging initiation, although in the bipolar technique, flakes may appear to have two points of percussion, on opposite ends, because the core has been fractured by a hammer and anvil technique. The core is placed on a hard surface or "anvil" and is struck above by a hammer, thus the fracture may propagate from both ends simultaneously.

The end which received the blow or pressure is referred to as the proximal end of the flake; the terminal end is referred to as the distal end. The side displaying the bulb of force but without flake scars (barring an errailure flake scar or additional working of the flake) is called the ventral (or interior) surface, while the opposite side, displaying the flake scars of previous removals, or the cortical or original rock surface, is the dorsal (or exterior) surface.

On most natural cobbles or nodules of source material, a weathered outer rind called a cortex covers the unweathered inner material. Flakes are often differentiated by the amount of cortex present on their dorsal surfaces, because the amount of cortex indicates when in the sequence of reduction the flake came from. Primary flakes are those whose dorsal surfaces are entirely covered with cortex; secondary flakes have at least a trace of cortex on the dorsal surface; and tertiary (interior) flakes lack cortex, having derived entirely from the interior of the core. Primary flakes and secondary flakes are usually associated with the initial stages of lithic reduction, while tertiary flakes are more likely to be associated with retouching and bifacial reduction activities.

Prominent bulbs of force generally indicate that a hard hammer percussor (hammerstone) was used to detach the flake; flakes displaying this characteristic are referred to as conchoidal flakes. Hard hammer flakes are indicative of primary reduction strategies (e.g., core reduction, roughing of blanks and preforms, and the like). More moderate and diffuse bulbs may indicate the use of a soft hammer percussor—such as bone, wood, or antler—which produces the bending flakes often associated with bifacial thinning and trimming. The relative abundance of each type of flake can indicate what sort of lithic work was going on at a particular spot at a particular point in time.

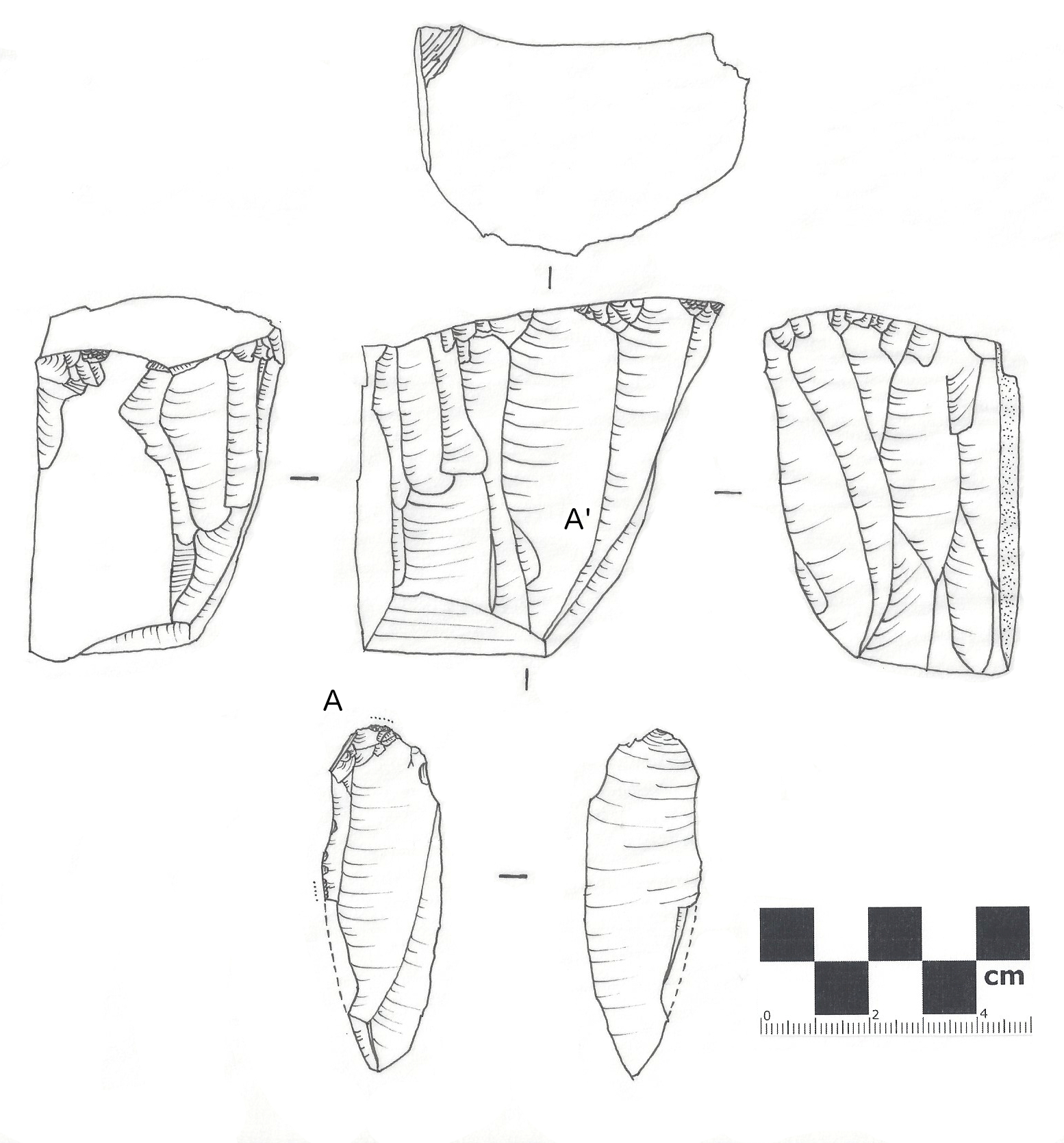
Prismatic blade and its core that made with prismatic reduction technology. The blade flake that marks with A can fit to where A' marks on this core.

A blade is defined as a flake with parallel or subparallel margins that is usually at least twice as long as it is wide. There are numerous specialized types of blade flakes. Channel flakes are characteristic flakes caused by the fluting of certain Paleo-Indian projectile points; such fluting produced grooves in the projectile points which may have facilitated hafting. Prismatic blades are long, narrow specialized blades with parallel margins which may be removed from polyhedral blade cores, another common lithic feature of Paleo-Indian lithic culture. Prismatic blades are often triangular in cross section with several facets or flake scars on the dorsal surface. Prismatic blades begin to appear in high frequencies during the transition between the Middle and Upper Paleolithic.This lithic technology basically replaces the Levallois reduction technology.

== Other flake characteristics ==
The striking platform is the point on the proximal portion of the flake on which the detachment blow fell or pressure was placed. This may be natural or prepared. Termination type is a characteristic indicating the manner in which the distal end of a flake detached from a core. Flake terminations may be feathered, hinged, stepped, or plunging (also known as overshot or outrepassé). Feathered terminations are often very sharp, as the flake gradually reduces to a very fine thickness before the force exits the core and removes the flake. Hinged terminations are the result of the force rolling away from the core, resulting in a rounded distal end. Step terminations result when a flake prematurely breaks or snaps during removal, leaving a distal end that is often squared off. Plunging flakes are the result of the force rolling back towards the core and often taking off its "bottom". Hinge, step, and plunging terminations, although sometimes deliberately formed, are usually errors called "abrupt terminations". Abrupt terminations are often indicative of internal flaws in a core or previously formed Hertzian cones on the surface. Eraillures, also referred to as "bulbar scars", are tiny flake scars that appear on some bulbs of applied force. The reason they form is not entirely understood. Of those flakes that do exhibit eraillures, very few have more than one.

Secondary and tertiary flakes display dorsal flake scars, which are simply the markings left behind by flakes detached prior to the detachment of the subject flake. These flake scars are one of the lines of evidence used to infer the method of lithic reduction, or the process by which raw material is turned into useful objects.

=== Tools ===
Flakes can be modified into formal tools, which result from additional working of the piece to shape a flake into a desired form, or they can be used without further modification, and are then referred to as expedient tools. For example, scrapers, which may be made by additional removals, known as retouchings, to the edge of a piece, or burins, which are created by a burin blow on the tip of a blade which produces a chisel-like edge which may have been used for graving and carving wood or bone. Because they require less labor to create, expedient flakes can be used strategically as a useful tool for a situation that does not necessarily require a sharpened tool necessary for cutting.
