= Lithic core =

In archaeology, a stone artifact left over from toolmaking

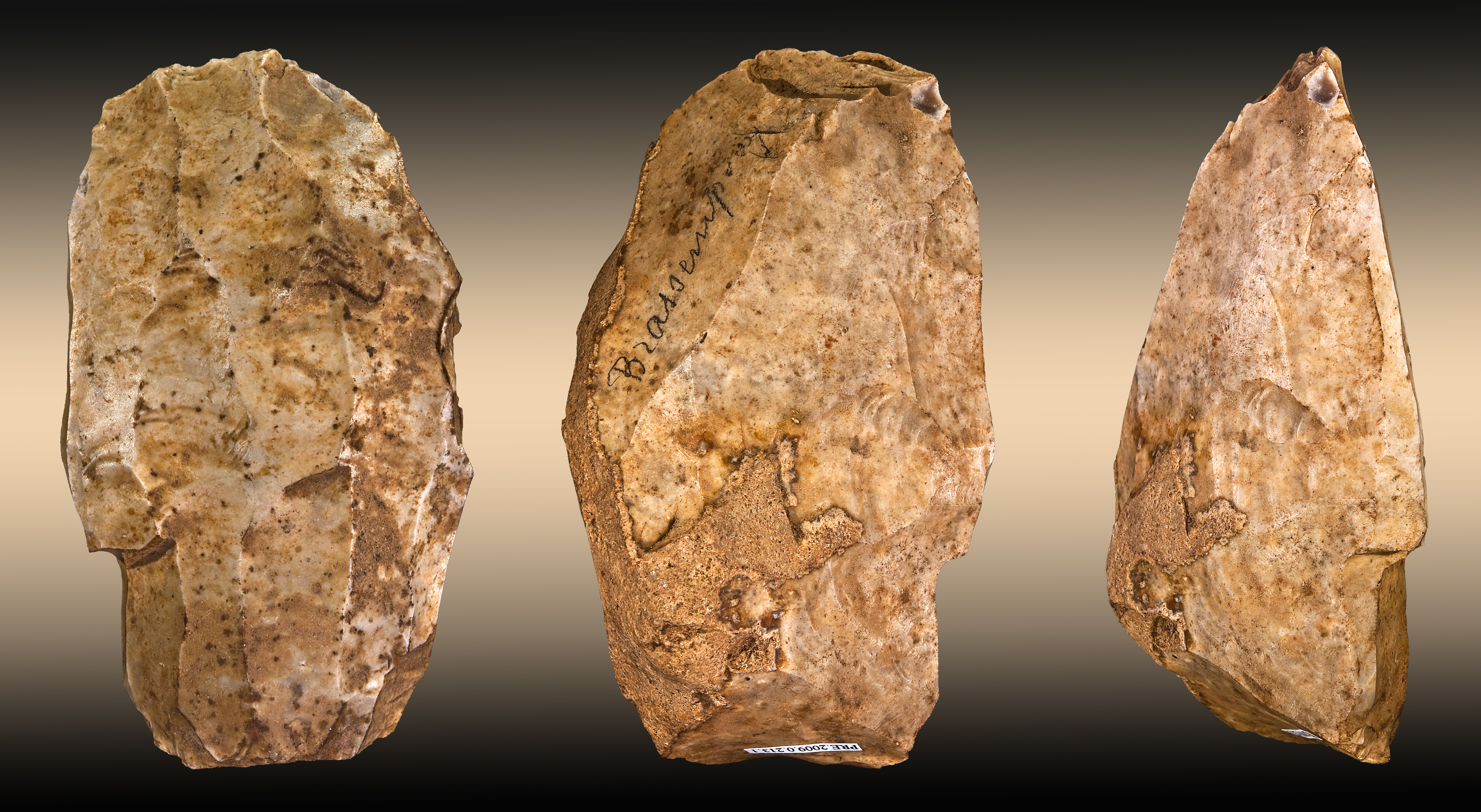
Lithic core for Lithic reduction - Upper Paleolithic (Gravitation) (–29,000; –22,000) -Brassempouy, Lands department, France - Museum of Toulouse

In archaeology, a lithic core is a distinctive artifact that results from the practice of lithic reduction. In this sense, a core is the scarred nucleus resulting from the detachment of one or more flakes from a lump of source material or tool stone, usually by using a hard hammer precursor such as a hammerstone. The core is marked with the negative scars of these flakes. The surface area of the core which received the blows necessary for detaching the flakes is referred to as the striking platform. The core may be discarded or shaped further into a core tool, such as can be seen in some types of handaxe.

== Definitions ==
A "core" can be defined in a number of different ways based on the theoretical and methodological approach of the archaeologist. Typological approaches to classify cores are generally based on a combination of the technological attributes and presumed function of an artefact while technological approaches are generally based solely on the technological attributes and an artefacts place in the overall reduction sequence. Other terms used for core include "nucleus" or "objective piece".

== Function ==
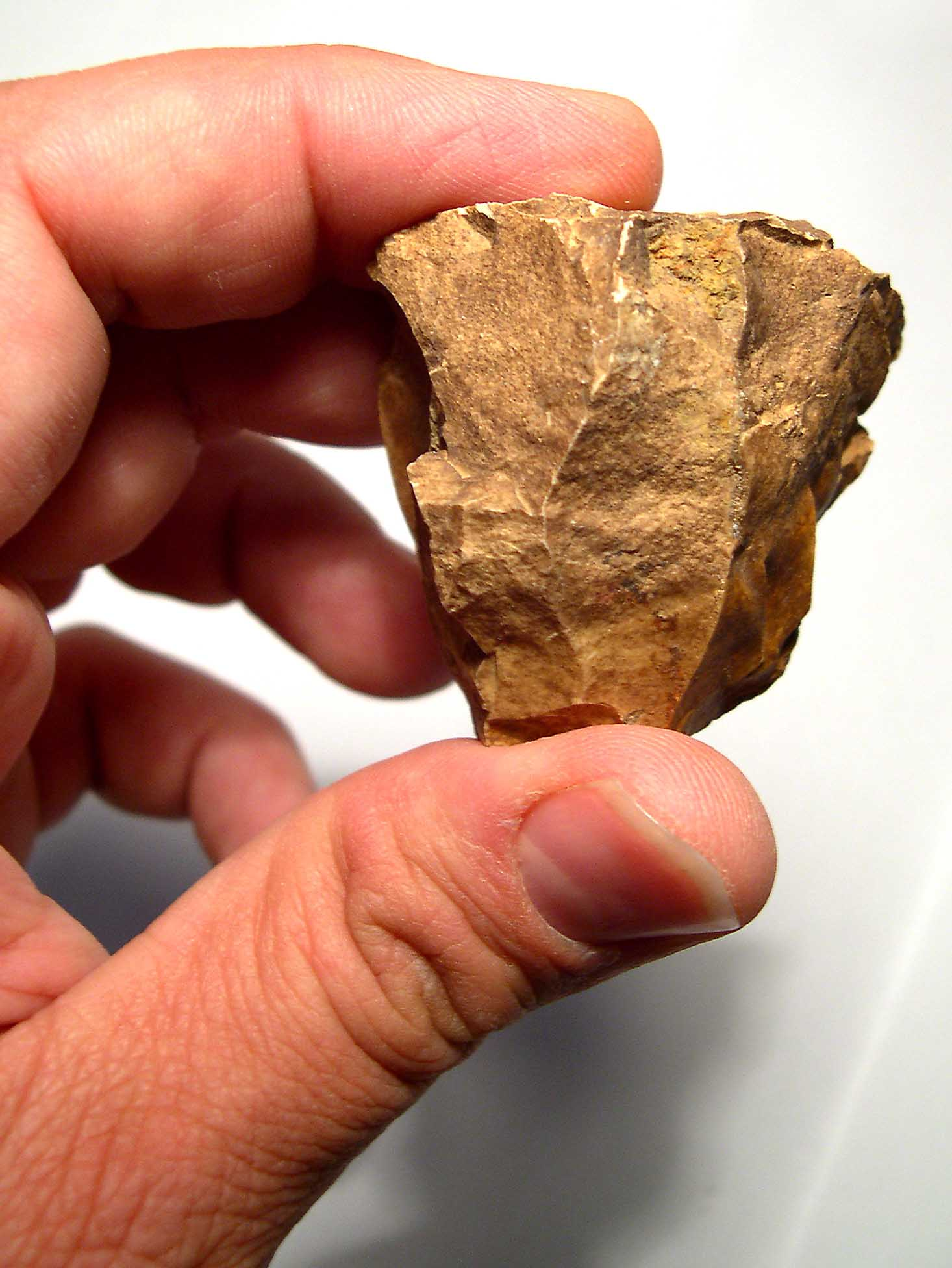
A flint lithic core for blades, found near the cave of La Viña (Asturias, Spain)

The purpose of core reduction may be to rough out a blank for later refinement into a projectile point, knife, or other stone tool, or it may be performed in order to obtain sharp flakes, from which a variety of simple tools can be made. Generally, the presence of a core is indicative of the latter process, since the former process usually leaves no core. Because the morphology of cores will influence the shape of flakes, by studying the core surface morphology, we might be able to know more information about the dimensional flake attribute, including their length and thickness.

== Types of cores ==
Cores may be subdivided into specific types by a lithic analyst. Type frequencies, as well as the general types of materials at an archaeological site, can give the lithic analyst a better understanding of the lithic reduction processes occurring at that site.

Cores may be described on the basis of the direction of flake removals, the number of faces with negative flake scars or the general morphology of the core. Examples of this include multidirectional, conical, cylindrical, biconical, or bifacial cores. A multidirectional core is the product of any random rock, from which flakes were taken based on the geometry of the rock in any pattern until no further flakes could be removed. Often, multidirectional cores are used in this way until no obvious platforms are present, and then are reduced through bipolar reduction, until the core itself is too small to produce useful flakes. Conical cores have a definite pattern. One flake was removed from a narrow end of the tool stone, and this was then used as the platform to take flakes off in a unifacial fashion all around the edge of the rock. The result is a cone-like shape. Cylindrical lithic cores are made in a similar fashion, but there is a platform on both ends of the tool stone, with flakes going up and down the side of the cylinder from either direction.

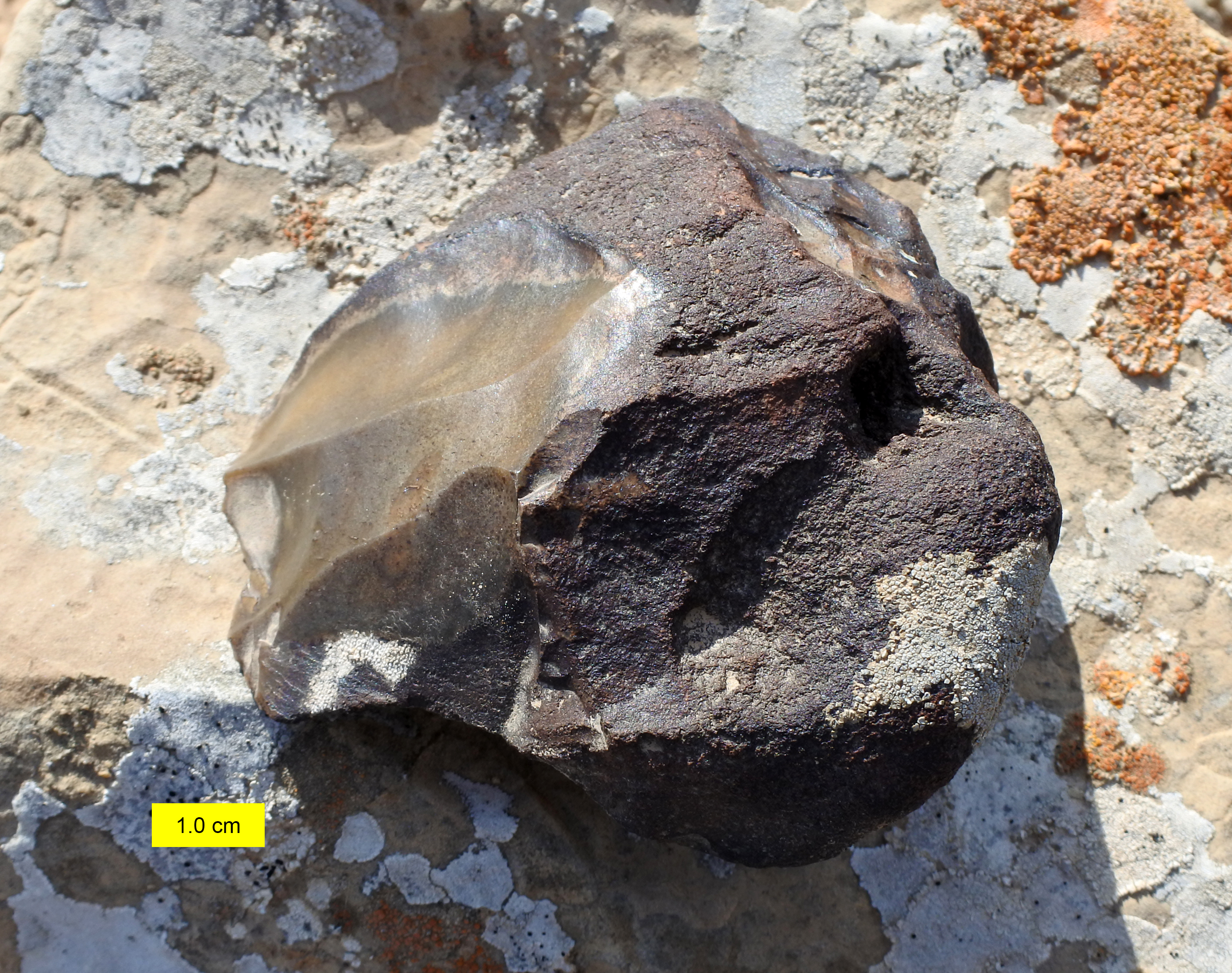
Lithic core (Mousterian) from Makhtesh Gadol, southern Israel.

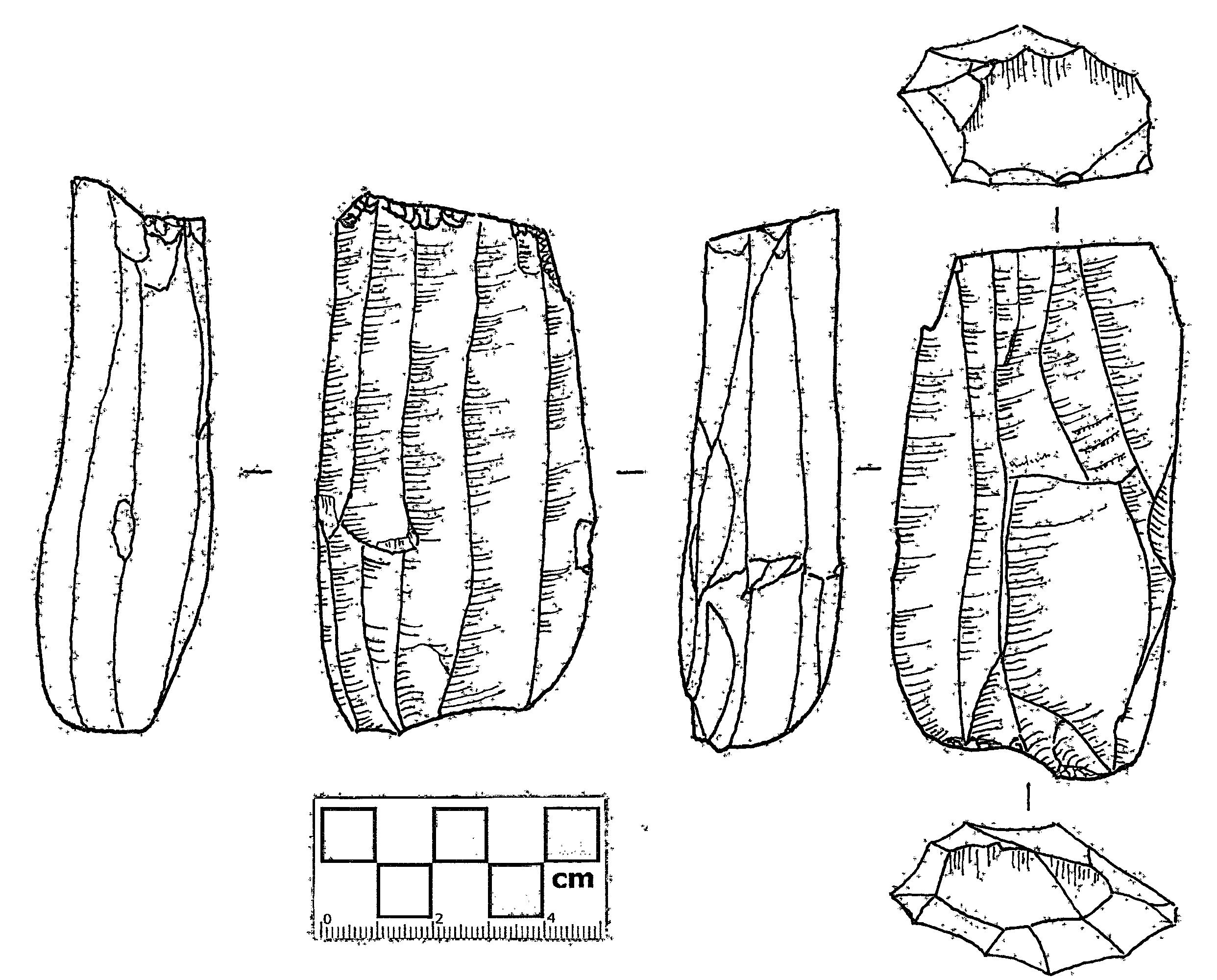
Upper paleolithic cylindrical blade core, France. Courtesy of the Burke Museum.

Biconical cores have several platforms around the edge of the stone, with flakes taken alternately from either side, resulting in what looks like a pair of cones stuck together at the bases. Bifacial cores are similar to biconical cores, except that instead of forming a pair of cones, the flakes are taken off in such a way that the core itself grows thinner, without the edges shrinking much. Bifacial cores are usually further reduced into trade bifaces, biface blanks, or bifacial tools. Bifacial cores have been recognized as a technology allowing for efficient material usage (specifically in the creation of edge scrapers) and for their suitability for highly mobile hunter gatherer groups in need of tools made of high-quality lithic materials.
