= Montgaillard, Landes =

Montgaillard
- Commune
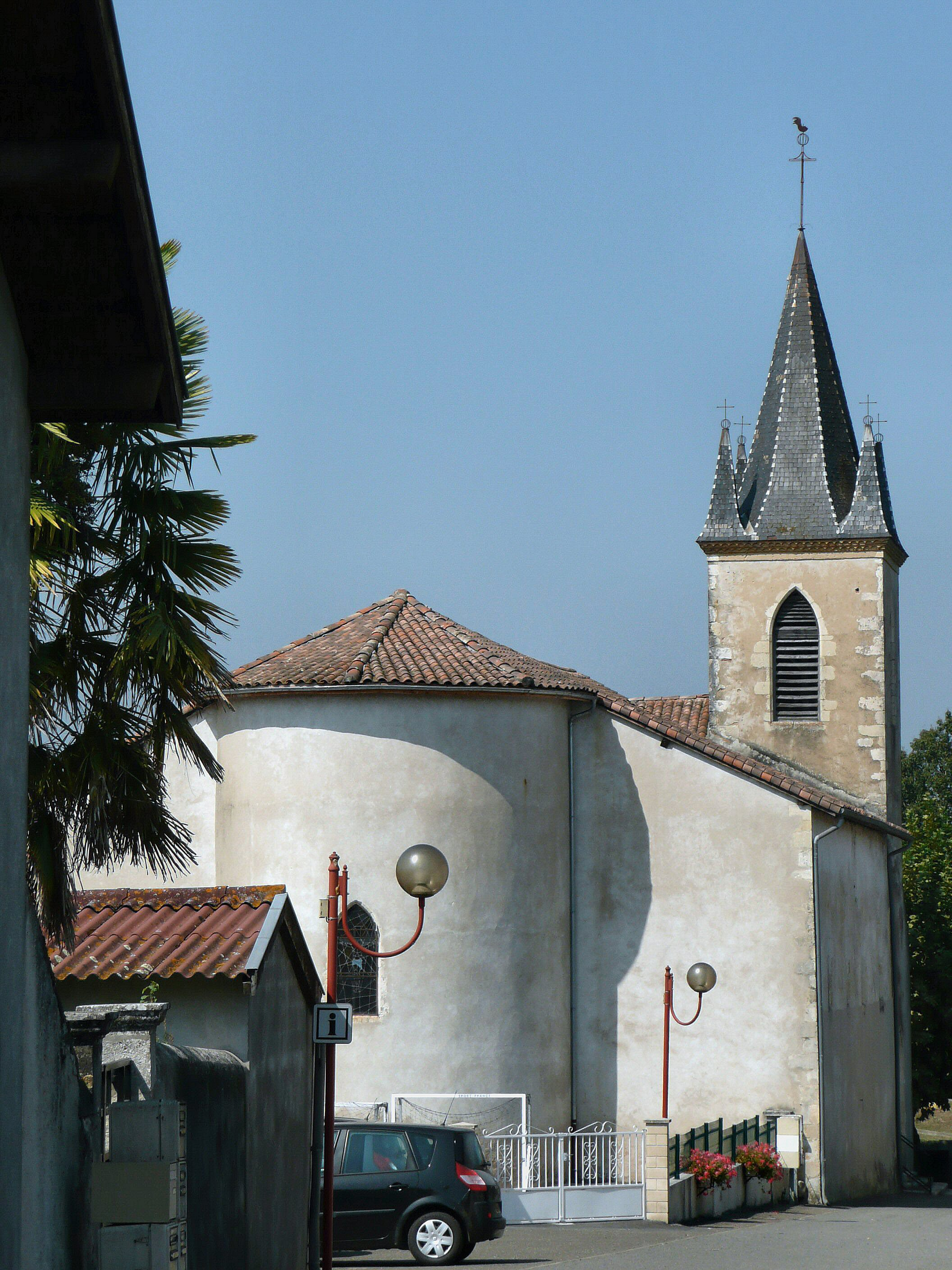
- Location of Montgaillard
- Location within France Location within Nouvelle-Aquitaine
- Coordinates: 43°44′35″N 0°28′54″W
- Country: France
- Region: Nouvelle-Aquitaine
- Department: Landes
- Arrondissement: Mont-de-Marsan
- Canton: Chalosse Tursan

Government
  - Mayor (2020–2026): Patrick Passard
- Area^{1}: 20.46 km^{2} (7.90 sq mi)
- Elevation: 167 m (548 ft)
- Highest elevation: 124 m (407 ft)
- Lowest elevation: 38 m (125 ft)
- Population (2023): 602
  - Density: 29.4/km^{2} (76.2/sq mi)
- Time zone: UTC+01:00 (CET)
  - Summer (DST): UTC+02:00 (CEST)
- INSEE/Postal code: 40195 /40500
- ^{1} French Land Register data, which excludes lakes, ponds, glaciers > 1 km^{2} (0.386 sq mi or 247 acres) and river estuaries.

Montgaillard (French pronunciation: [mɔ̃ɡajaʁ]; Gascon: Montgalhard) is a commune in the Landes department in Nouvelle-Aquitaine in southwestern France.

== Population ==
Historical population
Year	Pop.	±% p.a.
1968	508	—
1975	443	−1.94%
1982	462	+0.60%
1990	464	+0.05%
1999	484	+0.47%
2007	561	+1.86%
2012	602	+1.42%
2017	631	+0.95%
2023	602	−0.78%
Source: INSEE

== See also ==
- Communes of the Landes department
