= Burin (lithic flake) =

Stone age tool

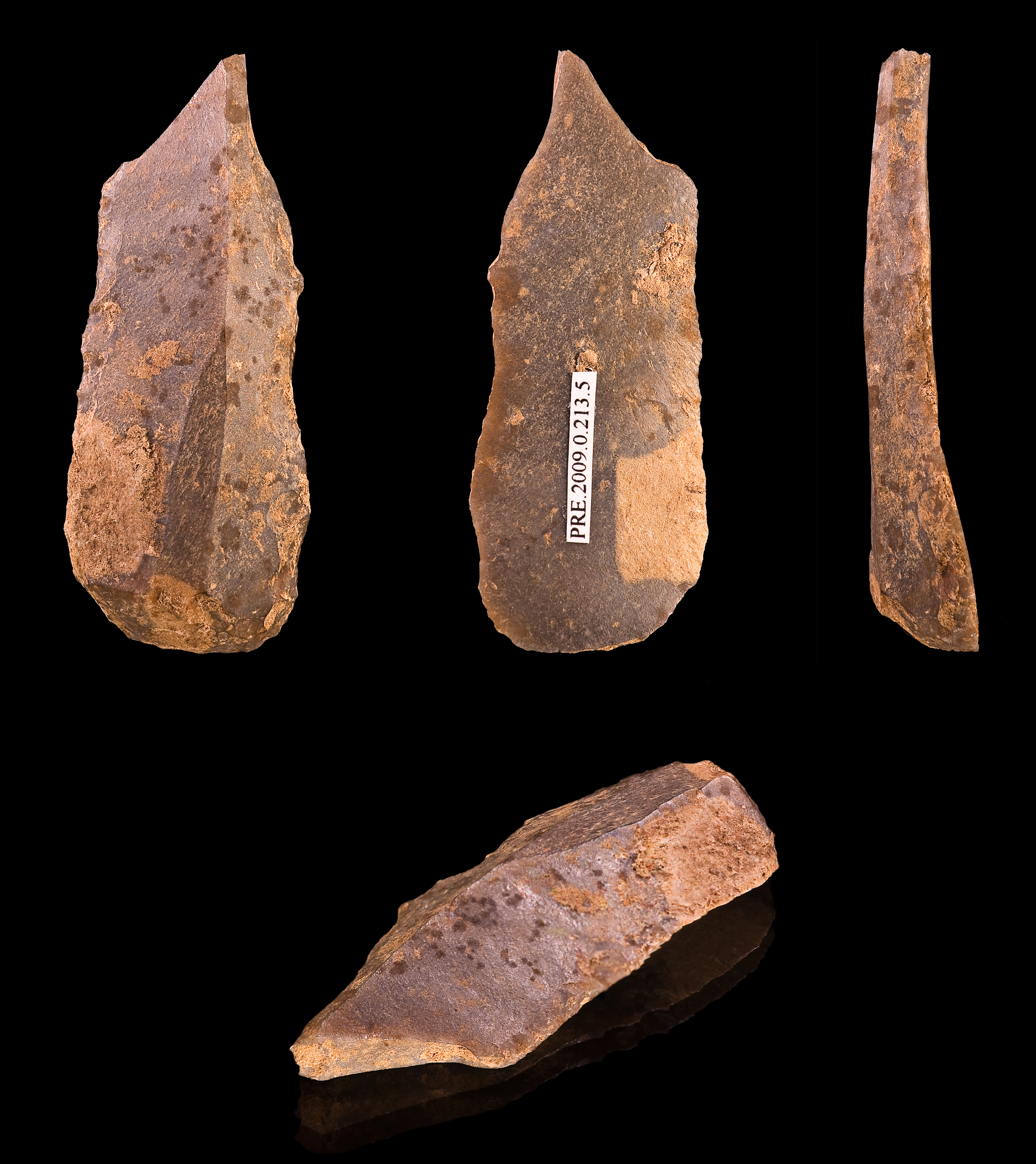
Burin from the Upper Paleolithic (Gravettian) (ca. 29,000–22,000 BP)

In archaeology and the field of lithic reduction, a burin /ˈbjuːrɪn/ (from the French burin, meaning "cold chisel" or modern engraving burin) is a type of stone tool, a handheld lithic flake with a chisel-like edge which prehistoric humans used for carving or finishing wood or bone tools or weapons, and sometimes for engraving images.

In archaeology, burin use is often associated with "burin spalls", which are a form of debitage created when toolmakers strike a small flake obliquely from the edge of the burin flake in order to form the graving edge.

== Documented use ==
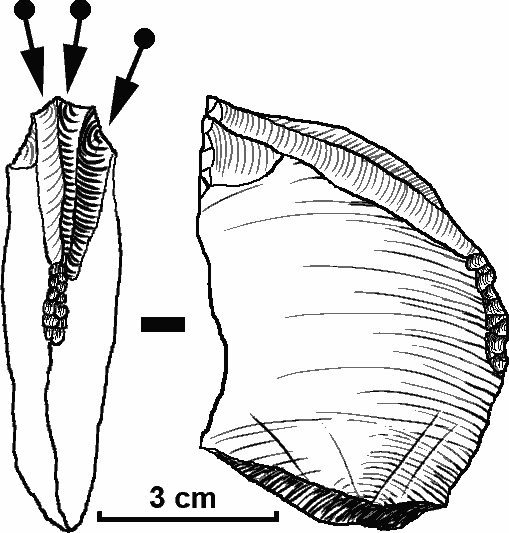
Carinated "burin"/microblade core with multiple facets

Standardized burin usage is typical of the Middle Paleolithic and Upper Palaeolithic cultures in Europe, but archaeologists have also identified them in North American cultural assemblages, and in his book Early Man in China, Jia Lanpo of Beijing University lists dihedral burins and burins for truncation among artifacts uncovered along the banks of the Liyigon river near Xujiayao.

Burins can also be associated with compound microblade projectile technology, found with microblade cores and/or microblades. In these cases, their purpose is interpreted as both a rapid retouch and hafting preparation strategy for blade-based edge tools and bifaces and as a class of dedicated flake or blade-based tools used to insert microblades and other microliths into organic armatures.

== Types ==
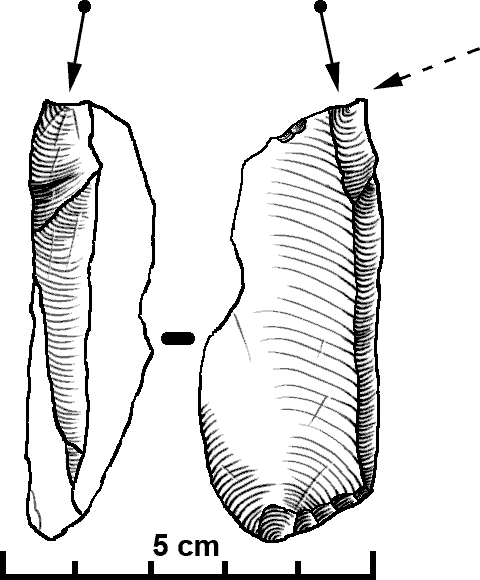
Dihedral burin on a blade

Multiple types of burin exist.

A type of burin diagnostic of the archaeological stratum where they are found is the "Noailles" burin, named for its original find-site, the Grotte de Noailles, in the commune of Brive-la-Gaillarde, Corrèze, in southwestern France. It consists of a small multiple burin characteristic of the Upper Paleolithic cultural stage called the Gravettian, ca. 28–23,000 BC; these flake tools have been restruck and refined to give several chisellike edges and a blunt, grippable rear edge.

Another type of burin is called the "ordinary burin", which occurs when a burin facet is backed against another burin facet.

A bec-de-flute burin, or "axial burin" began as a long flake, but one of both ends have been knocked off, giving two working facets meeting at an angle.
