= Prix Saintour =

Prize from Académie française

The Prix Saintour is a series of prizes awarded annually by each of the five institutions making up the Institut de France since 1835.

It is an annual literary prize, created by the Académie française and awarded from 1893 to 1989

The Académie des inscriptions et belles-lettres and the Academie des sciences morales et politiques still award the prix Saintour.

== Laureates of the Académie Française ==
=== From 1893 to 1924 ===
- 1893 :
  - Gaston de Raimes (1859-19..) for Soldats de France, actions héroïques
  - André Saglio for Maisons d'hommes célèbres
- 1894 :
  - Charles-Louis Livet (1828–1898) for Lexique comparé de la langue de Molière et des autres écrivains
- 1895 :
  - Edmond Huguet for Étude sur la syntaxe de Rabelais
  - Maxime Lanusse (1853–1930) for De l'influence du dialecte gascon sur la langue française, de la fin du XVe siècle à la seconde moitié du XVIIe siècle
  - Abbé Charles Urbain (1852–1930) for Nicolas Coeffeteau (1574–1623)
- 1896 :
  - Napoléon-Maurice Bernardin for Un précurseur de Racine, Tristan l'Hermite, sieur Du Solier (1601–1655)
  - Abel Lefranc for Les dernières poésies de Marguerite de Navarre
- 1897 :
  - Arsène Darmesteter for Cours historiques de la langue française
  - Gustave Michaut for Pensées de Pascal
- 1898 :
  - Léon Brunschvicg for Blaise Pascal
  - Abbé Joseph Lebarq (1844–1897) for Œuvres oratoires de Bossuet
  - Maurice Souriau (1856-195.?) for La préface de Cromwell, de Victor Hugo
- 1899 :
  - Louis Arnould for Racan (1589–1670)
  - Armand Gasté for La querelle du Cid
- 1900 :
  - Ferdinand Brunot for Histoire de la langue française, des origines à nos jours
  - Louis Clément (1858-19..) for Henri Estienne et son œuvre française
- 1901 :
  - Joseph Bédier for Le roman de Tristan et Iseut
  - Henri Chamard for Joachim du Bellay (1522–1560)
  - Arthur and Paul Desfeuilles (1822-1907 et 1866–1943) for Lexique de la langue de Molière
- 1902 :
  - Auguste Hamon (1860–1935) for Jean Bouchet (1476–1557), a study of Jean Bouchet
  - Charles Marty-Laveaux for all of his works on the 16th century
- 1903 :
  - Guillaume Hüszar (1872–1931) for Corneille et le théâtre espagnol
  - Elvire Samfiresco for Ménage : polémiste, philologue, poète
  - Léon Séché for Œuvres complètes de Joachim du Bellay
- 1904 :
  - Antoine Albalat for Le travail du style enseigné par les corrections manuscrites des grands écrivains
  - Henri Chardon (1834–1906) for Scarron inconnu. Les personnages du roman comique
  - Remy de Gourmont for La culture des idées, Le problème du style and Esthétique de la langue française
  - Georges Doncieux (1856–1903) for Le romancero populaire de la France
- 1905 :
  - Henri Chamard for Joachim du Bellay. La Défense et illustration de la langue française
  - Ferdinand Gohin (1867–1944) for Les transformations de la langue française au XVIIIe siècle (1740–1789)
  - Paul Laumonier (1867–1949) for Œuvres poétiques de Jacques Péletier du Mans
  - Jacques Trénel (1858-....) for L'Ancien Testament et la langue française du moyen-âge. L'élément biblique dans l'œuvre d'Agrippa d'Aubigné
- 1906 :
  - Joseph Anglade for Le troubadour Guiraut Riquier, étude de la décadence de l'ancienne poésie provençale
  - Félix Piquet for L'originalité de Gottfried de Strasbourg dans son poème de Tristan et Isolde
- 1907 :
  - Louis Lautrey for Journal de voyage de Montaigne
  - Louis Mellerio (1859-19..) for Lexique de Ronsard
  - Fortunat Strowski for Édition des Essais de Michel de Montaigne
- 1908 :
  - Edmond Girard (1860–1928) for les Œuvres de Tristan l'Hermite
  - Edmond Huguet for Petit glossaire des classiques français du XVIIe siècle
  - Abbé J.-A. Quillacq for La langue et la syntaxe de Bossuet
  - Robert Lindsay Graeme Ritchie (1880–1954) for Recherches sur la syntaxe de la conjonction "que" dans l'ancien français
- 1909 :
  - René Onillon (1854-19..) and Anatole-Joseph Verrier (1841–1920) for Glossaire étymologique et historique des patois et des parlers de l'Anjou
  - Théodore Rosset for Entretien, doutes, critique et remarques du Père Bouhours sur la langue française (1671–1692)
- 1910 :
  - Bulletin du parler français au Canada
  - Vladimir Chichmarev (1874–1957) for Guillaume de Machaut. Poésies lyriques
  - Frédéric Lachèvre for Le libertinage devant le Parlement de Paris. Le procès du poète Théophile de Viau (11 juillet 1623-1er septembre 1625)
  - Hugues Vaganay (1870–1936) for Les amours de P. de Ronsard Vandomois, commentées par Marc-Antoine de Muret
- 1911 :
  - Gustave Boissière (1850–1927) for Remarques sur les poésies de Malherbe, de Urbain Chevreau
  - Ferdinand Gohin (1867–1944) for Œuvres poétiques, de Antoine Héroët
  - Abbé Eugène Griselle (1861–1923) for Éditions de Bossuet et Fénelon. Leur correspondance. Richelieu et Louis XIII. Lettres inédites
  - Henri-Joseph Molinier for Essai biographique et littéraire sur Octavien de Saint-Gelays, évêque d'Angoulême (1468–1502) et Mellin de Saint-Gelays (1490–1558)
- 1912 :
  - Paul Berret (1861–1943) for Le moyen-âge dans la légende des siècles et les sources de Victor Hugo
  - Albert Chérel (1880–1962) for Explications des maximes des Saints sur la vie intérieure, de Fénelon
  - Philippe Martinon for Les Strophes
  - Charles Oulmont for Pierre Gringore
  - Théodore Rosset for Les origines de la prononciation moderne étudiées au XVIIe siècle
  - Louis Thuasne for Villon et Rabelais
- 1913 :
  - Octave Carion for Méthode nouvelle pour l'étude des homonymes de la langue française
  - Léon Clédat for Dictionnaire étymologique de la langue française
  - Paul Laumonier (1867–1949) for La vie de Pierre de Ronsard, de Claude Binet (1586)
  - Lazare Sainéan for Les sources de l'argot ancien
- 1914 :
  - Antoine Albalat for Comment il faut lire les auteurs classiques français
  - François Gébelin for Correspondance de Montesquieu
  - Maurice Grammont for Le vers français, ses moyens d'expression, son harmonie
  - G. O. d'Harvé for Parlons bien !
  - André Morize (1883–1957) for Correspondance de Montesquieu
  - Hans Sternischa for Deux grammairiens de la fin du XVIIIe siècle (L. Aug. Alemand et Andry de Bois-Regard)
- 1915 :
  - Maxime David (1885–1914)
  - Georges Feuilloy (1883–1915)
  - René Sturel (1885–1914)
  - Léon Vouaux (1870–1914)
- 1917 :
  - Kristoffer Nyrop for Grammaire historique de la langue française
- 1918 :
  - Émile Magne for Lettres inédites de Mme Louise de Gonzague sur la cour de Louis XIV
  - Adolphe van Bever for Les poètes du terroir du XVe au XXe siècle
  - Divna Veković (1886–1944) for Dictionnaire français-serbe et serbe-français
- 1919 :
  - Lucien Foulet (1873–1958) for Le roman de Renard
- 1920 :
  - Paul Laumonier (1867–1949) for Édition des Œuvres de Ronsard
- 1921 :
  - Henri Bauche (1880–1947) for Le langage populaire
  - Paul Berret (1861–1943) for Victor Hugo. La légende des siècles
  - Édouard Bonnaffé for Dictionnaire étymologique et historique des anglicismes
  - Pierre Villey for Les Essais de Michel Montaigne. Les Sources des Essais
- 1922 :
  - Pierre Adam for La langue du duc de Saint-Simon
  - Joseph Anglade for Histoire sommaire de la littérature méridionale au moyen âge (des origines à la fin du XVe siècle)
  - Frédéric Lachèvre for Les œuvres libertines de Cyrano de Bergerac
- 1923 :
  - Sœurs de la Visitation for Œuvres de Saint-François de Sales
  - Joseph Vianey for Victor Hugo : Les Contemplations
- 1924 :
  - Gustave Rudler (1872–1957) for Les techniques de la critique et de l'histoire littéraires en littérature française moderne
  - Louis Thuasne for François Villon. Œuvres

=== From 1925 to 1957 ===
- 1925 :
  - Ferdinand Gohin (1867–1944) for Le compte du rossignol, de A. Gilles Corrozet. Cléopâtre, captive, de Étienne Jodelle
  - Adrien Langlois for Le Style. La Chose et la Matière du XVIIe au XXe siècle
  - Société des textes français modernes
  - Hugues Vaganay (1870–1936) for Publication des Œuvres complètes de Ronsard, textes de 1578
- 1926 :
  - Abbé Joseph Coppin (1885–1978) for Montaigne, traducteur de Raymond Sebon
  - Paul Festugière (1869–1950) for les Œuvres de J.-Fr. Sarasin
  - Pierre Martino for Stendhal-Racine et Shakespeare
  - Daniel Mornet for Édition de la Nouvelle Héloïse, de Jean-Jacques Rousseau
- 1927 :
  - Joseph Calmette for Philippe de Commynes. Mémoires
  - Georges Durville (1853–1943) for Commynes. Mémoires
  - Gabriel Germinet (1882–1969) for Théâtre radiophonique
  - C.-S. Lefèvre for La composition littéraire
- 1928 :
  - Charles Beaulieux for Histoire de l'orthographe française (2 vol.)
- 1929 :
  - J.-Wladimir Bienstock and Curnonsky for Le musée des erreurs ou le Français tel qu'on l'écrit
  - Roger Crétin alias Roger Vercel for Lexique comparé des métaphores dans le théâtre de Corneille et Racine
  - Gaston Guillaumie (1883–1960) for J.-L. Guez de Balzac et la prose française
  - Mgr René Moissenet (1850–1939) for La prononciation du latin
- 1930 :
  - Edmond Faral for La légende arthurienne
- 1931 :
  - Louis Arnould for Poésies de Racan
  - André Boulanger for L'art poétique de Jacques Peletier du Mans
  - Abbé Joseph Coppin (1885–1978) for Les vers de la mort, d'Hélimant moine de Froidmond
  - Albert Dauzat for Histoire de la langue française
  - A. Le Dû for Le rythme dans la prose de Victor Hugo
- 1932 :
  - Louis-Alexandre Bergounioux for Les œuvres poétiques d'Hugues Salel
  - Chanoine Henri Cuvillier for La langue française expliquée
  - Maurice Parturier (1888–1980) for l'Édition des Lettres de Mérimée
- 1933 :
  - Oscar Bloch for Dictionnaire étymologique de la langue française
- 1934 :
  - Armand Garnier for Les tragiques de d'Aubigné
  - Ferdinand Gohin (1867–1944) for Jean de La Fontaine
  - Jean Plattard for les tragiques de d'Aubigné
- 1935 :
  - Georges Mongrédien for Historiettes de Tallemant des Réaux
- 1936 :
  - René Johannet for Édition de Joseph de Maistre
  - Henri Martineau for Édition de Stendhal
  - Jeanne Streicher (18..?-1963) for l'Édition des Remarques sur la langue française, de Vaugelas
- 1938 :
  - Louis Arnould for Édition des Bergeries, de Racan
  - Paul Van Tieghem (1871–1948) for Répertoire des littératures modernes
- 1939 :
  - Gustave Cohen for Œuvres complètes de Ronsard
  - Ferdinand Gohin (1867–1944) for Jean de La Fontaine
  - Jacques Pannier

for Les œuvres de Calvin

- 1940 :
  - Marcel Cressot (1896–1961) for La Phrase et le Vocabulaire dans Huysmans
  - Albert-Marie Schmidt for La Poésie scientifique en France
- 1941 :
  - Raoul Mortier (1881–1951) for La Chanson de Roland, version d'Oxford
- 1942 :
  - Gaston Guillaumie (1883–1960) for Jasmin, Le Théâtre gascon and Florilège des poètes gascons
  - Émile Martin for Un patois lorrain
  - Henri Martineau for Souvenirs d'égotisme
  - Raoul Mortier (1881–1951) for La Chanson de Roland, version de Venise IV
  - Henry Potez for Lettres galantes de Denys Lambin
  - François Préchac (1881–1977) for Lettres galantes de Denys Lambin
- 1943 :
  - Hélène Derréal (1903–1989) for La langue de Saint Pierre Fourier and Le style de Saint Pierre Fourier
  - Raoul Mortier (1881–1951) for Édition de la Chanson de Roland (Tome IV, texte de Paris)
- 1944 :
  - Armand Caraccio (1895–1969) for Promenades dans Rome, de Stendhal
  - Michel François for L'heptaméron de Marguerite de Navarre
  - Jules Mouquet (1878–1949) for Samain, poèmes à la grande amie
  - Maximilien Vox for Correspondance de Napoléon
- 1946 :
  - Arnold van Gennep for Manuel du folklore français
- 1947 :
  - René Bailly (1910–1987) for Dictionnaire des Synonymes
- 1948 :
  - Marcel Cressot (1896–1961) for Le style et ses techniques
  - Léon Delhoume (1887–1965) for Principes de médecine expérimentale, de Claude Bernard
  - Jean Marchand for Le livre de raison, de Montaigne
- 1949 :
  - Robert Baschet for Publication du Journal de Delécluse
  - Yves Le Hir (1919–2005) for Lamennais écrivain
- 1950 :
  - Antoine Bibesco for Lettres de Proust à Bibesco
  - Paul Robert for Dictionnaire. Les mots et les associations d'idées
- 1951 :
  - Patrice Buet (1889–1953) for Poèmes français de poètes étrangers
  - Joseph Canteloube for Anthologie des chants populaires français
  - André Delattre for Voltaire. Correspondance avec les Tronchin
- 1952 :
  - Georges Roth (1887–1975) for Histoire de Mme de Montbrillant, version intégrale des pseudo-mémoires de Mme d'Épinay
- 1953 :
  - Dr Fernand Lotte for Dictionnaire biographique des personnages fictifs de la Comédie humaine
  - Nada Tomiche (1923–2019) for Napoléon écrivain
- 1954 :
  - André Desguine (1902–1981) for Étude des Bacchanales par Ronsard
  - Charles Guérin for Les Odes de Pierre de Ronsard
- 1955 :
  - Jean Babin (1905–1978) for Les parlers de l'Argonne
  - Armand Ziwès for Le jargon de M. François Villon
- 1956 :
  - Marcel Galliot (1899–1989) for Essai sur la Langue de la Réclame
  - Louis de Saint-Pierre for Les Mémoires du maréchal Soult
- 1957 :
  - Adolphe Victor Thomas for Dictionnaire des difficultés de la langue française

=== From 1958 to 1989 ===
- 1958 :
  - Yolande Arsène-Henry for Les plus beaux textes sur le Saint-Esprit
- 1959 :
  - René-Jean Hesbert for Les Conférences ascétiques et Perfection du chef, de Dom Martin et Science et Sainteté, de Dom Jean Mabillon
  - Élisabeth Poulain and Gaston Poulain (1903–1973) for the regional Anthologies of Haut-Languedoc et Armagnac and of Bas-Languedoc et Roussillon
  - Jeanne Streicher (18..?-1963) for Les œuvres poétiques, de Théophile de Viau
- 1960 :
  - Jean Labbé for Correspondance de Francis Jammes
- 1961 :
  - Joseph Barbier (1915–1986) for Le vocabulaire et le style de Péguy
  - Louis Châtelain and Georges Galichet (1904–1992) for Grammaire française expliquée
- 1962 :
  - Helmut Hatzfeld et Yves Le Hir (1919–2005) for Essai de bibliographie critique de stylistique française et romane
  - Henri Morier for Dictionnaire de poétique et de rhétorique
- 1963 :
  - Jacqueline Pinchon (1921–2020) and Robert-Léon Wagner for Grammaire du Français classique et moderne
- 1964 :
  - Pierre Jourda for Édition des Œuvres de Rabelais
- 1965 :
  - Albert-Jean Guibert for Bibliographie des œuvres de Molière publiées au XVIIe siècle
  - Madeleine Horn-Monval for Répertoire bibliographique des Traductions et Adaptations françaises du Théâtre étranger
  - Georges Palassie (Société des Amis de Montaigne) for Mémorial du 1e Congrès International des Études montaignistes
- 1966 :
  - Émile-Jules-François Arnould for La genèse du Barbier de Séville
- 1967 :
  - Albert Doppagne for Trois aspects du français contemporain
  - Henri Perrochon for De Rousseau à Ramuz
  - Samuel Silvestre de Sacy for Édition des Œuvres de Descartes
- 1968 :
  - André Porquet for L'orthographe française
- 1969 :
  - Maurice Delamain for Plaidoyer pour les mots
  - Maurice Joseph-Gabriel for La Dissertation pédagogique
- 1970 :
  - Nina Catach for L'orthographe française à l'époque de la Renaissance
  - Fernand Criqui (1921–2006) for Mots et Concepts - Lexique permanent
- 1971 :
  - Robert Beauvais for L'Hexagonal tel qu'on le parle
  - Fernand Duplouy and René Galichet for Méthode active d'initiation à la composition française
  - Robert Le Bidois for Les mots trompeurs
- 1973 :
  - Roger Guichemerre (1924–2018) for La comédie avant Molière
  - Mme Claude Labarraque Reyssac for En marge de Molière. La jeunesse de Philaminte
  - Georges Martin for Nîmes dans la littérature
  - Guy Turbet-Delof (1922–2008) for L'Afrique barbaresque dans la littérature aux XVIe et XVIIe siècles
- 1975 :
  - Hélène Bourgeois-Gielen, Albert Doppagne and Joseph Hanse for Nouvelle chasse aux Belgicismes
- 1976 :
  - Henri Bénac and Jean-Yves Dournon for Dictionnaire d'orthographe et des difficultés du français
- 1977 :
  - Henri Bénac and Édouard Bled for Guide pratique d'orthographe
- 1978 :
  - Claude Désirat, Émile Genouvrier and Tristan Hordé (1932-....) for Nouveau Dictionnaire des Synonymes
- 1979 :
  - Jean-Pol Caput (1937–2001) for L'Académie française et la pureté de la langue française entre 1859 et 1935 (L'orthographe et la prononciation)
  - Adelin Moulis for Le dictionnaire languedocien-français
  - René Nelli for Mais enfin qu'est-ce que l'Occitanie ?
  - Jean H. Zemb for Comparaison de Deux Systèmes
- 1980 :
  - Maurice Maloux for Dictionnaire des proverbes, sentences et maximes
  - André Porquet (1916-....) for L'orthographe sans peine
- 1983 :
  - Henri Bertaud du Chazaud for Dictionnaire des synonymes
  - Jean-Yves Dournon for Le grand dictionnaire des citations françaises
- 1984 :
  - Louis-Marie Morfaux (19..-1998) for Vocabulaire de la philosophie et des sciences humaines
- 1985 :
  - Roger Morvan for Le petit Retz-Morvan
  - Henri de Vaulchier for Charles Nodier et la lexicographie française 1808-1844
- 1986 :
  - Georges Matoré for Le vocabulaire et la société médiévale
- 1987 :
  - Jean-Yves Dournon for Le dictionnaire des proverbes et dictons de France
- 1988 :
  - Gérard Cornu for Vocabulaire juridique
- 1989 :
  - Loïc Depecker for Les Mots de la francophonie

== Laureates from the Académie des inscriptions et belles-lettres ==
=== From 1901 to 1950 ===
- 1901:
  - Georges Louis Rodier for his translation of Traité de l'âme, d'Aristote.
  - Philippe-Ernest Legrand for his study on Theocritus.
  - Alcide Macé (1862-19..) for his essay on Suetonius.
- 1902:
  - Charles Diehl for Justinien et la civilisation byzantine au vie siècle.
  - Fernand de Mély for Les Reliques de Constantinople au XIIIe siècle et l'ensemble de ses travaux archéologiques.
- 1903:
  - Charles Fossey for La Magie assyrienne.
  - Joanny Grosset for the translation of Bharatya-Natya-Castram.
  - Alexandre Moret for Le rituel du culte divin journalier en Égypte.
  - Paul Toscanne (1867–1919) for Les Cylindres de Gudéa.

== Laureates from the Academie des sciences morales et politiques ==
- 1978 : Annuaire de l'Afrique du Nord
- 2000 : Michel Espagne for Les transferts culturels franco-allemands, Paris (PUF), 2000. (Ethics et sociology)
- 2002 : Raoul Béteille for De l'injustice, Paris (François-Xavier de Guibert), 2001. (Legislation, public law and jurisprudence)
- 2004 : Jean-Pierre Boisivon for all of his work. (Political Economy, statistics et finances)
- 2006 : Michèle Cointet for De Gaulle et Giraud. L'affrontement, Paris (Perrin), 2006. (History et Geography)
- 2008 : Jean Garrigues for the direction of Histoire du Parlement de 1789 à nos jours et Grands discours parlementaires (de la Révolution à la Ve République), Paris (Armand Colin), 6 volumes, 2004-2008. (General)
- 2010 : Marie Pérouse for L'invention des Pensées de Pascal. Les éditions de Port-Royal (1670–1678), Paris (Honoré Champion), 2009. (Philosophy)
- 2012 : Élisabeth Dufourcq for L'invention de la loi naturelle, Paris, Bayard, 2012. (Ethics and sociology)
- 2014 : Christophe Bigot for his work Pratique du droit de la presse. Presse écrite – Audiovisuel – Internet, Paris (Victoires Éditions), 2013. (Legislation, public law and jurisprudence)
- 2016 : Bertrand Martinot and Franck Morel for their work Un autre droit du travail est possible, Paris, (Fayard), 2016. (Political Economy, statistics et finances)
