= No. 142 Squadron RAF =

Defunct flying squadron of the Royal Air Force

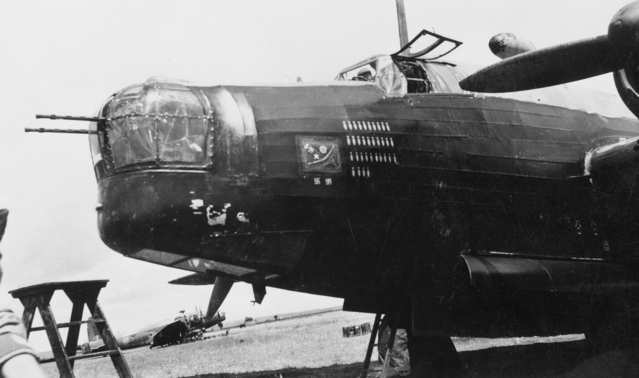
- Wellington Mark X bomber of the No. 142 Squadron in Italy, c. 1944
- Active: 2 Feb 1918 – 1 Feb 1920; 1 Jun 1934 – 5 Oct 1944; 25 Oct 1944 – 28 Sep 1945; 1 Feb 1959 – 1 Apr 1959; 22 Jul 1959 – 24 May 1963
- Country: United Kingdom
- Branch: Royal Air Force
- Motto: "Determination"
- Equipment: B.E.12; Martinsyde Elephant; R.E.8; B.E.2; Armstrong-Whitworth F.K.8; Hawker Hart; Hawker Hind; Fairey Battle; Vickers Wellington de Havilland Mosquito de Havilland Venom de Havilland Vampire Trainer; Douglas PGM-17 Thor

Insignia
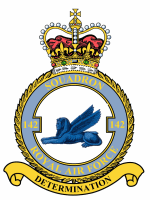
- Squadron badge (Note: A winged sphinx. The badge commemorates the squadron's association with Egypt.)
- Squadron codes: KB April - Sep 1939; QT Sep 1939 - Oct 1944; 4H Oct 1944 - Sep 1945

No. 142 Squadron was a flying squadron of the Royal Air Force (RAF). It was formed at RFC Ismailia in Egypt during the First World War. Disbanded in 1920, then re-formed in 1934, 142 Squadron in France, then over occupied Western Europe. In 1942, it was transferred to North Africa where it took part in the North African and Italian campaigns. After the war, it was transformed into a Strategic Missile being eventually disbanded in 1963.

== History ==
No. 142 Squadron of the Royal Flying Corps (RFC) was formed at RFC Ismailia, Egypt in 1918, flying a mixed bag of reconnaissance and bomber aircraft. On the formation of the Royal Air Force, on 1 April 1918, 142 Squadron was at RFC Julis in Palestine, becoming No. 142 Squadron RAF. After operations in Palestine the squadron retired to RAF Suez where it disbanded on 1 February 1920, to form No. 55 Squadron RAF.

== World War II ==
Re-formed at RAF Netheravon on 1 June 1934, 142 Squadron was equipped with the Fairey Battle light bomber when hostilities opened in 1939. The squadron deployed to France as part of the RAF Advanced Air Striking Force, which supported the British Expeditionary Force (BEF). Battle squadrons suffered heavy casualties after the German invasion of France in May-June 1940. After returning to Britain, the squadron was rebuilt, and in November 1940 began converting to the Vickers Wellington heavy bomber.

After flying night bombing missions over Germany and occupied western Europe, the squadron transferred to North Africa in December 1942. The squadron took part in the North African and Italian campaigns. On 5 October 1944, 142 Squadron was disbanded at Regine in Italy to allow the squadron to re-form at RAF Gransden Lodge flying de Havilland Mosquito bombers as part of No. 8 (PFF) Group's Light Night Striking Force. Soon after World War II ended the squadron was disbanded while still located at RAF Gransden Lodge.

== Post war era ==
A brief period of existence occurred between 1 February 1959 and 1 April 1959 at RAF Eastleigh in Kenya, where the squadron flew de Havilland Venom FB.4s and de Havilland Vampire trainers, before re-forming as No. 208 Squadron RAF.

The latest incarnation of 142 Squadron occurred on 22 July 1959 at RAF Coleby Grange as one of 20 Strategic Missile (SM) squadrons associated with Project Emily, equipped with three US Douglas Thor intermediate range ballistic missiles (IRBM). 142 The Thor missiles would be armed with W49 thermonuclear warheads, each with an explosive yield of 1.44 megatons. The warheads remained under the control of the United States Air Force (USAF) under the "Dual Key" arrangement, whereby launch of a live missile would require authority from both the United Kingdom and US governments. RAF Coleby Grange was the base one of five squadrons, each armed with three missiles, based in Lincolnshire, with the headquarters at RAF Hemswell and a squadron each at RAF Bardney, RAF Caistor and RAF Ludford Magna.

During October 1962 142 Squadron was kept at full readiness, with the missiles aimed at strategic targets in the USSR, as part of the threatened response to the Cuban Missile Crisis. At the conclusion of the crisis, de-activation of the Thor missiles in the UK were offered up as part of the negotiations, along with the Jupiter medium range missiles in Turkey. The Thor missile squadrons were stood down in 1963, with 142 Squadron disbanding on 24 May 1963.

== Operational airfields ==
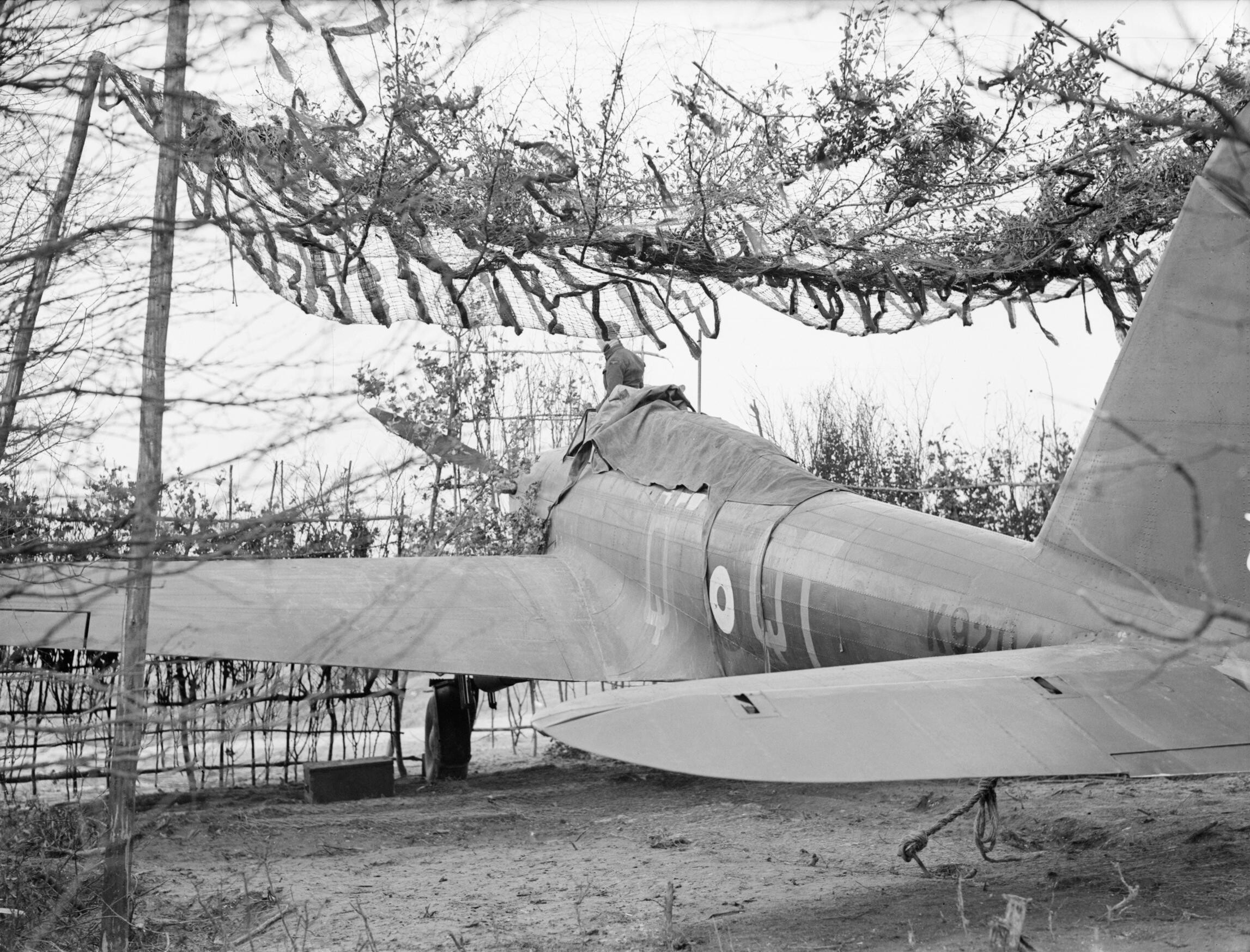
A Fairey Battle light bomber of No. 142 Squadron at the airfield at Berry-au-Bac, in the period 1939–1940

- Ismailia, Egypt
- Julis, Palestine
- Suez, Egypt
- RAF Netheravon
- RAF Andover 3 Dec 1936 – 9 May 1939
- RAF Bicester 9 May −2 Sep 1939
- Berry-au-Bac (France) 2 – 12 Sep 1939
- Plivot 12 Sep – 16 May 1940
- Faux-Villecerf 16 May – 6 Jun 1940
- Villiers-Faux 6 – 15 Jun 1940
- RAF Waddington 15 Jun 1940 – 3 Jul 1940
- RAF Binbrook 3 Jul 1940 – 12 Aug 1940; 6 Sep 1940 – 26 Nov 1941
- RAF Eastchurch 12 Aug 1940 – 6 Sep 1940
- RAF Waltham & RAF Kirmington 26 Nov 1941 – Dec 1942
- RAF Thruxton 7 Jun-7 Jul 1942
- Blida 19 Dec 1942 – 5 May 1943
- Fontaine Chaude 5–26 May 1943
- Kairouan 26 May – 15 Nov 1943
- Oudna 15 Nov – 16 Dec 1943
- Cerignola 16 Dec 1943 – 14 Feb 1944
- Amendola 14 Feb – 3 Jul 1944
- Regine 3 Jul – 5 Oct 1944
- RAF Gransden Lodge 25 Oct 1944 – 28 Sep 1945
- RAF Eastleigh 1 Feb 1959 – 1 Apr 1959
- RAF Coleby Grange 22 Jul 1959 – 24 May 1963

== Memorial on Ashdown Forest ==
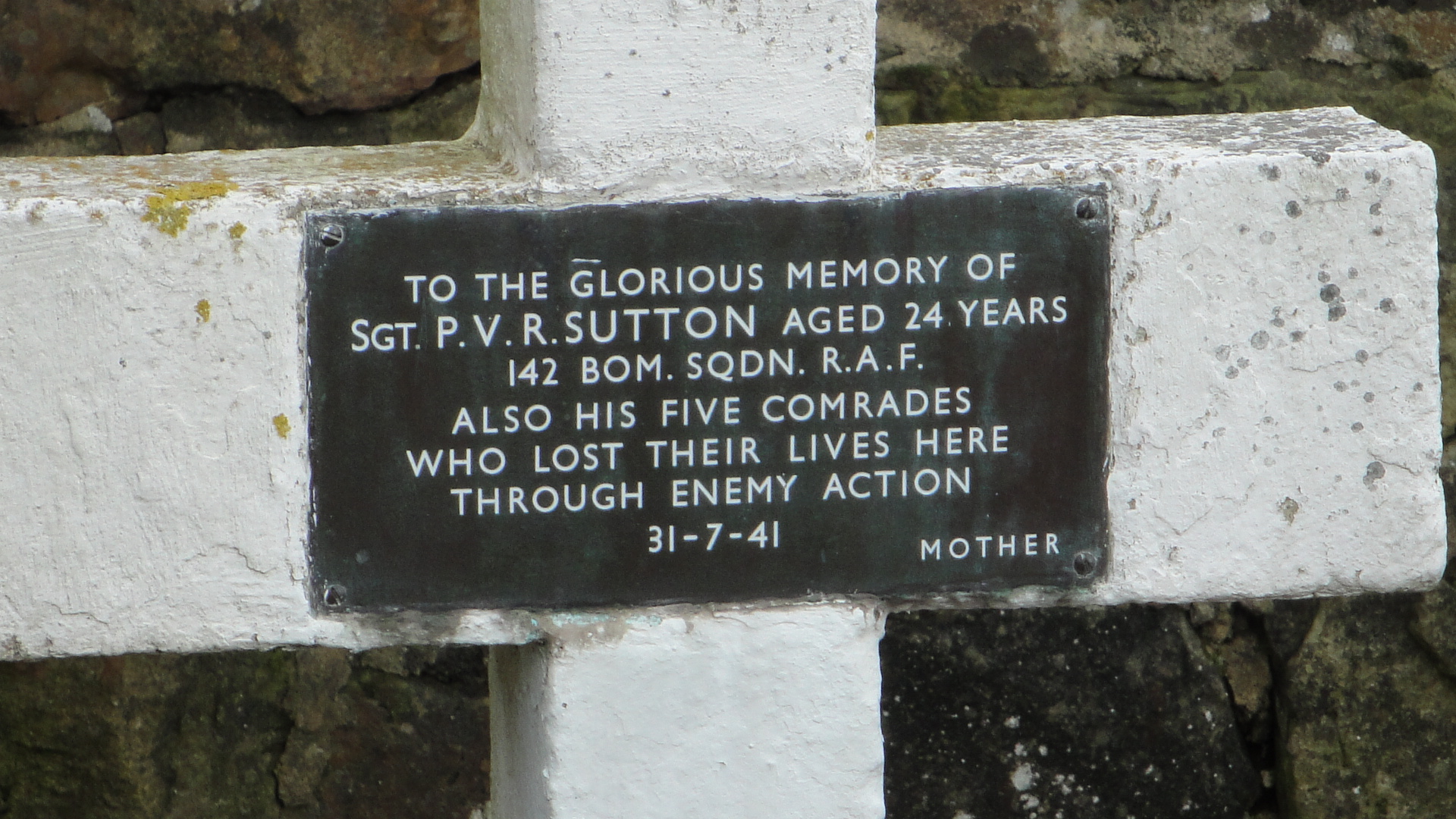
The Airman's Grave at Ashdown Forest commemorates the six man crew of a Wellington bomber of 142 Squadron

The 'Airman's Grave' on Ashdown Forest in East Sussex is, despite its name, not a grave but a memorial to the six man crew of a Wellington bomber of 142 Squadron who were killed when it crashed on the southern slopes of the forest on the morning of 31 July 1941 as it returned from a raid on Cologne during World War II. The memorial, which is a simple stone-walled enclosure on the heathland between Nutley and Duddleswell, shelters a white cross surrounded by a tiny garden of remembrance. The memorial began with a wooden cross erected at the crash site by the mother of Sergeant Victor Ronald Sutton, the second pilot, who was aged 24 at the time of his death. A short public ceremony takes place each year on Remembrance Sunday when a wreath is laid by an Ashdown Forest Ranger, at the request of Mrs Sutton, together with ones on behalf of the Conservators of Ashdown Forest, the Ashdown Forest Foundation, the Society of the Friends of Ashdown Forest, the Ashdown Forest Riding Association and a variety of local groups. The Ashdown Forest Centre has published a circular walk to the memorial from Hollies car park.

== Bibliography ==
- Lake, Alan. "Flying Units of the RAF". Airlife Publishing. Shrewsbury. 1999. ISBN 1-84037-086-6
- Halley, James J. The Squadrons of the Royal Air Force & Commonwealth 1918–1988. Tonbridge, Kent, UK: Air Britain (Historians) Ltd., 1988. ISBN 0-85130-164-9.
- Jefford, C.G. RAF Squadrons, a Comprehensive record of the Movement and Equipment of all RAF Squadrons and their Antecedents since 1912. Shropshire, UK: Airlife Publishing, 1988 (second edition 2001). ISBN 1-85310-053-6.
