= Henri Morier =

Swiss literary scholar (1910–2004)

Henri Morier (23 May 1910 – 20 December 2004) was a Swiss literary scholar.

== Life ==
Born in Geneva, he was a professor of French at the University of Geneva. He specialised in French-language poetry and rhetoric.

Among his books are Le rythme du vers libre symboliste, recipient of the 1946 Prix Bordin, and La psychologie des styles, recipient of the 1959 Prix de la langue française from the Académie Française.

He wrote the Dictionnaire de poétique et de rhétorique, which first was published in 1961 and appeared in several revised and expanded editions. The book received the 1962 Prix Saintour.
