= Patrick Pendanx =

French footballer (born 1975)

Personal information
- Full name: Patrick Pendanx
- Date of birth: 16 May 1975 (age 51)
- Place of birth: Dax, France
- Height: 1.73 m (5 ft 8 in)
- Position: Midfielder

Team information
- Current team: Stade Montois

Senior career*
Years	Team	Apps	(Gls)
1995–1997	Chamois Niortais	7	(0)
1997–	Stade Montois	190	(58)
- * Club domestic league appearances and goals

Patrick Pendanx (born 16 May 1975) is a footballer currently playing for Championnat de France amateur 2 side Stade Montois as a midfielder. In the 1996–97 season, Pendanx played seven Ligue 2 games for Chamois Niortais.

== See also ==
- Football in France
- List of football clubs in France
