= Dax, Landes =

Dax Dacs (Occitan)
- Subprefecture and commune
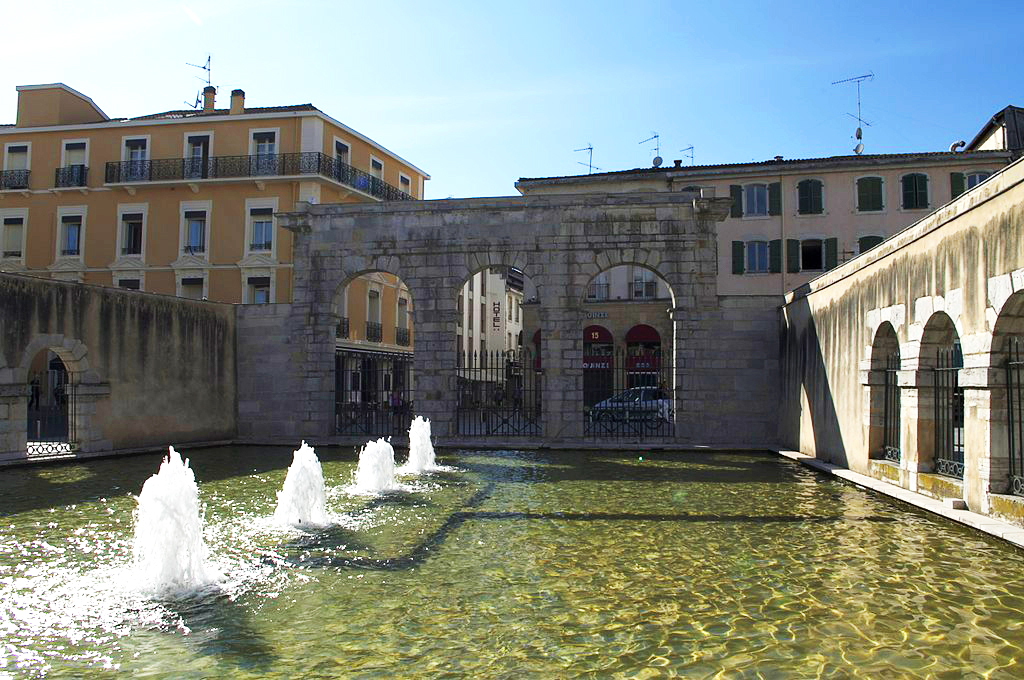
- La Fontaine Chaude

- Coat of arms
- Location of Dax
- Location within France Location within Nouvelle-Aquitaine
- Coordinates: 43°43′N 1°03′W
- Country: France
- Region: Nouvelle-Aquitaine
- Department: Landes
- Arrondissement: Dax
- Canton: Dax-1 and 2
- Intercommunality: CA Grand Dax

Government
  - Mayor (2020–2026): Julien Dubois
- Area^{1}: 19.70 km^{2} (7.61 sq mi)
- Elevation: 9 m (30 ft)
- Highest elevation: 46 m (151 ft)
- Lowest elevation: 2 m (6.6 ft)
- Population (2023): 22,109
  - Density: 1,122/km^{2} (2,907/sq mi)
- Time zone: UTC+01:00 (CET)
  - Summer (DST): UTC+02:00 (CEST)
- INSEE/Postal code: 40088 /40100
- ^{1} French Land Register data, which excludes lakes, ponds, glaciers > 1 km^{2} (0.386 sq mi or 247 acres) and river estuaries.

Dax (French pronunciation: [daks]; Occitan: Dacs; Basque: Akize) is a commune in Nouvelle-Aquitaine, southwestern France, sub-prefecture of the Landes department.

It is known as a spa destination, specialising in mud treatment for rheumatism and similar ailments. Dax is also known for its bullfighting culture, especially during the August ferias, one of the most crowded festival events in France with 800,000 people attending over five days. It is also a market town, former bishopric and busy local centre, especially for the Chalosse area.

== Geography ==
Dax lies on the river Adour, 30 km (19 mi) from the Atlantic Ocean and 42 km (26 mi) northwest of Bayonne. Dax station has rail connections to Paris, Hendaye, Tarbes, Bordeaux, Bayonne and Pau.

== History ==
It was established by the Romans, and its reputation is supposed to date from a visit by Julia, the daughter of the first Emperor Octavian Augustus. Its Roman name was Civitas Aquensium. In the Middle Ages, it was administered by viscounts until 1177. From the acquisition of Aquitaine in 1152 by Henry II Plantagenet, later King of England, Dax remained under English rule until 1451, when it was conquered by French troops before the end of the Hundred Years' War. It successfully withstood a Spanish siege in 1521–1522.

The Hôtel de Ville was completed around 1790.

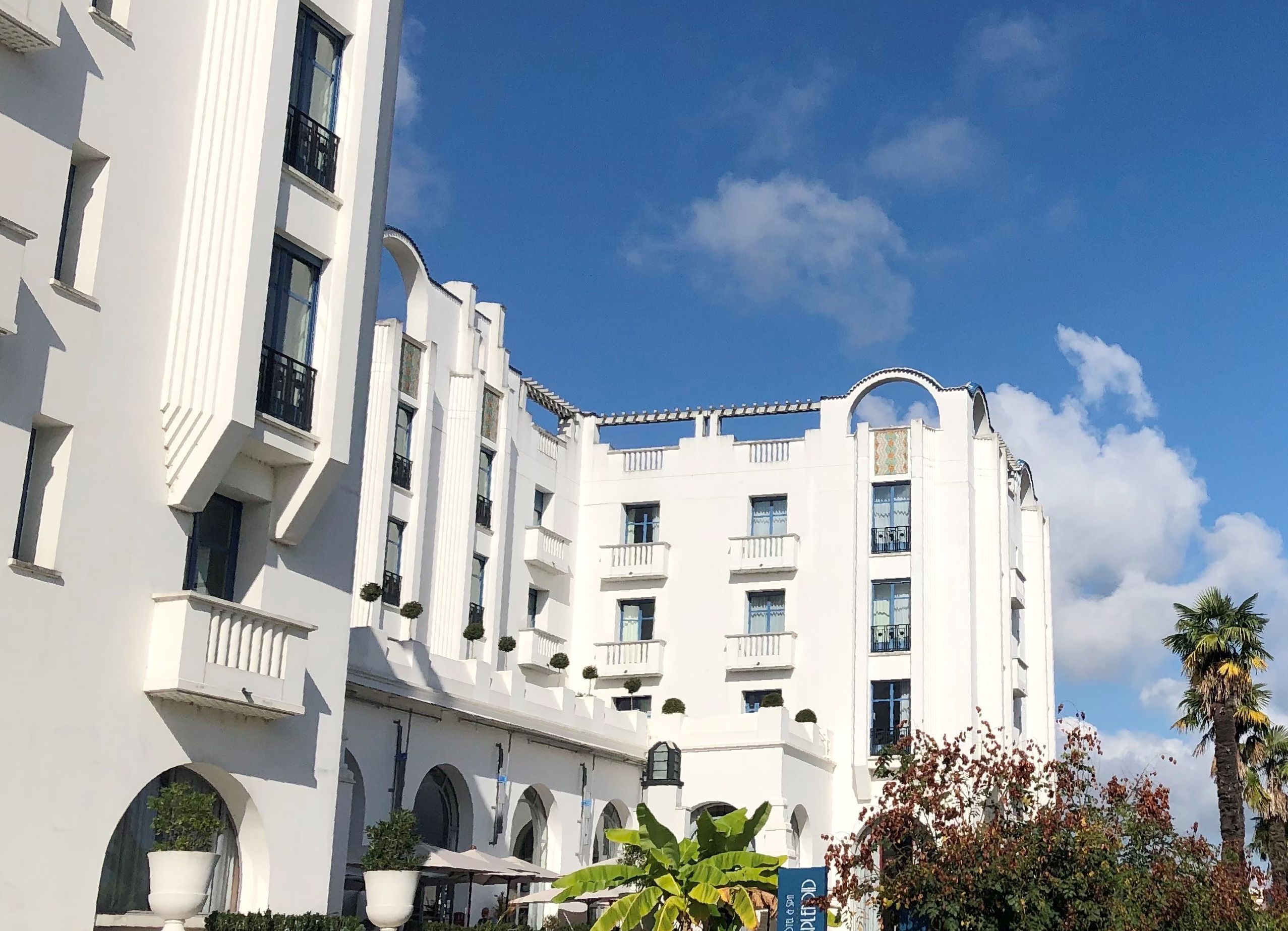
Splendid Hotel, 1928

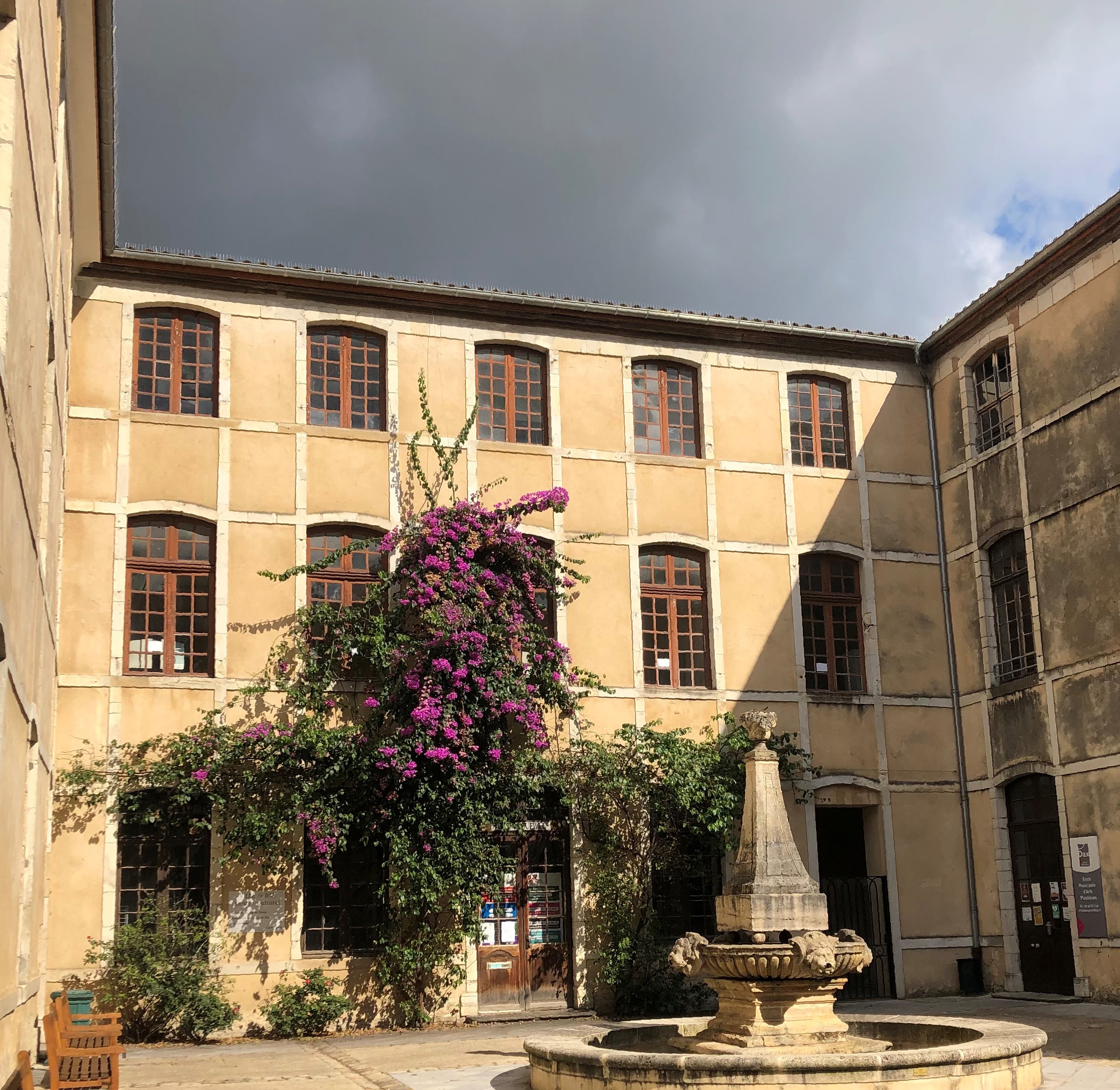
Neurisse Hotel, XVII^{th} century.

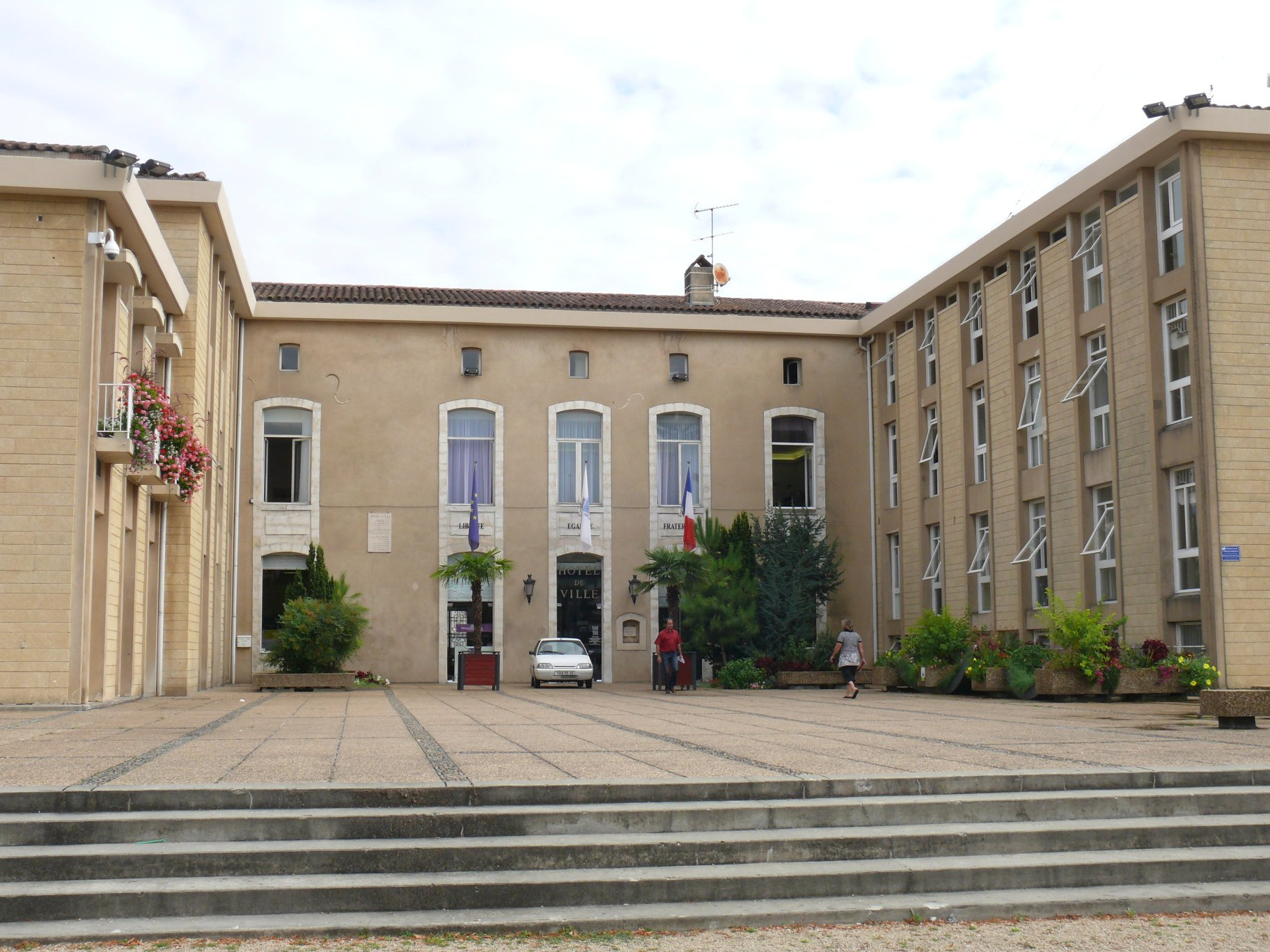
The Hôtel de Ville

== Population ==
Historical population

Year	Pop.	±% p.a.
1793	3,391	—
1800	3,398	+0.03%
1806	3,179	−1.10%
1821	4,948	+2.99%
1831	4,716	−0.48%
1836	4,776	+0.25%
1841	5,842	+4.11%
1846	5,615	−0.79%
1851	5,805	+0.67%
1856	6,125	+1.08%
1861	9,856	+9.98%
1866	9,469	−0.80%
1872	9,062	−0.73%
1876	10,250	+3.13%
1881	10,218	−0.06%
1886	10,858	+1.22%
1891	10,240	−1.17%
1896	10,196	−0.09%
1901	10,329	+0.26%

Year	Pop.	±% p.a.
1906	11,210	+1.65%
1911	11,387	+0.31%
1921	11,047	−0.30%
1926	12,385	+2.31%
1931	12,663	+0.44%
1936	13,056	+0.61%
1946	14,113	+0.78%
1954	14,557	+0.39%
1962	17,051	+2.00%
1968	19,348	+2.13%
1975	19,137	−0.16%
1982	18,648	−0.37%
1990	19,309	+0.44%
1999	19,515	+0.12%
2007	20,860	+0.84%
2012	20,364	−0.48%
2017	20,681	+0.31%
2023	22,109	+1.12%

Source: EHESS and INSEE (1968-2023)

== Climate ==
Climate data for Dax (1991–2020 normals, extremes 1958–present)
Month	Jan	Feb	Mar	Apr	May	Jun	Jul	Aug	Sep	Oct	Nov	Dec	Year
Record high °C (°F)	24.0 (75.2)	27.2 (81.0)	30.1 (86.2)	32.7 (90.9)	36.2 (97.2)	42.1 (107.8)	40.8 (105.4)	41.1 (106.0)	39.0 (102.2)	34.7 (94.5)	28.1 (82.6)	23.9 (75.0)	42.1 (107.8)
Mean daily maximum °C (°F)	11.7 (53.1)	13.2 (55.8)	16.6 (61.9)	18.6 (65.5)	21.9 (71.4)	24.9 (76.8)	26.9 (80.4)	27.5 (81.5)	24.9 (76.8)	20.8 (69.4)	15.0 (59.0)	12.0 (53.6)	19.5 (67.1)
Daily mean °C (°F)	7.5 (45.5)	8.3 (46.9)	11.2 (52.2)	13.3 (55.9)	16.7 (62.1)	19.8 (67.6)	21.6 (70.9)	21.9 (71.4)	19.2 (66.6)	15.6 (60.1)	10.7 (51.3)	8.0 (46.4)	14.5 (58.1)
Mean daily minimum °C (°F)	3.3 (37.9)	3.3 (37.9)	5.8 (42.4)	8.0 (46.4)	11.4 (52.5)	14.6 (58.3)	16.4 (61.5)	16.4 (61.5)	13.4 (56.1)	10.5 (50.9)	6.4 (43.5)	4.0 (39.2)	9.5 (49.1)
Record low °C (°F)	−16.2 (2.8)	−9.5 (14.9)	−8.3 (17.1)	−2.8 (27.0)	0.3 (32.5)	3.8 (38.8)	3.4 (38.1)	6.8 (44.2)	2.2 (36.0)	−1.7 (28.9)	−7.2 (19.0)	−10.2 (13.6)	−16.2 (2.8)
Average precipitation mm (inches)	112.6 (4.43)	89.7 (3.53)	85.6 (3.37)	103.9 (4.09)	92.7 (3.65)	73.7 (2.90)	62.7 (2.47)	63.3 (2.49)	88.9 (3.50)	108.3 (4.26)	156.6 (6.17)	117.2 (4.61)	1,155.2 (45.48)
Average precipitation days (≥ 1.0 mm)	12.5	10.4	10.6	12.7	11.6	8.5	7.8	8.1	8.9	10.8	13.4	12.1	127.4
Average relative humidity (%)	87	82	78	79	79	79	78	81	82	87	88	89	82.4
Mean monthly sunshine hours	90.3	111.7	163.2	172.5	199.0	207.6	226.3	221.6	197.3	145.3	94.7	84.2	1,913.7
Source 1: Meteociel
Source 2: Infoclimat.fr (humidity, 1961–1990)

== Sights ==
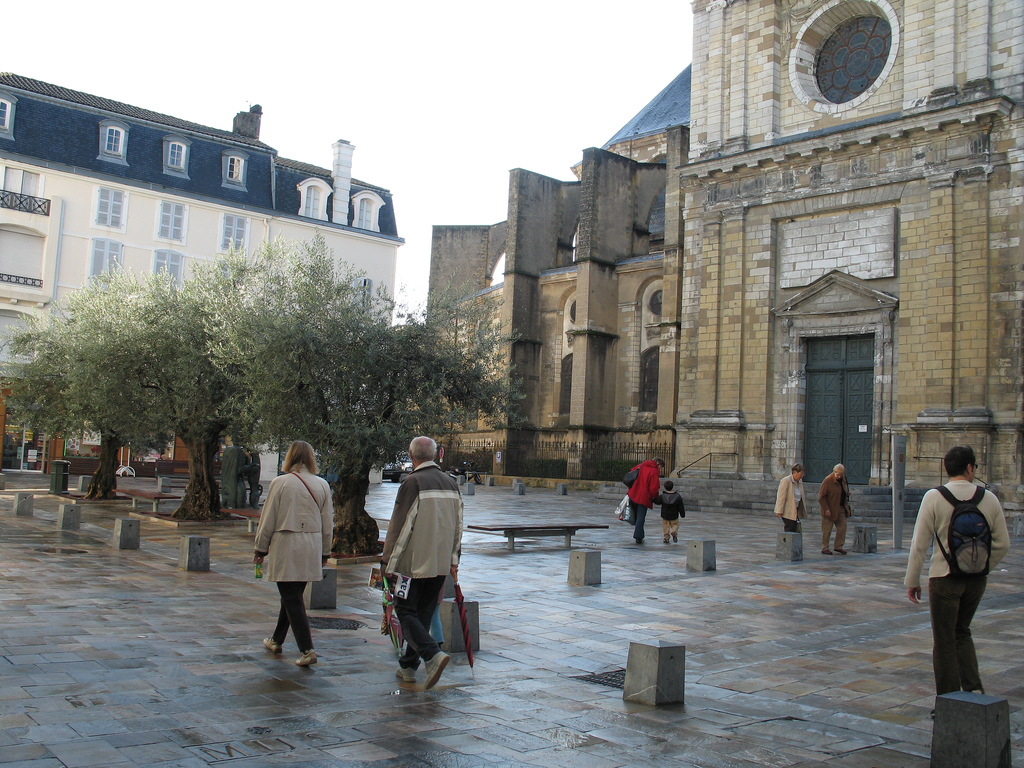
Place de la cathédrale.

- Roman archaeological crypt, including the foundations of a Roman temple from the second century AD
- Remains of the Gallic-Roman walls (4th century)
- Cathedral of Notre-Dame Ste-Marie
- Church of Saint-Vincent-de-Xaintes
- Fontaine Chaude ("Hot Fountain")
- Château de Dax, former castle where Hôtel Splendid now is

== Sports ==
The US Dax rugby club founded in 1904 is an important historical team, as many other town in south west of France. Many famous French rugby players comes from Dax and its suburbs such as Pierre Albaladejo, Raphaël Ibanez, or Richard Dourthe.

== Twin towns ==
- Logroño, Spain

== Personalities ==
- Maurice Boyau, ace of the First World War who spent most of his life in Dax
- Jean-Charles de Borda, mathematician
- Vincent de Paul, theologian born in a village near Dax
- Victor Denain, aviator and politician
- Roger Ducos, politician born in Dax
- Patrick Edlinger, rock climber
- Brigitte Lovisa Fouché, painter
- Laurent Fressinet, chess player
- Raphaël Ibañez, rugby player
- Christophe Lamaison, rugby player
- Émile Magne (1877–1953), art historian and literary critic
- Patrick Pendanx (1975-), footballer

== See also ==
- Diocese of Dax
- Guiraude de Dax
- US Dax, a French rugby union club based in Dax.
- Dacquoise
