= Château de Dax =

Former French castle

Coordinates: 43.71°N 1.05°W

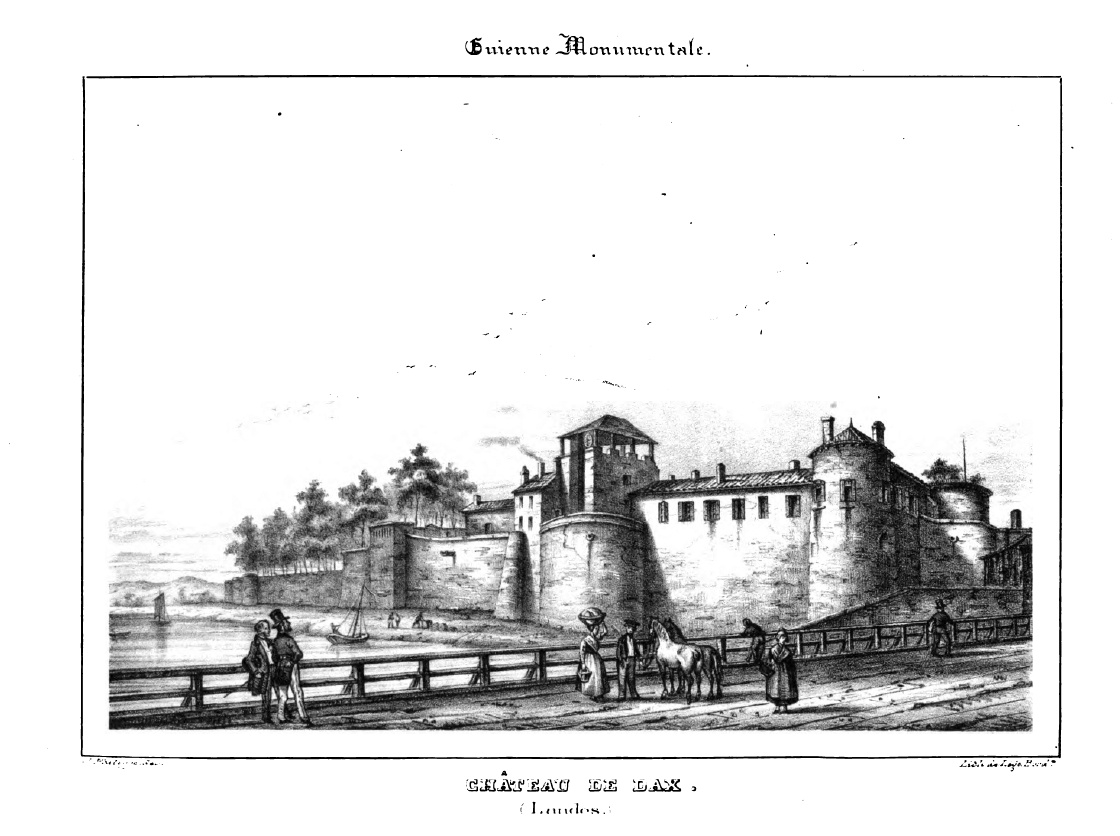
Château de Dax, as drawn in 1842.

Château de Dax was a castle in Dax, Nouvelle-Aquitaine in southwestern France.

== History ==
The castle was once the home of Viscounts of Dax. The castle was captured by the French in 1442 and also in 1451 during the Gascon campaign of 1450-1453 to expel the English from the Duchy of Gascony. Decommissioned as a military barracks in 1888, the castle was demolished in 1891.

The Hôtel Splendid now stands on the site.
