= Hôtel de Ville, Dax =

Town hall in Dax, France

Hôtel de Ville
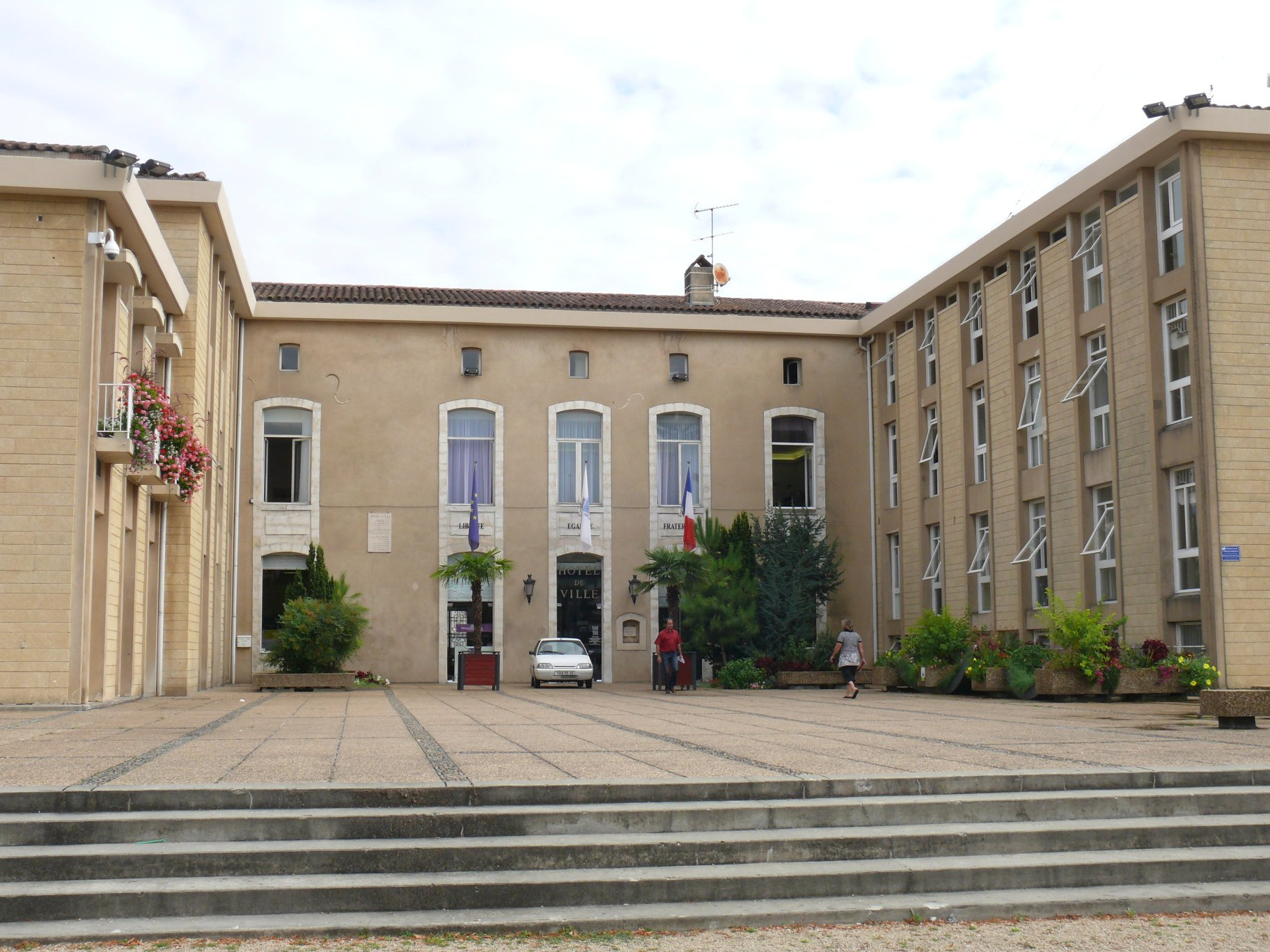
- The main frontage of the Hôtel de Ville in August 2012
- Interactive map of the Hôtel de Ville area

General information
- Type: City hall
- Architectural style: Neoclassical style
- Location: Dax, France
- Coordinates: 43.7086°N 1.0518°W
- Completed: c.1790

The Hôtel de Ville (French pronunciation: [otɛl də vil], City Hall) is a municipal building in Dax, Landes, in southwestern France, standing on Rue Saint-Pierre.

== History ==
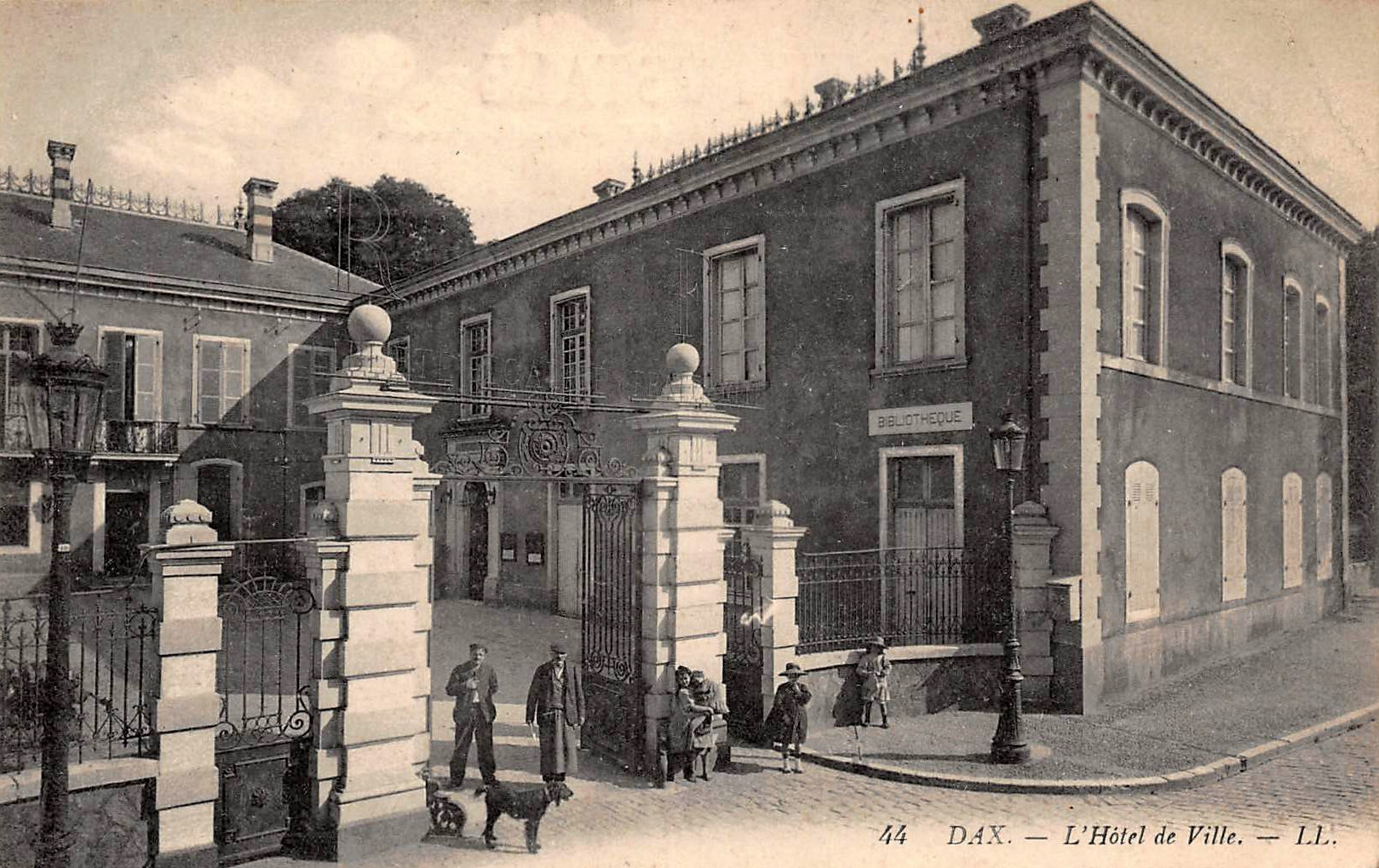
Hôtel Darricau

An early town hall was erected on the east side of Rue des Fusillés in the 12th century. The building consisted of a main hall and a square bell tower with a large bell. Most of municipal archives were lost in a major fire when the bell tower was struck by lightning on 12 June 1631. The town hall was subsequently rebuilt on the same site but, after becoming dilapidated in the late 18th century, it was abandoned and subsequently demolished.

After the French Revolution, the new town council established itself in the Couvent des Cordeliers (Covent of the Cordeliers) at the east end of what is now Esplanade du Général de Gaulle. The convent had been established by order of Henry III in the 13th century. It consisted of a main hall and a tall bell tower, which was 100 feet (30 m) high. Once the monks had been driven out, the building was seized by the state and handed over to the council in 1790. After the building was no longer required for municipal use, it was demolished and a prison was erected on the site.

The council then relocated to the Couvent et Collège des Barnabites (Convent and College of the Barnabites) on the north side of Rue des Barnabites in 1806. The convent had been established in the mid-16th century. It consisted of a chapel and some apartments in which the monks lived and studied. Once the monks had been driven out, the building was seized by the state and handed over to the council in 1806. After the building was no longer required for municipal use, it was also demolished and a courthouse was erected on the site.

The council next moved to the Hôtel Darricau on the east side of the Cathedral of Notre-Dame in 1822. The building had been commissioned as an episcopal palace in the mid-16th century. It was a typical hôtel particulier with a grand gate, a grand courtyard and two ornate façades. After the French Revolution, it was acquired by General Augustin Darricau. The council acquired the building from his widow. After the building was no longer required for municipal use, it was also demolished and the site now forms part of Square Max Moras.

In 1934, following significant population growth, the council led by the mayor, Eugène Milliès-Lacroix, decided to acquire more substantial premises. The building they selected was the Hôtel de Chièvres on the south side of Rue Saint-Pierre. It was also a typical hôtel particulier with a grand gate, a grand courtyard and two ornate façades. The building was commissioned by a tax collector, Pierre Planter, in the late 18th century. It was designed in the neoclassical style, built in brick with a cement render finish and was completed in around 1790. The building passed down the Planter family to Thérèse Emmanuelle de Chièvres (née Devert) and then became known as Hôtel de Chièvres. Although the council acquired the building through compulsory purchase in the 1930s, the compensation was not settled until the 1960s. The building was extended in the early 1970s to a design by René Guichemerre and the enlarged complex was re-opened by the minister for regional planning, Olivier Guichard, on 20 August 1973. Internally, the principal room was the Salle du Conseil (council chamber).

A war memorial, in the former of a fluted column surmounted by a statue, intended to commemorate the lives of local people who had died in the First World War, which had originally been installed in Place Borda (now Place Thiers), was subsequently relocated to Square Max Moras, behind the town hall.
