= Léon Vouaux =

French priest, philologist and lichenologist

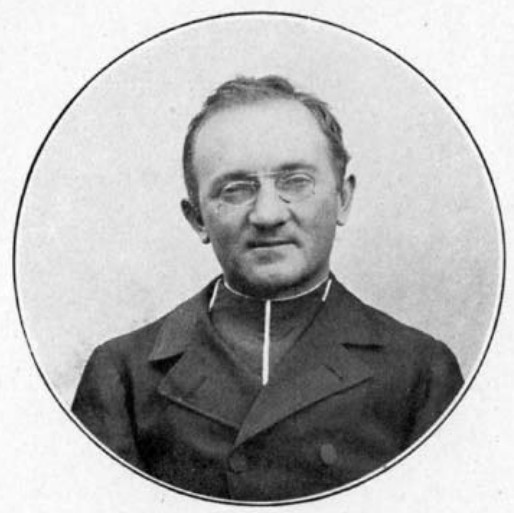
- Léon Vouaux in 1901
- Born: February 25, 1870; Baccarat, Meurthe-et-Moselle
- Died: August 26, 1914 (aged 44); Jarny
- Scientific career
- Fields: Lichenology, mycology, philology
- Author abbrev. (botany): Vouaux

Léon Vouaux (1870 – 1914) was a French priest, philologist and lichenologist. He was executed by German forces in the second month of the First World War. The Académie Française awarded him the Prix Saintour posthumously in 1915.

== Early life and education ==
Vouaux was born 25 February 1870 in Baccarat, Meurthe-et-Moselle in Lorraine, France. He studied at seminaries in Pont-à-Mousson and Nancy and was ordained a priest in 1893. He then attended the University of Nancy from 1894 until 1898. Vouaux was awarded an Arts degree (license dès-lettres) in 1895 and in 1898 he passed the grammar aggregation competition (l'agrégation de grammaire) as a prelude to appointment to an academic post.

== Career ==
He was appointed to the staff of the ecclesiastical college of Malgrange, near Nancy, where he taught literature and mathematics until his death. He was promoted to be a first grade teacher (professeur de première). He wrote in Greek and Latin and was able to translate texts from these languages into French. From around 1912 he wrote a series of books about The Apocrypha of the New Testament. The first was published in 1913. This was The Acts of Paul and his Apocryphal Letters (Les actes de Paul et ses lettres apocryphes). The second, The Acts of Peter (Les actes de Pierre), was unpublished at Vouaux's death but published in 1922. He was awarded the annual literary Prix Saintour posthumously by the Académie Française in November 1915 for his book about St. Paul.

Vouaux was interested in natural history and particularly knowledgeable about fungi and insects. He was influenced to focus on lichens by two other member of staff at the college, Harmand and Le Monnier. He joined the Mycological Society of France in 1903. He corresponded with other mycologists in France and abroad. He was active in describing lichens from 1909 and his accounts began to be published in the Bulletin of the Mycological Society of France from 1912. He had completed seven booklets by 1914, under the title Synopsis of the Parasitic Fungi of Lichens (Synopsis des Champignons parasites des Lichens). These provided careful and critical descriptions, including 36 new species of lichen, but he also began to write about the lifestyle of lichens, discussing the concepts of parasitism, symbiosis and saptrophism in their context.

== Death ==
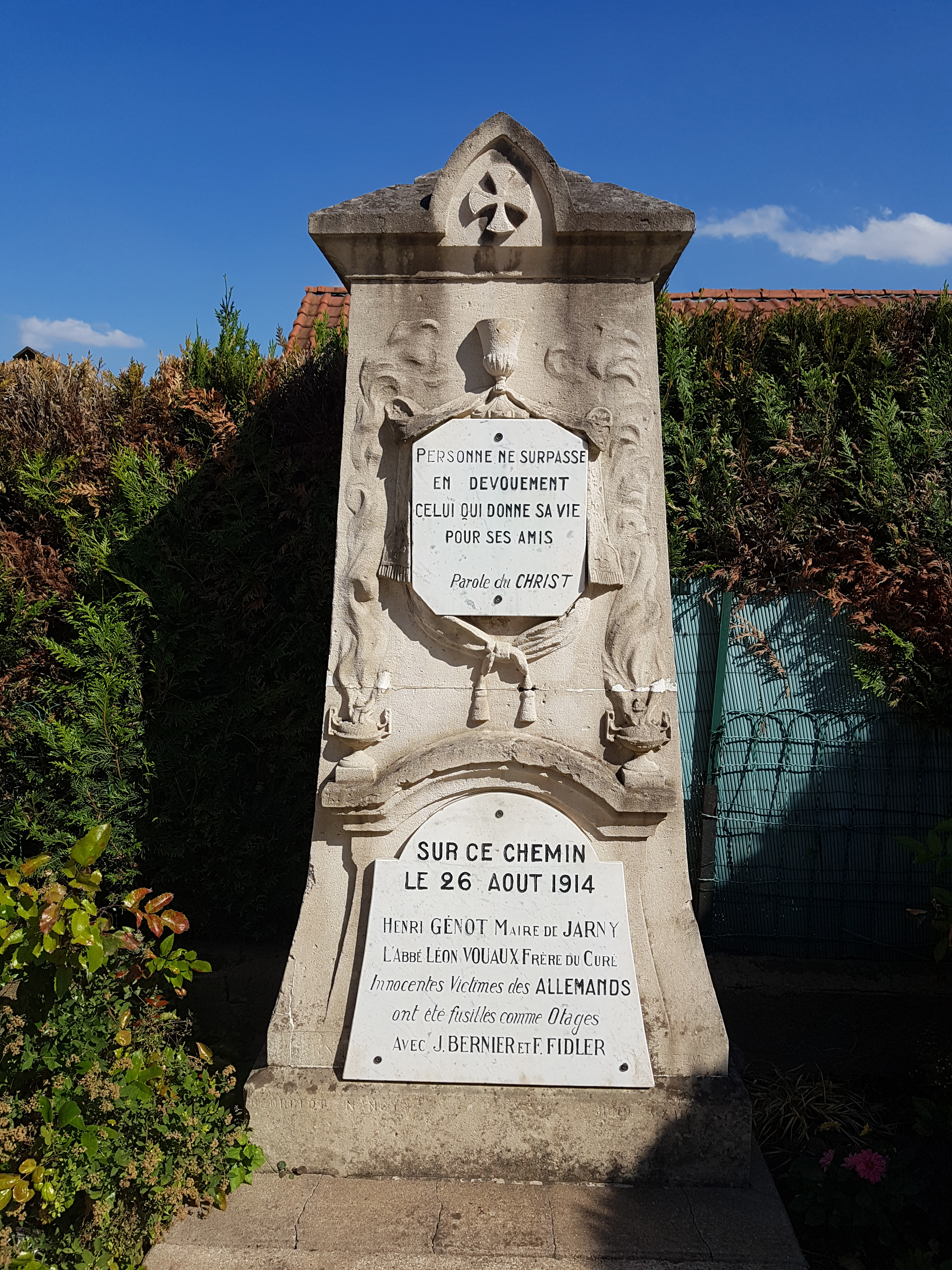
Monument to the executions in 1914

His death in the small town of Jarny on 26 August 1914 was caused by the First World War, even though he was a civilian. The town was only a few kilometres from the French-German border and was occupied during the first days of the war. He was shot by German forces along with the town's mayor and two other men in a reprisal or demonstration. He may have been present in place of his brother, the town's priest, who had volunteered for medical service. His death is recorded on a monument in Jarny and also among the list of writers who died in the First World War inscribed within the Pantheon in Paris.

== Legacy ==
Specimens that Vouaux collected are held in herbaria at universities in Marseille, Angers and elsewhere. Several fungal taxa have been named in his honour, including the genera Vouauxiella Petr. & Syd. (1927) and Vouauxiomyces Dyko & D.Hawksw. (1979); and the species Bilimbia vouauxii B.de Lesd. (1912); Buellia vouauxii Calat. & Barreno (1995); Crocynia vouauxii Hue (1924); Polyblastia vouauxii B.de Lesd. (1910); and Trachylia vouauxii Harm. (1911).

== Selected publications ==
- L. Vouaux, Synopsis des champignons parasites des lichens. Bull. Soc. Mycol. Fr., 28 pp 177–256 ; 29 pp 33–128, 30 pp 135–198, 281–329.
- Léon Vouaux Les actes de Paul et ses lettres apocryphes (The Acts of Paul and his Apocryphal Letters) (1913)
- Léon Vouaux Les actes de Pierre. Introduction, textes, traduction et commentaire (1922) Paris, Letouzey et Ané, Éditeurs,
