= Antoine Albalat =

French writer and literary critic

Antoine Albalat (1856–1935) was a French writer and literary critic.

== Works ==
Fiction

- (1877). Nella, Simple Histoire en Vers. Brignoles: Impr. de A. Vian.
- (1882). Inassouvie, Roman Intime. Paris: Paul Ollendorff.
- (1883). Un Adultère, Roman intime. Paris: Paul Ollendorff.
- (1886). La Faute d'une Mère. Paris: Paul Ollendorff.
- (1896). Une Fleur des Tombes. Histoire d'Amour. Paris: G. Havard Fils.
- (1897). Marie, Premier Amour. Paris: G. Havard Fils.
- (1905). L'Impossible Pardon. Paris: Émile Petit.

Non-fiction

- (1884). L'Amour chez Alphonse Daudet. Paris: Paul Ollendorff.
- (1895). Le Mal d'Écrire et le Roman Contemporain. Paris: Ernest Flammarion.
- (1896). L'Art d'Écrire: Ouvriers et Procédés. Paris: G. Havard Fils.
- (1899). L'Art d'Écrire Enseigné en Vingt Leçons. Paris: Armand Colin.
- (1901). La Formation du Style par l'Assimilation des Auteurs. Paris: Armand Colin.
- (1903). Le Travail du Style enseigné par les Corrections Manuscrites des Grands Écrivains. Paris: Armand Colin.
- (1905). Les Ennemis de l'Art d'Écrire. Paris: Librairie Universelle.
- (1907). Frédéric Mistral, son Génie, son Œuvre. Paris: E. Sansot.
- (1911). Lacordaire. Paris: Librairie Catholique Emmanuel Vitte.
- (1913). Comment il Faut Lire les Auteurs Classiques Français. Paris: Armand Colin.
- (1914). Joseph de Maistre. Paris: Librairie Catholique Emmanuel Vitte.
- (1921). Souvenirs de la Vie Littéraire. Paris: Arthème-Fayard et Cie.
- (1921). Comment il ne faut pas écrire: Les ravages du style contemporain. Paris: Librairie Plon.
- (1925). Comment on Devient Écrivain. Paris: Librairie Plon.
- (1927). Gustave Flaubert et ses Amis. Paris: Librairie Plon.
- (1929). L'Art Poétique de Boileau. Paris: Edgar Malfère Éditeur.
- (1930). Trente ans de Quartier Latin. Nouveaux Souvenirs de la Vie Littéraire. Paris: Edgar Malfère Éditeur.
- (1933). La Vie de Jésus d'Ernest Renan. Paris: Société Française d'Éditions Littéraires et Techniques.

Miscellany

- (1906). Veuillot, Louis. Pages Choisies, with an introduction by Antoine Albalat. Paris: Librairie Catholique Emmanuel Vitte.
- (1911). Les Poètes de Jeanne d'Arc. Préface by Jules Lemaître; introduction and notes, by Antoine Albalat. Paris: Librairie des Annales.

== Honors and awards ==
Knight of the Order of Legion of Honour
