= Estienne Durand =

French poet

Estienne Durand (c. 1586 – 19 July 1618) was a 17th-century French poet.

A provincial controller of wars in the service of Marie de Medicis, he is the author of a pamphlet against Louis XIII, La Riparographie, now lost, which earned him to be broken and burned with his writings on the Place de Grève.

== Works ==
- Les Épines d'Amour (1604)
- Méditations (1611)
- Stances à l'inconstance

== Bibliography ==
- Frédéric Lachèvre, Estienne Durand, poète ordinaire de Marie de Médicis (1585–1618), Paris, Leclerc, 1905
- Frédéric Lachèvre, Méditations de Estienne Durand réimprimées sur l'unique exemplaire connu s. l. n. d. (vers 1611) précédées de la vie du poëte par Guillaume Colletet et d'une notice par Frédéric Lachèvre, Paris, Leclerc, 1906
- Jacques Bainville, Une histoire d'amour, Paris, Cahiers libres, 1929
