= Frédéric Lachèvre =

French bibliographer, erudit and literary critic

Frédéric Lachèvre (January 24, 1855, Paris – October 24, 1943) was a French bibliographer, erudit and literary critic, specialist in libertinage in the 17th century.

== Biography ==
A Parisian of old Norman stock, Frédéric Lachèvre was a bibliophile who was brought by his passion for books to be interested in forgotten and neglected people of the reign of Louis XIII during the 17th century, people of whom he became the historian.

After he began working at the Crédit lyonnais, he was appointed director of the Compagnie nouvelle du chemin de fer d'Arles à Saint-Louis-du-Rhône but withdrew from business at age 45 in order to entirely indulge in his passion for literature.

He was the author of a voluminous study on libertinism in the seventeenth century, collections of poetry of the 16th and 17th centuries, and bibliographies. Among others, he edited Angot de l'Éperonnière, Courval-Sonnet, Cyrano de Bergerac, Corneille-Blessebois, Claude Le Petit, Vallée Des Barreaux, Théophile de Viau, Estienne Durand, Boileau, Gabriel de Foigny, Jean Dehénault, Claude de Chauvigny de Blot, Étienne Martin de Pinchesne, Hercule de Lacger, Roger de Collerye, Saint-Pavin, Héliette de Vivonne, Isaac Du Ryer, Claude de Chaulne, Ch. de Besançon, Condé, Hotman, Carpentier de Marigny, Patris, le Chevalier de Rivière.

== Publications ==
- 1901–1905: Bibliographie des recueils collectifs de poésies publiés de 1597 à 1700, 4 vol., Paris, H. Leclerc.
- 1908: Voltaire mourant. Enquête faite en 1778 sur les circonstances de sa dernière maladie, Paris, Honoré Champion.
- 1909–1911: Le Procès du Poète Théophile de Viau, 2 vol. - Geneva, Slatkine Reprints, 1968.
- 1912: La Querelle des anciens et des modernes, Paris, Leclerc.
- 1914: Les Recueils collectifs de poésies libres et satiriques publiés depuis 1600 jusqu'à la mort de Théophile (1626), Champion.
- 1920: Geoffroy Vallée (brûlé le 9 février 1574) et La béatitude des Chrestiens : l’ancêtre des libertins du XVIIe, Champion.
- 1921: Les Œuvres libertines de Cyrano de Bergerac, 2 volumes.
- 1922: Bibliographie des recueils collectifs de poésies du XVIe, Champion.
- 1922: Claude Le Petit et la Muse de la cour, Champion.
- 1927: Le Casanova du XVIIe. Pierre Corneille Blessebois, Normand (1646?-1700?), Champion.
- 1928: Bibliographie sommaire de l'Almanach des muses (1765-1833), Giraud-Badin.
- 1929: Glanes bibliographiques et littéraires, Paris, L. Giraud-Badin.
- Les Derniers Libertins, Genève, Slatkine Reprints, 1968.
- 1929: Un point obscur de la vie de Scarron : Scarron et sa Gazette burlesque, Paris, Giraud-Badin.
