= Cyrano de Bergerac =

French novelist and dramatist (1619–1655)

- Savinien de Cyrano de Bergerac
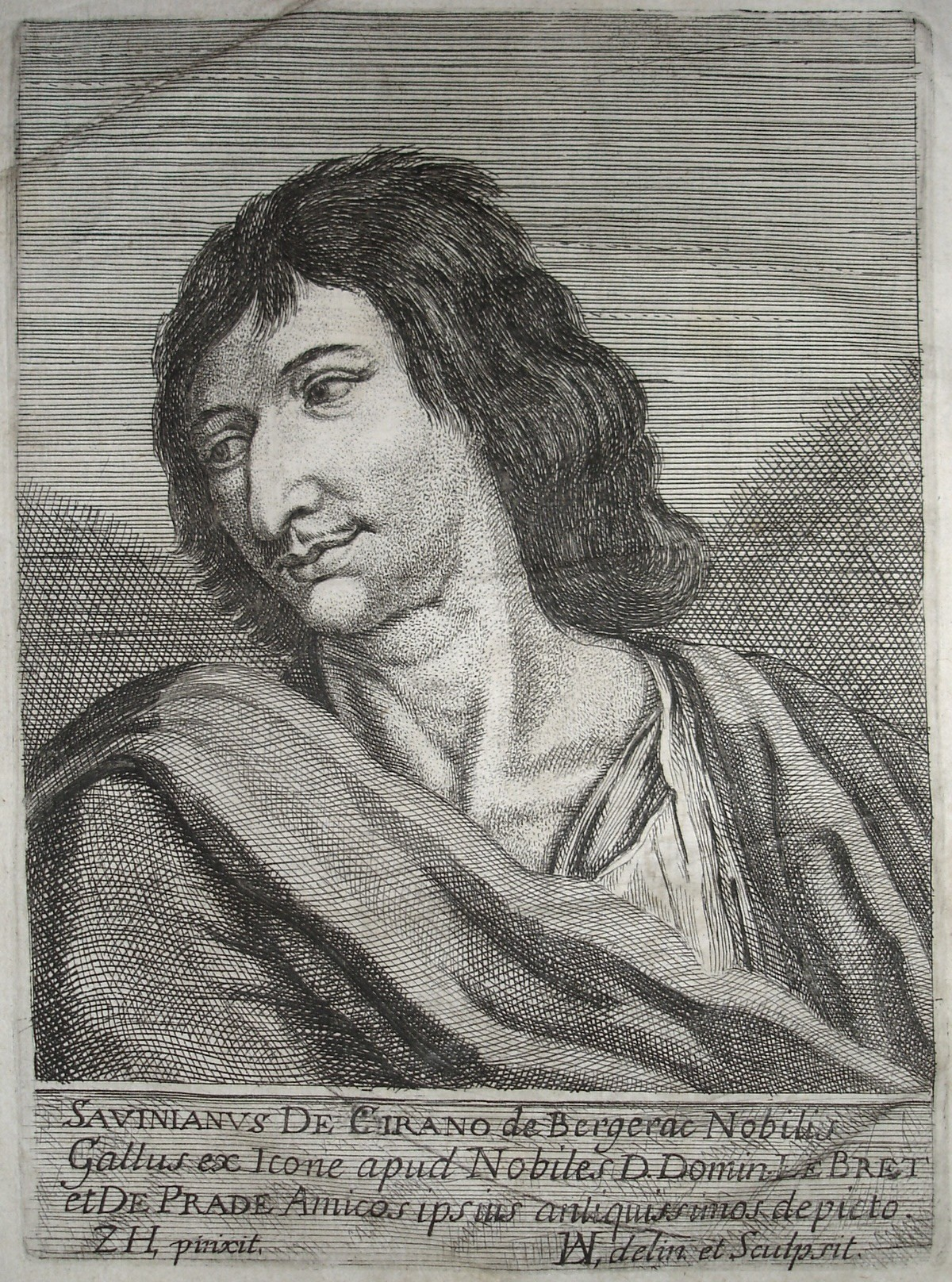
- Bergerac illustrated by Zacharie Heince, c. 1654
- Born: Savinien de Cyrano c. 6 March 1619 (Note: Though often cited as his date of birth, the 6th of March is actually the date of his baptism. At the time, it was usual for a baptism to take place within 3 days of birth and in Paris, with easy access to a priest, it would have been possible that it happened on the same day. However, the actual date remains unknown.); Paris, France
- Died: 28 July 1655 (aged 36); Sannois, France
- Occupations: Novelist, playwright, duelist
- Writing career
- Language: French
- Period: 1653–1662

Savinien de Cyrano de Bergerac (/ˌsɪrənoʊ də ˈbɜːrʒəræk, - ˈbɛər-/ SIRR-ə-noh də BUR-zhə-rak, – BAIR-, French: [savinjɛ̃ d(ə) siʁano d(ə) bɛʁʒəʁak]; 6 March 1619 – 28 July 1655) was a French novelist, playwright, epistolarian, and duelist.

A bold and innovative author, his work was part of the libertine literature of the first half of the 17th century. Today, he is best known as the inspiration for Edmond Rostand's most noted drama, Cyrano de Bergerac (1897), which, although it includes elements of his life, also contains invention and myth.

Since the 1970s, there has been a resurgence in the study of Cyrano, demonstrated in the abundance of theses, essays, articles and biographies published in France and elsewhere. Cyrano's novels L'Autre Monde: ou les États et Empires de la Lune ("Comical History of the States and Empires of the Moon", published posthumously, 1657) and Les États et Empires du Soleil (The States and Empires of the Sun, 1662) are classics of early modern science fiction. He was the first writer to depict space flight by use of a vessel that has rockets attached, and he introduced Moon-Men as an extraterrestrial race in his novels. Cyrano's mixture of science and romance in his novels is credited with influencing the works of Jonathan Swift, Edgar Allan Poe and probably Voltaire. Both Pierre Corneille and Molière freely borrowed ideas from Cyrano's works, although only Molière was accused of directly plagiarizing them.

== Life and works ==
He was the son of Abel de Cyrano, lord of Mauvières and Bergerac, and Espérance Bellanger. He received his first education from a country priest and had for a fellow pupil his friend and future biographer Henri Lebret. He then proceeded to Paris and the heart of the Latin Quarter, to the college de Dormans-Beauvais, where he had as master Jean Grangier, whom he afterwards ridiculed in his comedy Le Pédant joué (The Pedant Tricked) of 1654. At the age of nineteen, he entered a corps of the guards, serving in the campaigns of 1639 and 1640. As a minor nobleman and officer he was notorious for his dueling and boasting. His unique past allowed him to make unique contributions to French art.

One author, Ishbel Addyman, varies from other biographers and claims that he was not a Gascon aristocrat, but a descendant of a Sardinian fishmonger, and that the appellation Bergerac stemmed from a small estate near Paris where he was born, not in Gascony, and that he may have suffered tertiary syphilis. She also claims that he may have been homosexual and around 1640 became the lover of Charles Coypeau d'Assoucy, a writer and musician, until around 1653, when they became engaged in a bitter rivalry. This led to Bergerac sending d'Assoucy death threats that compelled him to leave Paris. The quarrel extended to a series of satirical texts by both men. Bergerac wrote Contre Soucidas (an anagram of his enemy's name) and Contre un ingrat (Against an ingrate), while D'Assoucy counterattacked with Le Combat de Cyrano de Bergerac avec le singe de Brioché, au bout du Pont-Neuf (The battle of Cyrano de Bergerac with the monkey of Brioché, at the end of the Pont-Neuf). He also associated with Théophile de Viau, the French poet and libertine.

He is said to have left the military and returned to Paris to pursue literature, producing tragedies cast in the orthodox classical mode.

The model for the character Roxane in Rostand's play Cyrano de Bergerac was Bergerac's cousin, who lived with his sister, Catherine de Bergerac, at the Convent of the Daughter of the Cross. As in the play, Bergerac did fight at the Siege of Arras in 1640, alongside another literary famous comrade in arms Charles de Batz de Castelmore d'Artagnan, a battle of the Franco-Spanish War (1635-1659) between French and Spanish forces in France (though this was not the Battle of Arras, fought fourteen years later). During the siege he suffered a neck wound from a sword during a sortie by the Spanish defenders, a day before the surrender of the Spanish troops and the end of the siege. One of his confrères in the battle was the Baron Christian of Neuvillette, who married Cyrano's cousin. However, the plotline of Rostand's play involving Roxane and Christian is entirely fictional.

Cyrano was a pupil of the French polymath Pierre Gassendi, a canon of the Catholic Church who tried to reconcile Epicurean atomism with Christianity.

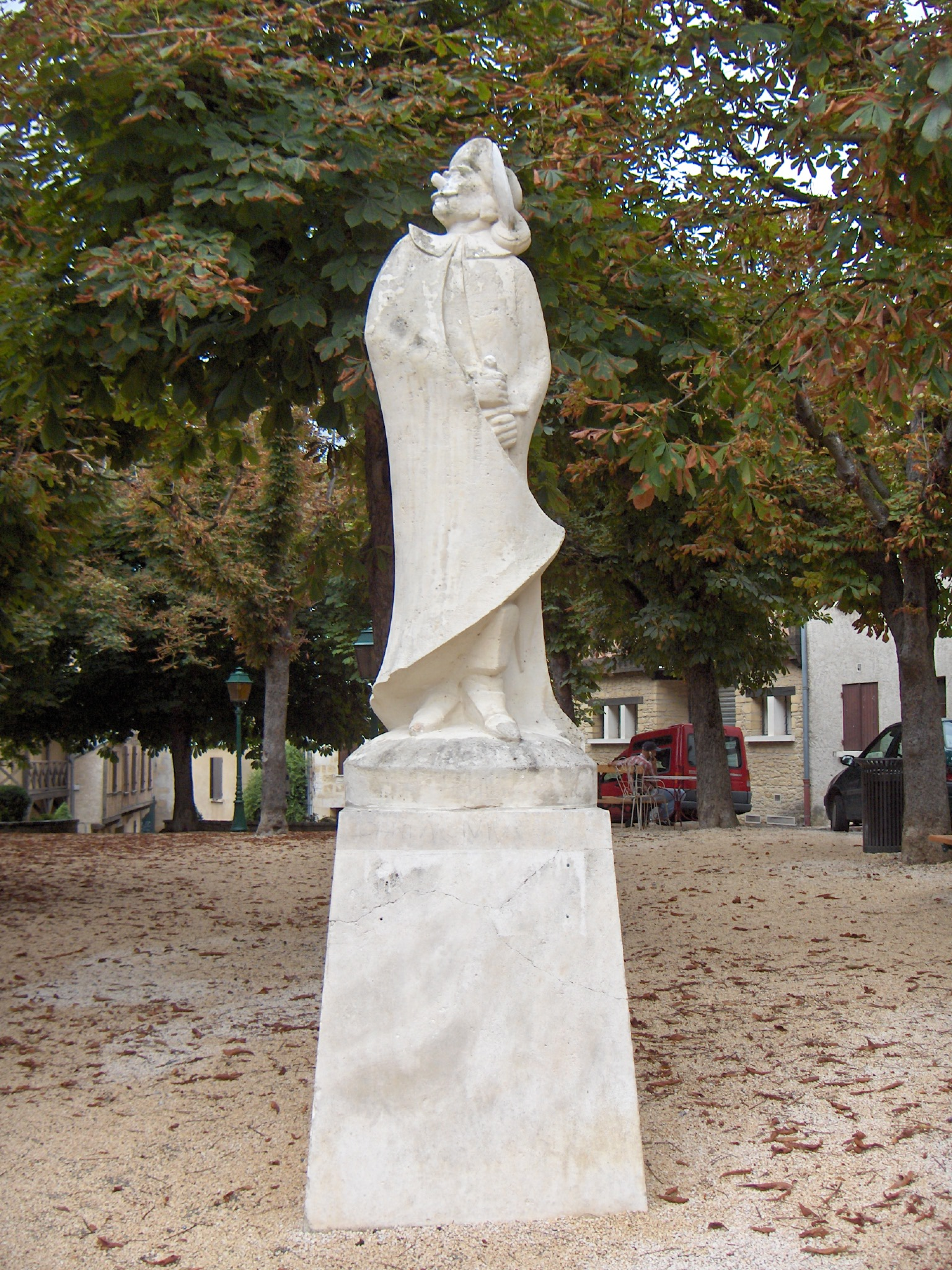
Statue in Bergerac, Dordogne (Place de la Myrpe)

Cyrano de Bergerac's works L'Autre Monde: ou les États et Empires de la Lune ("Comical History of the States and Empires of the Moon", published posthumously, 1657) and Les États et Empires du Soleil (The States and Empires of the Sun, 1662) are classics of early modern science fiction. In the former, Cyrano travels to the Moon using rockets powered by fireworks (it may be the earliest description of a space flight by use of a vessel that has rockets attached) and meets the inhabitants. The Moon-men have four legs, firearms that shoot game and cook it, and talking earrings used to educate children.

His mixture of science and romance in the last two works furnished a model for many subsequent writers, among them Jonathan Swift, Edgar Allan Poe and probably Voltaire. Corneille and Molière freely borrowed ideas from Le Pédant joué.

Accused of plagiarizing Le Pédant joué, Molière supposedly replied, "Il m'est permis de reprendre mon bien où je le trouve" ("I am allowed to take back my property where I find it.").

=== Death ===
The play suggests that he was injured by a falling wooden beam in 1654 while entering the house of his patron, the Duc D'Arpajon. However the academic and editor of Cyrano's works Madeleine Alcover uncovered a contemporary text which suggests an attack on the Duke's carriage in which a member of his household was injured. It is as yet inconclusive whether or not Cyrano's death was a result of the injury, or an unspecified disease.

Cyrano died over a year later on July 28, 1655, aged 36, at the house of his cousin, Pierre de Cyrano, in Sannois. He was buried in a church in Sannois. However, there is strong evidence to support the theory that his death was a result of a botched assassination attempt as well as further damage to his health caused by a period of confinement in a private asylum, orchestrated by his enemies, who succeeded in enlisting the help of his own brother Abel de Cyrano.

== In fiction and media ==
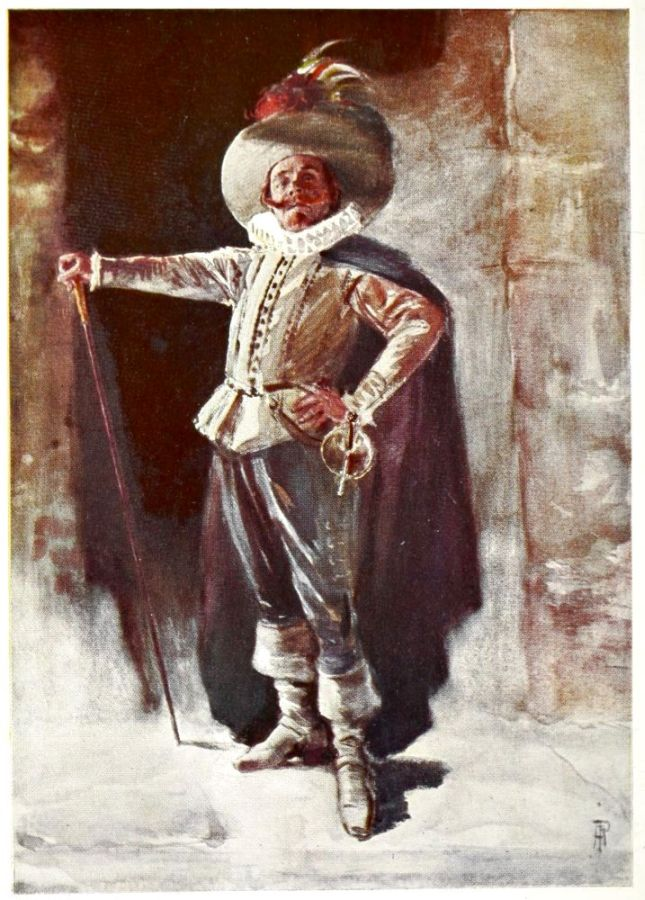
Actor Benoît-Constant Coquelin as Cyrano de Bergerac.

=== Rostand ===
Cyrano de Bergerac (/ˌsɪrənoʊ də ˈbɜːrʒəræk, - ˈbɛər-/ SIRR-ə-noh də BUR-zhə-rak, – BAIR-, French: [siʁano d(ə) bɛʁʒəʁak]) is a French play written in 1897 by Edmond Rostand. The play includes elements of the life of the 17th-century novelist and playwright Cyrano de Bergerac, along with elements of invention and myth. Cyrano's large nose is based on reality (see the accompanying portrait) but in performance of the play is usually exaggerated.

The entire play is written in verse, in rhyming couplets of twelve syllables per line, very close to the classical alexandrine form, but the verses sometimes lack a caesura. It is also meticulously researched, down to the names of the members of the Académie française and the dames précieuses glimpsed before the performance in the first scene.

The play has been translated and performed many times, and it is responsible for introducing the word panache into the English language. The character of Cyrano himself makes reference to "my panache" in the play. The most famous English translations are those by Brian Hooker, Anthony Burgess, and Louis Untermeyer.

=== Other authors ===
In A. L. Kennedy's novel So I Am Glad, the narrator finds de Bergerac has appeared in her modern-day house share.

In Robert A. Heinlein's novel Glory Road, Oscar Gordon fights a character who is not named, but is obviously Cyrano.

John Shirley published a story about Cyrano called "Cyrano and the Two Plumes" in a French anthology; it was reprinted at The Freezine of Fantasy and Science Fiction.

The novel by Adam Browne, Pyrotechnicon: Being a TRUE ACCOUNT of Cyrano de Bergerac's FURTHER ADVENTURES among the STATES and EMPIRES of the STARS, by HIMSELF (Dec'd), was a sequel to Cyrano's science fiction, published by Coeur de Leon in 2012.

Cyrano de Bergerac is the leading male character in Charles Lecocq's 1896 opéra comique Ninette.

Philip José Farmer's Riverworld novels include Cyrano as part of the main cast of characters.

=== Film ===
Most recently, his likeness was the center of a musical romantic drama, Cyrano, adapted as a screenplay by Erica Schmidt who had previously written the script as a stage musical of the same name.

==== 1990 film ====
Cyrano de Bergerac is a 1990 French period comedy-drama film directed by Jean-Paul Rappeneau and based on the 1897 play of the same name by Edmond Rostand, adapted by Jean-Claude Carrière and Rappeneau. It stars Gérard Depardieu, Anne Brochet and Vincent Perez. The film was a co-production between companies in France and Hungary.

The film is the first feature film version of Rostand's original play in colour, and the second theatrical film version of the play in the original French. It is also considerably more lavish and more faithful to the original than previous film versions of the play. The film had 4,732,136 admissions in France.

The film and the performance of Gérard Depardieu won numerous awards, notably 10 of the César Awards of 1991, two awards at the Cannes Film Festival and the People's Choice Award at the 15th Toronto International Film Festival.

Subtitles are used for the non-French market; the English-language version uses Anthony Burgess's translation of the text, which uses five-beat lines with a varying number of syllables and a regular couplet rhyming scheme, in other words, a sprung rhythm. Although he sustains the five-beat rhythm through most of the play, Burgess sometimes allows this structure to break deliberately: in Act V, he allows it to collapse completely, creating free verse.

In 2010, Cyrano de Bergerac was ranked number 43 in Empire magazine's "The 100 Best Films Of World Cinema".

==== Roxanne ====
Roxanne is a 1987 American romantic comedy film directed by Fred Schepisi and written by and starring Steve Martin. Also starring Daryl Hannah, Rick Rossovich, Shelley Duvall, Fred Willard, and Michael J. Pollard, the film is a contemporary adaptation of Edmond Rostand's 1897 play Cyrano de Bergerac. It follows Charlie "C.D." Bales, a witty and well-liked fire chief whose insecurity about his unusually large nose prevents him from expressing his feelings for Roxanne Kowalski, a visiting astronomy student.

Martin developed the project after years of admiring earlier adaptations of Cyrano de Bergerac and spent several years writing the screenplay. Filming took place during the summer of 1986 in Nelson, British Columbia, which served as the setting for the fictional small town depicted in the film. To portray C.D., Martin wore prosthetic nose makeup that required extensive daily application.

Released by Columbia Pictures in June 1987, Roxanne was a commercial success, grossing over $40 million in the United States and Canada. The film received generally favorable reviews from critics, with particular praise directed toward Martin's screenplay and performance. For his work, Martin received a Golden Globe nomination for Best Actor and won Best Actor from both the Los Angeles Film Critics Association and the National Society of Film Critics. Martin also won the Writers Guild of America Award for Best Screenplay.

== Bibliography ==
=== Original editions ===
- Cyrano de Bergerac (1654). La Mort d'Agrippine, tragédie, par Mr de Cyrano Bergerac [The Death of Agrippina, tragedy, by Mr de Cyrano Bergerac] (in French). Paris: Charles de Sercy.
- Cyrano de Bergerac (1654). Les Œuvres diverses de Mr de Cyrano Bergerac [The various works of Mr de Cyrano Bergerac] (in French). Paris: Charles de Sercy.
- Cyrano de Bergerac (1657). Histoire comique par Monsieur de Cyrano Bergerac contenant les Estats & Empires de la Lune [Comical History by Mr de Cyrano Bergerac including The States & Empires of the Moon] (in French). Paris: Charles de Sercy.
- Cyrano de Bergerac (1662). Les Nouvelles œuvres de Monsieur de Cyrano Bergerac. Contenant l'Histoire comique des Estats et Empires du Soleil, plusieurs lettres et autres pièces divertissantes [The New Works of Mr de Cyrano Bergerac. Including The Comical History of the States and Empires of the Sun, several letters and other diverting pieces] (in French). Paris: Charles de Sercy.
- Cyrano de Bergerac (1649). Le Ministre d'Estat flambé en vers burlesques [The Minister of State roasted in farcical verse] (in French). Paris: [s.n.].
- Cyrano de Bergerac (1709). Les œuvres diverses de M. Cyrano de Bergerac [The varied works of Mr. Cyrano de Bergerac] (in French). Vol. 1. Amsterdam: J. Desbordes.
- Cyrano de Bergerac (1709). Les œuvres diverses de M. Cyrano de Bergerac [The varied works of Mr. Cyrano de Bergerac] (in French). Vol. 2. Amsterdam: J. Desbordes.

=== Translations ===
- Cyrano de Bergerac (1658). Satyrical Characters, and handsome Descriptions in letters, written to severall Persons of Quality, by Monsieur De Cyrano Bergerac. Translated from the French by a Person of Honour. London: Henry Herringman.
- Cyrano de Bergerac (1659). ΣΕΛΗΝΑΡΧΙΑ, or, The government of the world in the moon: a comical history / written by that famous wit and caveleer of France, Monsieur Cyrano Bergerac; and done into English by Tho. St Serf, Gent. Translated by Thomas St. Serf. London: printed by J. Cottrel, and are to be sold by Hum. Robinson.
- Cyrano de Bergerac (1687). The Comical History of the States and Empires of the Worlds of the Sun and Moon. Written in French by Cyrano Bergerac. And newly Englished by A. Lowell, A.M. Translated by Archibald Lovell. London: Henry Rhodes.
- Cyrano de Bergerac (1889). Curtis Hidden Page (ed.). A Voyage to the Moon. Translated by Archibald Lovell. New York: Doubleday and McClure Co. At Project Gutenberg.
- Cyrano de Bergerac (1753). A voyage to the moon: with some account of the solar world. A comical romance. Done from the French of M. Cyrano de Bergerac. By Mr. Derrick. Translated by Samuel Derrick. London: Printed for P. Vaillant, R. Griffiths, and G. Woodfall.
- Cyrano de Bergerac; Friendly, Jonathon (1756). The agreement. A satyrical and facetious dream. To which is annexed, the truth, the whole truth, and nothing but the truth, &c. London: [s.n.] (The dream is a translation of D'un songe, first published in Lettres diverses.)
- Cyrano de Bergerac (1923). Voyages to the moon and the sun. Translated by Richard Aldington. London/New York: Routledge & Sons Ltd/E.P. Dutton & Co. At Project Gutenberg

=== Critical editions ===
- Cyrano de Bergerac (1858). Paul Lacroix Jacob (ed.). Histoire comique des États et empires de la Lune et du Soleil [Comical History of the States and Empires of the Moon and the Sun] (in French). Paris: Adolphe Delahays.
- Cyrano de Bergerac (1858). Paul Lacroix Jacob (ed.). Œuvres comiques, galantes et littéraires [Comical, gallant and literary works] (in French). Paris: Adolphe Delahays.
- Lachèvre, Frédéric (1921). Les Œuvres libertines de Cyrano de Bergerac, Parisien (1619–1655), précédées d'une notice biographique. Tome premier [The Libertine Works of Cyrano de Bergerac, Parisian (1619–1655), preceded by a biographical notice. Volume one] (in French). Paris: Librairie ancienne Honoré Champion.

L'Autre monde: I. Les Estats et Empires de la Lune (texte intégral, publié pour la première fois, d'après les manuscrits de Paris et de Munich, avec les variantes de l'imprimé de 1657). — II. Les Estats et Empires du Soleil (d'après l'édition originale de 1662)
The Other World: I. The States and Empires of the Moon (full text published for the first time following the Paris and Munich manuscripts including variations from the 1657 edition). — II. The States and Empires of the Sun (following the original edition of 1662)

- Lachèvre, Frédéric (1921). Les Œuvres libertines de Cyrano de Bergerac, Parisien (1619–1655), précédées d'une notice biographique. Tome second [The Libertine Works of Cyrano de Bergerac, Parisian (1619–1655), preceded by a biographical notice. Volume two] (in French). Paris: Librairie ancienne Honoré Champion.

Le Pédant joué, comédie, texte du Ms. de la Bibl. nat., avec les variantes de l'imprimé de 1654. — La Mort d'Agrippine, tragédie. — Les Lettres, texte du Ms. de la Bibl. nat. avec les var. de 1654. — Les Mazarinades: Le Ministre d'Etat flambé; Le Gazettier des-interessé, etc. — Les Entretiens pointus. — Appendice: Le Sermon du curé de Colignac, etc...
The Pedant tricked, comedy, text from Mss. in the National Library with variations from the edition of 1654. — The Death of Agrippina, tragedy. — The Letters, text from Mss. in the National Library with variations from 1654 edition. — The Mazarinades: The Minister of State roasted; The disinterested Gazetteer, etc. — The sharp interviews. — Appendix: The sermon of the curate of Colignac, etc...

- Cyrano de Bergerac (1962). Claude Mettra; Jean Suyeux (eds.). Histoire comique des État et empire de la Lune et du Soleil [Comical History of the States and Empires of the Moon and the Sun] (in French). Paris: Jean-Jacques Pauvert et Club des Libraires de France.

Includes an afterword, a dictionary of characters, chronological tables and notes. Illustrated with engravings taken from scientific works of the time.

- Cyrano de Bergerac (1977). Madeleine Alcover (ed.). L'Autre Monde ou les Estats et Empires de la lune [The Other World or the States and Empires of the Moon]. Société des textes français modernes (in French). Paris: Honoré Champion.
- Cyrano de Bergerac (1982). La Mort d'Agrippine [The Death of Agrippina]. Textes Littéraires (in French). Vol. 44. Exeter: University of Exeter. ISBN 0-85989-182-8.
- Cyrano de Bergerac (1998). Jacques Prévot (ed.). L'Autre monde: Les États et empires de la Lune. Les États et empires du Soleil [The Other World: The States and Empires of the Moon. The States and Empires of the Sun.]. Bibliothèque de la Pléiade: Libertins du XVIIe siècle (in French). Vol. I. Paris: Gallimard.

Includes an introduction, chronology and bibliography

- Cyrano de Bergerac (1999). Jean-Charles Darmon; Alain Mothu (eds.). Lettres satiriques et amoureuses, précédées de Lettres diverses (in French). Paris: Desjonquères.
- Cyrano de Bergerac (2001). Madeleine Alcover (ed.). Œuvres complètes: L'Autre Monde ou les États et Empires de la lune. Les États et empires du soleil. Fragment de physique [Complete Works: The Other World or the States and Empires of the Moon. The States and Empires of the Sun. Fragment of Physics] (in French). Vol. I. Paris: Honoré Champion. ISBN 978-2-7453-1452-9.

Republished as:
- Cyrano de Bergerac (2004). Madeleine Alcover (ed.). Les États et Empires de la Lune et du Soleil (avec le Fragment de physique) [The States and Empires of the Moon and the Sun (with the Fragment of Physics)]. Champion Classiques: Littératures (in French). Paris: Honoré Champion.

- Cyrano de Bergerac (2001). Luciano Erba; Hubert Carrier (eds.). Œuvres complètes: Lettres. Entretiens pointus. Mazarinades. Les États et empires de la lune. Les États et empires du soleil. Fragment de physique (in French). Vol. II. Paris: Honoré Champion. ISBN 978-2-7453-0429-2.
- Cyrano de Bergerac (2001). André Blanc (ed.). Œuvres complètes: Théâtre [Complete Works: Theatre] (in French). Vol. III. Paris: Honoré Champion. ISBN 978-2-7453-0419-3.
- Cyrano de Bergerac (2003). Bérengère Parmentier (ed.). Les États et Empires du Soleil [The States and Empires of the Sun]. GF (in French). Paris: Flammarion.

Introduction, chronology, notes, documentation, bibliography and lexicon by Bérengère Parmentier.

== See also ==
- Asteroid 3582 Cyrano, named after de Bergerac
