= Brigitte Lovisa Fouché =

French painter

Brigitte Lovisa Fouché (born 1958) is a French painter born in the Southern French commune of Dax. After graduating from the École nationale supérieure des arts appliqués et des métiers d'art (ENSAAMA) in Paris, she worked for 15 years as a glazier painter for Sylvie Gaudin's studio.

Specialising in mural art, Fouché has painted a large collection in vivid acrylic colors with deconstructed patterns. 'A brother gone to Polynesia' remains one of her claimed inspirations.

== Links ==
- Official website
- Artrinet critic of Fouche's works
