= Lacordaire =

Lacordaire is a surname. Notable people with the surname include:

- Jean Théodore Lacordaire (1801–1870), Belgian entomologist
- Jean-Baptiste Henri Lacordaire (1802–1861), French preacher

== See also ==
- Colegio Lacordaire
- Lacordaire Academy
- Lacordaire Boulevard
