= Joseph Anglade =

French philologist (1868–1930)

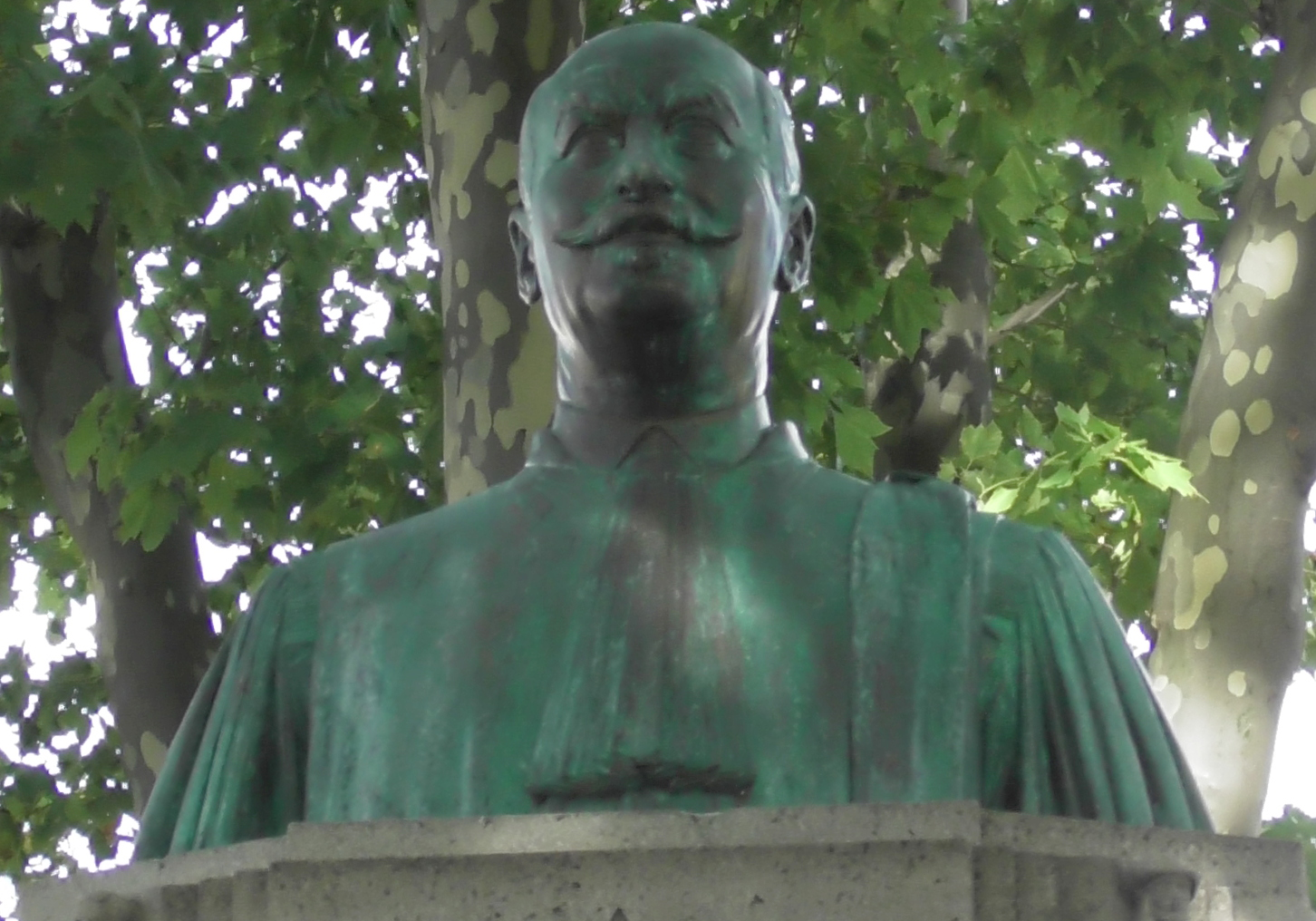
- Monument to Joseph Anglade public garden of Lézignan-Corbières
- Born: 11 October 1868; Lézignan-Corbières
- Died: 13 July 1930 (aged 61)
- Citizenship: French
- Occupation: philologist

Joseph Anglade (1868 – 1930) was a French philologist. He specialized in Romance languages, particularly Occitan, and studied the lyrics of the troubadours. He was instrumental in formalizing the term Occitan for the language of Provence.

He founded the Societat d'Estudis Occitans (SEO) in Toulouse, a predecessor of the Institut d'Estudis Occitans.

== Career ==
Joseph Anglade became a college and faculty professor in Toulouse where he taught southern languages and literature.

He published numerous works on Occitan, the troubadours, and their history, including a grammar of the Old Provençal, and founded a Southern Resource Center (Institute of Southern Studies), of which the Occitan and Southern Resource Center is today the heir.

From 1918 until his death, he was a board member of Félibrige.

== Works ==
- Le Troubadour Guiraud Riquier. Étude sur la décadence de l'ancienne poésie provençale (1905)
- Les Troubadours, leurs vies, leurs œuvres, leur influence (1908)
- La Bataille de Muret (1913)
- Onomastique des troubadours (1916)
- Poésies du Troubadour Peire Raimon de Toulouse (1920)
- Histoire sommaire de la littérature méridionale au Moyen-Âge (1921)
- Anthologie des troubadours (1927)
- Les Troubadours de Toulouse (1928)
- Les Troubadours et les Bretons (1929)
- Pour étudier les patois méridionaux. Notice bibliographique
- Grammaire élémentaire de l'ancien français
- Grammaire de l'Ancien Provençal ou ancienne Langue d'Oc. Phonétique & morphologie
- Notes sur l'emploi de l'article en français
