= Fontaine Chaude =

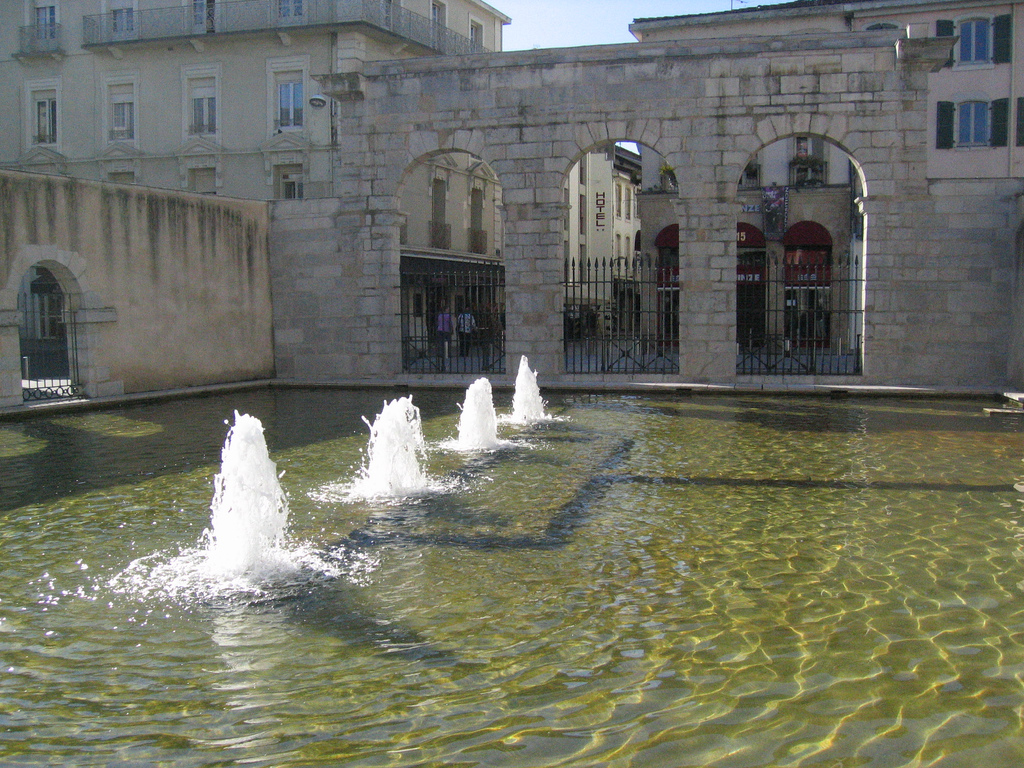

- Location within France

General information
- Architectural style: neoclassic
- Location: Dax, France
- Coordinates: 43.710972°N 1.053054°W
- Construction started: 1814
- Completed: 1818

La Fontaine chaude (French for "the hot fountain") is a spa located in the centre of Dax. The fountain itself is a Monument historique since 1946, while the portico and the remains of older structures around the fountain were registered on September 9, 1988.

The fountain was built from 1814 to 1818, under the reign of Louis XVIII, upon the remains of older therms from the Roman period which given the waters' high temperature (86 °C) could also be used for cooking.

The water is well known for its healing properties. A legend reports of a garrisoned Roman soldier who had a dog crippled with rheumatism. On call-up and aware that his poor dog could no longer follow him, he resorted to throw it into the Adour river. On his return, he was overwhelmed to find his dog reanimated by the thermal mud where it had ended up on the riverbank.

The water is also employed to treat phlebological and gynecological disorders. The "Dax Peloid" is a natural medication, obtained from the spa waters along with algae and silt from the Adour river.

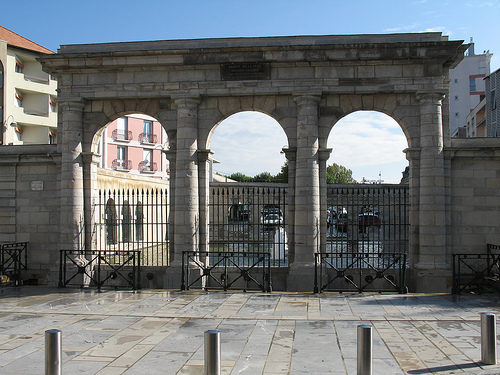

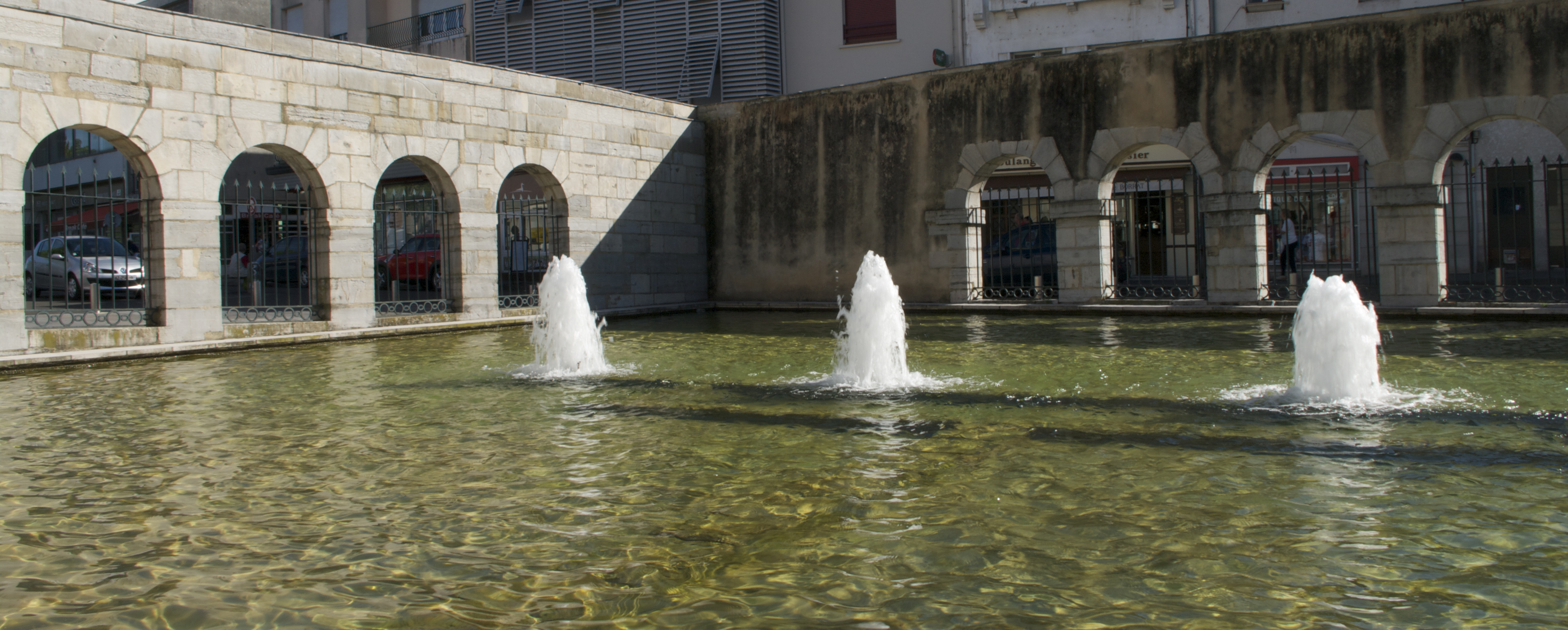

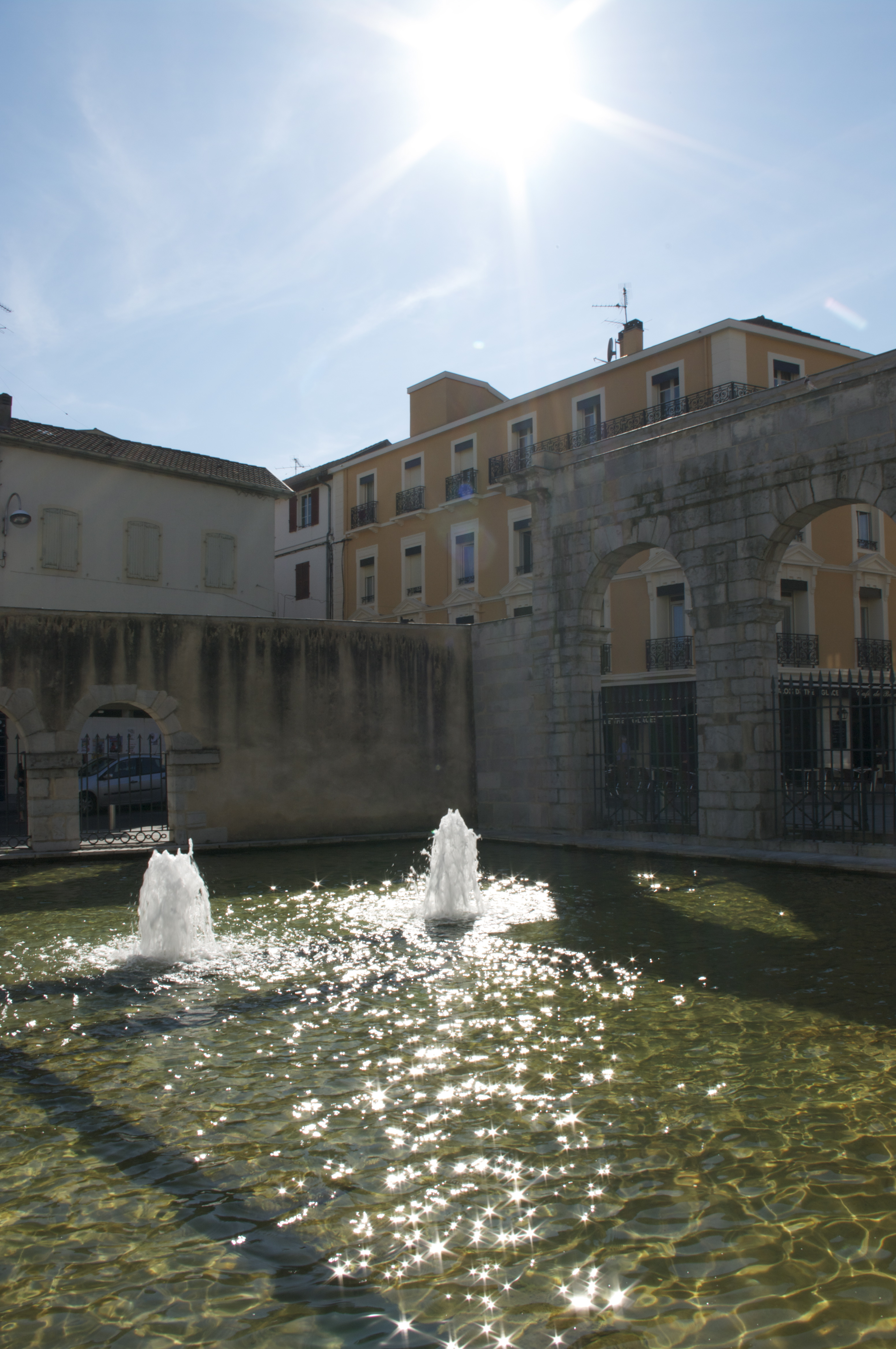

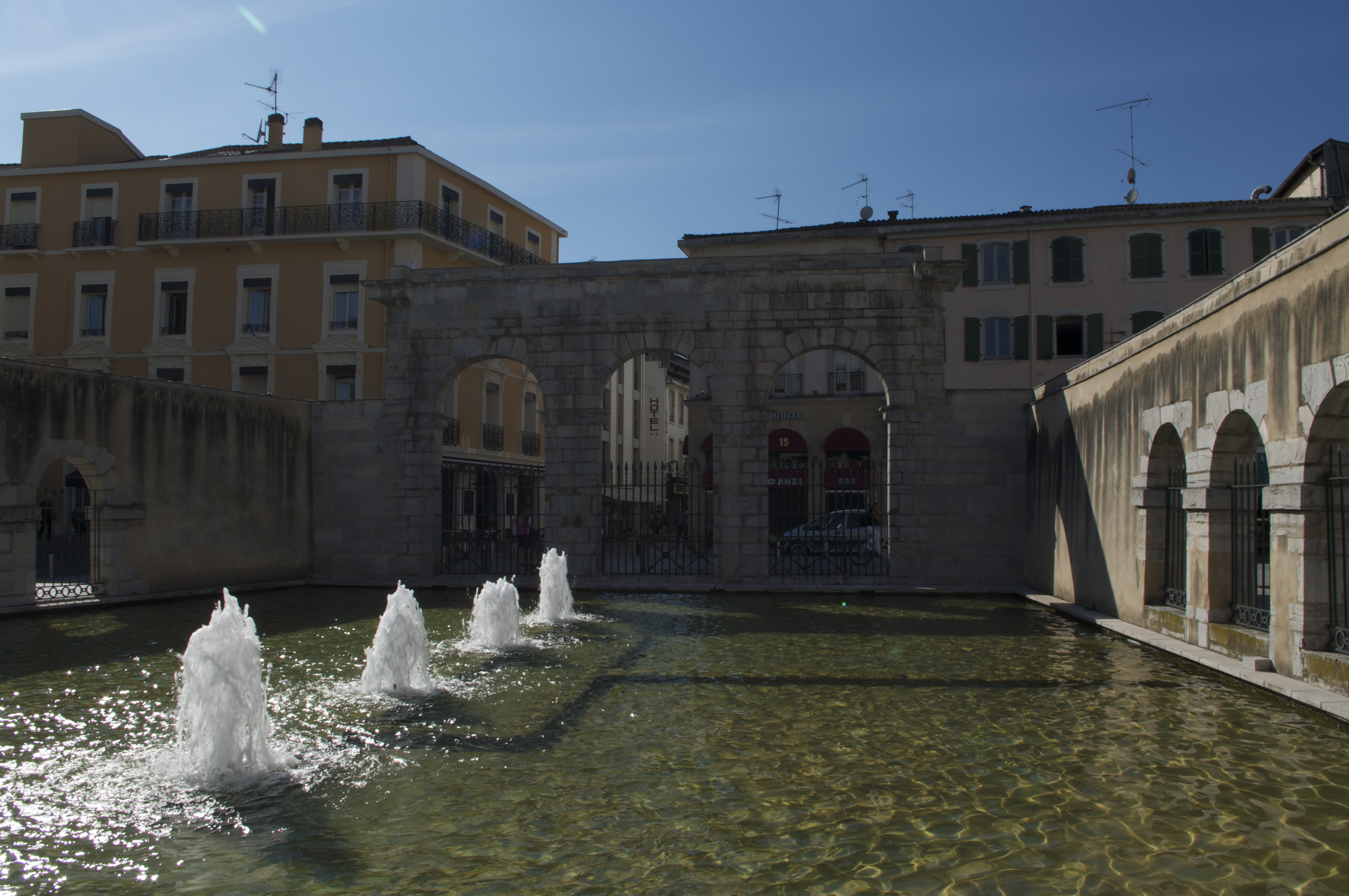

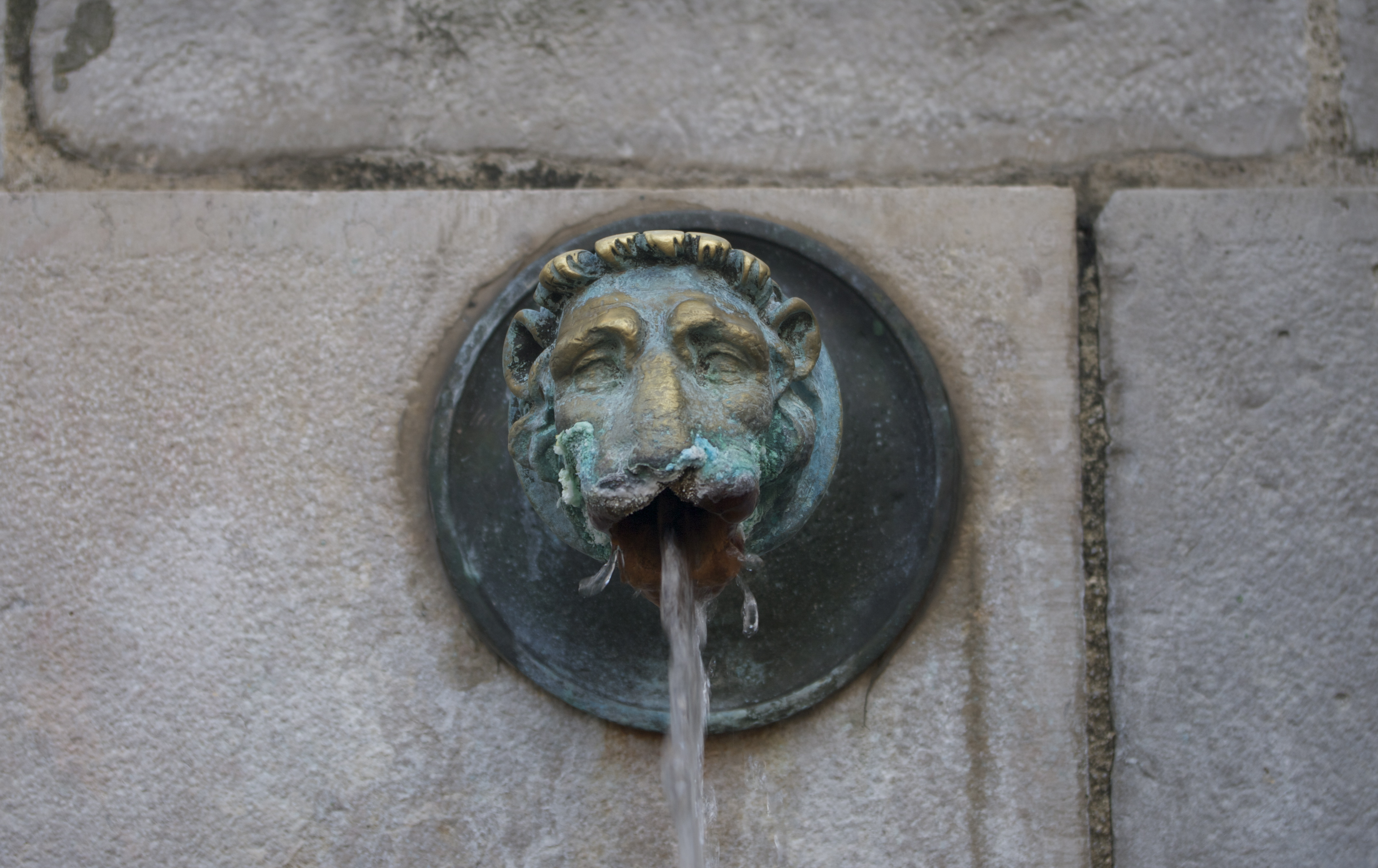
