= Roger de Collerye =

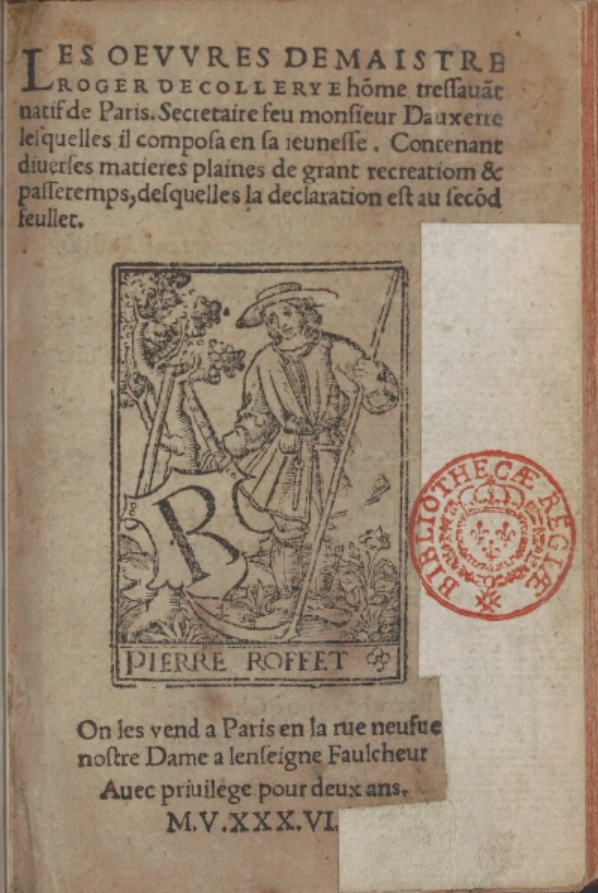
Titlepage of a 1536 work of Collerye

Roger de Collerye (c. 1470–1540), nicknamed Roger Bontemps, was a priest and secretary of the Bishop of Auxerre. He was famous for his jovial personality, and presided over a convivial society at Auxerre, earning the facetious title the "Mad Abbot". He left some writings in prose and verse, which are known from 1536 and were reprinted in 1856 by Charles Héricault.
