= Émile Magne =

French writer, critic and historian of literature and art

Émile Magne (29 July 1877 – 28 March 1953) was a French writer, critic, historian of literature and art.

== Biography ==
Born in Dax, Émile Magne attended the lycée of Bordeaux, then was a student at the Sorbonne. In 1898 he published a first study of documentation errors in the Cyrano de Bergerac by Edmond Rostand. He specialized in the history, mainly literary history, of the French 17th century.

A collaborator of the Mercure de France, he also published works on heritage and art.

Émile Male died in Saint-Maur-des-Fossés aged 75.

== Main publications ==
- Les Erreurs de documentation de Cyrano de Bergerac, Paris, Revue de France, 1898.
- Le Cyrano de l'Histoire, Paris, Dujarric, 1903.
- Bertran de Born, Paris, Lechevalier, 1904.
- Scarron et son milieu, Paris, Mercure de France, 1905.
- Madame de Villedieu, Mercure de France, 1907.
- Madame de La Suze et la Société précieuse, Mercure de France, 1908.
- L'Esthétique des villes, Mercure de France, 1908.
- Le Plaisant Abbé de Boisrobert, fondateur de l'Académie française, Paris, 1909.
- Madame de Châtillon, Mercure de France, 1910.
- Voiture et les Origines de l'hôtel de Rambouillet, Mercure de France, 1911.
- Gaultier-Garguille, comédien de l'hôtel de Bourgogne, Paris, Louis-Michaud, 1911.
- Voiture et les Années de gloire de l'hôtel de Rambouillet, Mercure de France, 1912.
- Les Femmes illustres : Ninon de Lenclos, Paris, Nilson, 1912.
- Nicolas Poussin, premier peintre du roi, Brussel, Van Oest, 1914.
- Jean de La Bruyère (1645-1696), Paris, Plon-Nourrit, 1914.
- Lettres inédites du Grand Condé et du duc d'Enghien à Marie-Louise de Gonzague, reine de Pologne, sur la cour de Louis XIV, Paris, Émile Paul, 1920.
- Une amie inconnue de Molière, Paris, Émile Paul, 1922.
- Le Vrai Visage de La Rochefoucauld, Paris, Ollendorff, 1923.
- Madame de La Fayette en ménage, 1926.
- Le Cœur et l'Esprit de Madame de La Fayette, Émile Paul, 1927
- Le Salon de Madeleine de Scudéry, ou le Royaume de Tendre, Monaco, Imprimerie de Monaco, 1927.
- Bibliographie générale des œuvres de Nicolas Boileau-Despréaux et de Gilles et Jacques, Paris, L. Giraud-Badin, 1929.
- Boileau. Documents inédits, L. Giraud-Badin, 1929.
- Les Plaisirs et les Fêtes. Les fêtes en Europe au XVIIe siècle, Paris, Rombaldi, 1930.
- Le Château de Saint-Cloud, Paris, Calmann-Lévy, 1932.
- Le Château de Marly, Calmann-Lévy, illustrations by [[Charles Émile Egli[Carlègle]] (album for children), Calmann-Lévy, 1935.
- Naissance de l'Académie française, Paris, L'Illustration, 1935.
- Images de Paris sous Louis XIV. Documents inédits, Calmann-Lévy, 1939.
- La Vie quotidienne au temps de Louis XIV, Paris, Hachette, 1942.

== Distinctions ==
- Croix de guerre 1914-1918
- Chevalier of the Légion d'honneur (1920), officer (1927), then commandeur (1949)
- Laureate of the Académie française and the Société des gens de lettres
