= Auga =

- Commune
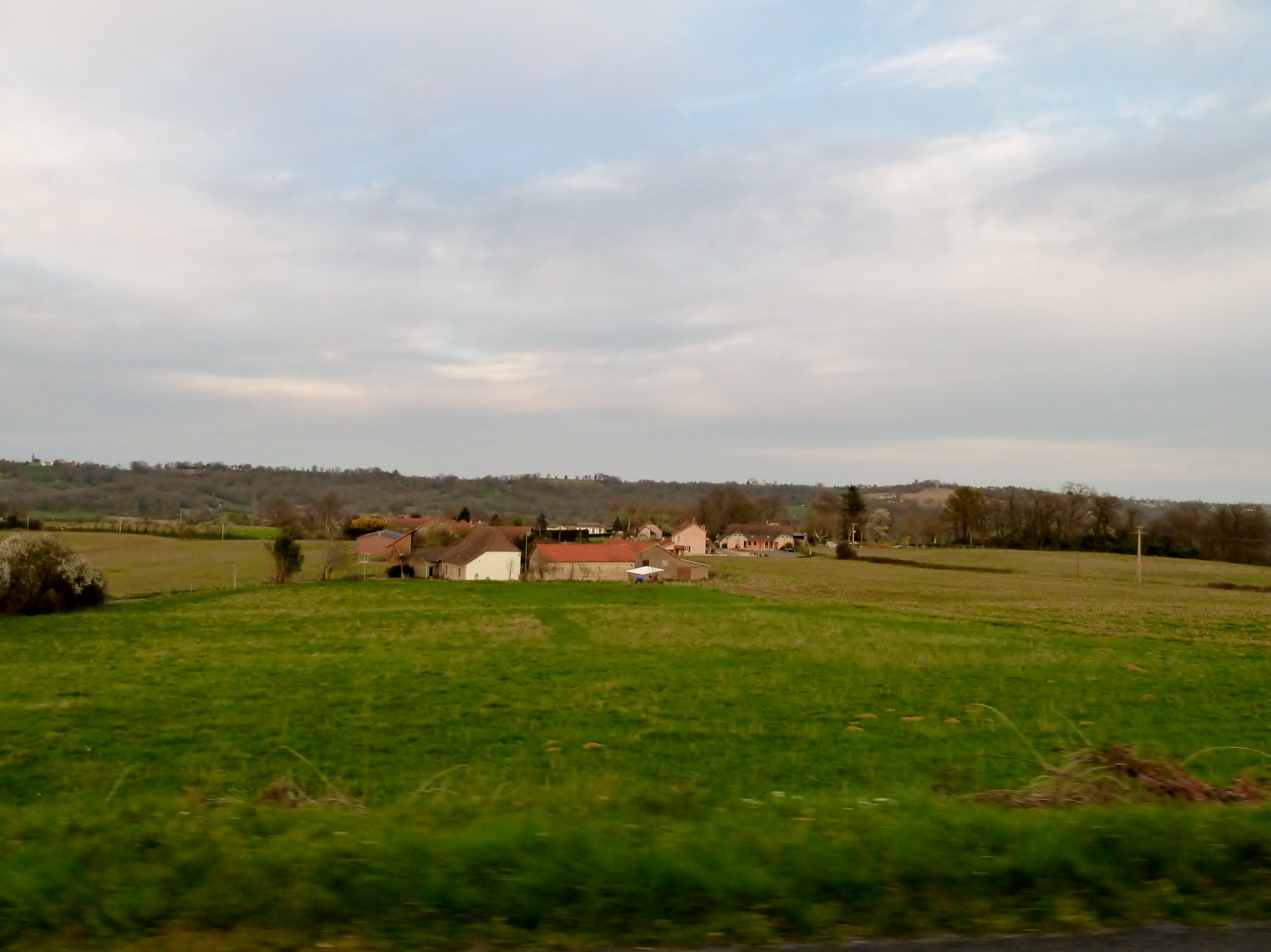
- Countryside in Auga
- Location of Auga
- Location within France Location within Nouvelle-Aquitaine
- Coordinates: 43°28′42″N 0°22′50″W
- Country: France
- Region: Nouvelle-Aquitaine
- Department: Pyrénées-Atlantiques
- Arrondissement: Pau
- Canton: Terres des Luys et Coteaux du Vic-Bilh
- Intercommunality: CC Luys en Béarn

Government
  - Mayor (2020–2026): David Legros
- Area^{1}: 4.03 km^{2} (1.56 sq mi)
- Elevation: 160 m (520 ft)
- Highest elevation: 258 m (846 ft)
- Lowest elevation: 123 m (404 ft)
- Population (2023): 189
  - Density: 46.9/km^{2} (121/sq mi)
- Time zone: UTC+01:00 (CET)
  - Summer (DST): UTC+02:00 (CEST)
- INSEE/Postal code: 64077 /64450
- ^{1} French Land Register data, which excludes lakes, ponds, glaciers > 1 km^{2} (0.386 sq mi or 247 acres) and river estuaries.

Auga (French pronunciation: [oɡa]; Occitan: Augar) is a commune in the Pyrénées-Atlantiques department in the Nouvelle-Aquitaine region of south-western France.

== Geography ==
Auga is located some 20 km north of Pau and 35 km east of Orthez. Access to the commune is by the D40 road which branches off the D944 just south of Méracq and goes south through the length of the commune and the village before continuing to join the D834 near Sauvagnon in the south. The D220 road goes south from the village to Viven. The commune is mostly farmland with scattered forests.

The Pyrénées-Atlantiques Interurban Network bus line has a stop in the commune on route 842 from Malaussanne to Pau.

The Luy de France flows north up the eastern side of the commune and continues north-west to join the Luy de Béarn to form the Luy north-east of Castel-Sarrazin.

=== Places and hamlets ===
- Bidot
- Bret
- Castaing
- Cazenave
- Claux
- Grange Haget
- Haou
- Laplante
- Lauroua
- Maupas
- Méhil
- Miraut
- Moun
- Pargade
- Parrot
- Pellarouy
- Péruillet

== Toponymy ==
The commune name in béarnais is Augar. Michel Grosclaude suggested the etymology is Gascon coming from augar meaning "marshy terrain".

The following table details the origins of the commune name and other names in the commune.

Name	Spelling	Date	Source	Page	Origin	Description
Auga	Algar	11th century	Raymond	16	Saint-Pé	Village
	Augar	13th century	Raymond	16	Fors de Béarn	
	Augaar	1385	Raymond	16	Census	
	Augaa	1437	Raymond	16	Homages	
	Sent Laurens d'Auguaa	1538	Raymond	16	Reformation	
	Augua	1544	Raymond	16	Reformation	
Abescat	Abescat	1673	Raymond	2	Reformation	Fief under the Viscounts of Béarn
Baradat	Baradat	1863	Raymond	20		Place

Sources:

- Raymond: Topographic Dictionary of the Department of Basses-Pyrenees, 1863, on the page numbers indicated in the table. (in French)
- Grosclaude: Toponymic Dictionary of communes, Béarn, 2006 (in French)

Origins:

- Saint-Pé: Cartulary of the Abbey of Saint-Pé
- Fors de Béarn
- Census: Census of Béarn
- Homages: Homages of Béarn
- Reformation: Reformation of Béarn

== History ==
Auriol Centulle, third son of Centule IV, Viscount of Béarn, and Angèle d'Oloron, was lord of Clarac, Igon, Baudreix, Boeil, and Auga.

Paul Raymond noted on page 17 of the 1863 dictionary that the commune had two Lay Abbeys, vassals of the Viscounts of Béarn: Abadie-Susan and Abadie-Jusan. In 1385, Auga had 22 fires and depended on the bailiwick of Pau. Auga was also a ruffebaronnie, vassal of the Viscounts of Béarn.

The fief of Abescat was also a vassal of the Viscounts of Béarn.

== Administration ==
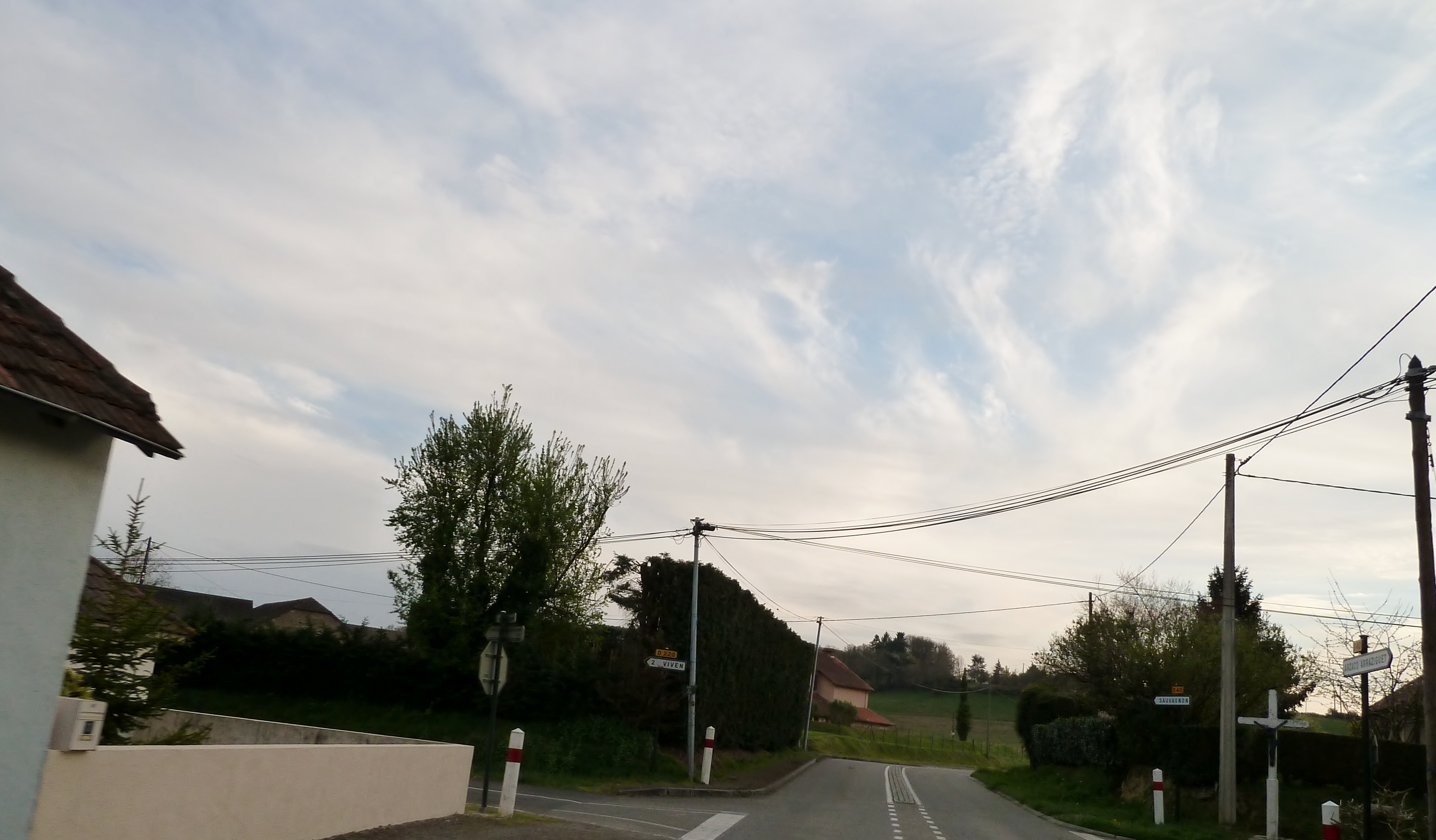
Auga Village

List of Successive Mayors

From	To	Name	Party	Position
1983	1995	Alexis Cassoulet		
1995	2001	Michel Chéret	PS	
2001	2008	Pierre Dubourdieu		
2001	2014	Pierre Chéret	PS	Regional Councillor
2014	2020	Jean-Paul Lacabanne		
2020	2026	David Legros		

=== Inter-communality ===
The commune is part of four inter-communal structures:

- the Communauté de communes des Luys en Béarn;
- the AEP association of Arzacq;
- the Energy association of Pyrénées-Atlantiques;
- the inter-communal association of Aubin-Auga-Doumy-Bournos;

== Demography ==
Historical population

Year	Pop.	±% p.a.
1793	244	—
1821	302	+0.76%
1846	307	+0.07%
1872	270	−0.49%
1901	192	−1.17%
1926	134	−1.43%
1946	148	+0.50%
1962	140	−0.35%
1968	138	−0.24%

Year	Pop.	±% p.a.
1975	114	−2.69%
1982	121	+0.85%
1990	136	+1.47%
1999	113	−2.04%
2007	149	+3.52%
2012	141	−1.10%
2017	153	+1.65%
2023	189	+3.58%

Source: EHESS and INSEE

== Culture and heritage ==
=== Civil heritage ===
The commune has a number of buildings and structures that are registered as historical monuments:

- The Haou Blacksmith's House (19th century)
- A House at Haou (19th century)
- A Farmhouse at Pellarouy (17th century)
- A Farmhouse at Pargade (1733)
- A Farmhouse at Miraut (1830)
- The Maison Lacabanne Farmhouse at Bret (17th century)
- The Maison Labescat House (19th century) This was one of the two Lay Abbeys mentioned by Paul Raymond which was rebuilt in the 19th century.
- A Mill at Grange Haget (1707)
- The Maison Dubourdieu House (19th century)
- A Farmhouse at Claux (1780)
- A Farmhouse at Bidot (1801)
- The Chateau d'Auga Fourcade fortified chateau (11th century)
- Houses and Farms (17th-19th centuries)

=== Religious heritage ===
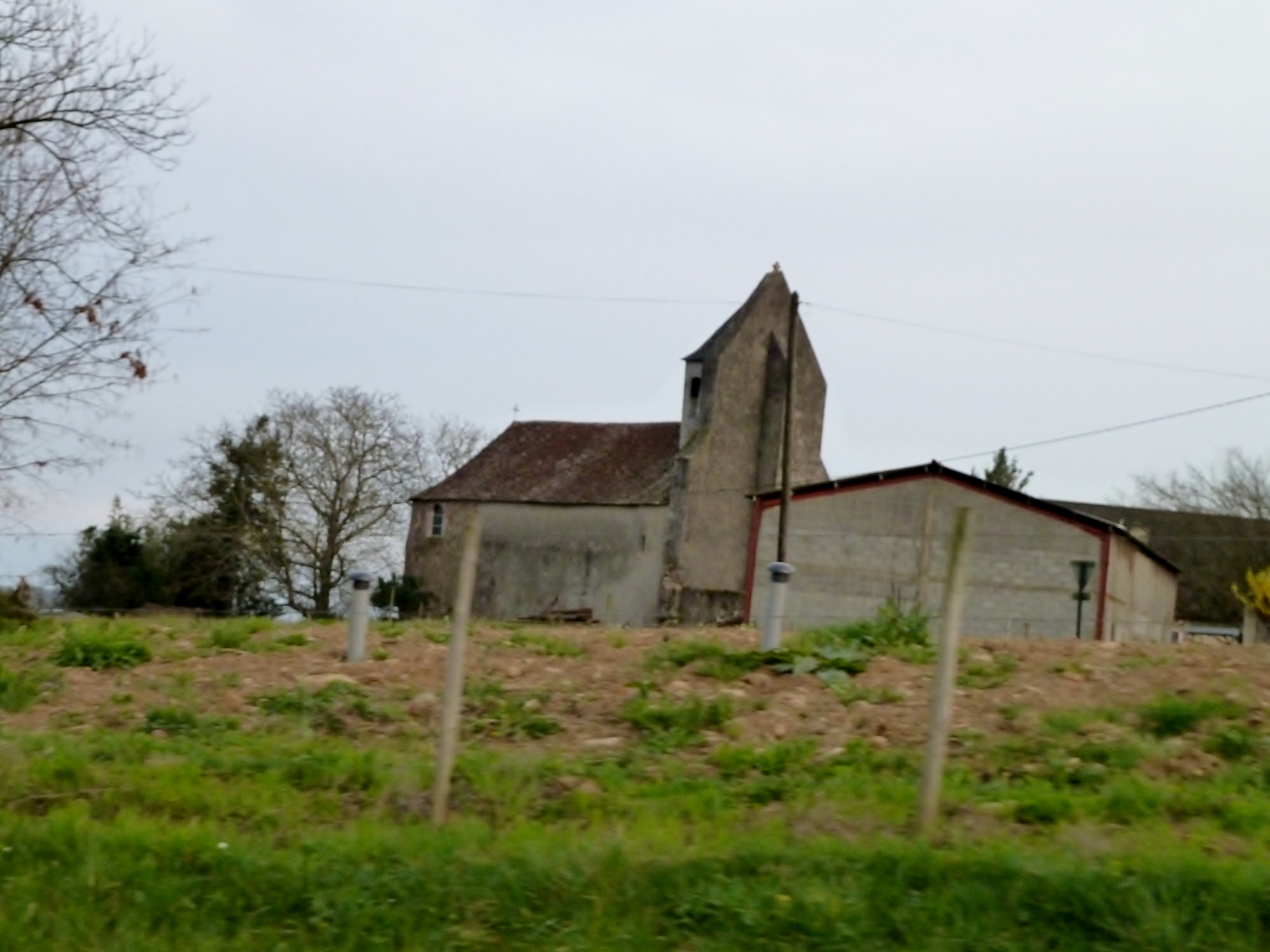
The Church of Saint-Laurent

The Parish Church of Saint-Laurent (12th century) is registered as a historical monument.

The Church contains several items that are registered as historical objects:

- The Furniture in the Church
- The Furniture in the Church (Supplementary list)
- A Painting: Christ on the Cross between the Virgin and Saint Laurent (18th century)
- Altar, Altar seating, Tabernacle, and 2 Statues (19th century)
- The Balustrade of the gallery (18th century)

== Facilities ==
=== Education ===
Auga has no primary school as it is part of an inter-communal educational regrouping with Aubin, Bournos, and Doumy.

=== Sports ===
People from the commune play football at ESBDG (Bournos Doumy Garlède Sports Group)

== See also ==
- Communes of the Pyrénées-Atlantiques department

=== External links ===
- Auga on Géoportail, National Geographic Institute (IGN) website (in French)
- Anga on the 1750 Cassini Map
