= Aubin, Pyrénées-Atlantiques =

Aubin
- Commune
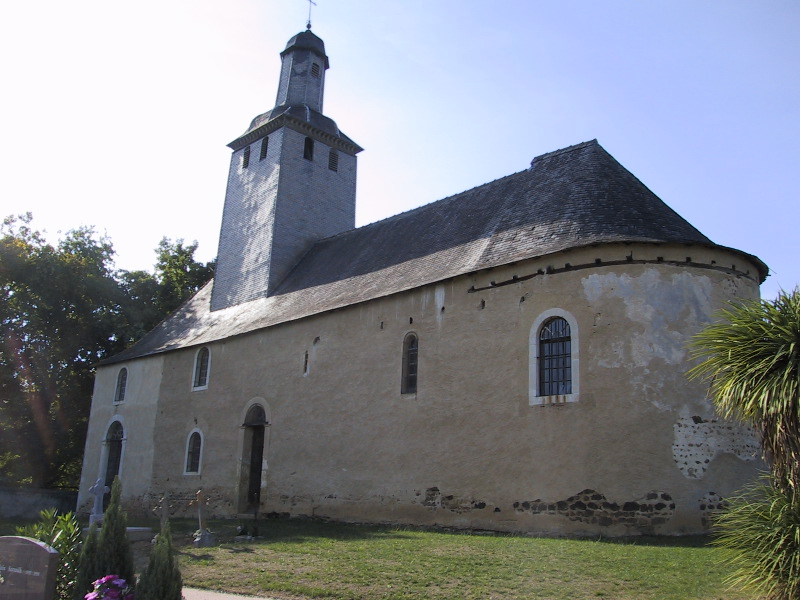
- The church of Aubin
- Location of Aubin
- Location within France Location within Nouvelle-Aquitaine
- Coordinates: 43°26′29″N 0°24′49″W
- Country: France
- Region: Nouvelle-Aquitaine
- Department: Pyrénées-Atlantiques
- Arrondissement: Pau
- Canton: Terres des Luys et Coteaux du Vic-Bilh
- Intercommunality: CC Luys en Béarn

Government
  - Mayor (2020–2026): Serge Lupiet
- Area^{1}: 5.84 km^{2} (2.25 sq mi)
- Elevation: 214 m (702 ft)
- Highest elevation: 262 m (860 ft)
- Lowest elevation: 142 m (466 ft)
- Population (2023): 265
  - Density: 45.4/km^{2} (118/sq mi)
- Time zone: UTC+01:00 (CET)
  - Summer (DST): UTC+02:00 (CEST)
- INSEE/Postal code: 64073 /64230
- ^{1} French Land Register data, which excludes lakes, ponds, glaciers > 1 km^{2} (0.386 sq mi or 247 acres) and river estuaries.

Aubin (French pronunciation: [obɛ̃]) is a commune in the Pyrénées-Atlantiques department in the Nouvelle-Aquitaine region of south-western France.

== Geography ==
Aubin is located some 35 km east by south-east of Orthez and 20 km north of Pau. The A65 autoroute passes through the commune but there is no exit in or near the commune with the nearest exit being Exit 9 south of Lalonquette or the beginning of the motorway just north of Lescar. Access to the commune is by the D210 road from Bournos in the east which goes to the village. The D216 from Sauvagnon in the south-east passes through the south of the commune on its way to Momas in the north-west. Country roads are also available to access the commune. There are some scattered forests in the commune but most of it is farmland.

The Luy de Béarn forms the south-western border of the commune as it flows north-west to join the Luy de France near Vieux-Bourg to become the Luy. The Aubiosse river flows through the south of the commune from east to west and joins the Luy de Béarn south-west of the commune. The Gez river forms the north-eastern border of the commune as it flows north-west to join the Luy de Béarn.

=== Places and hamlets ===
- Baradat
- Bas
- Bousquet
- Brunet
- Cabet
- Cambatu
- Carou
- Castet-Bieilh
- Cazaux (ruins)
- Combatu
- Dufau
- Guichot
- Lacoste
- Lafitte
- Larquier
- Lasalle
- Loulet
- Loustau
- Maribat
- Maupas
- Maysounave
- Plaisance
- Le Pouthiau
- Prué
- Soubette
- Tournemouly
- Turon

== Toponymy ==
The commune name in béarnais is Aubin. Michel Grosclaude proposed an etymology of the Latin man's name Albius with the suffix -inum (Albinum), the whole meaning "Domain of Albius".

The following table details the origins of the commune name:

Name	Spelling	Date	Source	Page	Origin	Description
Aubin	Sanctus Genumer de Albii	1101	Raymond	16	Cartulary	Village
	Elben	13th century	Raymond	16	Fors de Béarn	
	Aubii	1385	Raymond	16	Census	

Sources:

- Raymond: Topographic Dictionary of the Department of Basses-Pyrenees, 1863, on the page numbers indicated in the table. (in French)
- Grosclaude: Toponymic Dictionary of communes, Béarn, 2006 (in French)

Origins:

- Lescar: Cartulary of Lescar
- Fors de Béarn
- Census: Census of Béarn

== History ==
The village is first mentioned in 1101 as Sanctus-Genumer-de-Albii. At the start of the 11th century, the village and its church were given to the Bishop of Lescar by the wife of Viscount Centulle III.

Paul Raymond noted on page 16 of the 1863 dictionary that in 1385 Aubin had 17 fires and depended on the bailiwick of Pau. Bournos was also annexed to the parish of Aubin, the former archpriest of the Diocese of Lescar.

== Administration ==
List of Successive Mayors

From	To	Name
1995	2020	Jean-Louis Castetbieilh
2020	2026	Serge Lupiet

=== Inter-communality ===
The commune is part of four inter-communal structures:

- the Communauté de communes des Luys en Béarn;
- the Energy association of Pyrénées-Atlantiques;
- the inter-communal association for the management of drinking water for Luy - Gabas -Lées;
- the inter-communal association of Aubin-Doumy-Bournos.

== Demography ==
Historical population

Year	Pop.	±% p.a.
1793	308	—
1821	370	+0.66%
1846	365	−0.05%
1872	268	−1.18%
1901	196	−1.07%
1926	156	−0.91%
1946	123	−1.18%
1962	115	−0.42%
1968	113	−0.29%

Year	Pop.	±% p.a.
1975	110	−0.38%
1982	159	+5.40%
1990	199	+2.84%
1999	183	−0.93%
2007	228	+2.79%
2012	254	+2.18%
2017	239	−1.21%
2023	265	+1.74%

Source: EHESS and INSEE

== Culture and heritage ==
=== Civil heritage ===
The commune has a number of buildings and structures that are registered as historical monuments:

- A Farmhouse at Cambatu (17th century)
- Houses and Farms (17th century)
- A Fortified Complex named Castetbielh ("Old Castle") (High Middle Ages) - https://web.archive.org/web/20170205013449/http://visites.aquitaine.fr/ensemble-fortifie-castetbielh

=== Religious heritage ===
The commune has a church that is registered as a historical monument:

- The Parish Church of Saint Germain-d'Auxerre (12th century). The Church contains many items that are registered as historical objects, some of which were destroyed when the church was renovated in 1981:
  - Furniture in the Church
  - Furniture in the Church (Supplementary list)
  - A Mural Painting (1897) (Destroyed in 1981).
  - A Lectern (18th century)
  - A Pulpit (1897)
  - A Confessional (18th century)
  - An Altar, Altar seating, Tabernacle, statue, 4 Altar candlesticks (17th century)
  - An Altar, 2 rows of Altar seating, Tabernacle, 4 Altar candlesticks, Altar Cross (19th century) (All destroyed in 1981)
  - 5 Hilarri (1859)

== Facilities ==
Aubin has a primary school which is shared with Bournos, Auga, and Doumy as an inter-communal educational grouping.

== See also ==
- Communes of the Pyrénées-Atlantiques department

=== External links ===
- Community of communes of Luys en Béarn website (in French)
- Aubin on Géoportail, National Geographic Institute (IGN) website (in French)
- Aubin on the 1750 Cassini Map
