= Battle of Orthez order of battle =

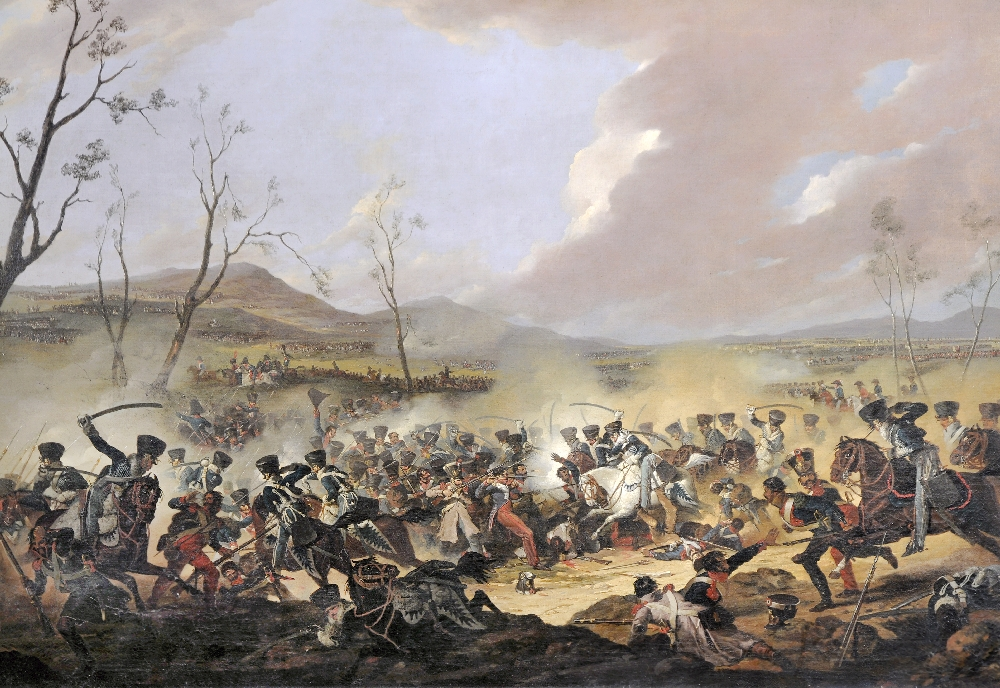
The Final Charge of the British Cavalry at the Battle of Orthez by Denis Dighton

The Battle of Orthez (27 February 1814) saw the Anglo-Portuguese Army commanded by Field Marshal Arthur Wellesley, Marquess of Wellington attack an Imperial French army under Marshal Nicolas Jean de Dieu Soult. Soult's army was posted on a ridge to the north of the town of Orthez in southern France and in the town itself. For over two hours the outnumbered French repulsed repeated Allied assaults on their right flank, forcing Wellington to order a general assault. After a struggle, the Allies overcame the French defenses and Soult was compelled to order a retreat. At first, the French divisions withdrew in good order, but as they approached the bridge over the Luy de Béarn at Sault-de-Navailles, many soldiers began to panic. The next day Soult decided that his army was too demoralized to resist more attacks and continued his retreat. Allied casualties were about 2,200 while the French lost about 4,000 killed, wounded and captured. The battle was fought near the end of the Peninsular War.

== Orders of Battle ==
=== Allied Army ===
Marquess Wellington's Army at Orthez
Corps	Division	Strength	Brigade	Strength	Units	Losses
Field Marshal; William Beresford	4th Division; Lieutenant General; Lowry Cole	5,952	Major General; William Anson	1,814	3rd Battalion/27th Infantry Regiment	6
Field Marshal; William Beresford	4th Division; Lieutenant General; Lowry Cole	5,952	Major General; William Anson	1,814	1st Battalion/40th Infantry Regiment	5
Field Marshal; William Beresford	4th Division; Lieutenant General; Lowry Cole	5,952	Major General; William Anson	1,814	1st Battalion/48th Line Infantry Regiment	14
Field Marshal; William Beresford	4th Division; Lieutenant General; Lowry Cole	5,952	Major General; Robert Ross (WIA)	1,735	1st Battalion/7th Infantry Regiment	68
Field Marshal; William Beresford	4th Division; Lieutenant General; Lowry Cole	5,952	Major General; Robert Ross (WIA)	1,735	1st Battalion/20th Infantry Regiment	123
Field Marshal; William Beresford	4th Division; Lieutenant General; Lowry Cole	5,952	Major General; Robert Ross (WIA)	1,735	1st Battalion/23rd Infantry Regiment	88
Field Marshal; William Beresford	4th Division; Lieutenant General; Lowry Cole	5,952	Brigadier General; José Vasconcellos	2,385	11th Port. Infantry Regiment, two battalions	148
Field Marshal; William Beresford	4th Division; Lieutenant General; Lowry Cole	5,952	Brigadier General; José Vasconcellos	2,385	23rd Port. Infantry Regiment, two battalions	122
Field Marshal; William Beresford	4th Division; Lieutenant General; Lowry Cole	5,952	Brigadier General; José Vasconcellos	2,385	7th Caçadores Battalion	25
Field Marshal; William Beresford	7th Division; Major General; George Townshend Walker	5,643	Lieutenant Colonel; John Gardiner	1,865	1st Battalion/6th Infantry Regiment	145
Field Marshal; William Beresford	7th Division; Major General; George Townshend Walker	5,643	Lieutenant Colonel; John Gardiner	1,865	2nd Battalion/24th Infantry Regiment	35
Field Marshal; William Beresford	7th Division; Major General; George Townshend Walker	5,643	Lieutenant Colonel; John Gardiner	1,865	2nd Battalion/56th Line Infantry Regiment	31
Field Marshal; William Beresford	7th Division; Major General; George Townshend Walker	5,643	Lieutenant Colonel; John Gardiner	1,865	Brunswick Oels Infantry Regiment	48
Field Marshal; William Beresford	7th Division; Major General; George Townshend Walker	5,643	Major General; William Inglis	1,420	51st Infantry Regiment	absent
Field Marshal; William Beresford	7th Division; Major General; George Townshend Walker	5,643	Major General; William Inglis	1,420	68th Infantry Regiment	31
Field Marshal; William Beresford	7th Division; Major General; George Townshend Walker	5,643	Major General; William Inglis	1,420	1st Battalion/82nd Infantry Regiment	38
Field Marshal; William Beresford	7th Division; Major General; George Townshend Walker	5,643	Major General; William Inglis	1,420	Chasseurs Britanniques Regiment	40
Field Marshal; William Beresford	7th Division; Major General; George Townshend Walker	5,643	Colonel; John Milley Doyle	2,358	7th Port. Infantry Regiment, two battalions	0
Field Marshal; William Beresford	7th Division; Major General; George Townshend Walker	5,643	Colonel; John Milley Doyle	2,358	19th Port. Infantry Regiment, two battalions	0
Field Marshal; William Beresford	7th Division; Major General; George Townshend Walker	5,643	Colonel; John Milley Doyle	2,358	2nd Caçadores Battalion	3
Lieutenant General; Thomas Picton	3rd Division; Lieutenant General; Thomas Picton	6,626	Major General; Thomas Brisbane	2,491	1st Battalion/45th Infantry Regiment	132
Lieutenant General; Thomas Picton	3rd Division; Lieutenant General; Thomas Picton	6,626	Major General; Thomas Brisbane	2,491	5th Battalion/60th Infantry Regiment	42
Lieutenant General; Thomas Picton	3rd Division; Lieutenant General; Thomas Picton	6,626	Major General; Thomas Brisbane	2,491	74th Infantry Regiment	34
Lieutenant General; Thomas Picton	3rd Division; Lieutenant General; Thomas Picton	6,626	Major General; Thomas Brisbane	2,491	1st Battalion/88th Infantry Regiment	269
Lieutenant General; Thomas Picton	3rd Division; Lieutenant General; Thomas Picton	6,626	Major General; John Keane	2,006	1st Battalion/5th Infantry Regiment	40
Lieutenant General; Thomas Picton	3rd Division; Lieutenant General; Thomas Picton	6,626	Major General; John Keane	2,006	2nd Battalion/83rd Infantry Regiment	58
Lieutenant General; Thomas Picton	3rd Division; Lieutenant General; Thomas Picton	6,626	Major General; John Keane	2,006	2nd Battalion/87th Infantry Regiment	109
Lieutenant General; Thomas Picton	3rd Division; Lieutenant General; Thomas Picton	6,626	Major General; John Keane	2,006	94th Infantry Regiment	15
Lieutenant General; Thomas Picton	3rd Division; Lieutenant General; Thomas Picton	6,626	Colonel; Manley Power	2,129	9th Port. Infantry Regiment, two battalions	49
Lieutenant General; Thomas Picton	3rd Division; Lieutenant General; Thomas Picton	6,626	Colonel; Manley Power	2,129	21st Port. Infantry Regiment, two battalions	37
Lieutenant General; Thomas Picton	3rd Division; Lieutenant General; Thomas Picton	6,626	Colonel; Manley Power	2,129	11th Caçadores Battalion	23
Lieutenant General; Thomas Picton	6th Division; Lieutenant General; Henry Clinton	5,571	Major General; Denis Pack	1,415	1st Battalion/42nd Infantry Regiment	60
Lieutenant General; Thomas Picton	6th Division; Lieutenant General; Henry Clinton	5,571	Major General; Denis Pack	1,415	1st Battalion/79th Infantry Regiment	absent
Lieutenant General; Thomas Picton	6th Division; Lieutenant General; Henry Clinton	5,571	Major General; Denis Pack	1,415	1st Battalion/91st Infantry Regiment	12
Lieutenant General; Thomas Picton	6th Division; Lieutenant General; Henry Clinton	5,571	Major General; John Lambert	2,300	1st Battalion/11th Infantry Regiment	0
Lieutenant General; Thomas Picton	6th Division; Lieutenant General; Henry Clinton	5,571	Major General; John Lambert	2,300	1st Battalion/32nd Infantry Regiment	0
Lieutenant General; Thomas Picton	6th Division; Lieutenant General; Henry Clinton	5,571	Major General; John Lambert	2,300	1st Battalion/36th Infantry Regiment	0
Lieutenant General; Thomas Picton	6th Division; Lieutenant General; Henry Clinton	5,571	Major General; John Lambert	2,300	1st Battalion/61st Infantry Regiment	7
Lieutenant General; Thomas Picton	6th Division; Lieutenant General; Henry Clinton	5,571	Colonel; James Douglas	1,856	8th Port. Infantry Regiment, two battalions	9
Lieutenant General; Thomas Picton	6th Division; Lieutenant General; Henry Clinton	5,571	Colonel; James Douglas	1,856	12th Port. Infantry Regiment, two battalions	5
Lieutenant General; Thomas Picton	6th Division; Lieutenant General; Henry Clinton	5,571	Colonel; James Douglas	1,856	9th Caçadores Battalion	10
Lieutenant General; Rowland Hill	2nd Division; Lieutenant General; William Stewart	7,780	Major General; Edward Barnes	2,013	1st Battalion/50th Infantry Regiment	14
Lieutenant General; Rowland Hill	2nd Division; Lieutenant General; William Stewart	7,780	Major General; Edward Barnes	2,013	1st Battalion/71st Infantry Regiment	12
Lieutenant General; Rowland Hill	2nd Division; Lieutenant General; William Stewart	7,780	Major General; Edward Barnes	2,013	1st Battalion/92nd Infantry Regiment	3
Lieutenant General; Rowland Hill	2nd Division; Lieutenant General; William Stewart	7,780	Major General; John Byng	1,805	1st Battalion/3rd Infantry Regiment	2
Lieutenant General; Rowland Hill	2nd Division; Lieutenant General; William Stewart	7,780	Major General; John Byng	1,805	1st Battalion/57th Infantry Regiment	0
Lieutenant General; Rowland Hill	2nd Division; Lieutenant General; William Stewart	7,780	Major General; John Byng	1,805	2nd Battalion/31st Infantry Regiment	2
Lieutenant General; Rowland Hill	2nd Division; Lieutenant General; William Stewart	7,780	Major General; John Byng	1,805	1st Battalion/66th Infantry Regiment	0
Lieutenant General; Rowland Hill	2nd Division; Lieutenant General; William Stewart	7,780	Colonel; Robert O'Callaghan	1,664	1st Battalion/28th Infantry Regiment	0
Lieutenant General; Rowland Hill	2nd Division; Lieutenant General; William Stewart	7,780	Colonel; Robert O'Callaghan	1,664	2nd Battalion/34th Infantry Regiment	0
Lieutenant General; Rowland Hill	2nd Division; Lieutenant General; William Stewart	7,780	Colonel; Robert O'Callaghan	1,664	1st Battalion/39th Infantry Regiment	0
Lieutenant General; Rowland Hill	2nd Division; Lieutenant General; William Stewart	7,780	Colonel; Henry Hardinge	1,856	6th Port. Infantry Regiment, two battalions	0
Lieutenant General; Rowland Hill	2nd Division; Lieutenant General; William Stewart	7,780	Colonel; Henry Hardinge	1,856	18th Port. Infantry Regiment, two battalions	0
Lieutenant General; Rowland Hill	2nd Division; Lieutenant General; William Stewart	7,780	Colonel; Henry Hardinge	1,856	6th Caçadores Battalion	0
Lieutenant General; Rowland Hill	Portuguese Division; Major General; Carlos Frederico Lecor	4,465	Brigadier General; Hippolita Da Costa	2,109	2nd Port. Infantry Regiment, two battalions	3
Lieutenant General; Rowland Hill	Portuguese Division; Major General; Carlos Frederico Lecor	4,465	Brigadier General; Hippolita Da Costa	2,109	14th Port. Infantry Regiment, two battalions	0
Lieutenant General; Rowland Hill	Portuguese Division; Major General; Carlos Frederico Lecor	4,465	Brigadier General; John Buchan	2,356	4th Port. Infantry Regiment, two battalions	1
Lieutenant General; Rowland Hill	Portuguese Division; Major General; Carlos Frederico Lecor	4,465	Brigadier General; John Buchan	2,356	10th Port. Infantry Regiment, two battalions	1
Lieutenant General; Rowland Hill	Portuguese Division; Major General; Carlos Frederico Lecor	4,465	Brigadier General; John Buchan	2,356	10th Caçadores Battalion	10
Reserve	Light Division; Major General; Charles, Count Alten (Note: Light Division organization is taken from Glover (2001) p. 383. Strength and losses are from Smith.)	3,480	Major General; James Kempt	British total 1,777	1st Battalion/43rd Infantry Regiment	absent
Reserve	Light Division; Major General; Charles, Count Alten	3,480	Major General; James Kempt	British total 1,777	1st Battalion/95th Infantry Regiment	absent
Reserve	Light Division; Major General; Charles, Count Alten	3,480	Major General; James Kempt	British total 1,777	3rd Battalion/95th Infantry Regiment	0
Reserve	Light Division; Major General; Charles, Count Alten	3,480	Major General; James Kempt	British total 1,777	3rd Caçadores Battalion	26
Reserve	Light Division; Major General; Charles, Count Alten	3,480	Major General; John Ormsby Vandeleur	Port. total 1,703	1st Battalion/52nd Infantry Regiment	89
Reserve	Light Division; Major General; Charles, Count Alten	3,480	Major General; John Ormsby Vandeleur	Port. total 1,703	2nd Battalion/95th Infantry Regiment	0
Reserve	Light Division; Major General; Charles, Count Alten	3,480	Major General; John Ormsby Vandeleur	Port. total 1,703	17th Port. Infantry Regiment	0
Reserve	Light Division; Major General; Charles, Count Alten	3,480	Major General; John Ormsby Vandeleur	Port. total 1,703	1st Caçadores Battalion	47
Cavalry	Cavalry Division; Lieutenant General; Stapleton Cotton	3,373	Major General; Edward Somerset	1,619	7th Hussar Regiment	16
Cavalry	Cavalry Division; Lieutenant General; Stapleton Cotton	3,373	Major General; Edward Somerset	1,619	10th Hussar Regiment	1
Cavalry	Cavalry Division; Lieutenant General; Stapleton Cotton	3,373	Major General; Edward Somerset	1,619	15th Hussar Regiment	9
Cavalry	Cavalry Division; Lieutenant General; Stapleton Cotton	3,373	Major General; Hussey Vivian	989	18th Hussar Regiment	0
Cavalry	Cavalry Division; Lieutenant General; Stapleton Cotton	3,373	Major General; Hussey Vivian	989	1st Hussar Regiment, King's German Legion	0
Cavalry	Cavalry Division; Lieutenant General; Stapleton Cotton	3,373	Major General; Henry Fane	765	13th Light Dragoon Regiment	9
Cavalry	Cavalry Division; Lieutenant General; Stapleton Cotton	3,373	Major General; Henry Fane	765	14th Light Dragoon Regiment	2
Artillery	Not given	1,162; 54 guns	Not given	1,162; 54 guns	6 British Batteries	28
Artillery	Not given	1,162; 54 guns	Not given	1,162; 54 guns	1 King's German Legion Battery	0
Artillery	Not given	1,162; 54 guns	Not given	1,162; 54 guns	1 Portuguese Battery	0
Engineers, etc.	Not given	350	Not given	350	Staff	6
Engineers, etc.	Not given	350	Not given	350	Engineers	2
Engineers, etc.	Not given	350	Not given	350	Wagon drivers	0
Total strength and casualties	Allied strength:	44,402	By nationality:	26,798	British	1,645
Total strength and casualties	Allied strength:	44,402	By nationality:	17,604	Portuguese	529

=== French Army ===
Marshal Jean de Dieu Soult's Army at Orthez
Corps	Division	Strength	Losses	Brigade	Units
General of Division; Honoré Charles Reille	5th Division; General of Brigade; Claude Pierre Rouget vice General of Division; Jean-Pierre Maransin	3,717	521	General of Brigade; Étienne de Barbot	4th Light Infantry Regiment, one battalion
General of Division; Honoré Charles Reille	5th Division; General of Brigade; Claude Pierre Rouget vice General of Division; Jean-Pierre Maransin	3,717	521	General of Brigade; Étienne de Barbot	40th Line Infantry Regiment, two battalions
General of Division; Honoré Charles Reille	5th Division; General of Brigade; Claude Pierre Rouget vice General of Division; Jean-Pierre Maransin	3,717	521	General of Brigade; Étienne de Barbot	50th Line Infantry Regiment, one battalion
General of Division; Honoré Charles Reille	5th Division; General of Brigade; Claude Pierre Rouget vice General of Division; Jean-Pierre Maransin	3,717	521	General of Brigade; Claude Pierre Rouget	27th Line Infantry Regiment, one battalion
General of Division; Honoré Charles Reille	5th Division; General of Brigade; Claude Pierre Rouget vice General of Division; Jean-Pierre Maransin	3,717	521	General of Brigade; Claude Pierre Rouget	34th Line Infantry Regiment, one battalion
General of Division; Honoré Charles Reille	5th Division; General of Brigade; Claude Pierre Rouget vice General of Division; Jean-Pierre Maransin	3,717	521	General of Brigade; Claude Pierre Rouget	59th Line Infantry Regiment, one battalion
General of Division; Honoré Charles Reille	4th Division; General of Division; Eloi Charlemagne Taupin	5,455	591	General of Brigade; Jean-Pierre-Antoine Rey	12th Light Infantry Regiment, two battalions
General of Division; Honoré Charles Reille	4th Division; General of Division; Eloi Charlemagne Taupin	5,455	591	General of Brigade; Jean-Pierre-Antoine Rey	32nd Line Infantry Regiment, two battalions
General of Division; Honoré Charles Reille	4th Division; General of Division; Eloi Charlemagne Taupin	5,455	591	General of Brigade; Jean-Pierre-Antoine Rey	43rd Line Infantry Regiment, two battalions
General of Division; Honoré Charles Reille	4th Division; General of Division; Eloi Charlemagne Taupin	5,455	591	General of Brigade; Joseph Gasquet	47th Line Infantry Regiment, two battalions
General of Division; Honoré Charles Reille	4th Division; General of Division; Eloi Charlemagne Taupin	5,455	591	General of Brigade; Joseph Gasquet	55th Line Infantry Regiment, one battalion
General of Division; Honoré Charles Reille	4th Division; General of Division; Eloi Charlemagne Taupin	5,455	591	General of Brigade; Joseph Gasquet	58th Line Infantry Regiment, one battalion
General of Division; Honoré Charles Reille	Detached from Harispe	Not given	448	General of Brigade; Marie Auguste Paris (Note: Smith gave separate casualties for Paris' brigade, but did not list its strength or composition in Smith (1998) pp. 500–501. Paris' units come from Smith (1998) p. 483. They are removed from Baurot's brigade of Harispe, which was credited with seven battalions on p. 500.)	10th Line Infantry Regiment, two battalions
General of Division; Honoré Charles Reille	Detached from Harispe	Not given	448	General of Brigade; Marie Auguste Paris	81st Line Infantry Regiment, one battalion
General of Division; Honoré Charles Reille	Detached from Harispe	Not given	448	General of Brigade; Marie Auguste Paris	115th Line Infantry Regiment, one battalion
General of Division; Jean-Baptiste Drouet, comte d'Erlon	1st Division; General of Division; Maximilien Sébastien Foy (WIA)	3,839	349	General of Brigade; Joseph François Fririon	6th Light Infantry Regiment, one battalion
General of Division; Jean-Baptiste Drouet, comte d'Erlon	1st Division; General of Division; Maximilien Sébastien Foy (WIA)	3,839	349	General of Brigade; Joseph François Fririon	69th Line Infantry Regiment, two battalions
General of Division; Jean-Baptiste Drouet, comte d'Erlon	1st Division; General of Division; Maximilien Sébastien Foy (WIA)	3,839	349	General of Brigade; Joseph François Fririon	76th Line Infantry Regiment, one battalion
General of Division; Jean-Baptiste Drouet, comte d'Erlon	1st Division; General of Division; Maximilien Sébastien Foy (WIA)	3,839	349	General of Brigade; Pierre André Hercule Berlier	36th Line Infantry Regiment, two battalions
General of Division; Jean-Baptiste Drouet, comte d'Erlon	1st Division; General of Division; Maximilien Sébastien Foy (WIA)	3,839	349	General of Brigade; Pierre André Hercule Berlier	39th Line Infantry Regiment, one battalion
General of Division; Jean-Baptiste Drouet, comte d'Erlon	1st Division; General of Division; Maximilien Sébastien Foy (WIA)	3,839	349	General of Brigade; Pierre André Hercule Berlier	65th Line Infantry Regiment, two battalions
General of Division; Jean-Baptiste Drouet, comte d'Erlon	2nd Division; General of Division; Jean Barthélemy Darmagnac	5,022	566	General of Brigade; Louis Jean-Baptiste Leseur	31st Light Infantry Regiment, two battalions
General of Division; Jean-Baptiste Drouet, comte d'Erlon	2nd Division; General of Division; Jean Barthélemy Darmagnac	5,022	566	General of Brigade; Louis Jean-Baptiste Leseur	51st Line Infantry Regiment, one battalion
General of Division; Jean-Baptiste Drouet, comte d'Erlon	2nd Division; General of Division; Jean Barthélemy Darmagnac	5,022	566	General of Brigade; Louis Jean-Baptiste Leseur	75th Line Infantry Regiment, two battalions
General of Division; Jean-Baptiste Drouet, comte d'Erlon	2nd Division; General of Division; Jean Barthélemy Darmagnac	5,022	566	General of Brigade; Jean-Baptiste Pierre Menne	118th Line Infantry Regiment, three battalions
General of Division; Jean-Baptiste Drouet, comte d'Erlon	2nd Division; General of Division; Jean Barthélemy Darmagnac	5,022	566	General of Brigade; Jean-Baptiste Pierre Menne	120th Line Infantry Regiment, three battalions
General of Division; Bertrand Clausel	6th Division; General of Division; Eugène-Casimir Villatte	4,609	339	General of Brigade; Louis Paul Baille de Saint Pol	21st Light Infantry Regiment, one battalion
General of Division; Bertrand Clausel	6th Division; General of Division; Eugène-Casimir Villatte	4,609	339	General of Brigade; Louis Paul Baille de Saint Pol	86th Line Infantry Regiment, one battalion
General of Division; Bertrand Clausel	6th Division; General of Division; Eugène-Casimir Villatte	4,609	339	General of Brigade; Louis Paul Baille de Saint Pol	96th Line Infantry Regiment, one battalion
General of Division; Bertrand Clausel	6th Division; General of Division; Eugène-Casimir Villatte	4,609	339	General of Brigade; Louis Paul Baille de Saint Pol	100th Line Infantry Regiment, one battalion
General of Division; Bertrand Clausel	6th Division; General of Division; Eugène-Casimir Villatte	4,609	339	General of Brigade; Étienne-François Lamorendière	28th Light Infantry Regiment, one battalion
General of Division; Bertrand Clausel	6th Division; General of Division; Eugène-Casimir Villatte	4,609	339	General of Brigade; Étienne-François Lamorendière	103rd Line Infantry Regiment, two battalions
General of Division; Bertrand Clausel	6th Division; General of Division; Eugène-Casimir Villatte	4,609	339	General of Brigade; Étienne-François Lamorendière	119th Line Infantry Regiment, two battalions
General of Division; Bertrand Clausel	8th Division; General of Division; Jean Isidore Harispe	5,084	834	General of Brigade; Guilhem Dauture	9th Light Infantry Regiment, two battalions
General of Division; Bertrand Clausel	8th Division; General of Division; Jean Isidore Harispe	5,084	834	General of Brigade; Guilhem Dauture	25th Light Infantry Regt., two battalions (at Lescar)
General of Division; Bertrand Clausel	8th Division; General of Division; Jean Isidore Harispe	5,084	834	General of Brigade; Guilhem Dauture	34th Light Infantry Regiment, two battalions
General of Division; Bertrand Clausel	8th Division; General of Division; Jean Isidore Harispe	5,084	834	General of Brigade; Jean-Baptiste Charles Baurot	45th Line Infantry Regiment, one battalion
General of Division; Bertrand Clausel	8th Division; General of Division; Jean Isidore Harispe	5,084	834	General of Brigade; Jean-Baptiste Charles Baurot	115th Line Infantry Regiment, one battalion
General of Division; Bertrand Clausel	8th Division; General of Division; Jean Isidore Harispe	5,084	834	General of Brigade; Jean-Baptiste Charles Baurot	116th Line Infantry Regiment, one battalion
Cavalry	General of Division; Pierre Benoît Soult (Note: French cavalry order of battle is listed under the Battle of Toulouse in Smith (1998) p. 518. For Orthez, Smith listed only seven squadrons from the 15th, 21st and 22nd Chasseurs.)	2,000	266	General of Brigade; Jean-Baptiste Breton	2nd Hussar Regiment (near Pau)
Cavalry	General of Division; Pierre Benoît Soult	2,000	266	General of Brigade; Jean-Baptiste Breton	13th Chasseurs-à-Cheval Regiment
Cavalry	General of Division; Pierre Benoît Soult	2,000	266	General of Brigade; Jean-Baptiste Breton	21st Chasseurs-à-Cheval Regiment
Cavalry	General of Division; Pierre Benoît Soult	2,000	266	General of Brigade; Jacques-Laurent Vial	5th Chasseurs-à-Cheval Regiment
Cavalry	General of Division; Pierre Benoît Soult	2,000	266	General of Brigade; Jacques-Laurent Vial	10th Chasseurs-à-Cheval Regiment
Cavalry	General of Division; Pierre Benoît Soult	2,000	266	General of Brigade; Jacques-Laurent Vial	15th Chasseurs-à-Cheval Regiment
Cavalry	General of Division; Pierre Benoît Soult	2,000	266	General of Brigade; Jacques-Laurent Vial	22nd Chasseurs-à-Cheval Regiment (at Pau)
Artillery	Not given	48 guns	59	Not given	Not given
Reserve	General of Division; Jean-Pierre Travot	7,267; 3,750	Not given	General of Brigade; Bernard Pourailly	"New conscript levies"
Reserve	General of Division; Jean-Pierre Travot	7,267; 3,750	Not given	General of Brigade; Armand Wouillemont de Vivier	"New conscript levies"
Total strength and casualties		34,993	3,985	6 guns were lost.	Losses include 8 staff officers and 4 sappers.

== Notes ==
Footnotes

Citations
