= Uzan (river) =

- Location within France Location within Nouvelle-Aquitaine

Location
- Country: France

Physical characteristics
- Source
  - location: Moor of Pont-Long
  - coordinates: 43°19′55″N 0°20′44″W
- Mouth
  - location: Luy de Béarn
  - coordinates: 43°28′50″N 0°29′44″W
- Length: 24 km (15 mi)

Basin features
- Progression: Luy de Béarn→ Luy→ Adour→ Atlantic Ocean

The Uzan, is a left tributary of the Luy de Béarn, in Uzan, Pyrénées-Atlantiques, in Southwestern France. It is 23.6 km (14.7 mi) long.

It rises in the moor of Pont-Long in the north of Pau. It flows into the Luy de Béarn downstream from the Aïgue Longue.
