= Aast, Pyrénées-Atlantiques =

Aast
- Commune
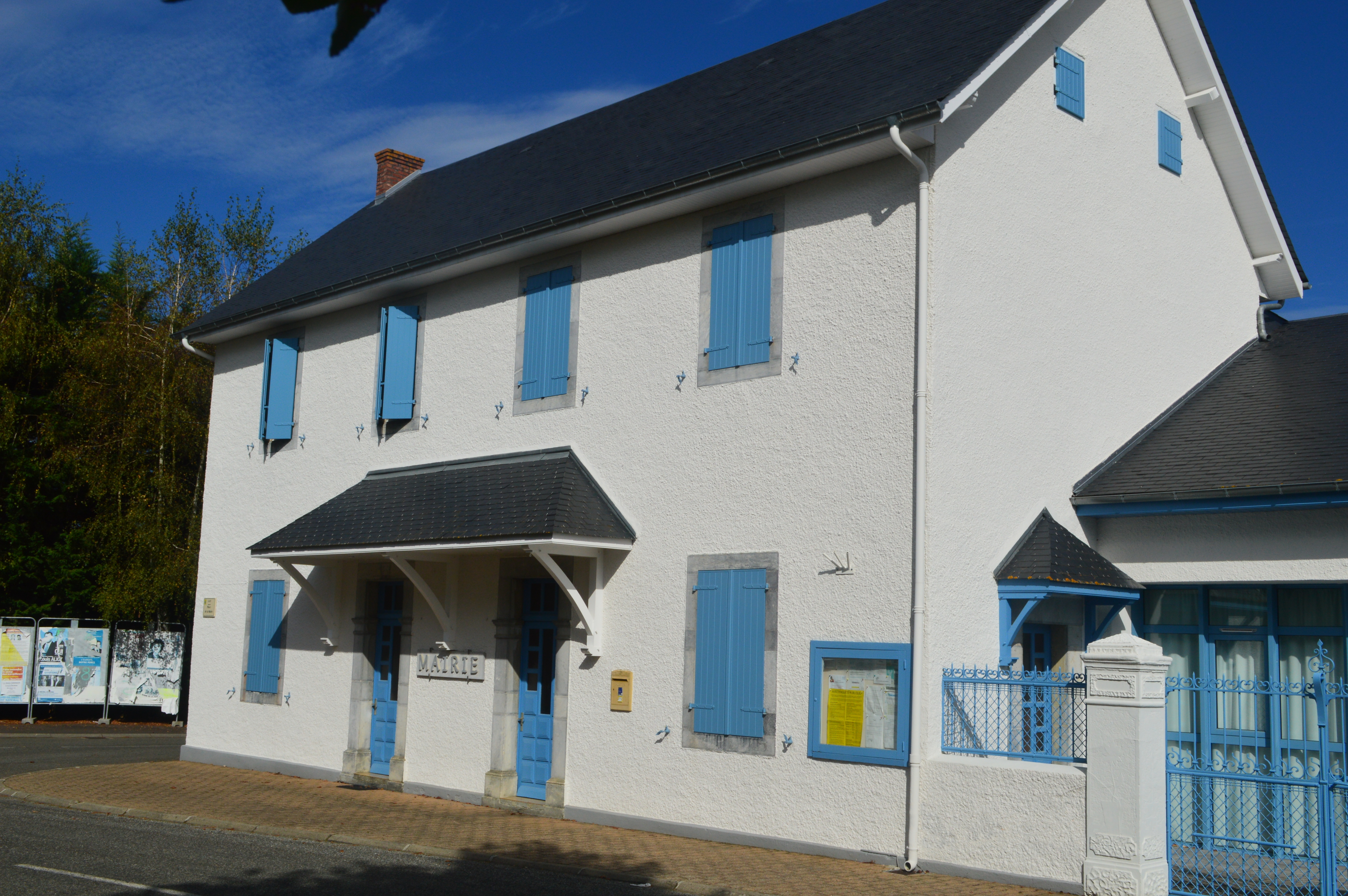
- Town hall

- Coat of arms
- Location of Aast
- Location within France Location within Nouvelle-Aquitaine
- Coordinates: 43°17′25″N 0°05′21″W
- Country: France
- Region: Nouvelle-Aquitaine
- Department: Pyrénées-Atlantiques
- Arrondissement: Pau
- Canton: Vallées de l'Ousse et du Lagoin
- Intercommunality: Nord-Est Béarn

Government
  - Mayor (2026–32): Loïc Hervé
- Area^{1}: 4.75 km^{2} (1.83 sq mi)
- Elevation: 390 m (1,280 ft)
- Highest elevation: 393 m (1,289 ft)
- Lowest elevation: 367 m (1,204 ft)
- Population (2023): 202
  - Density: 42.5/km^{2} (110/sq mi)
- Demonym(s): Aastais, Aastaises
- Time zone: UTC+01:00 (CET)
  - Summer (DST): UTC+02:00 (CEST)
- INSEE/Postal code: 64001 /64460
- ^{1} French Land Register data, which excludes lakes, ponds, glaciers > 1 km^{2} (0.386 sq mi or 247 acres) and river estuaries.

Aast (French pronunciation: [as(t)], locally [ɑ̃ːs]) is a commune in the Pyrénées-Atlantiques department in the Nouvelle-Aquitaine region in southwestern France. Aast is the first commune in France by alphabetical order.

== Geography ==
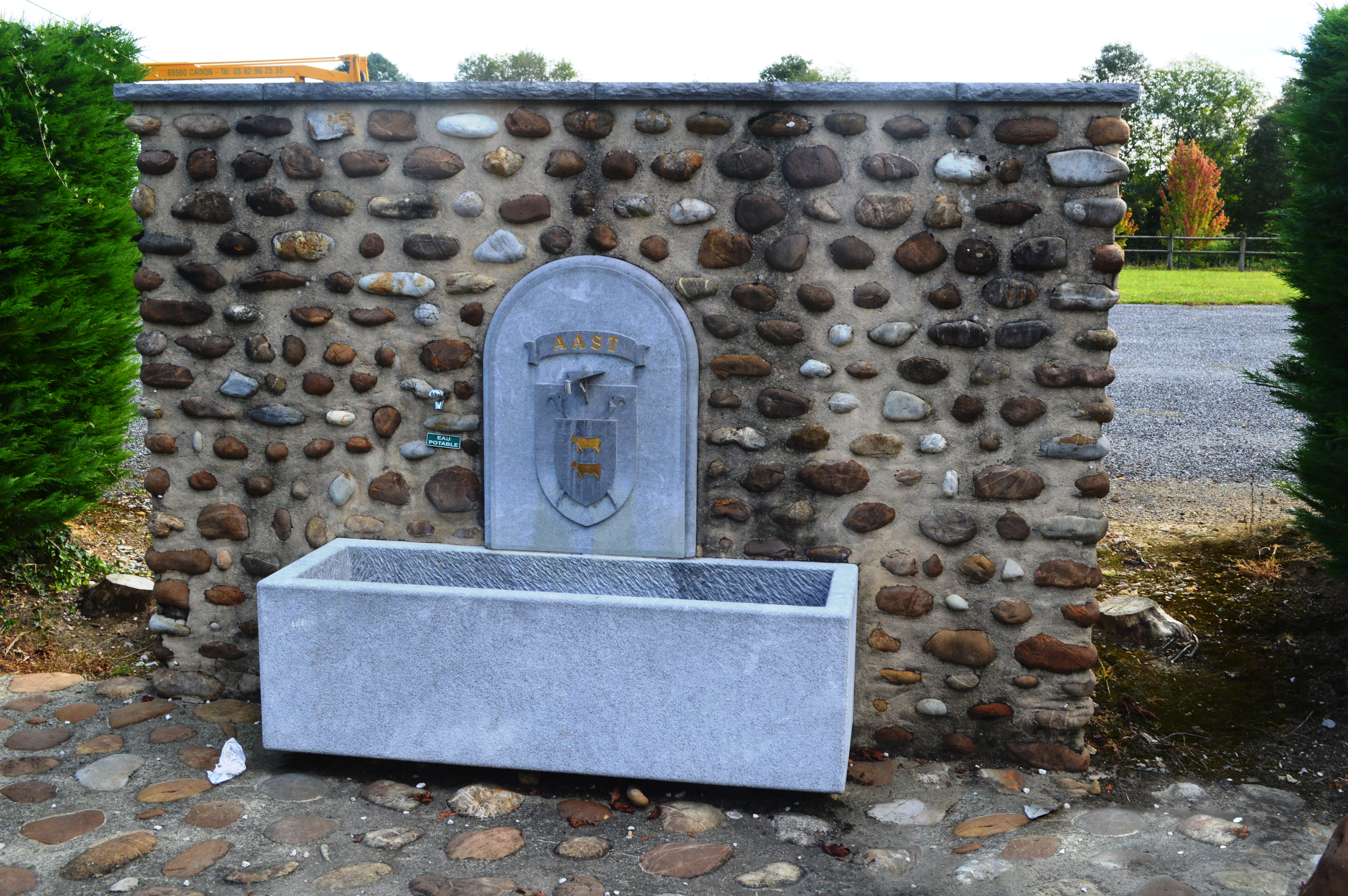
Aast Drinking Trough

=== Location ===
The village is situated on the plateau of Ger and is composed of a dozen scattered houses. Aast is 20 km east of Pau and 20 km north of Lourdes. Access to the commune is by road D70 then D311 north-east from Gardères, road D64 north-west from Ger, and road D311 when coming south from Ponson-Dessus. Other country roads can also be used to access the commune.

=== Hydrography ===
Located in the Drainage basin of the Adour, Aast is traversed by the Carbouère stream, a tributary of the Louet river.

=== Localities and hamlets ===
- Aast
- Bayet
- Bidou
- Cadet
- France
- Gachau
- Hourcade
- Lasbordes
- Lasserre
- Lassus
- Lescloupe
- Mouly
- Pouquet
- Rémy
- Toulou

== Toponymy ==
Aast is the first French commune in alphabetical order. Previously, Aas, another commune in the Lower Pyrenees, came first until 1861, when it merged with the commune of Assouste to form the new commune of Eaux-Bonnes.

The commune's Béarnais name is also Aast.

According to Dauzat and Rostaing Aast comes from the Basque ast ("rock"). This seems unlikely given the physical setting. Michel Grosclaude suggests that the name of the town derives from an anthroponym composed of Aner + Aster. Brigitte Jobbé-Duval recalls that in 1429, Aast appeared as Hast, which means lance, and therefore advanced the theory that Aast could refer to a battle that occurred there.

The following table details the origins of the commune name.

| Name | Spelling | Date | Source | Page | Origin | Description |
|---|---|---|---|---|---|---|
| Aast | Hast | 1429 | Raymond | 1 | Census | Village |
| | Ast | 1544 | Raymond | 1 | Reformation | |
| | Aast | 1750 | Cassini | | | |

Sources:

- Raymond: Topographic Dictionary of the Department of Basses-Pyrenees, 1863, on the page numbers indicated in the table. (in French)
- Cassini: Cassini Map from 1750

Origins:

- Census: Census of Montaner
- Reformation: Reformation of Béarn

== History ==
There was a Lay Abbey in Aast which was abolished in 1791. The Lordship of Aast was owned by the Day family from 1674 until the French Revolution. In 1678, Jérome de Day, adviser to the king, bought the abbey and tithes with rights of patronage: he was to provide a priest and entitled to receive a portion of the tithe, to sit in the choir, to be first to receive the blessed bread, and to be buried in the church.

== Heraldry ==
| Arms of Aast | Blazon: Argent, two halberds sable saltirewise with an inescutcheon gules with two cows collared and belled in Or passing one over the other debruised in fess point overall. |

== Administration ==
List of Successive Mayors of Aast

Mayors from the French Revolution to 1942

| From | To | Name |
|---|---|---|
| 1800 | 1802 | Jean Poublan |
| 1802 | 1806 | Matthieu Tisné |
| 1806 | 1820 | Jean Bidou |
| 1820 | 1822 | Michel Naude |
| 1822 | 1824 | Alexis Lassus |
| 1824 | 1828 | Michel Naude |
| 1828 | 1835 | Pierre Capdevielle |
| 1835 | 1837 | Alexis Lassus |
| 1837 | 1852 | Pierre Picourlat |
| 1852 | 1865 | Barthélémy Lassus |
| 1865 | 1871 | Jean Lassus (fils) |
| 1871 | 1881 | Jacques Tisné Daban |
| 1881 | 1889 | Jean Lasserre |
| 1889 | 1892 | Pierre Tisné Daban |
| 1892 | 1904 | Jean Lasserre |
| 1904 | 1919 | Jean Sarthou |
| 1919 | 1942 | Jacques Louis Lasserre |

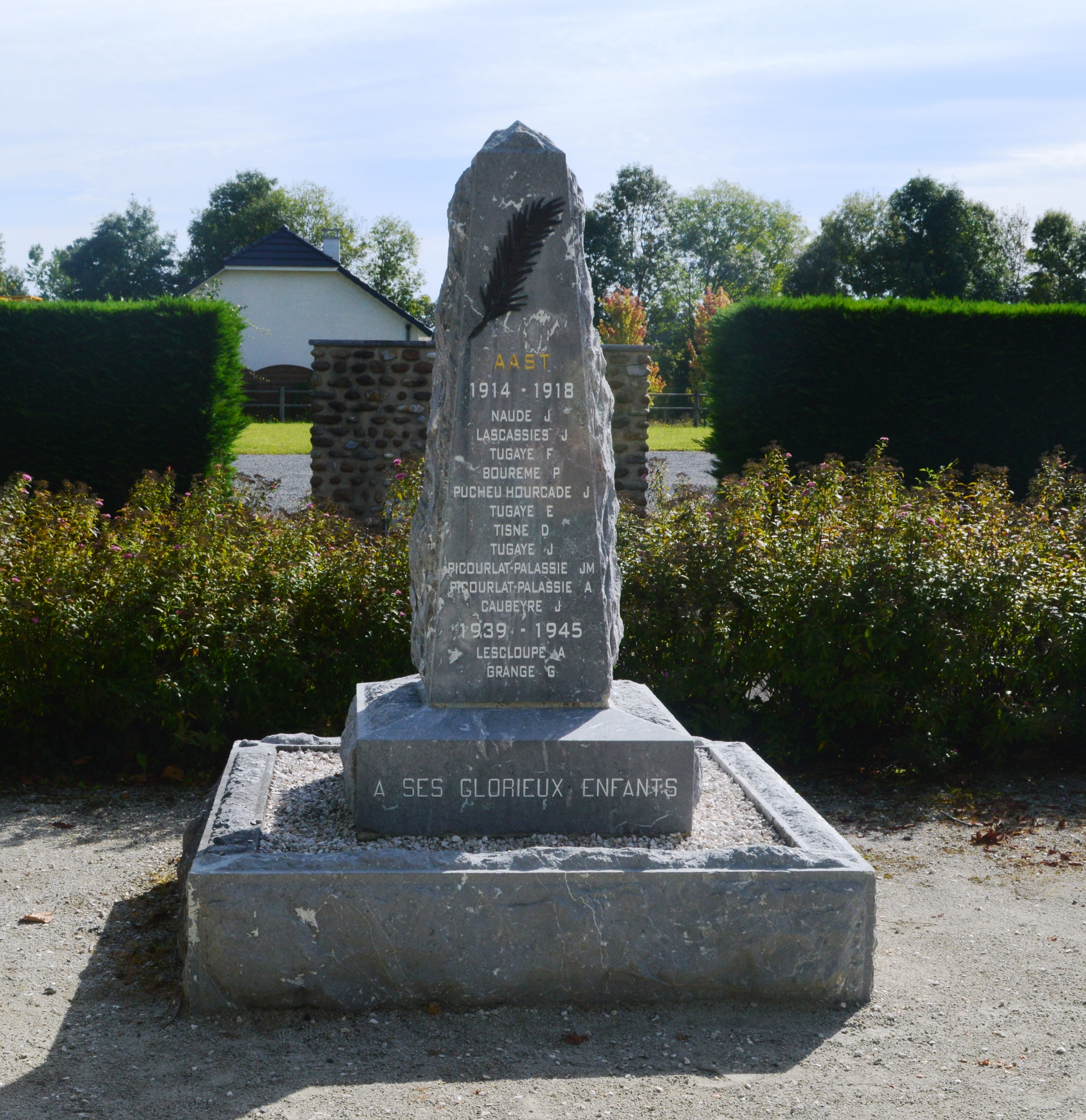
The Aast War Memorial

Mayors from 1942

| From | To | Name | Party | Position |
|---|---|---|---|---|
| 1942 | 1944 | Dominique Picourlat | | |
| 1944 | 1945 | Célestin Tisné Daban | | |
| 1945 | 1945 | Jean Sylvain Lascassies | | |
| 1945 | 1949 | Célestin Tisné Daban | | |
| 1949 | 1983 | Jean Lassus | | |
| 1983 | 2008 | Jean-Noël Lacourrège | RPR then UMP | General Councillor |
| 2008 | 2019 | Romain Morlanne | DVD | |
| 2020 | 2024 | Jean-François Garnier | | |
| 2024 | 2026 | Loïc Herve | | |

== Population ==
The inhabitants are known as Aastois(es) in French.

Historical population

| Year | Pop. | ±% p.a. |
|---|---|---|
| 1793 | 140 | — |
| 1821 | 173 | +0.76% |
| 1846 | 188 | +0.33% |
| 1872 | 213 | +0.48% |
| 1901 | 186 | −0.47% |
| 1926 | 167 | −0.43% |
| 1946 | 126 | −1.40% |
| 1962 | 140 | +0.66% |
| 1968 | 203 | +6.39% |

| Year | Pop. | ±% p.a. |
|---|---|---|
| 1975 | 115 | −7.80% |
| 1982 | 140 | +2.85% |
| 1990 | 163 | +1.92% |
| 1999 | 190 | +1.72% |
| 2007 | 181 | −0.60% |
| 2012 | 183 | +0.22% |
| 2017 | 181 | −0.22% |
| 2023 | 202 | +1.85% |

Source: EHESS (1793-1999) and INSEE

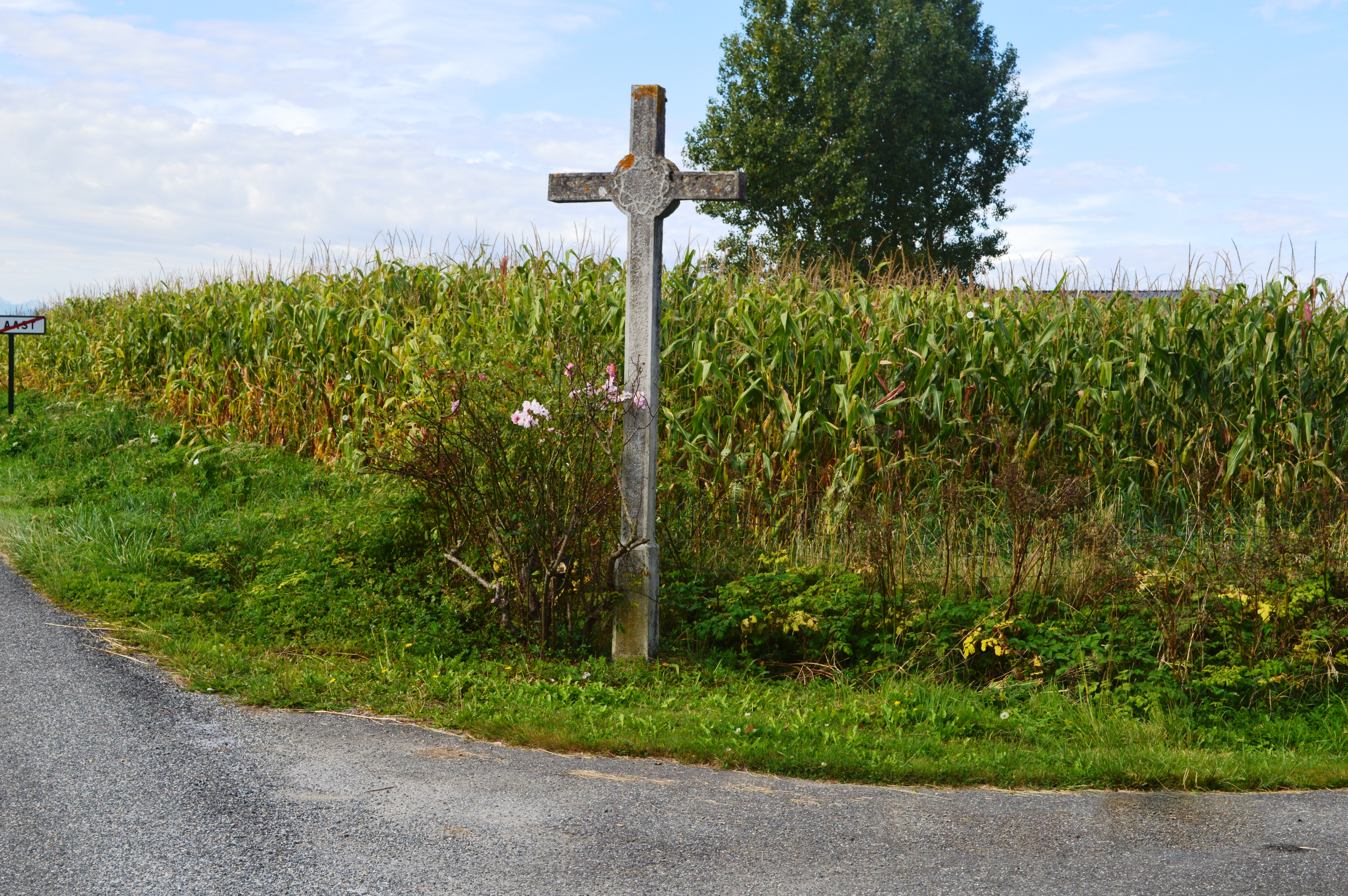
A Wayside Cross in Aast

== Culture and heritage ==
=== Civil heritage ===
The town has a number of old farmhouses:

- The Fray Farmhouse (17th century)
- A Farmhouse at Bayet (19th century)
- Houses and Farms (18th and 19th century)

=== Religious heritage ===
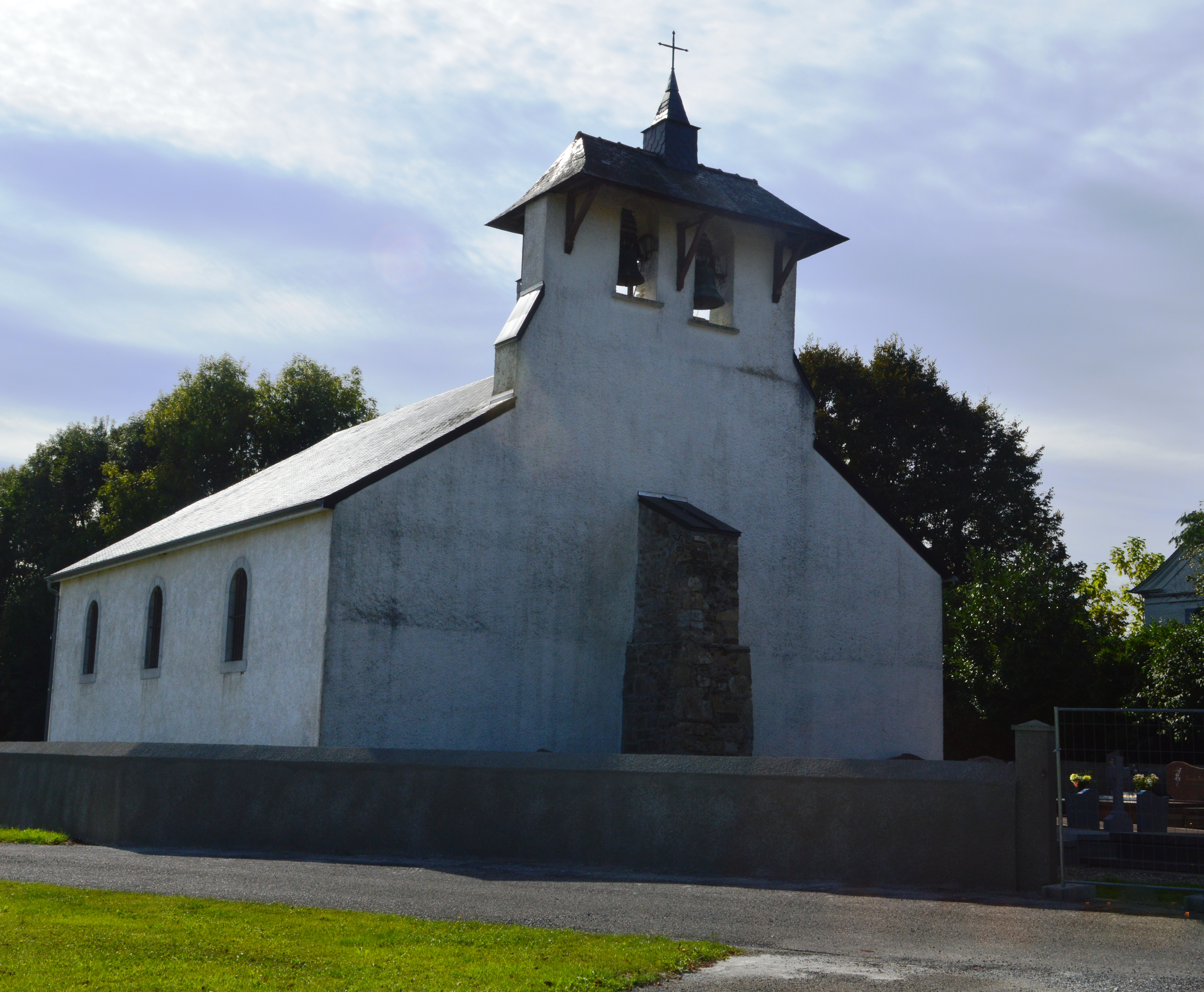
The Church of Saint Martin

The Church of Saint Martin (1854) dedicated to Saint Martin of Tours was built under Napoleon III during the administration of Mayor Bartholomew Lassus. Recently renovated by the artist Villarubias, there are many objects in the church registered as historical objects:

- A Processional Lantern (18th century)
- A Thurible (17th century)
- A Pail for holy water (19th century)
- A Painting: Christ on the cross with the Virgin, Saint Madeleine and Saint Martin (18th century)
- 2 Paintings: Saint Martin Bishop, and the Charity of St. Martin (19th century)
- Statue: Saint Joseph (19th century)
- Altar Pulpit (19th century)
- A Pulpit (18th century)
- 2 Altars and Tabernacles (19th century)
- The Main Altar (19th century)
- 5 stained glass windows by Henri Gesta (1927)
- The Furniture in the Church

== See also ==
- Communes of the Pyrénées-Atlantiques department
