= Gaujacq quarries narrow gauge railway =

Coordinates: 43.628306°N 0.762010°W

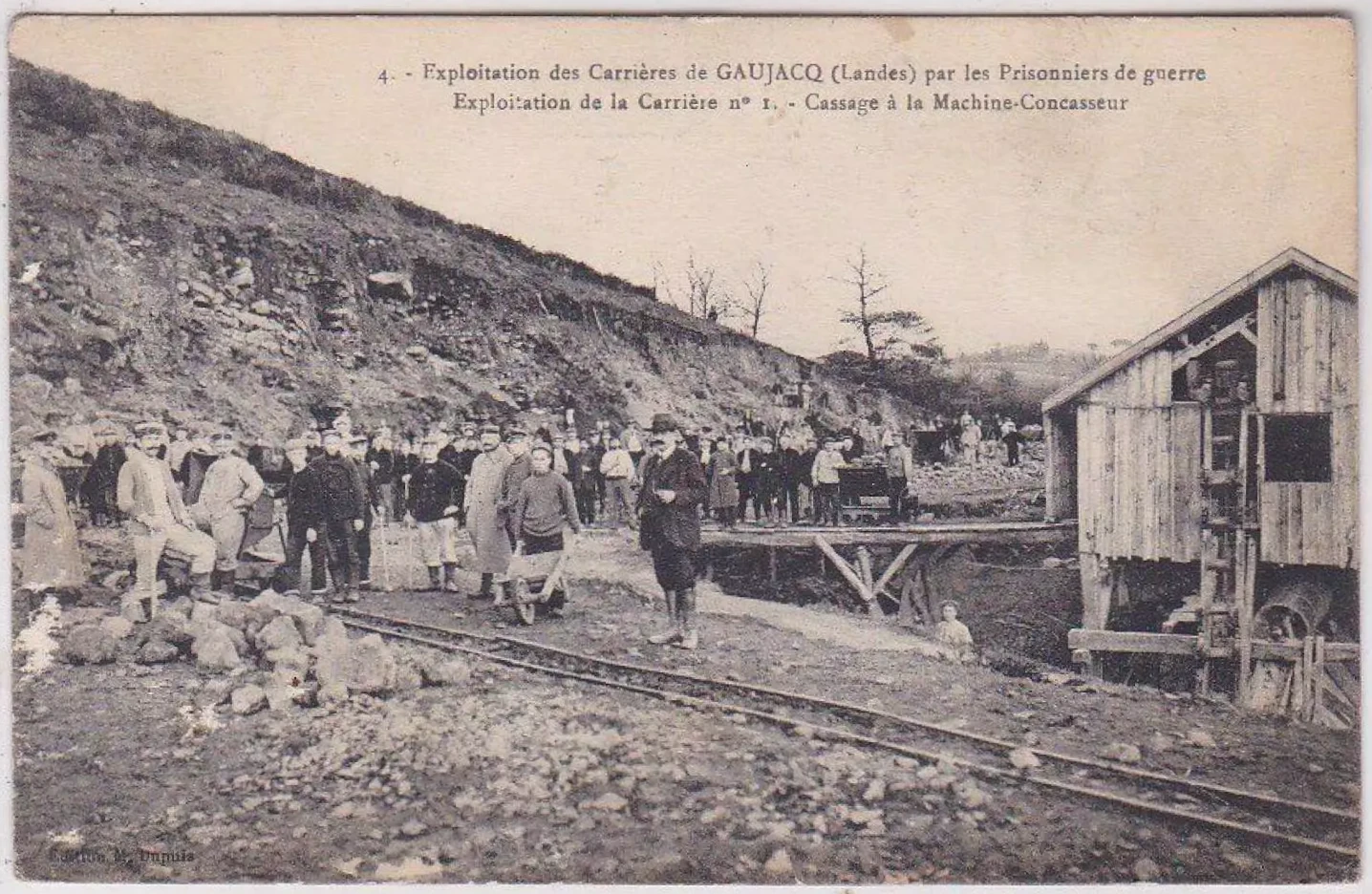
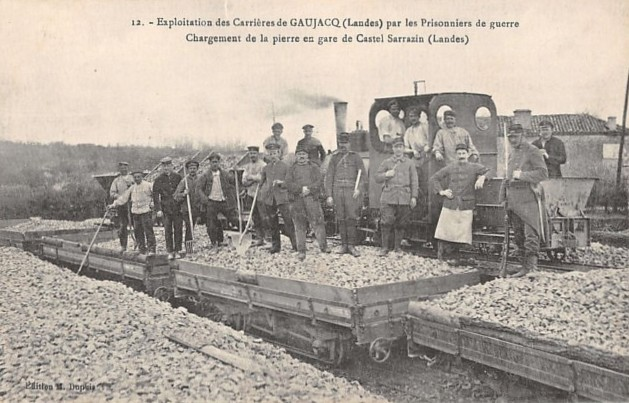
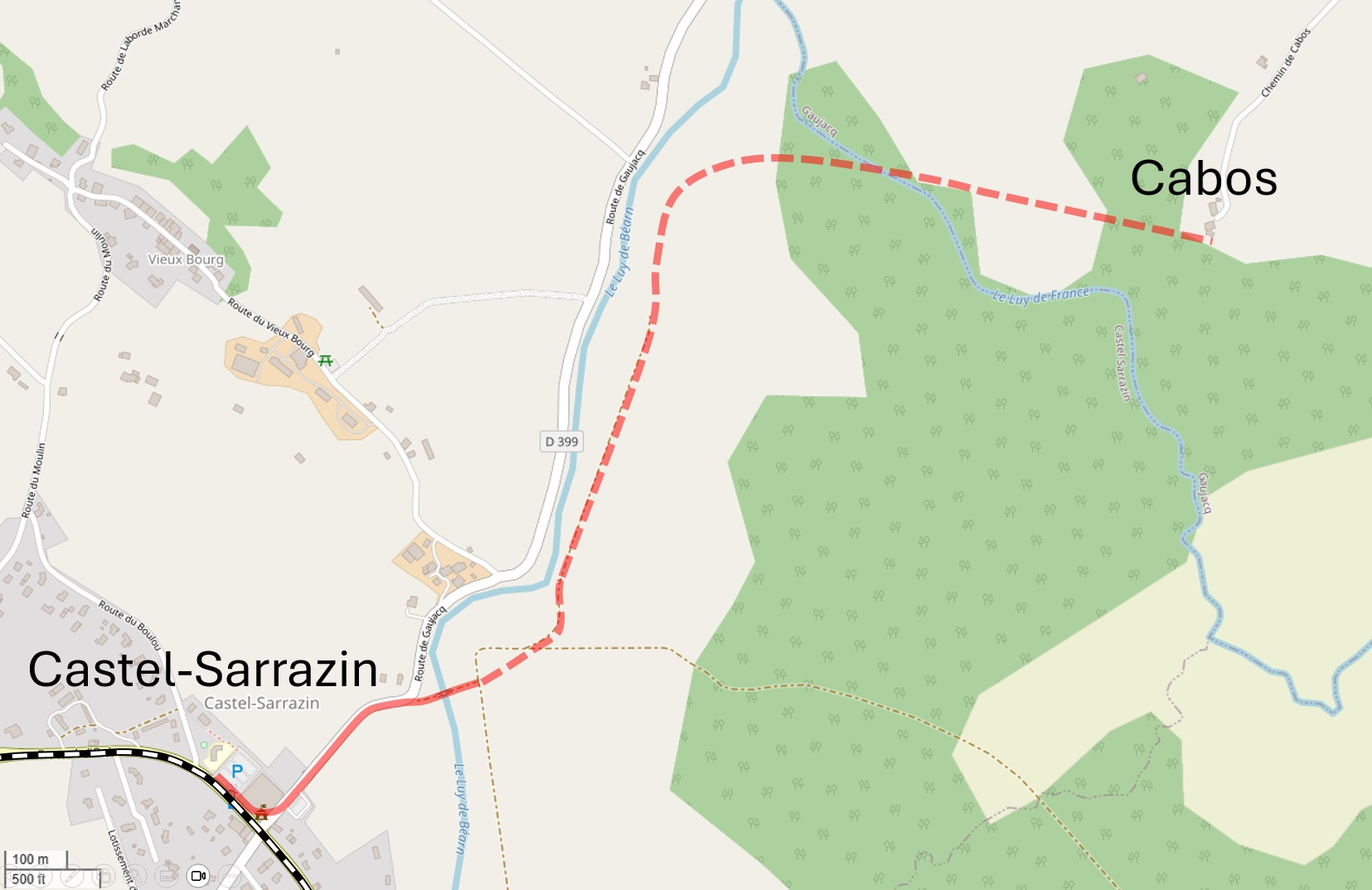
- Quarry No 1 – Filling of the mechanised crusher Transshipment from 600-mm-gauge V-skip-wagons to 1000-mm-gauge goods wagons Presumed route of the narrow gauge railway

Technical
- Line length: 2.25 km (1.40 mi)
- Track gauge: 600 mm (1 ft 11 5/8 in)

The Gaujacq quarries narrow gauge railway (French: Chemin de fer des carrières de Gaujacq) was an approximately 2.25 km (1.40 mi) long Decauville railway with a gauge of 600 mm (1 ft 11 5/8 in) from the quarries a Cabos near Gaujacq to Castel-Sarrazin.

== Route ==
The light railway line connected the quarries at Cabos to the south-east of Gaujacq Castle with Castel-Sarrazin tramway station, where the ballast extracted in the labour camp was transferred to the metre-gauge wagons on the Dax–Amou tramway line of the Compagnie des Tramways à Vapeur de la Chalosse et du Béarn (TVCB). The construction of the metre-gauge tracks in Dax had only been approved shortly before the World War I, on 3 June 1914. It was built by German prisoners during the war.

After being reloaded onto the goods wagons of the metre-gauge tramway, the ballast was transported to Dax-Midi railway station. There it was reloaded into the standard-gauge wagons of the Compagnie du Midi and sent to the front, where it was used for the ballasting of roads and railway tracks.

== History ==
The Moncaut ophite deposit was located near the Cabos farm below the Château de Gaujacq on land owned by Colonel François Henri Robert Jules Capdepoint (1864-1932). He had owned the Château de Gaujacq and the Thomas, Moncaut and Cabos dairies since 1906. He concluded a lease agreement with Gastion Blavet, an engineer from Dax, and Eugène Bautiaa, an entrepreneur from Pomarez, for the utilisation of the Moncaut quarry.

There were three quarries in total. The first two utilised the slope and each supplied a crusher. In the third quarry, the stone was extracted at the foot of the hill and crushed by hand.

After the Compagnie des Tramways à Vapeur de la Chalosse et du Béarn (C.B.) had inaugurated the metre-gauge tramway from Dax to Amou on 11 April 1909, the possibility of shipping gravel beyond the canton opened up. An application was therefore made, to lay a Decauville railway between the quarry and the hamlet of Lavie (municipality of Castel Sarrazin). However, the outbreak of war and the general mobilisation brought operations to a temporary standstill.

At the end of 1914, it was decided to set up a camp for German prisoners in Gaujacq. The first soldiers, the future guards, arrived in Gaujacq in April 1915. The first prisoners arrived the following month. By the end of the First World War, the camp housed around 600 prisoners. They had to exploit the quarry for three years. The camp was closed in mid-1918 and quarry operations ceased at the same time.

== Locomotives ==
At least one steam locomotive was used on the field railway, which was probably manufactured by Decauville, Borsig or Popineau.

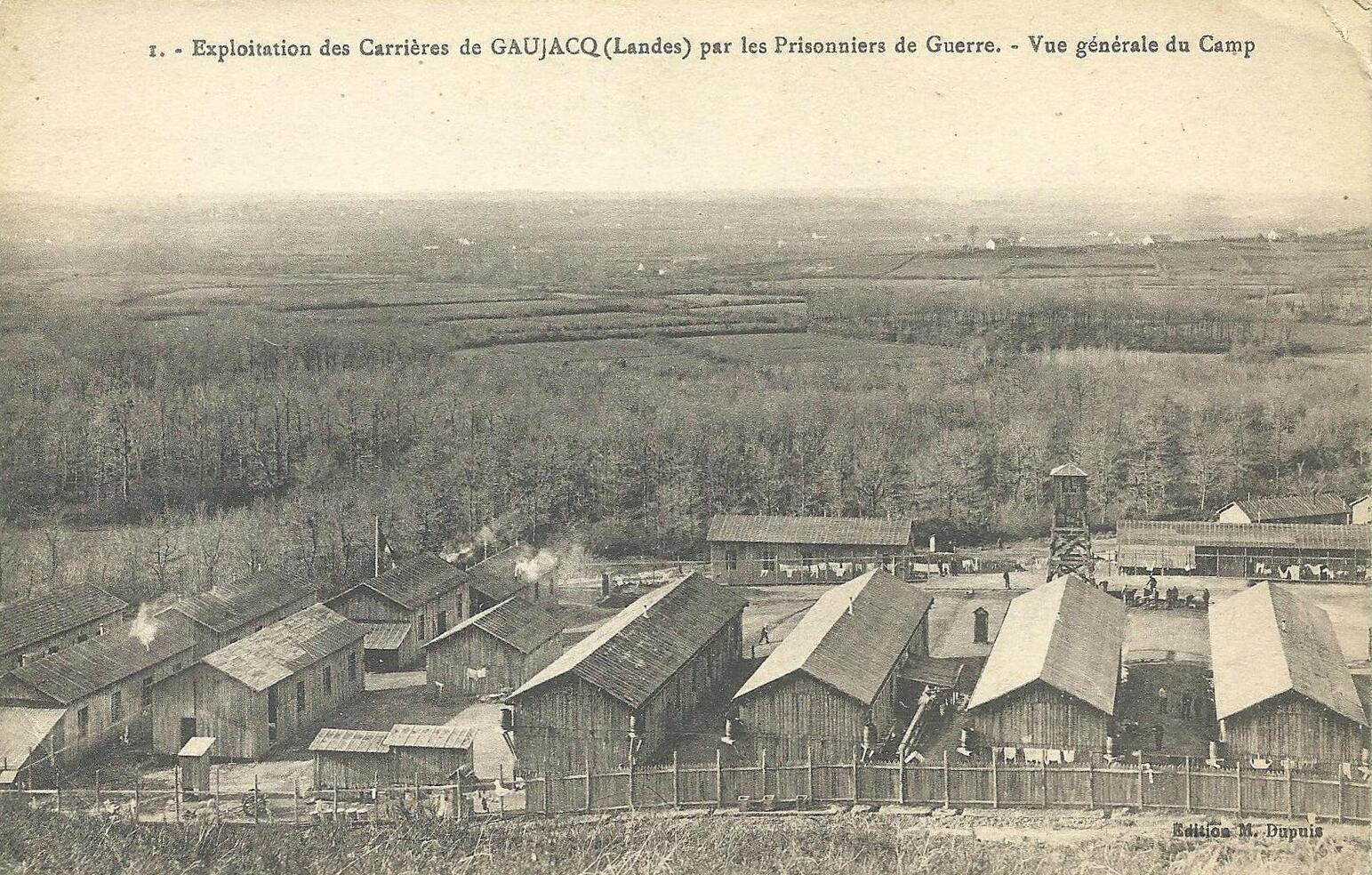
General view of the prisoner of war camp

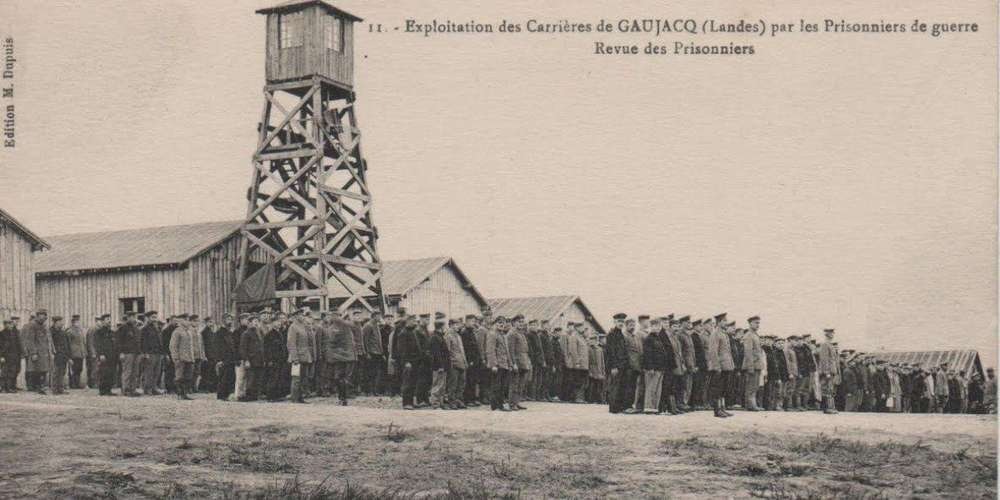
Lining up of the German prisoners of war

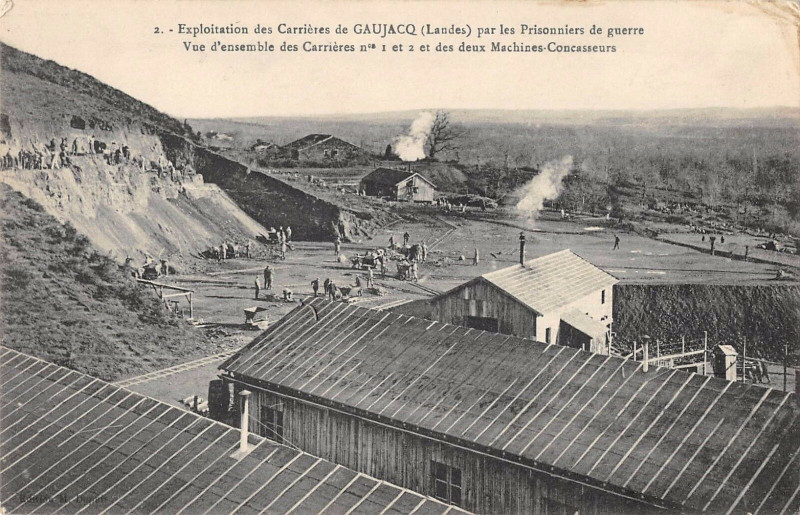
Quarries No. 1 and No. 2 and the two crushers

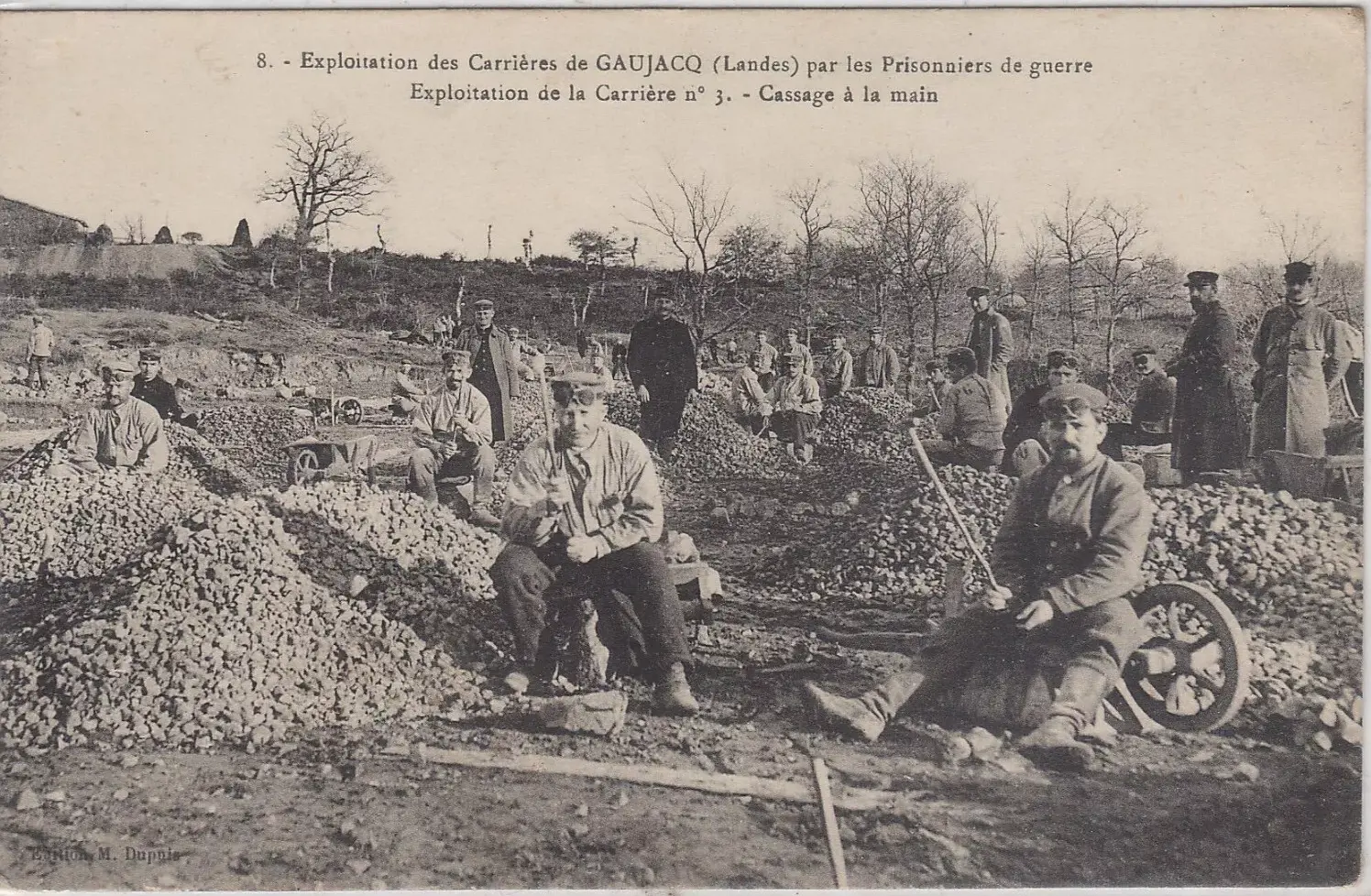
Quarry No. 3, manual crushing

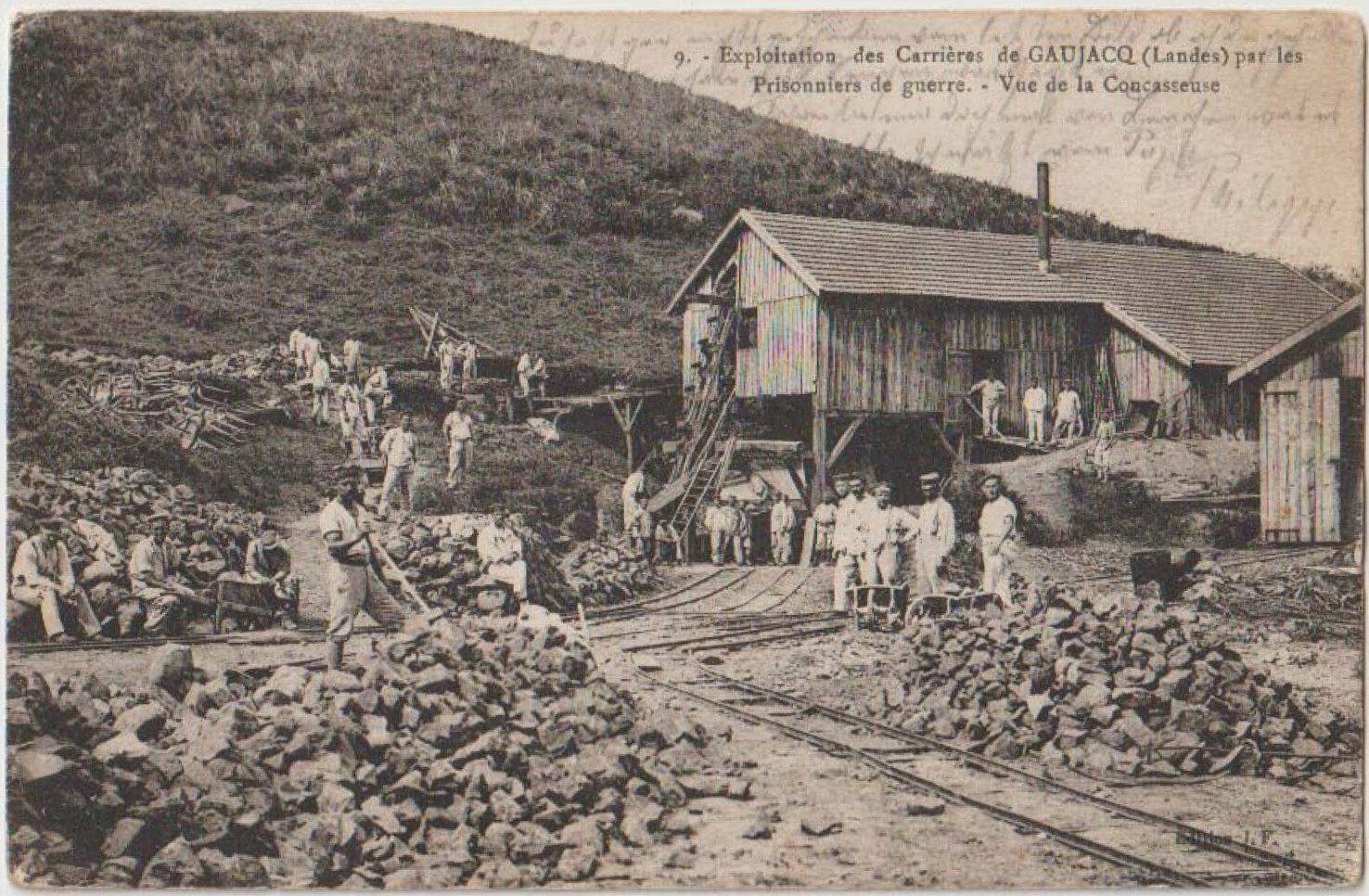
Loading the tipper lorries under the crusher

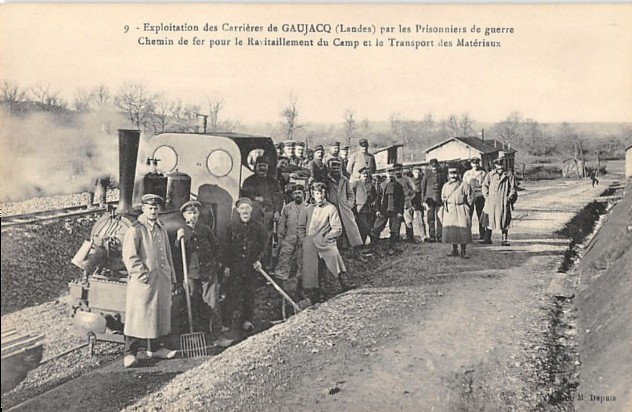
Gravel transport with the light railway

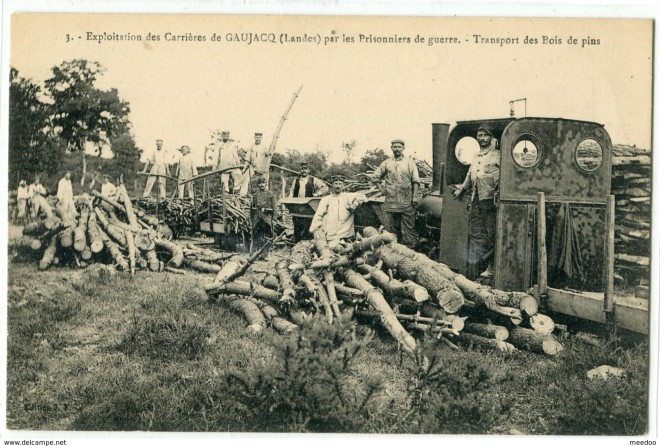
Firewood transport for the steam engines
