= Aïgue Longue =

- Location within France Location within Nouvelle-Aquitaine

Location
- Country: France

Physical characteristics
- Source
  - location: Moor of Pont-Long
- Mouth
  - location: Luy de Béarn
  - coordinates: 43°26′36″N 0°27′48″W
- Length: 24 km (15 mi)

Basin features
- Progression: Luy de Béarn→ Luy→ Adour→ Atlantic Ocean

The Aïgue Longue (French pronunciation: [aiɡ lɔ̃ɡ]; or Aygue Longue) is a left tributary of the Luy de Béarn, at Mazerolles, Pyrénées-Atlantiques, in the Southwest of France. It is 24.4 km (15.2 mi) long.

== Name ==
Its name means 'long water (stream)'.

== Geography ==
The Aïgue Longue rises in the moor of Pont-Long in the north of Pau. It flows through the lake of Uzein and joins the Luy de Béarn, 77 kilometres (48 mi) upstream from Mazerolles, Pyrénées-Atlantiques, in a parallel motion with the Uzan.

A dam near Mazerolles forms a reservoir named Lac de L'Aigue Longue.

== Main tributaries ==
- (L) Lata
- (R) Bruscos
