= Ponson-Dessus =

- Commune
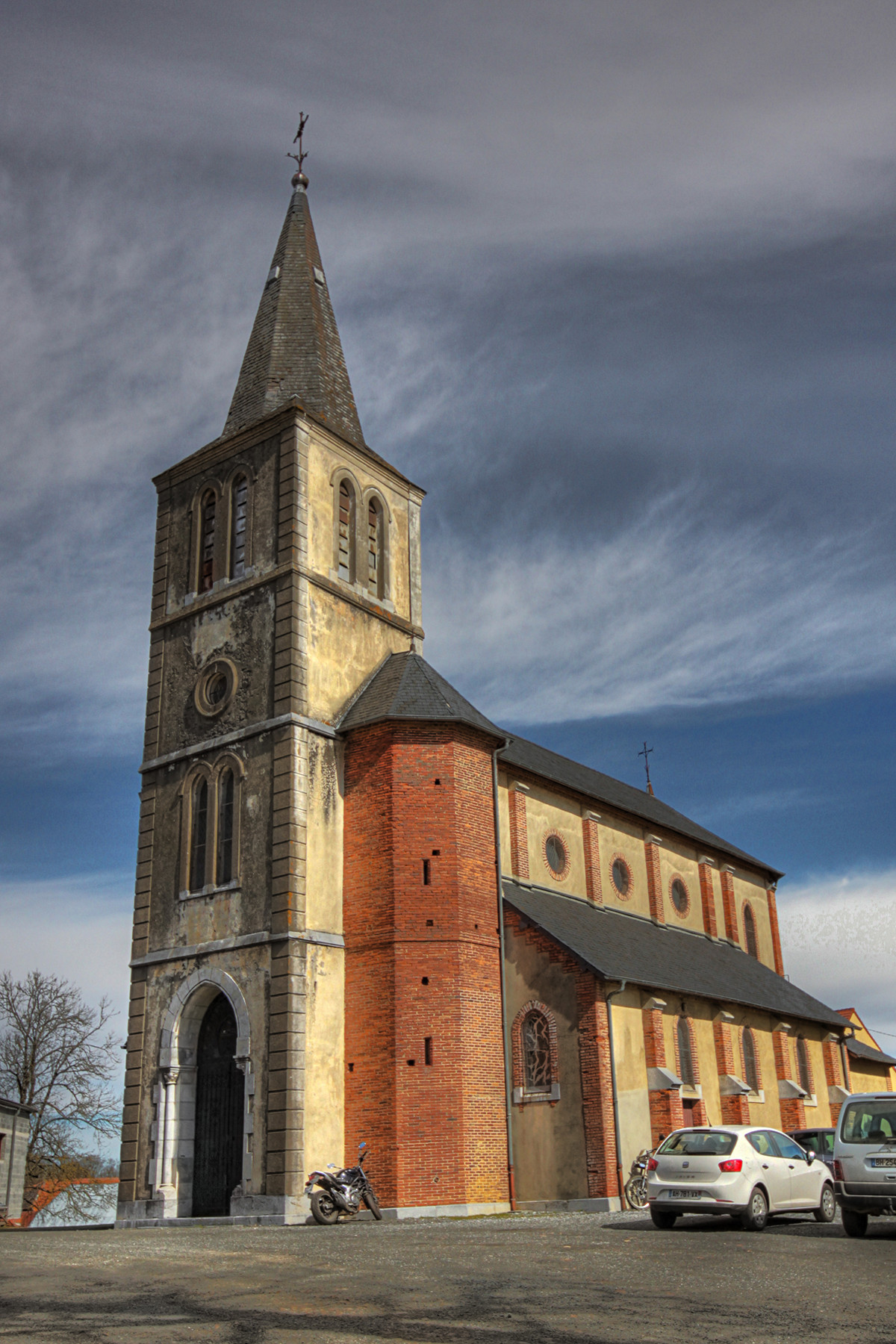
- The church of Ponson-Dessus
- Location of Ponson-Dessus
- Location within France Location within Nouvelle-Aquitaine
- Coordinates: 43°18′56″N 0°03′11″W
- Country: France
- Region: Nouvelle-Aquitaine
- Department: Pyrénées-Atlantiques
- Arrondissement: Pau
- Canton: Vallées de l'Ousse et du Lagoin

Government
  - Mayor (2020–2026): Serge Parzani
- Area^{1}: 11 km^{2} (4.2 sq mi)
- Highest elevation: 389 m (1,276 ft)
- Lowest elevation: 285 m (935 ft)
- Population (2023): 261
  - Density: 24/km^{2} (61/sq mi)
- Time zone: UTC+01:00 (CET)
  - Summer (DST): UTC+02:00 (CEST)
- INSEE/Postal code: 64452 /64460
- ^{1} French Land Register data, which excludes lakes, ponds, glaciers > 1 km^{2} (0.386 sq mi or 247 acres) and river estuaries.

Ponson-Dessus (Occitan: Sòm) is a commune in the Pyrénées-Atlantiques department in south-western France.

Neighboring communes are Ponson-Debat-Pouts to the north, Oroix (in Hautes-Pyrénées) to the east, Séron (also in Hautes-Pyrénées) and Aast to the west, and Ger to the south.

The inhabitants are called ponsonais(e).

== See also ==
- Communes of the Pyrénées-Atlantiques department
