= Luy de Béarn =

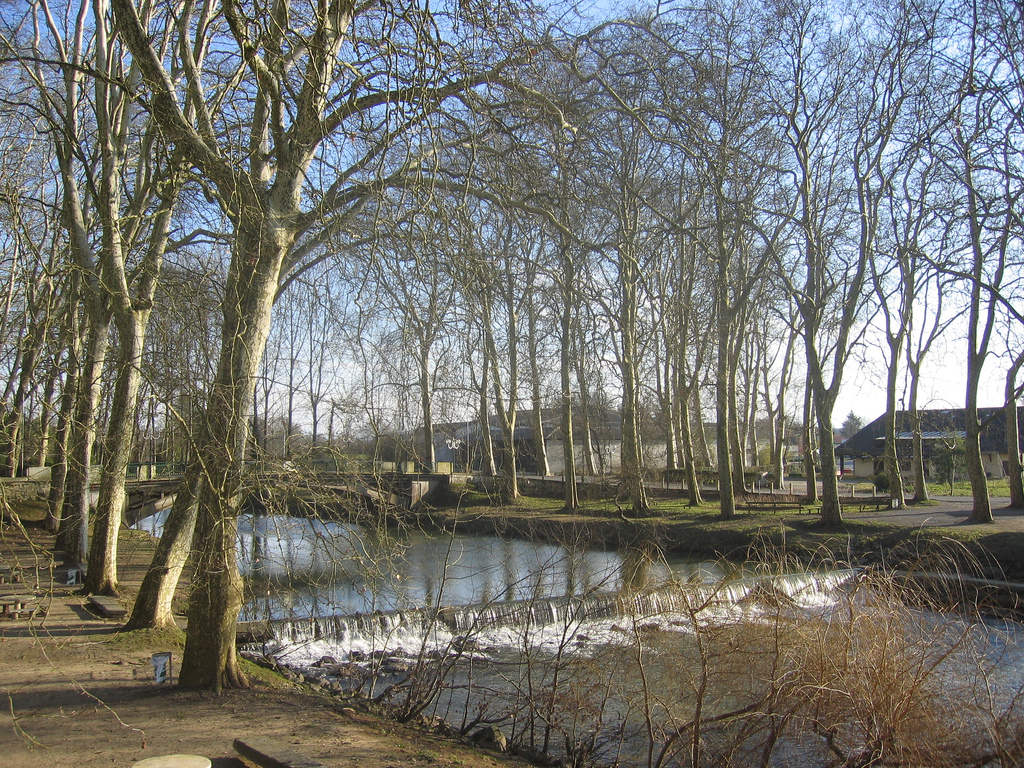
- The Luy de Béarn at Amou

- Location within France Location within Nouvelle-Aquitaine

Location
- Country: France

Physical characteristics
- Source
  - location: Plateau of Ger
- Mouth
  - location: Luy
  - coordinates: 43°37′50″N 0°46′12″W
- Length: 76.6 km (47.6 mi)

Basin features
- Progression: Luy→ Adour→ Atlantic Ocean

The Luy de Béarn (French pronunciation: [lɥi də beaʁn], literally Luy of Béarn; Occitan: Lui de Bearn) is a left tributary of the Luy, in the Southwest of France. It is 76.6 km (47.6 mi) long.

== Geography ==
The source of the Luy de Béarn is at the base of the plateau of Ger, east of Pau. It flows north-west through the Chalosse region and joins the Luy de France to form the Luy below the castle of Gaujacq.

== Départements and towns ==
The Luy de Béarn flows through the following departments and towns:

- Pyrénées-Atlantiques: Montardon, Sauvagnon, Sault-de-Navailles
- Landes: Amou

== Main tributaries ==
- (L) Aïgue Longue, from the moor of Pont-Long in the north of Pau.
- (L) Uzan, in Uzan, also from Pont-Long.
- (L) Aubin.
- (L) Oursoû, from the nord of Orthez.
