= Sault-de-Navailles =

- Commune
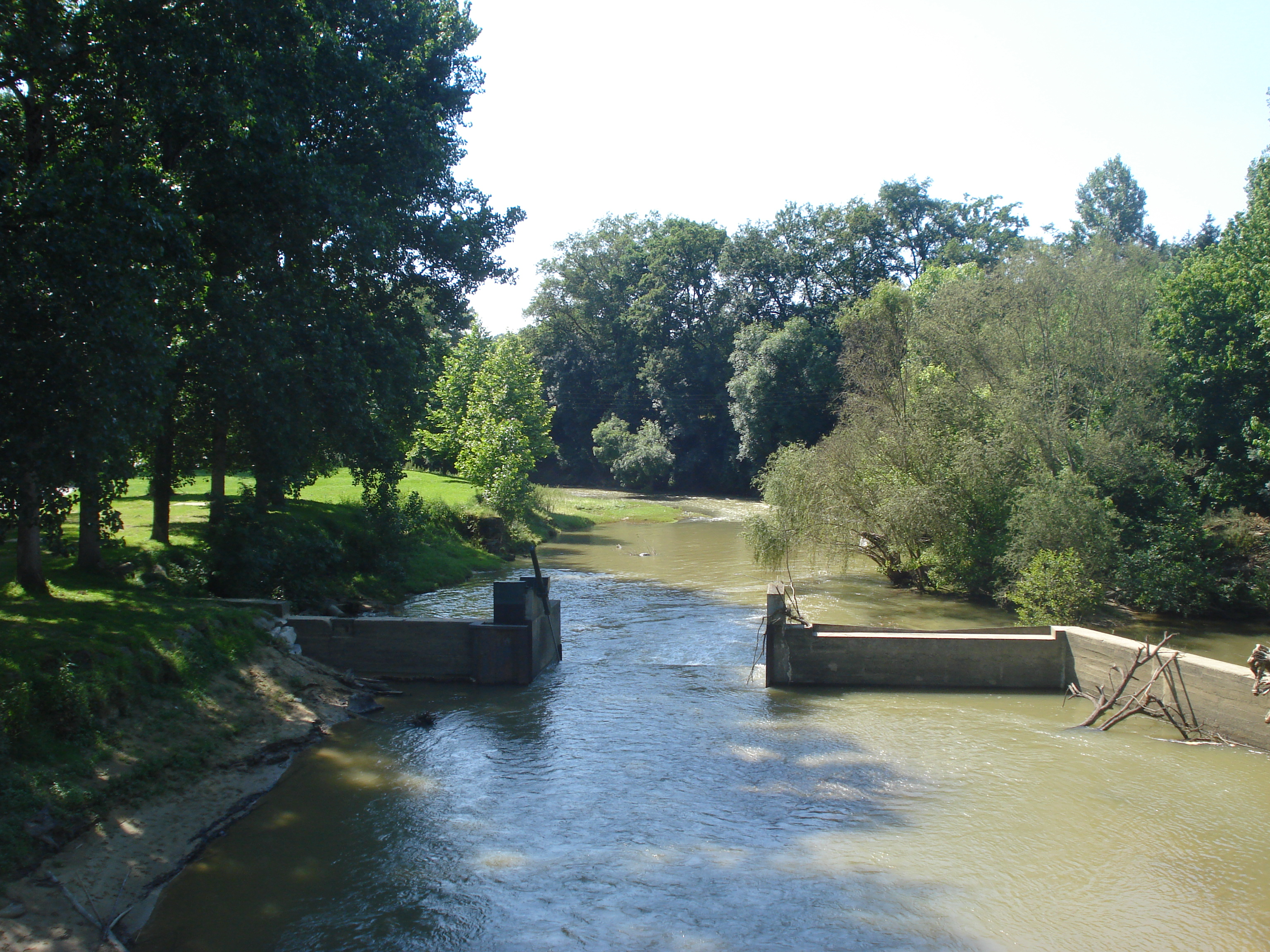
- The Luy de Béarn near Sault-de-Navailles
- Location of Sault-de-Navailles
- Location within France Location within Nouvelle-Aquitaine
- Coordinates: 43°33′07″N 0°40′16″W
- Country: France
- Region: Nouvelle-Aquitaine
- Department: Pyrénées-Atlantiques
- Arrondissement: Pau
- Canton: Artix et Pays de Soubestre
- Intercommunality: Lacq-Orthez

Government
  - Mayor (2020–2026): Michel Dupuy
- Area^{1}: 22.26 km^{2} (8.59 sq mi)
- Elevation: 84 m (276 ft)
- Highest elevation: 180 m (590 ft)
- Lowest elevation: 53 m (174 ft)
- Population (2023): 976
  - Density: 43.8/km^{2} (114/sq mi)
- Time zone: UTC+01:00 (CET)
  - Summer (DST): UTC+02:00 (CEST)
- INSEE/Postal code: 64510 /64300
- ^{1} French Land Register data, which excludes lakes, ponds, glaciers > 1 km^{2} (0.386 sq mi or 247 acres) and river estuaries.

Sault-de-Navailles (French pronunciation: [so də navaj]; Occitan: Saut de Navalhas) is a commune in the Pyrénées-Atlantiques department in south-western France.

== See also ==
- Communes of the Pyrénées-Atlantiques department
