= Gaujacq =

- Commune
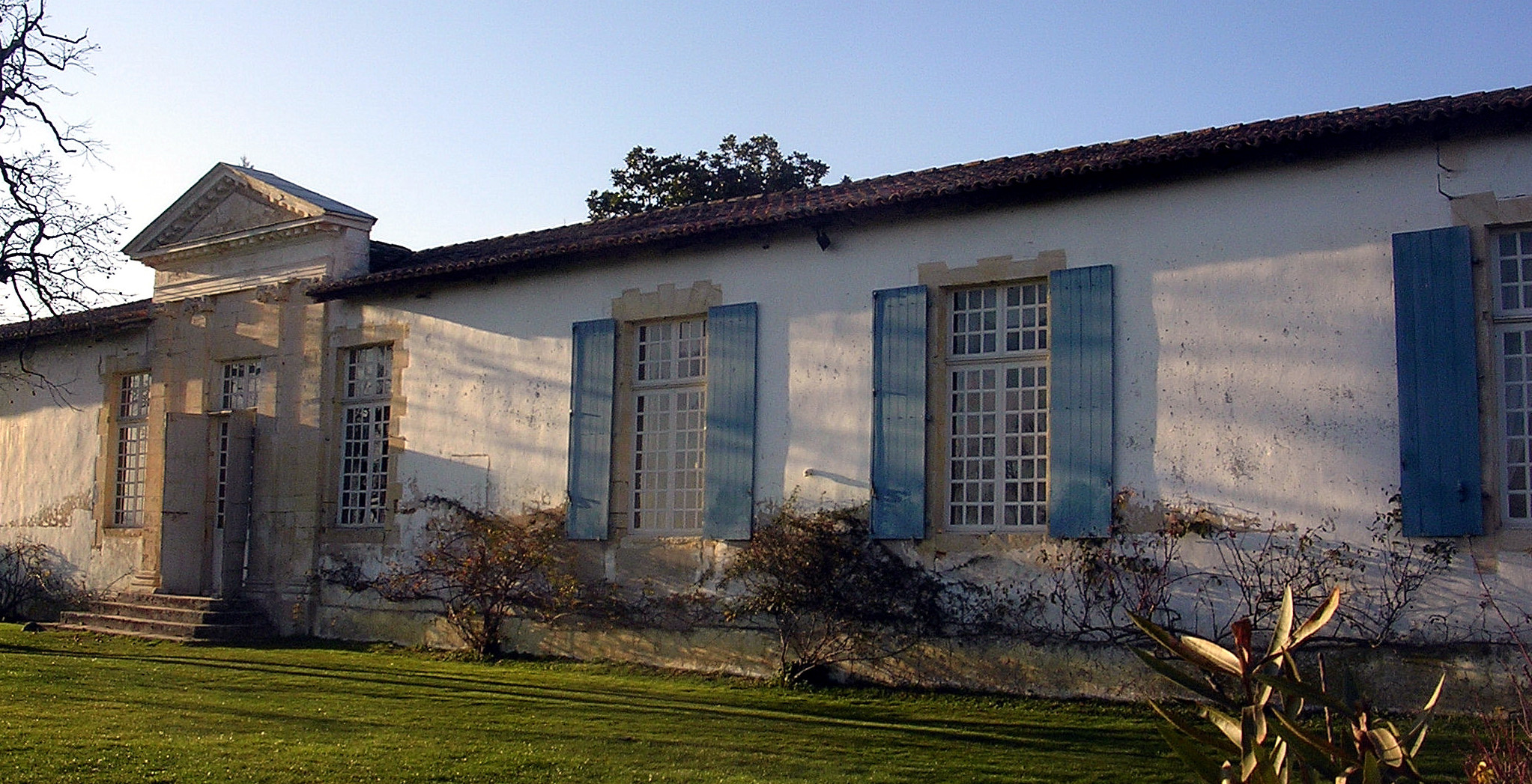
- Chateau
- Location of Gaujacq
- Location within France Location within Nouvelle-Aquitaine
- Coordinates: 43°38′32″N 0°44′14″W
- Country: France
- Region: Nouvelle-Aquitaine
- Department: Landes
- Arrondissement: Dax
- Canton: Coteau de Chalosse

Government
  - Mayor (2020–2026): Jean Rohfritsch
- Area^{1}: 16.14 km^{2} (6.23 sq mi)
- Elevation: 115 m (377 ft)
- Highest elevation: 132 m (433 ft)
- Lowest elevation: 29 m (95 ft)
- Population (2023): 437
  - Density: 27.1/km^{2} (70.1/sq mi)
- Time zone: UTC+01:00 (CET)
  - Summer (DST): UTC+02:00 (CEST)
- INSEE/Postal code: 40109 /40330
- ^{1} French Land Register data, which excludes lakes, ponds, glaciers > 1 km^{2} (0.386 sq mi or 247 acres) and river estuaries.

Gaujacq (French pronunciation: [ɡoʒak]; Occitan: Gaujac) is a commune in the Landes department in Nouvelle-Aquitaine in southwestern France.

== Population ==
Historical population
Year	Pop.	±% p.a.
1968	501	—
1975	463	−1.12%
1982	453	−0.31%
1990	446	−0.19%
1999	411	−0.90%
2007	446	+1.03%
2012	449	+0.13%
2017	435	−0.63%
2023	437	+0.08%
Source: INSEE

== See also ==
- Communes of the Landes department
- Gaujacq quarries narrow gauge railway
