= Luy =

- Location within France Location within Nouvelle-Aquitaine

Location
- Country: France

Physical characteristics
- Source
  - location: Plateau of Ger
- Mouth
  - location: Adour
  - coordinates: 43°39′36″N 1°8′24″W
- Length: 154 km (96 mi) (incl. Luy de France)

Basin features
- Progression: Adour→ Atlantic Ocean

The Luy is a left tributary of the Adour, in the Landes, in the Southwest of France. It is 154.2 km (95.8 mi) long, including its right source river Luy de France.

== Geography ==
The Luy is the union of two neighboring rivers, the Luy de Béarn, which is 77 kilometres (48 mi) long, in the south, and the Luy de France, the main course. Both rise in Béarn, at the base of the plateau of Ger, east of Pau.

They flow north-west through the Chalosse region and join below the castle of Gaujacq. The Luy flows into the Adour downstream from Tercis-les-Bains (south of Dax).

== Départements and towns ==
- Luy de France:
  - Pyrénées-Atlantiques: Morlaàs, Thèze, Casteide-Candau.
- Luy:
  - Landes: Castelnau-Chalosse, Pomarez.

== Main tributaries ==
- Luy de France:
  - (R) Souye, from Espoey.
  - (L) Riu Mayou,
  - (L) Arance,
- Luy :
  - (L) Grand Arrigau.
    - (R) Arrigau du Gert.
