= Amou, Landes =

Amou
- Commune
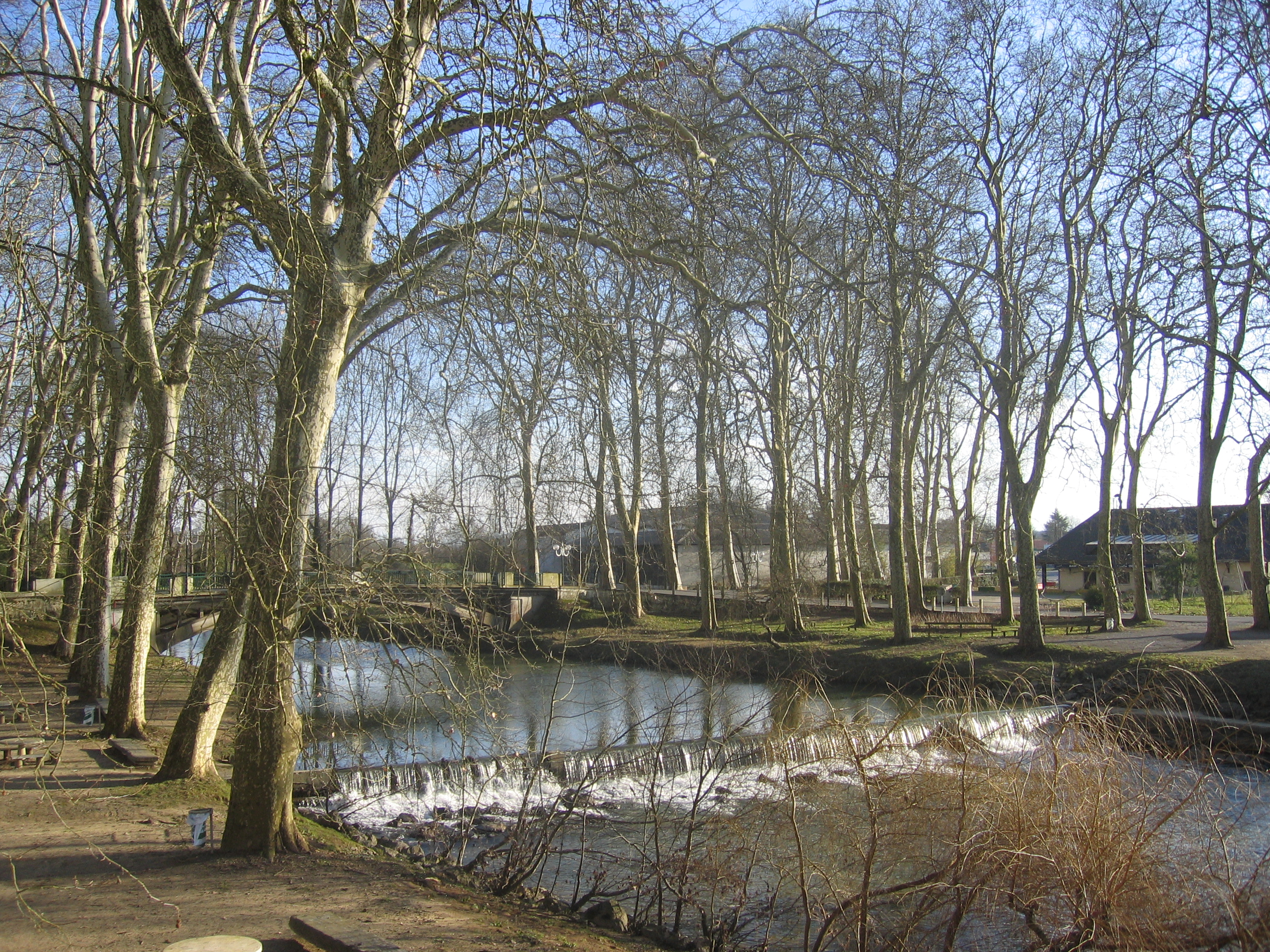
- Luy de Béarn

- Coat of arms
- Location of Amou
- Location within France Location within Nouvelle-Aquitaine
- Coordinates: 43°35′39″N 0°44′46″W
- Country: France
- Region: Nouvelle-Aquitaine
- Department: Landes
- Arrondissement: Dax
- Canton: Coteau de Chalosse
- Intercommunality: Coteaux et Vallées des Luys

Government
  - Mayor (2020–2026): Florence Bergez
- Area^{1}: 27.25 km^{2} (10.52 sq mi)
- Elevation: 44 m (144 ft)
- Highest elevation: 147 m (482 ft)
- Lowest elevation: 31 m (102 ft)
- Population (2023): 1,550
  - Density: 56.9/km^{2} (147/sq mi)
- Time zone: UTC+01:00 (CET)
  - Summer (DST): UTC+02:00 (CEST)
- INSEE/Postal code: 40002 /40330
- ^{1} French Land Register data, which excludes lakes, ponds, glaciers > 1 km^{2} (0.386 sq mi or 247 acres) and river estuaries.

Amou (French pronunciation: [amu]; Occitan: Amor) is a commune of the Landes department in Nouvelle-Aquitaine in south-western France.

== Population ==
Historical population
Year	Pop.	±% p.a.
1968	1,455	—
1975	1,427	−0.28%
1982	1,462	+0.35%
1990	1,481	+0.16%
1999	1,452	−0.22%
2007	1,583	+1.09%
2012	1,523	−0.77%
2017	1,540	+0.22%
2023	1,550	+0.11%
Source: INSEE

== See also ==
- Communes of the Landes department
