= Doumy =

- Commune
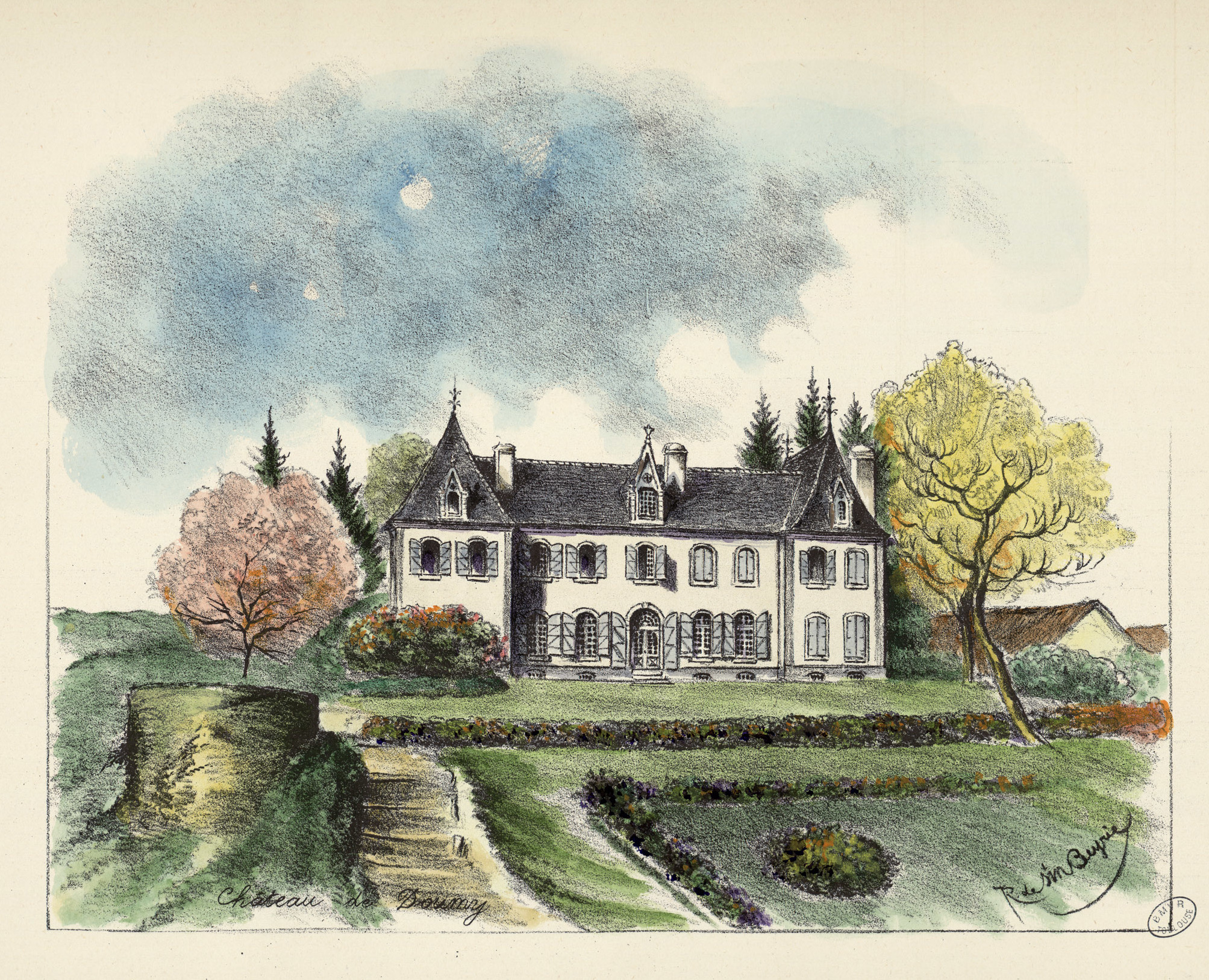
- The château of Doumy
- Location of Doumy
- Location within France Location within Nouvelle-Aquitaine
- Coordinates: 43°26′52″N 0°22′29″W
- Country: France
- Region: Nouvelle-Aquitaine
- Department: Pyrénées-Atlantiques
- Arrondissement: Pau
- Canton: Terres des Luys et Coteaux du Vic-Bilh

Government
  - Mayor (2020–2026): Jean-Marc Desclaux
- Area^{1}: 6 km^{2} (2.3 sq mi)
- Elevation: 160 m (520 ft)
- Highest elevation: 282 m (925 ft)
- Lowest elevation: 151 m (495 ft)
- Population (2023): 325
  - Density: 54/km^{2} (140/sq mi)
- Time zone: UTC+01:00 (CET)
  - Summer (DST): UTC+02:00 (CEST)
- INSEE/Postal code: 64203 /64450
- ^{1} French Land Register data, which excludes lakes, ponds, glaciers > 1 km^{2} (0.386 sq mi or 247 acres) and river estuaries.

Doumy (French pronunciation: [dumi]; Occitan: Domin) is a commune in the Pyrénées-Atlantiques department in south-western France.

== See also ==
- Communes of the Pyrénées-Atlantiques department
