= Bournos =

- Commune
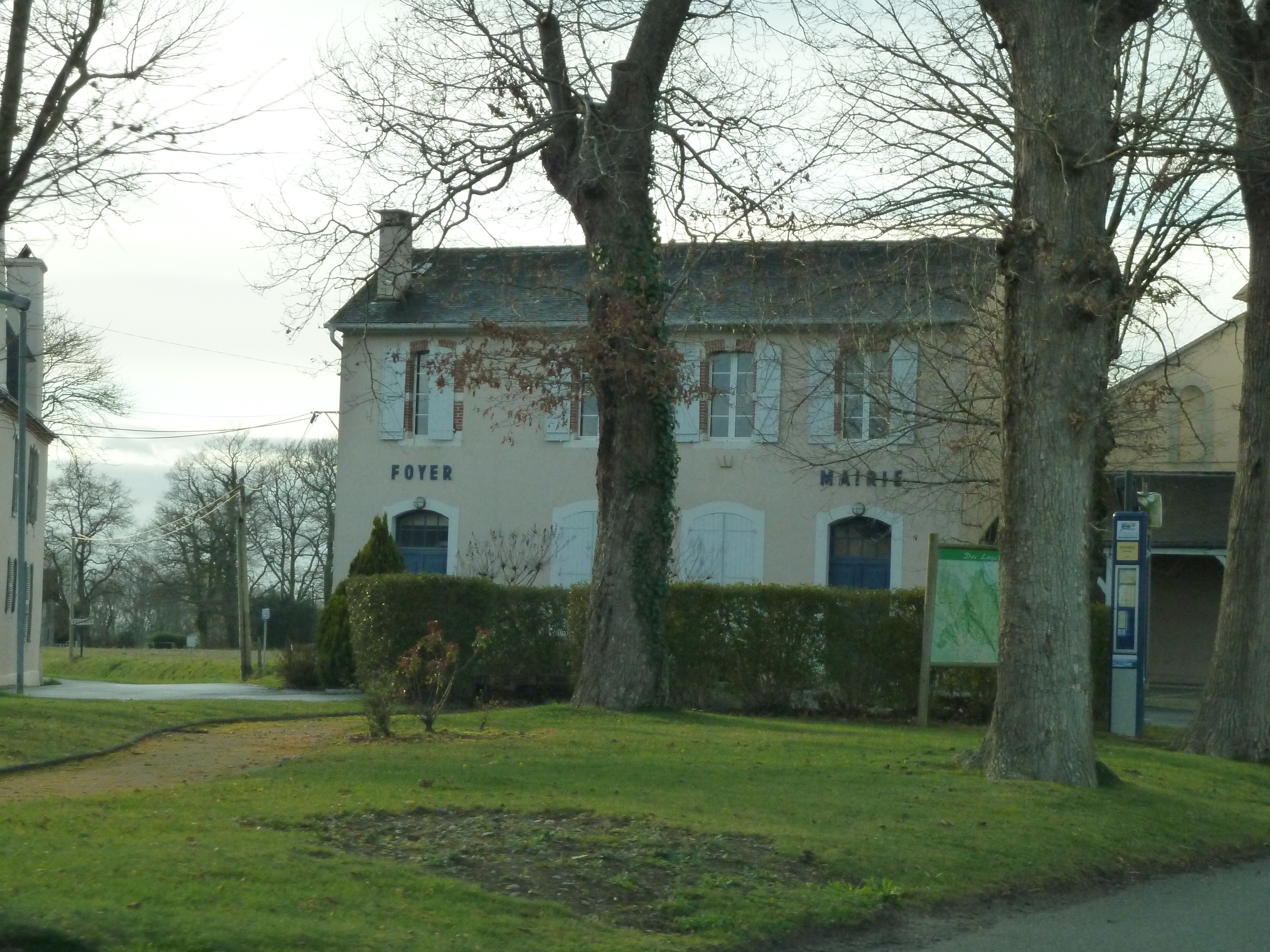
- Town hall
- Location of Bournos
- Location within France Location within Nouvelle-Aquitaine
- Coordinates: 43°26′26″N 0°23′10″W
- Country: France
- Region: Nouvelle-Aquitaine
- Department: Pyrénées-Atlantiques
- Arrondissement: Pau
- Canton: Terres des Luys et Coteaux du Vic-Bilh

Government
  - Mayor (2020–2026): Jean Barus
- Area^{1}: 5.74 km^{2} (2.22 sq mi)
- Elevation: 276 m (906 ft)
- Highest elevation: 277 m (909 ft)
- Lowest elevation: 176 m (577 ft)
- Population (2023): 338
  - Density: 58.9/km^{2} (153/sq mi)
- Time zone: UTC+01:00 (CET)
  - Summer (DST): UTC+02:00 (CEST)
- INSEE/Postal code: 64146 /64450
- ^{1} French Land Register data, which excludes lakes, ponds, glaciers > 1 km^{2} (0.386 sq mi or 247 acres) and river estuaries.

Bournos (French pronunciation: [buʁnɔs]; Occitan: Bornòs) is a commune in the Pyrénées-Atlantiques department in southwestern France.

== See also ==
- Communes of the Pyrénées-Atlantiques department
