= Ger, Pyrénées-Atlantiques =

Ger
- Commune
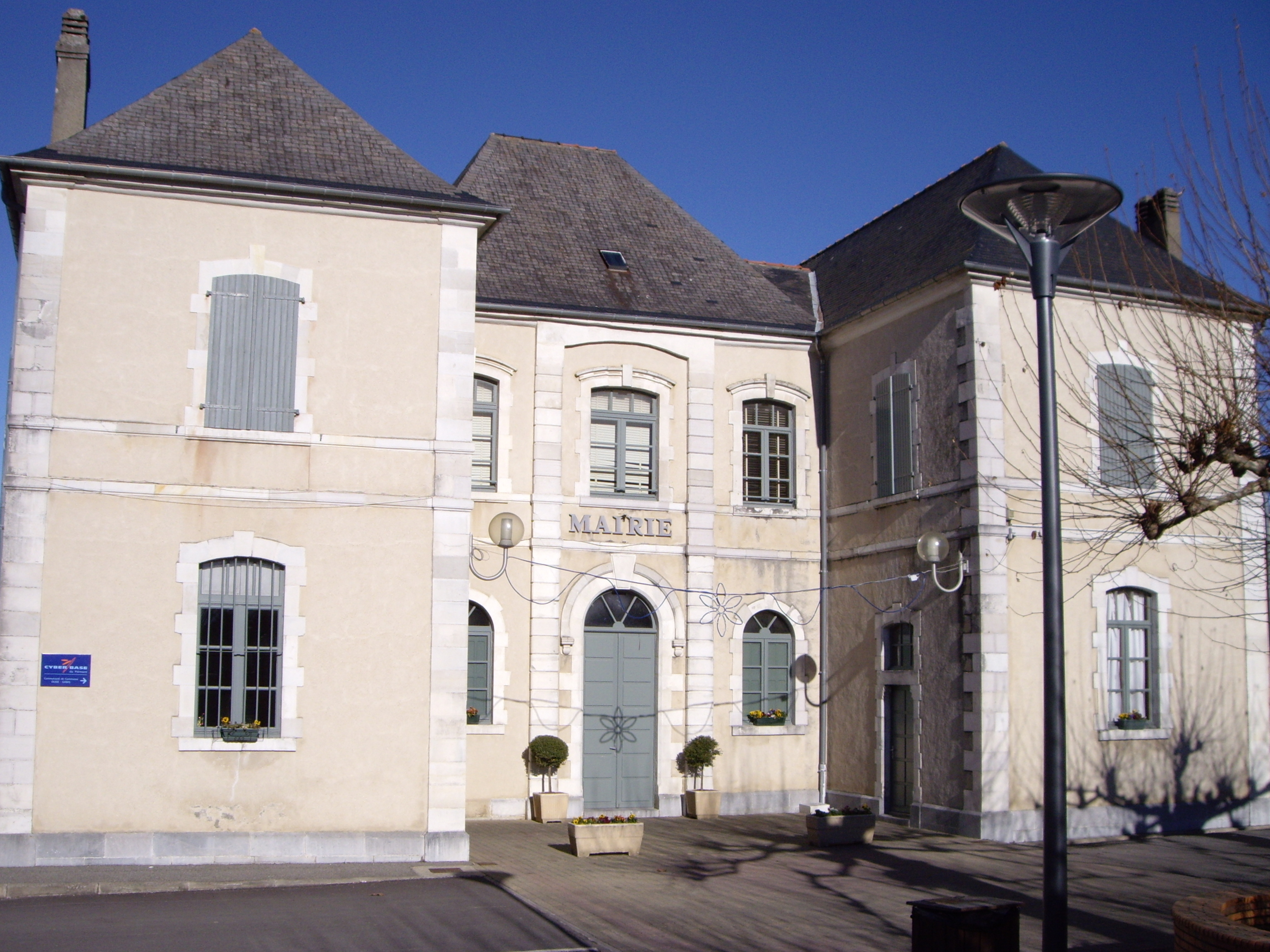
- Town Hall

- Coat of arms
- Location of Ger
- Location within France Location within Nouvelle-Aquitaine
- Coordinates: 43°15′14″N 0°03′02″W
- Country: France
- Region: Nouvelle-Aquitaine
- Department: Pyrénées-Atlantiques
- Arrondissement: Pau
- Canton: Vallées de l'Ousse et du Lagoin
- Intercommunality: Nord Est Béarn

Government
  - Mayor (2020–2026): Jean-Michel Patacq
- Area^{1}: 31.49 km^{2} (12.16 sq mi)
- Elevation: 409 m (1,342 ft)
- Highest elevation: 435 m (1,427 ft)
- Lowest elevation: 332 m (1,089 ft)
- Population (2023): 2,137
  - Density: 67.86/km^{2} (175.8/sq mi)
- Time zone: UTC+01:00 (CET)
  - Summer (DST): UTC+02:00 (CEST)
- INSEE/Postal code: 64238 /64530
- ^{1} French Land Register data, which excludes lakes, ponds, glaciers > 1 km^{2} (0.386 sq mi or 247 acres) and river estuaries.

Ger (French pronunciation: [ʒɛʁ]; Occitan: Gèr) is a commune in the Pyrénées-Atlantiques department in south-western France.

== Population ==
Historical population
Year	Pop.	±% p.a.
1968	1,016	—
1975	1,135	+1.59%
1982	1,366	+2.68%
1990	1,482	+1.02%
1999	1,648	+1.19%
2007	2,035	+2.67%
2012	1,933	−1.02%
2017	1,899	−0.35%
2023	2,137	+1.99%
Source: INSEE

== See also ==
- Communes of the Pyrénées-Atlantiques department
