= François Clément Lafaury =

French entomologist

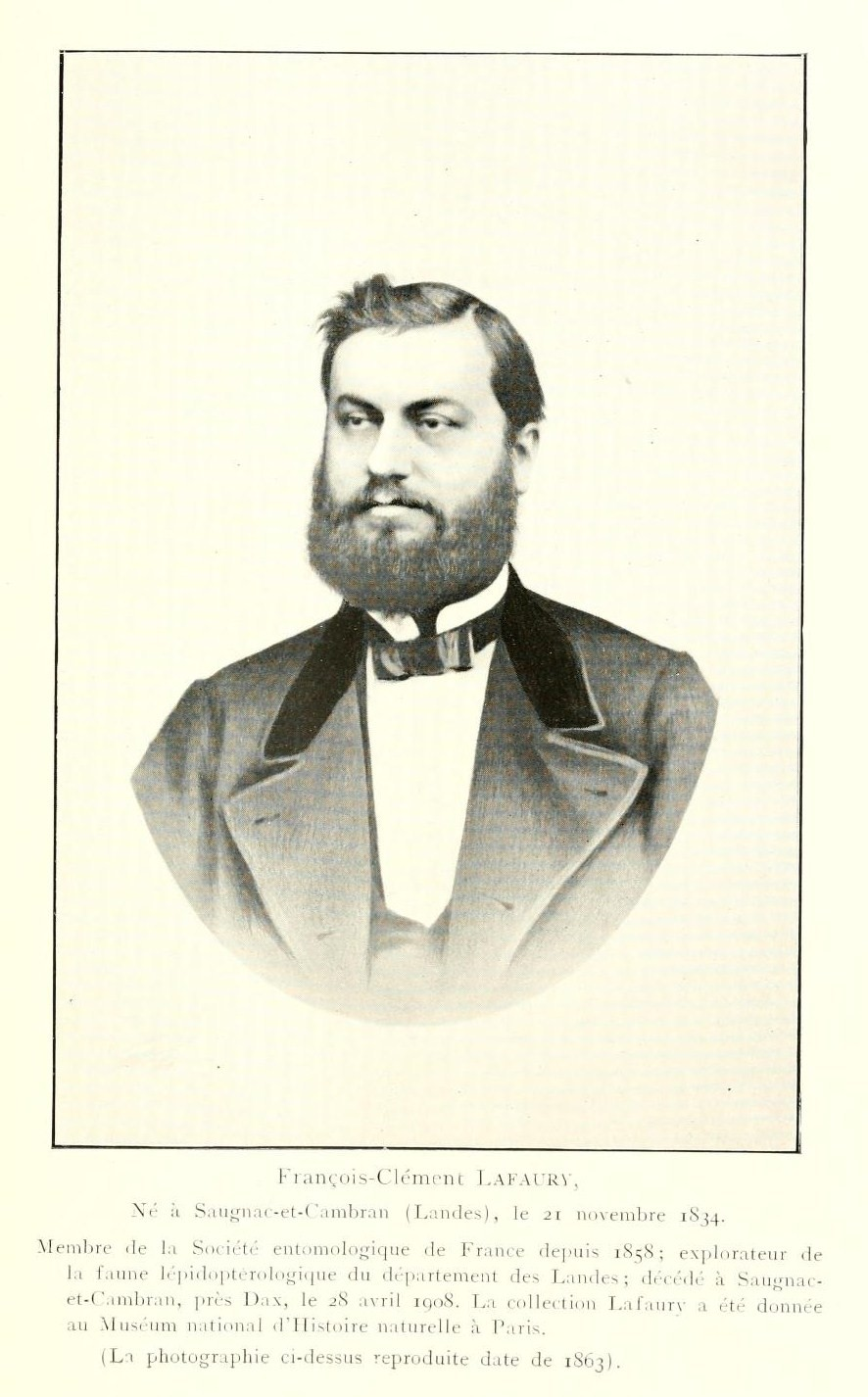
François Clément Lafaury

François Clément Lafaury (1834, Saugnac-et-Cambran −1908, Saugnac-et-Cambran) was a French entomologist who specialised in Lepidoptera. He is honoured in the name Choristoneura lafauryana.

His collection is held by Muséum national d'histoire naturelle in Paris.

Francois Clément Lafaury became a Member of the Société entomologique de France in 1858. He was principally interested in the Lepidoptera fauna of Landes including the Microlepidoptera.
