= Angoumeius =

Angoumeius Temporal range: Lutetian

Scientific classification
- Kingdom: Animalia
- Phylum: Chordata
- Class: Chondrichthyes
- Subclass: Elasmobranchii
- Division: Selachii
- Order: Squaliformes
- Family: Dalatiidae
- Genus: †Angoumeius; Adnet et al., 2006
- Species: †A. paradoxus

Binomial name
- †Angoumeius paradoxus Adnet et al. 2006

Genus of extinct squaliform sharks

Angoumeius is an extinct genus of squaliform shark from the Eocene epoch of the Paleogene period. It is named for its type locality, Angoumé, France. It is known from a single species, A. paradoxus. It is known from many isolated teeth from the Lutetian stage. The inferred dentition is highly unusual for so its familial placement and relationship with other genera remains uncertain. It may be close to Kitefin or Sleeper sharks.
