= Calmei =

California-based seller of Myrica rubra fruits

- Type: Private
- Industry: Consumer products; Agricultural producers
- Founded: 2018
- Founders: Yunfei Chen, Charlie Lucero
- Headquarters: California
- Products: Myrica rubra
- Website: calmei-yangmei.com

Calmei is a California-based seller of Myrica rubra fruits founded in 2018.

Yunfei Chen grew out trees from seed in 2009 and then grafted on imported trees from China in 2012. The company was founded by Chen and Charlie Lucero in 2018.

Calmei sells four varieties of Myrica rubra – purple pearl, eastern giant, sweet violet and pink crystal – which are licensed to farmers.
