= Mées =

- Commune
- Location of Mées
- Location within France Location within Nouvelle-Aquitaine
- Coordinates: 43°42′11″N 1°06′23″W
- Country: France
- Region: Nouvelle-Aquitaine
- Department: Landes
- Arrondissement: Dax
- Canton: Dax-1
- Intercommunality: CA Grand Dax

Government
  - Mayor (2020–2026): Sophie Irigoyen
- Area^{1}: 15.11 km^{2} (5.83 sq mi)
- Elevation: 8 m (26 ft)
- Highest elevation: 49 m (161 ft)
- Lowest elevation: 1 m (3.3 ft)
- Population (2023): 2,036
  - Density: 134.7/km^{2} (349.0/sq mi)
- Time zone: UTC+01:00 (CET)
  - Summer (DST): UTC+02:00 (CEST)
- INSEE/Postal code: 40179 /40990
- ^{1} French Land Register data, which excludes lakes, ponds, glaciers > 1 km^{2} (0.386 sq mi or 247 acres) and river estuaries.

Mées (French pronunciation: [mɛs]; Occitan: Mers) is a commune in the Landes department in Nouvelle-Aquitaine in south-western France.

== Population ==
Historical population
Year	Pop.	±% p.a.
1968	974	—
1975	987	+0.19%
1982	1,009	+0.32%
1990	1,311	+3.33%
1999	1,377	+0.55%
2007	1,646	+2.26%
2012	1,730	+1.00%
2017	1,805	+0.85%
2023	2,036	+2.03%
Source: INSEE

== Notable people ==
- Andrée Viollis (1870–1950), journalist and writer

== See also ==
- Communes of the Landes department
