= Gourbera =

- Commune
- Location of Gourbera
- Location within France Location within Nouvelle-Aquitaine
- Coordinates: 43°48′18″N 1°02′48″W
- Country: France
- Region: Nouvelle-Aquitaine
- Department: Landes
- Arrondissement: Dax
- Canton: Dax-1
- Intercommunality: CA Grand Dax

Government
  - Mayor (2020–2026): Philippe Castel
- Area^{1}: 27.73 km^{2} (10.71 sq mi)
- Elevation: 65 m (213 ft)
- Highest elevation: 84 m (276 ft)
- Lowest elevation: 26 m (85 ft)
- Population (2023): 364
  - Density: 13.1/km^{2} (34.0/sq mi)
- Time zone: UTC+01:00 (CET)
  - Summer (DST): UTC+02:00 (CEST)
- INSEE/Postal code: 40114 /40990
- ^{1} French Land Register data, which excludes lakes, ponds, glaciers > 1 km^{2} (0.386 sq mi or 247 acres) and river estuaries.

Gourbera (French pronunciation: [ɡuʁbəʁa]; Occitan: Gorberar) is a commune in the Landes department in Nouvelle-Aquitaine in southwestern France.

== Population ==
Historical population
Year	Pop.	±% p.a.
1968	179	—
1975	197	+1.38%
1982	215	+1.26%
1990	243	+1.54%
1999	256	+0.58%
2007	260	+0.19%
2012	371	+7.37%
2017	372	+0.05%
2023	364	−0.36%
Source: INSEE

== See also ==
- Communes of the Landes department
