= Tercis-les-Bains =

- Commune
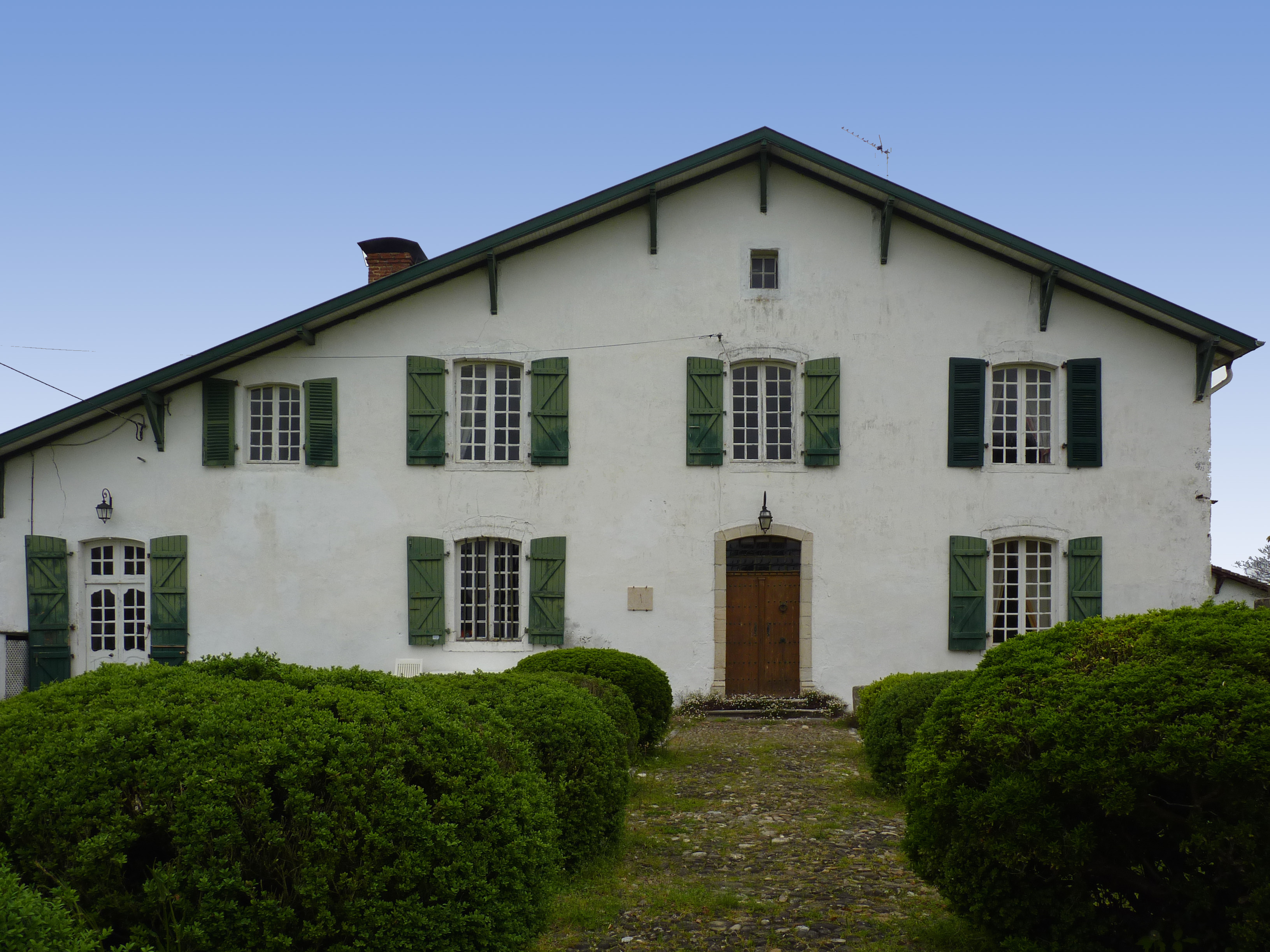
- Town hall

- Coat of arms
- Location of Tercis-les-Bains
- Location within France Location within Nouvelle-Aquitaine
- Coordinates: 43°40′20″N 1°06′33″W
- Country: France
- Region: Nouvelle-Aquitaine
- Department: Landes
- Arrondissement: Dax
- Canton: Dax-1
- Intercommunality: CA Grand Dax

Government
  - Mayor (2020–2026): Hikmat Chahine
- Area^{1}: 10.19 km^{2} (3.93 sq mi)
- Elevation: 42 m (138 ft)
- Highest elevation: 62 m (203 ft)
- Lowest elevation: 2 m (6.6 ft)
- Population (2023): 1,359
  - Density: 133.4/km^{2} (345.4/sq mi)
- Time zone: UTC+01:00 (CET)
  - Summer (DST): UTC+02:00 (CEST)
- INSEE/Postal code: 40314 /40180
- ^{1} French Land Register data, which excludes lakes, ponds, glaciers > 1 km^{2} (0.386 sq mi or 247 acres) and river estuaries.

Tercis-les-Bains (French pronunciation: [tɛʁsis le bɛ̃]; Occitan: Tèrcis) is a commune of the Landes department in Nouvelle-Aquitaine in southwestern France.

== Population ==
Historical population
| Year | Pop. | ±% p.a. |
|---|---|---|
| 1968 | 600 | — |
| 1975 | 612 | +0.28% |
| 1982 | 790 | +3.71% |
| 1990 | 966 | +2.55% |
| 1999 | 1,035 | +0.77% |
| 2007 | 1,147 | +1.29% |
| 2012 | 1,164 | +0.29% |
| 2017 | 1,203 | +0.66% |
| 2023 | 1,359 | +2.05% |
Source: INSEE

== See also ==
- Communes of the Landes department
