= Oeyreluy =

- Commune
- Location of Oeyreluy
- Location within France Location within Nouvelle-Aquitaine
- Coordinates: 43°40′20″N 1°04′44″W
- Country: France
- Region: Nouvelle-Aquitaine
- Department: Landes
- Arrondissement: Dax
- Canton: Dax-2
- Intercommunality: CA Grand Dax

Government
  - Mayor (2020–2026): Philippe Laffitte
- Area^{1}: 5.72 km^{2} (2.21 sq mi)
- Elevation: 10 m (33 ft)
- Highest elevation: 44 m (144 ft)
- Lowest elevation: 2 m (6.6 ft)
- Population (2023): 1,493
  - Density: 261/km^{2} (676/sq mi)
- Time zone: UTC+01:00 (CET)
  - Summer (DST): UTC+02:00 (CEST)
- INSEE/Postal code: 40207 /40180
- ^{1} French Land Register data, which excludes lakes, ponds, glaciers > 1 km^{2} (0.386 sq mi or 247 acres) and river estuaries.

Oeyreluy (French pronunciation: [wɛjʁəlœj]; Occitan: Ueire Lui) is a commune in the Landes department in Nouvelle-Aquitaine in southwestern France.

== Population ==
Historical population
Year	Pop.	±% p.a.
1968	635	—
1975	914	+5.34%
1982	1,136	+3.16%
1990	1,063	−0.83%
1999	1,120	+0.58%
2007	1,530	+3.98%
2012	1,598	+0.87%
2017	1,508	−1.15%
2023	1,493	−0.17%
Source: INSEE

== See also ==
- Communes of the Landes department
