= Herm, Landes =

Herm
- Commune
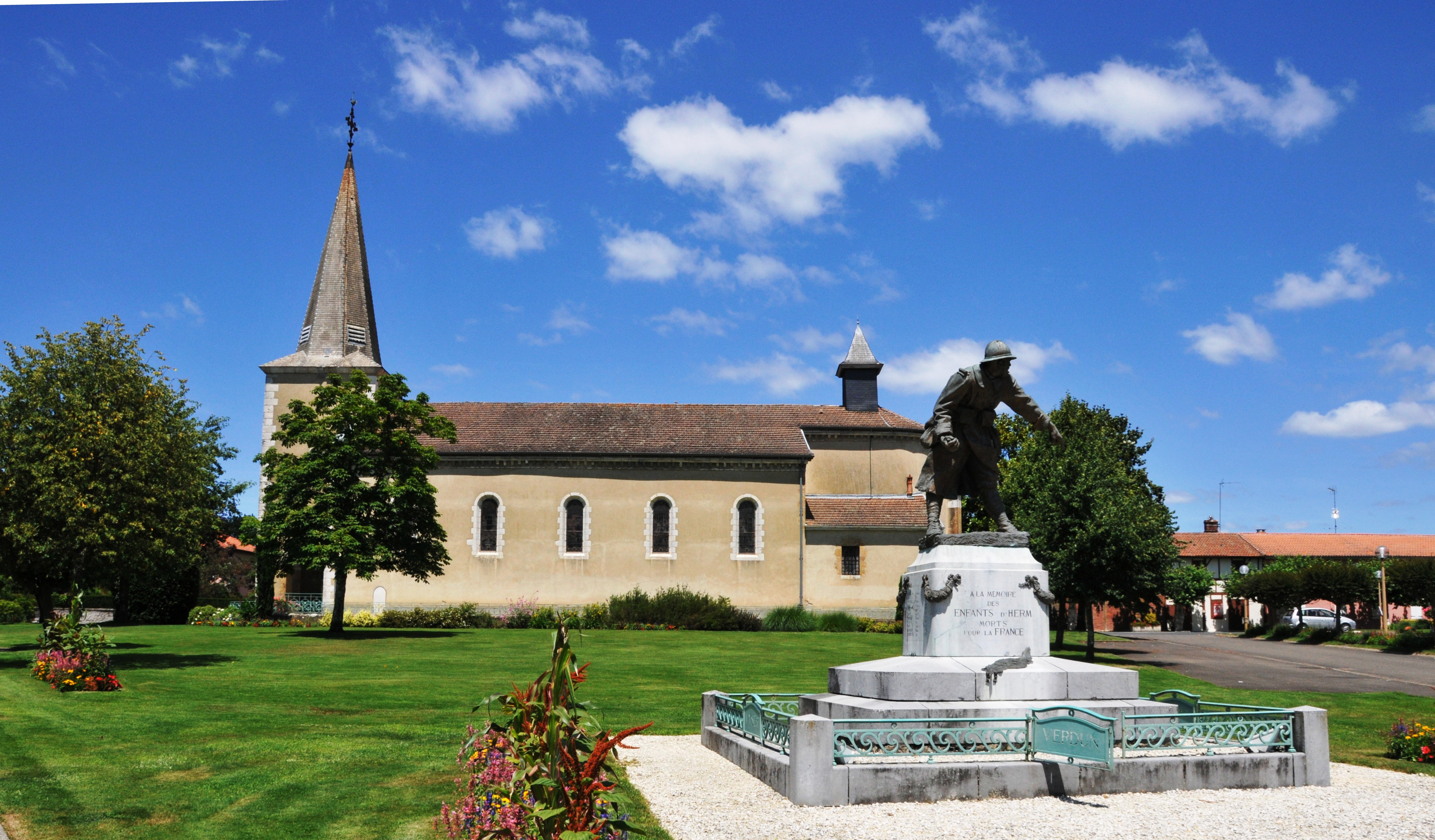
- Church and war memorial

- Coat of arms
- Location of Herm
- Location within France Location within Nouvelle-Aquitaine
- Coordinates: 43°48′29″N 1°08′35″W
- Country: France
- Region: Nouvelle-Aquitaine
- Department: Landes
- Arrondissement: Dax
- Canton: Dax-1
- Intercommunality: CA Grand Dax

Government
  - Mayor (2022–2026): Pascal Lavigne
- Area^{1}: 52.08 km^{2} (20.11 sq mi)
- Elevation: 60 m (200 ft)
- Highest elevation: 84 m (276 ft)
- Lowest elevation: 28 m (92 ft)
- Population (2023): 1,185
  - Density: 22.75/km^{2} (58.93/sq mi)
- Time zone: UTC+01:00 (CET)
  - Summer (DST): UTC+02:00 (CEST)
- INSEE/Postal code: 40123 /40990
- ^{1} French Land Register data, which excludes lakes, ponds, glaciers > 1 km^{2} (0.386 sq mi or 247 acres) and river estuaries.

Herm (French pronunciation: [ɛʁm]; Occitan: Èrm) is a commune in the Landes department in Nouvelle-Aquitaine in southwestern France.

== Population ==
Historical population
Year	Pop.	±% p.a.
1968	674	—
1975	595	−1.77%
1982	617	+0.52%
1990	694	+1.48%
1999	783	+1.35%
2007	977	+2.81%
2012	1,082	+2.06%
2017	1,129	+0.85%
2023	1,185	+0.81%
Source: INSEE

== See also ==
- Communes of the Landes department
