= Seyresse =

- Commune
- Location of Seyresse
- Location within France Location within Nouvelle-Aquitaine
- Coordinates: 43°41′14″N 1°03′50″W
- Country: France
- Region: Nouvelle-Aquitaine
- Department: Landes
- Arrondissement: Dax
- Canton: Dax-2
- Intercommunality: CA Grand Dax

Government
  - Mayor (2020–2026): Philippe Delmon
- Area^{1}: 2.23 km^{2} (0.86 sq mi)
- Elevation: 20 m (66 ft)
- Highest elevation: 38 m (125 ft)
- Lowest elevation: 2 m (6.6 ft)
- Population (2023): 1,029
  - Density: 461/km^{2} (1,200/sq mi)
- Time zone: UTC+01:00 (CET)
  - Summer (DST): UTC+02:00 (CEST)
- INSEE/Postal code: 40300 /40180
- ^{1} French Land Register data, which excludes lakes, ponds, glaciers > 1 km^{2} (0.386 sq mi or 247 acres) and river estuaries.

Seyresse (French pronunciation: [sejʁɛs]; Occitan: Seiressa) is a commune in the Landes department in Nouvelle-Aquitaine in southwestern France.

== Population ==
Historical population
Year	Pop.	±% p.a.
1968	263	—
1975	255	−0.44%
1982	506	+10.28%
1990	616	+2.49%
1999	597	−0.35%
2007	769	+3.22%
2012	833	+1.61%
2017	922	+2.05%
2023	1,029	+1.85%
Source: INSEE

== See also ==
- Communes of the Landes department
