= Téthieu =

- Commune
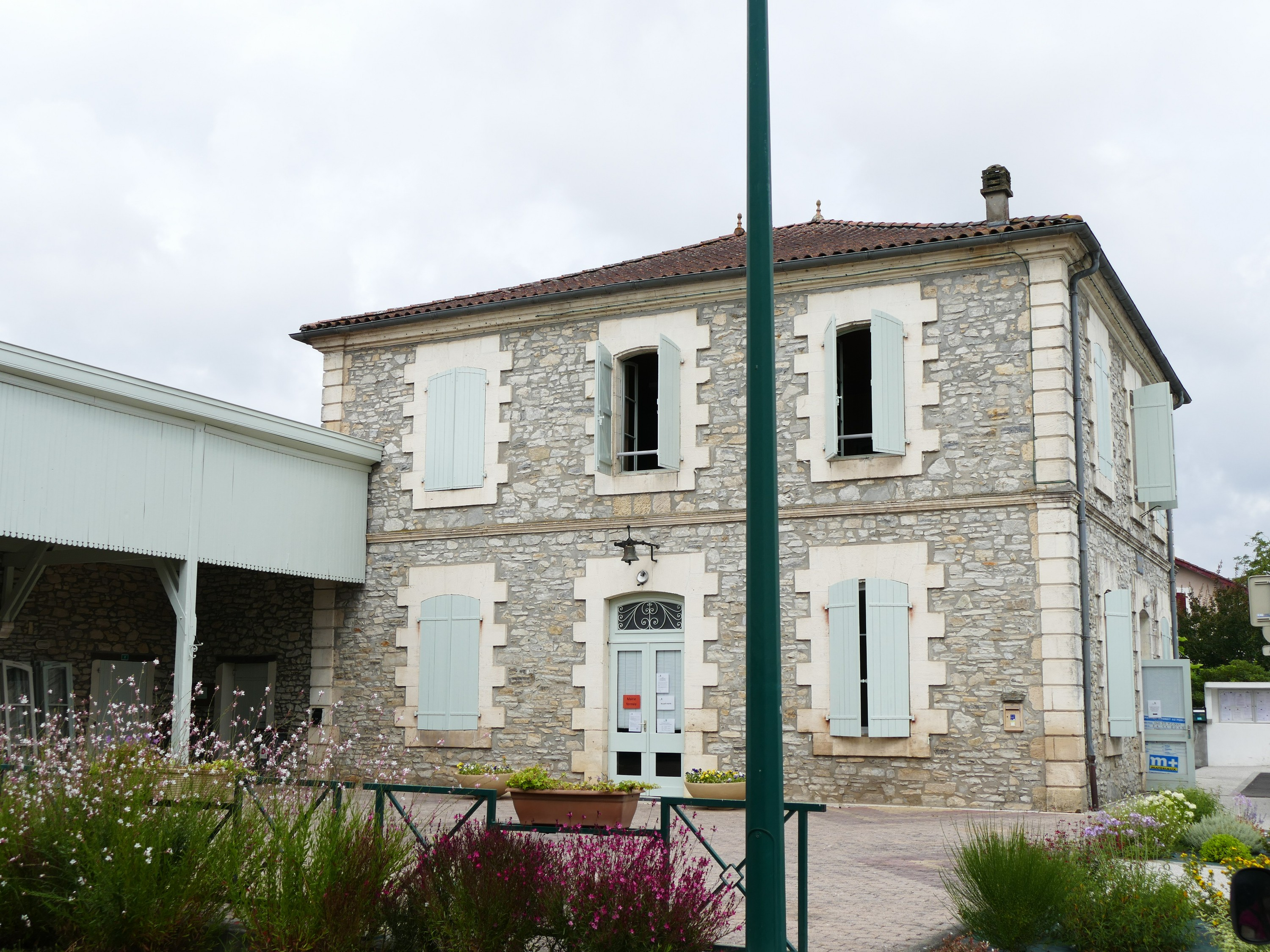
- Town hall
- Location of Téthieu
- Location within France Location within Nouvelle-Aquitaine
- Coordinates: 43°45′08″N 0°58′25″W
- Country: France
- Region: Nouvelle-Aquitaine
- Department: Landes
- Arrondissement: Dax
- Canton: Dax-1
- Intercommunality: CA Grand Dax

Government
  - Mayor (2020–2026): Alain Dubourdieu
- Area^{1}: 11.03 km^{2} (4.26 sq mi)
- Elevation: 10 m (33 ft)
- Highest elevation: 34 m (112 ft)
- Lowest elevation: 4 m (13 ft)
- Population (2023): 758
  - Density: 68.7/km^{2} (178/sq mi)
- Time zone: UTC+01:00 (CET)
  - Summer (DST): UTC+02:00 (CEST)
- INSEE/Postal code: 40315 /40990
- ^{1} French Land Register data, which excludes lakes, ponds, glaciers > 1 km^{2} (0.386 sq mi or 247 acres) and river estuaries.

Téthieu (French pronunciation: [tetjø]; Occitan: Tetiu, before 1995: Thétieu) is a commune in the Landes department in Nouvelle-Aquitaine in southwestern France.

== Population ==
Historical population
Year	Pop.	±% p.a.
1968	488	—
1975	466	−0.66%
1982	486	+0.60%
1990	485	−0.03%
1999	494	+0.20%
2007	634	+3.17%
2012	693	+1.80%
2017	759	+1.84%
2023	758	−0.02%
Source: INSEE

== See also ==
- Communes of the Landes department
