= Siest =

- Commune
- Location of Siest
- Location within France Location within Nouvelle-Aquitaine
- Coordinates: 43°39′N 1°08′W
- Country: France
- Region: Nouvelle-Aquitaine
- Department: Landes
- Arrondissement: Dax
- Canton: Dax-1
- Intercommunality: CA Grand Dax

Government
  - Mayor (2020–2026): Bernard Langouanère
- Area^{1}: 2.91 km^{2} (1.12 sq mi)
- Elevation: 17 m (56 ft)
- Highest elevation: 97 m (318 ft)
- Lowest elevation: 1 m (3.3 ft)
- Population (2023): 135
  - Density: 46.4/km^{2} (120/sq mi)
- Time zone: UTC+01:00 (CET)
  - Summer (DST): UTC+02:00 (CEST)
- INSEE/Postal code: 40301 /40180
- ^{1} French Land Register data, which excludes lakes, ponds, glaciers > 1 km^{2} (0.386 sq mi or 247 acres) and river estuaries.

Siest (Occitan: Sièsta) is a commune located in the Landes department of Nouvelle-Aquitaine in southwestern France.

== Population ==
Historical population
| Year | Pop. | ±% p.a. |
|---|---|---|
| 1968 | 70 | — |
| 1975 | 72 | +0.40% |
| 1982 | 66 | −1.24% |
| 1990 | 82 | +2.75% |
| 1999 | 82 | +0.00% |
| 2007 | 110 | +3.74% |
| 2012 | 115 | +0.89% |
| 2017 | 138 | +3.71% |
| 2023 | 135 | −0.37% |
Source: INSEE

== See also ==
- Communes of the Landes department
