= Yzosse =

- Commune
- Location of Yzosse
- Location within France Location within Nouvelle-Aquitaine
- Coordinates: 43°42′47″N 1°00′42″W
- Country: France
- Region: Nouvelle-Aquitaine
- Department: Landes
- Arrondissement: Dax
- Canton: Dax-2
- Intercommunality: CA Grand Dax

Government
  - Mayor (2020–2026): Thierry Bourdillas
- Area^{1}: 5.32 km^{2} (2.05 sq mi)
- Elevation: 10 m (33 ft)
- Highest elevation: 12 m (39 ft)
- Lowest elevation: 4 m (13 ft)
- Population (2023): 386
  - Density: 72.6/km^{2} (188/sq mi)
- Demonym(s): Yzossais, Yzossaises
- Time zone: UTC+01:00 (CET)
  - Summer (DST): UTC+02:00 (CEST)
- INSEE/Postal code: 40334 /40180
- ^{1} French Land Register data, which excludes lakes, ponds, glaciers > 1 km^{2} (0.386 sq mi or 247 acres) and river estuaries.

Yzosse (French pronunciation: [izɔs]; Occitan: Isòssa) is a commune in the Landes department in Nouvelle-Aquitaine in southwestern France.

== Population ==
Historical population

Year	Pop.	±% p.a.
1793	159	—
1800	169	+0.88%
1806	159	−1.01%
1821	203	+1.64%
1831	228	+1.17%
1836	233	+0.43%
1841	238	+0.43%
1846	277	+3.08%
1851	290	+0.92%
1856	282	−0.56%
1861	271	−0.79%
1866	291	+1.43%
1872	286	−0.29%
1876	276	−0.89%
1881	311	+2.42%
1886	293	−1.19%
1891	302	+0.61%
1896	285	−1.15%
1901	297	+0.83%

Year	Pop.	±% p.a.
1906	298	+0.07%
1911	281	−1.17%
1921	247	−1.28%
1926	253	+0.48%
1931	244	−0.72%
1936	247	+0.24%
1946	242	−0.20%
1954	250	+0.41%
1962	301	+2.35%
1968	298	−0.17%
1975	291	−0.34%
1982	333	+1.94%
1990	312	−0.81%
1999	430	+3.63%
2007	402	−0.84%
2012	405	+0.15%
2017	367	−1.95%
2023	386	+0.84%

Source: EHESS (1793–1999) and INSEE

== See also ==
- Communes of the Landes department
