= Château des Évêques (Saint-Pandelon) =

Historic château in Saint-Pandelon, France

- Interactive map of Château des Évêques
- 43.6742°N 1.0372°W
- Location: Saint-Pandelon, Landes, France

History
- Built: from 1304

Monument historique
- Designated: 25 July 1973
- Reference no.: PA00084009

The Château des Évêques (also known as the château des évêques de Dax, and today as the Domaine Array Dou Sou) is a former episcopal residence in the commune of Saint-Pandelon, in the Landes department of Nouvelle-Aquitaine, south-western France. Built from 1304 as a summer residence for the bishops of Dax and remodelled until the 18th century, the building has been partially listed as a monument historique since 1973, and its surroundings form a protected site (site classé). After standing empty for several years, the château was acquired in 2021 and restored, reopening to the public in 2025.

== Location ==
Saint-Pandelon lies a few kilometres south of Dax, on a promontory overlooking the Luy valley, near Dax station, which is served by direct TGV high-speed trains to Paris and Bordeaux.

== History ==
The site has been occupied since protohistoric times, when a fortification was raised on an oppidum set on a motte within an enclosure. A fortified tower was built in 1304 by Garsias-Arnaud de Caupenne, bishop of Dax, and the castle became the country residence of the bishops of Dax, who held it until the French Revolution. In the 16th century it underwent major alterations while Bishop François de Noailles resided there; it was restored in the 17th century, and a north wing was added in 1774.

Sold as a bien national in 1791, the château passed to the Ducros family. It was sold again in 1966 to Jacques Subes, who undertook an extensive restoration and reproduced 18th-century wallpapers using historical techniques. After the death of the Subes, the building remained closed for about eight years. In 2021 it was bought by brothers Jean-François and Mickaël Devena, who carried out major restoration work; renamed Array Dou Sou (Gascon for "ray of sunshine"), it reopened to the public in 2025.

== Architecture ==
The château has a rectangular plan arranged around a central cour d'honneur. The outbuildings stand on the north side. On the interior of the south and east ranges, a helical staircase gives access to the first floor, and a medieval tower with a dovecote on its upper level stands at the angle of the north and west ranges.

== Heritage protection ==
The façades and roofs, together with the dining room and the drawing room with their decoration, were listed as a monument historique by an order (arrêté) of 25 July 1973. The château and its grounds were also classified as a protected site (site classé) by a decree of the same year.

== Current use ==
Since its restoration, the estate operates as a venue for weddings, seminars and cultural events, and hosts concerts and exhibitions.
