= Saint-Pandelon =

- Commune
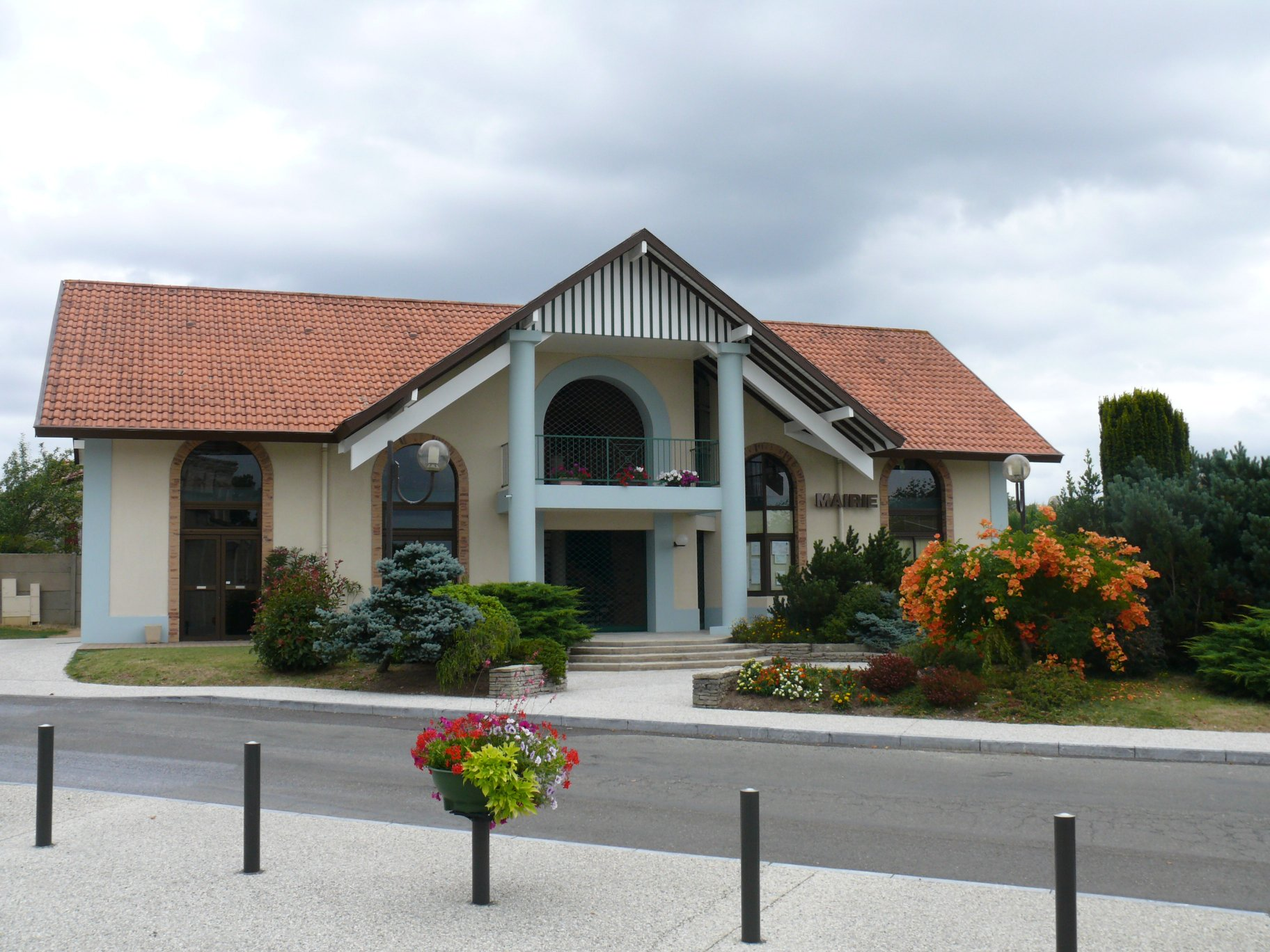
- Town Hall
- Location of Saint-Pandelon
- Location within France Location within Nouvelle-Aquitaine
- Coordinates: 43°40′14″N 1°02′15″W
- Country: France
- Region: Nouvelle-Aquitaine
- Department: Landes
- Arrondissement: Dax
- Canton: Dax-2
- Intercommunality: CA Grand Dax

Government
  - Mayor (2020–2026): Christian Carrere
- Area^{1}: 9.18 km^{2} (3.54 sq mi)
- Elevation: 45 m (148 ft)
- Highest elevation: 61 m (200 ft)
- Lowest elevation: 1 m (3.3 ft)
- Population (2023): 749
  - Density: 81.6/km^{2} (211/sq mi)
- Time zone: UTC+01:00 (CET)
  - Summer (DST): UTC+02:00 (CEST)
- INSEE/Postal code: 40277 /40180
- ^{1} French Land Register data, which excludes lakes, ponds, glaciers > 1 km^{2} (0.386 sq mi or 247 acres) and river estuaries.

Saint-Pandelon (French pronunciation: [sɛ̃ pɑ̃dlɔ̃]; Occitan: Sent Pandelon) is a commune in the Landes department in Nouvelle-Aquitaine in southwestern France.

== Geography ==
The commune is located in Chalosse on the river Luy.

== Population ==
Historical population
Year	Pop.	±% p.a.
1968	523	—
1975	574	+1.34%
1982	600	+0.63%
1990	627	+0.55%
1999	667	+0.69%
2007	741	+1.32%
2012	717	−0.66%
2017	715	−0.06%
2023	749	+0.78%
Source: INSEE

== Sights ==
- Saint-Pantaléon-et-Saint-Barthélemy Church
- The salt fountain
- Saline water
- Some castles:
  - the Château des Évêques (formerly called the Ducros castle), the former seat of the bishops of Dax, now known as Domaine Array Dou Sou,
  - the Hercular's castle,
  - the Haubardin castle,
  - the Laureta castle,
  - the Herran castle.

== Local life ==
The town's annual patronal festival is celebrated over the last weekend of August.

== See also ==
- Communes of the Landes department
