= Rivière-Saas-et-Gourby =

- Commune
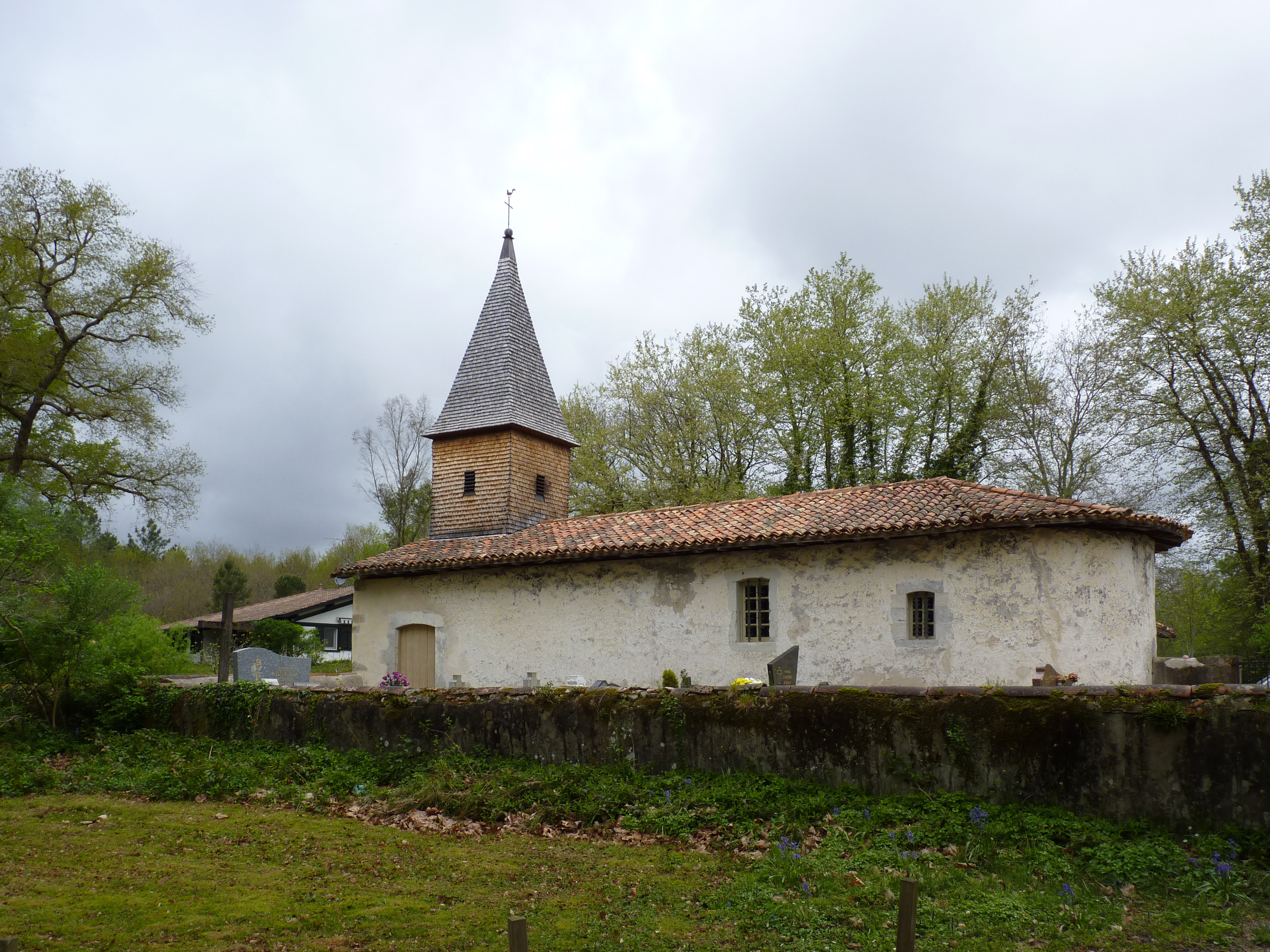
- Location of Rivière-Saas-et-Gourby
- Location within France Location within Nouvelle-Aquitaine
- Coordinates: 43°40′48″N 1°09′02″W
- Country: France
- Region: Nouvelle-Aquitaine
- Department: Landes
- Arrondissement: Dax
- Canton: Dax-1
- Intercommunality: CA Grand Dax

Government
  - Mayor (2020–2026): Hervé Darrigade
- Area^{1}: 27.37 km^{2} (10.57 sq mi)
- Elevation: 7 m (23 ft)
- Highest elevation: 57 m (187 ft)
- Lowest elevation: 2 m (6.6 ft)
- Population (2023): 1,476
  - Density: 53.93/km^{2} (139.7/sq mi)
- Time zone: UTC+01:00 (CET)
  - Summer (DST): UTC+02:00 (CEST)
- INSEE/Postal code: 40244 /40180
- ^{1} French Land Register data, which excludes lakes, ponds, glaciers > 1 km^{2} (0.386 sq mi or 247 acres) and river estuaries.

Rivière-Saas-et-Gourby (French pronunciation: [ʁivjɛʁ sas e ɡuʁbi]; Occitan: Ribèra-Saas e Gorbí) is a commune in the Landes department in Nouvelle-Aquitaine in southwestern France.

== Population ==
Historical population
Year	Pop.	±% p.a.
1968	698	—
1975	699	+0.02%
1982	675	−0.50%
1990	809	+2.29%
1999	939	+1.67%
2007	1,131	+2.35%
2012	1,199	+1.17%
2017	1,217	+0.30%
2023	1,476	+3.27%
Source: INSEE

== See also ==
- Communes of the Landes department
