= Heugas =

- Commune
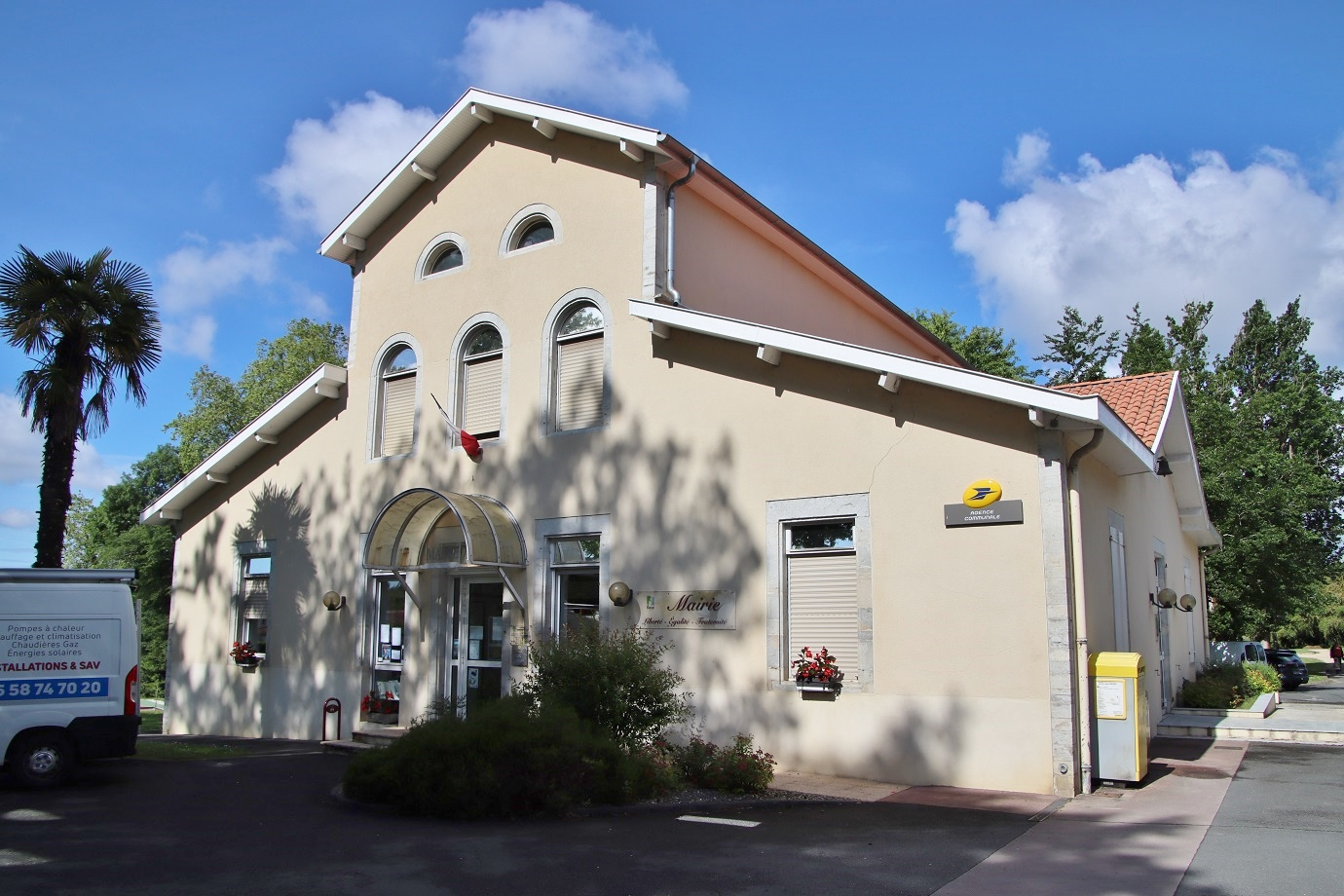
- Heugas Town hall

- Coat of arms
- Location of Heugas
- Location within France Location within Nouvelle-Aquitaine
- Coordinates: 43°38′36″N 1°04′46″W
- Country: France
- Region: Nouvelle-Aquitaine
- Department: Landes
- Arrondissement: Dax
- Canton: Dax-2
- Intercommunality: CA Grand Dax

Government
  - Mayor (2020–2026): Serge Pomarez
- Area^{1}: 18.79 km^{2} (7.25 sq mi)
- Elevation: 60 m (200 ft)
- Highest elevation: 80 m (260 ft)
- Lowest elevation: 1 m (3.3 ft)
- Population (2023): 1,398
  - Density: 74.40/km^{2} (192.7/sq mi)
- Time zone: UTC+01:00 (CET)
  - Summer (DST): UTC+02:00 (CEST)
- INSEE/Postal code: 40125 /40180
- ^{1} French Land Register data, which excludes lakes, ponds, glaciers > 1 km^{2} (0.386 sq mi or 247 acres) and river estuaries.

Heugas (French pronunciation: [øɡas]; Occitan: Heugars) is a commune in the Landes department in Nouvelle-Aquitaine in southwestern France.

== Population ==
Historical population
Year	Pop.	±% p.a.
1968	876	—
1975	929	+0.84%
1982	1,192	+3.63%
1990	1,280	+0.89%
1999	1,268	−0.10%
2007	1,228	−0.40%
2012	1,279	+0.82%
2017	1,343	+0.98%
2023	1,398	+0.67%
Source: INSEE

== See also ==
- Communes of the Landes department
