= Candresse =

- Commune
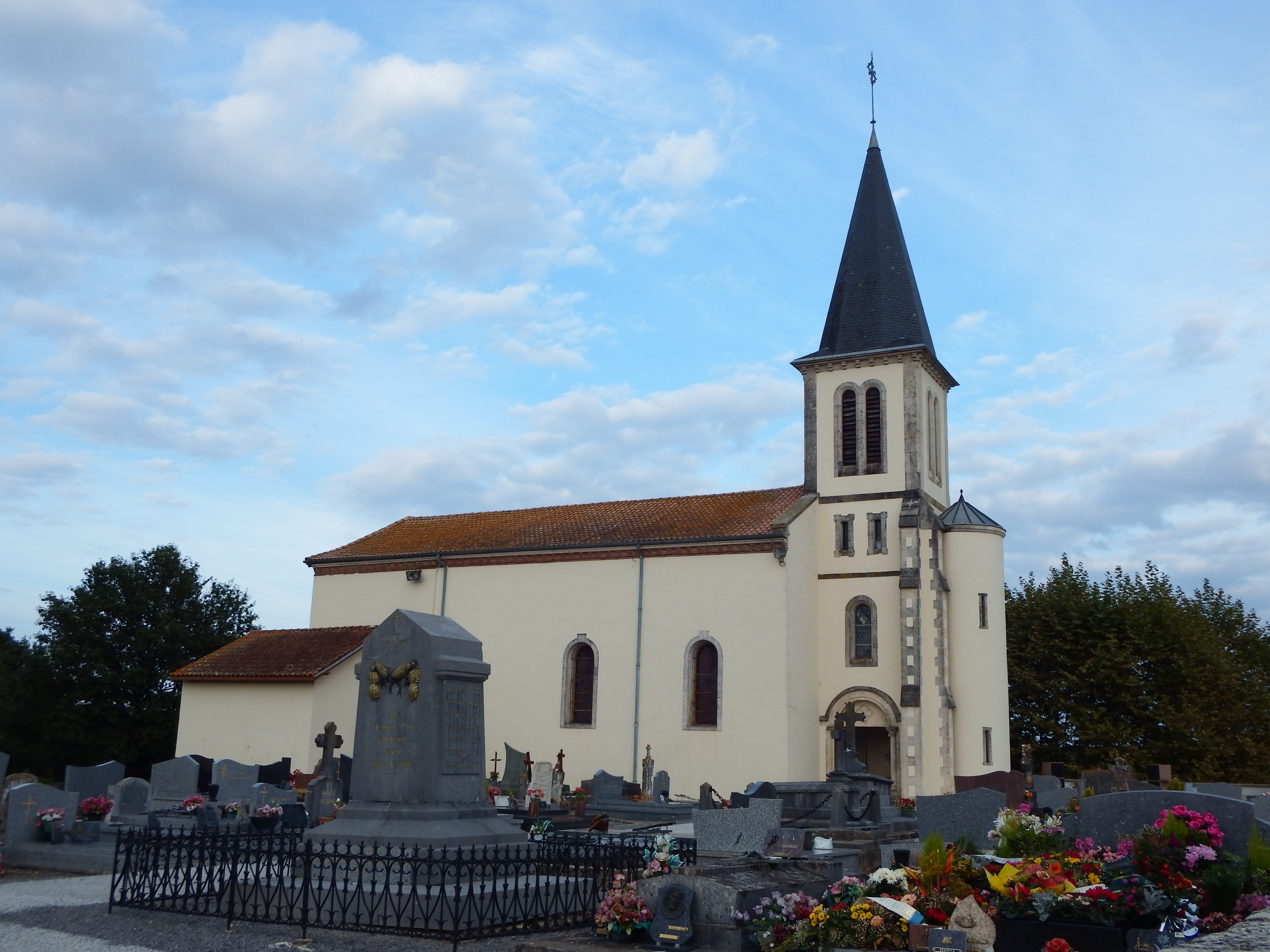
- Location of Candresse
- Location within France Location within Nouvelle-Aquitaine
- Coordinates: 43°42′47″N 0°58′43″W
- Country: France
- Region: Nouvelle-Aquitaine
- Department: Landes
- Arrondissement: Dax
- Canton: Dax-2
- Intercommunality: CA Grand Dax

Government
  - Mayor (2020–2026): Guylaine Dutoya
- Area^{1}: 8.54 km^{2} (3.30 sq mi)
- Elevation: 15 m (49 ft)
- Highest elevation: 48 m (157 ft)
- Lowest elevation: 4 m (13 ft)
- Population (2023): 872
  - Density: 102/km^{2} (264/sq mi)
- Time zone: UTC+01:00 (CET)
  - Summer (DST): UTC+02:00 (CEST)
- INSEE/Postal code: 40063 /40180
- ^{1} French Land Register data, which excludes lakes, ponds, glaciers > 1 km^{2} (0.386 sq mi or 247 acres) and river estuaries.

Candresse (French pronunciation: [kɑ̃dʁɛs]; Occitan: Candressa) is a commune in the Landes department in Nouvelle-Aquitaine in southwestern France.

== Population ==
Historical population
Year	Pop.	±% p.a.
1968	403	—
1975	386	−0.61%
1982	416	+1.07%
1990	526	+2.98%
1999	558	+0.66%
2007	807	+4.72%
2012	784	−0.58%
2017	807	+0.58%
2023	872	+1.30%
Source: INSEE

== See also ==
- Communes of the Landes department
