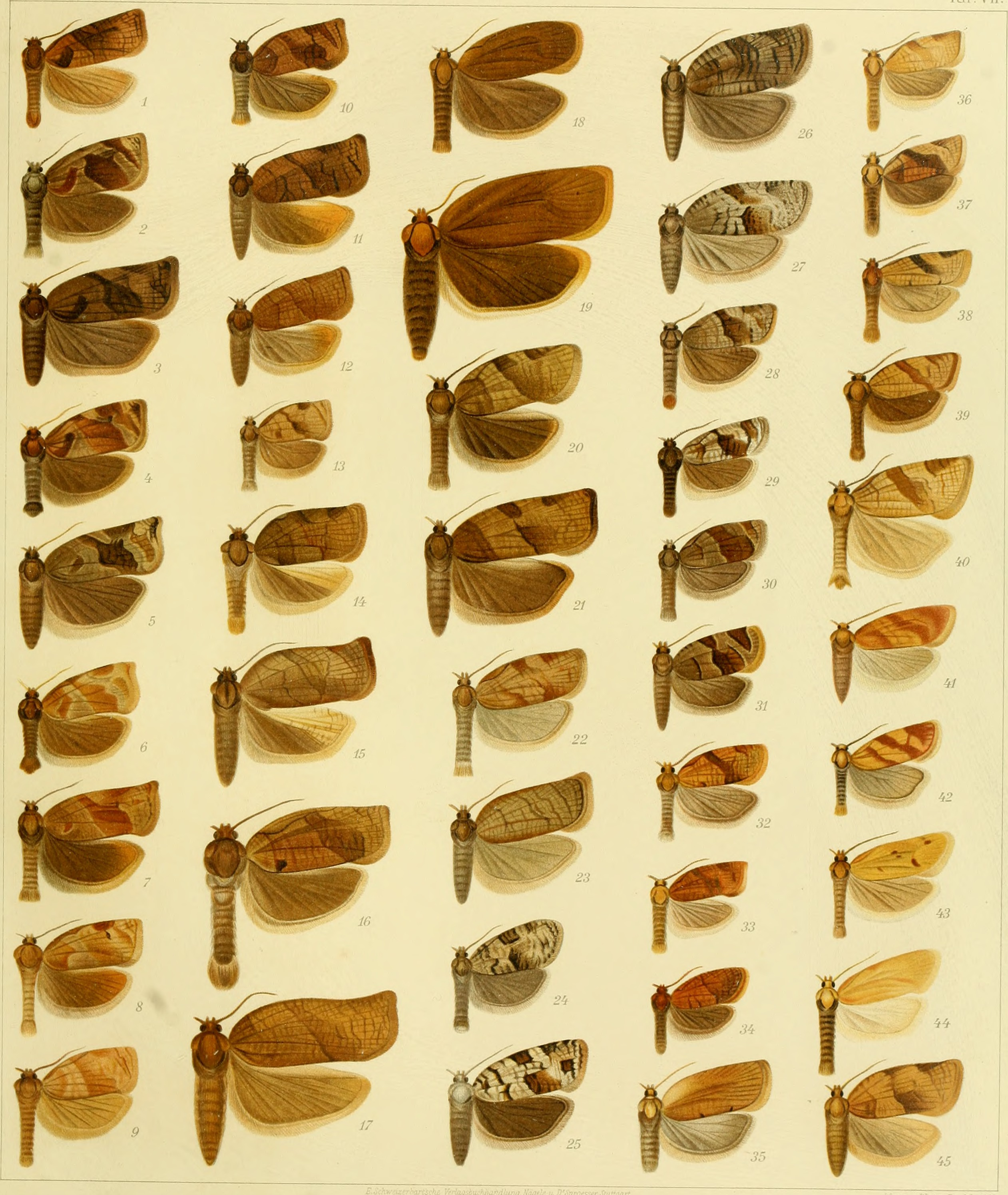
- Choristoneura lafauryana in Kennel Die palaearktischen tortriciden figures 20 male, 21 female

Scientific classification
- Domain: Eukaryota
- Kingdom: Animalia
- Phylum: Arthropoda
- Class: Insecta
- Order: Lepidoptera
- Family: Tortricidae
- Genus: Choristoneura
- Species: C. lafauryana

Binomial name
- Choristoneura lafauryana (Ragonot, 1875)

Synonyms
- Tortrix lafauryana Ragonot, 1875; Archips inornatanus Walsingham, 1900; Cacoecia lafauriana Kennel, 1910; Cacoecia laufauriana Kennel, in Spuler, 1910

= Choristoneura lafauryana =

Species of moth

Choristoneura lafauryana, the strawberry leafroller, is a species of moth of the family Tortricidae. It is found in Spain, Great Britain, the Netherlands, Belgium, France, Germany, Switzerland, Italy, Romania and Russia. In the east, the range extends to China (Heilongjiang, Jilin, Liaoning), Korea and Japan.

The wingspan is 18–21 mm for males and 20–24 mm for females. Adults have been recorded on wing from July to August in western Europe.

The larvae feed on Artemisia (including Artemisia montana), Cirsium, Lespedeza, Ribes, Myrica (including Myrica gale), Forsythia, Larix, Fragaria (including Fragaria x ananassa), Pyrus and Salix species, as well as Rhododendron tomentosa, Glycine max, Medicago sativa, Trifolium repens, Morella rubra, Boehmeria nivea, Malus pumila and Malus sylvestris.
