= Saint-Vincent-de-Paul, Landes =

Saint-Vincent-de-Paul
- Commune
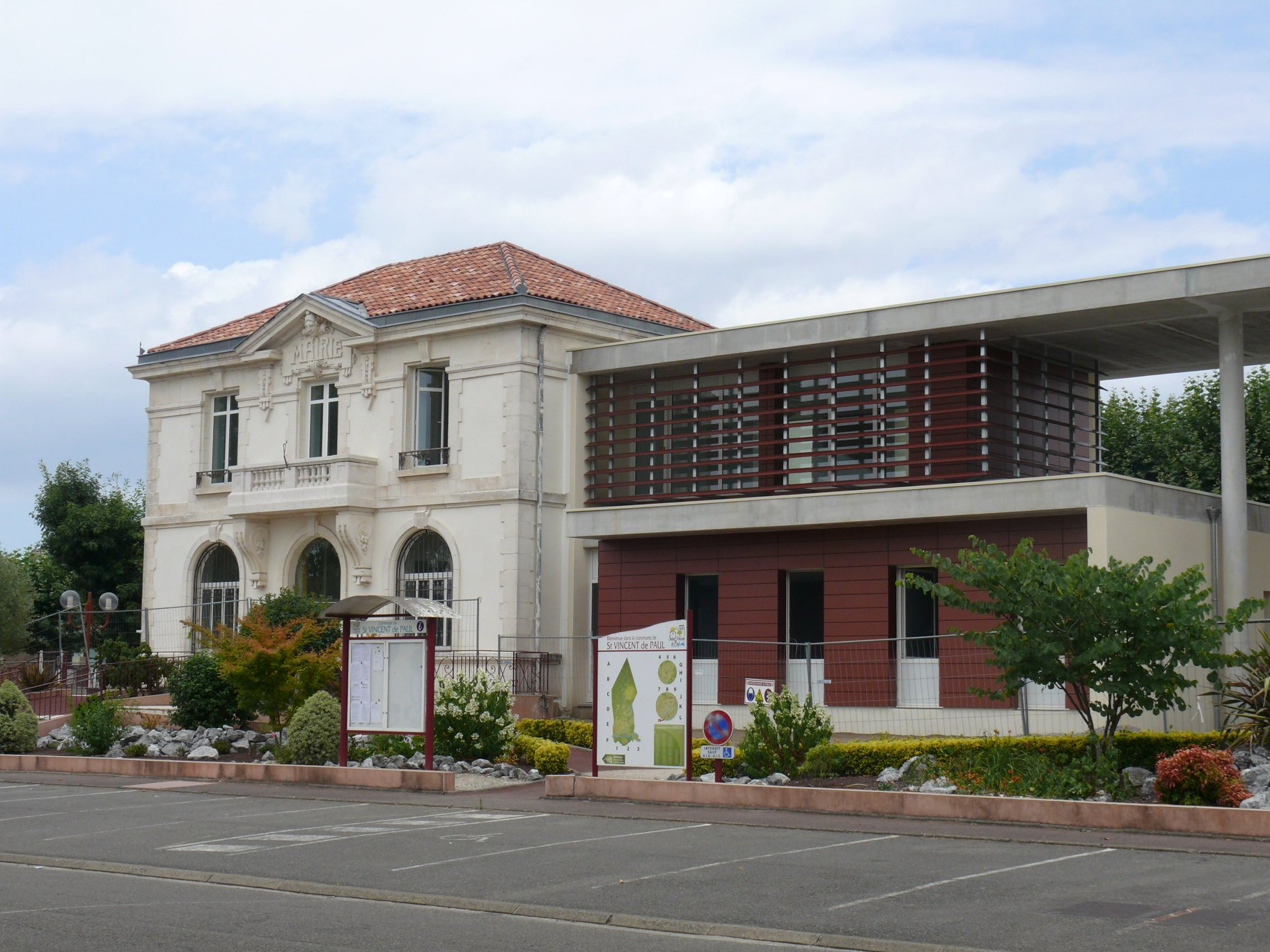
- Town hall
- Location of Saint-Vincent-de-Paul
- Location within France Location within Nouvelle-Aquitaine
- Coordinates: 43°44′52″N 0°59′51″W
- Country: France
- Region: Nouvelle-Aquitaine
- Department: Landes
- Arrondissement: Dax
- Canton: Dax-1
- Intercommunality: CA Grand Dax

Government
  - Mayor (2020–2026): Henri Bédat
- Area^{1}: 32.37 km^{2} (12.50 sq mi)
- Elevation: 23 m (75 ft)
- Highest elevation: 70 m (230 ft)
- Lowest elevation: 2 m (6.6 ft)
- Population (2023): 3,402
  - Density: 105.1/km^{2} (272.2/sq mi)
- Time zone: UTC+01:00 (CET)
  - Summer (DST): UTC+02:00 (CEST)
- INSEE/Postal code: 40283 /40990
- ^{1} French Land Register data, which excludes lakes, ponds, glaciers > 1 km^{2} (0.386 sq mi or 247 acres) and river estuaries.

Saint-Vincent-de-Paul (French pronunciation: [sɛ̃ vɛ̃sɑ̃ də pɔl]) (Occitan: Sent Vincenç de Pau) is a commune in Landes, a department in Nouvelle-Aquitaine in southwestern France.

The village was formerly called Pouy. It was renamed in 1828 after Saint Vincent de Paul, who was born there.

== Population ==
Historical population

Year	Pop.	±% p.a.
1793	445	—
1821	664	+1.44%
1846	1,011	+1.70%
1872	1,683	+1.98%
1901	1,664	−0.04%
1926	1,632	−0.08%
1946	1,489	−0.46%
1962	1,515	+0.11%
1968	1,557	+0.46%

Year	Pop.	±% p.a.
1975	1,584	+0.25%
1982	1,696	+0.98%
1990	1,775	+0.57%
1999	2,141	+2.10%
2007	2,896	+3.85%
2012	3,063	+1.13%
2017	3,126	+0.41%
2023	3,402	+1.42%

Source: EHESS and INSEE (1968-2023)

== See also ==
- Communes of the Landes department
