= Saint-Paul-lès-Dax =

- Commune
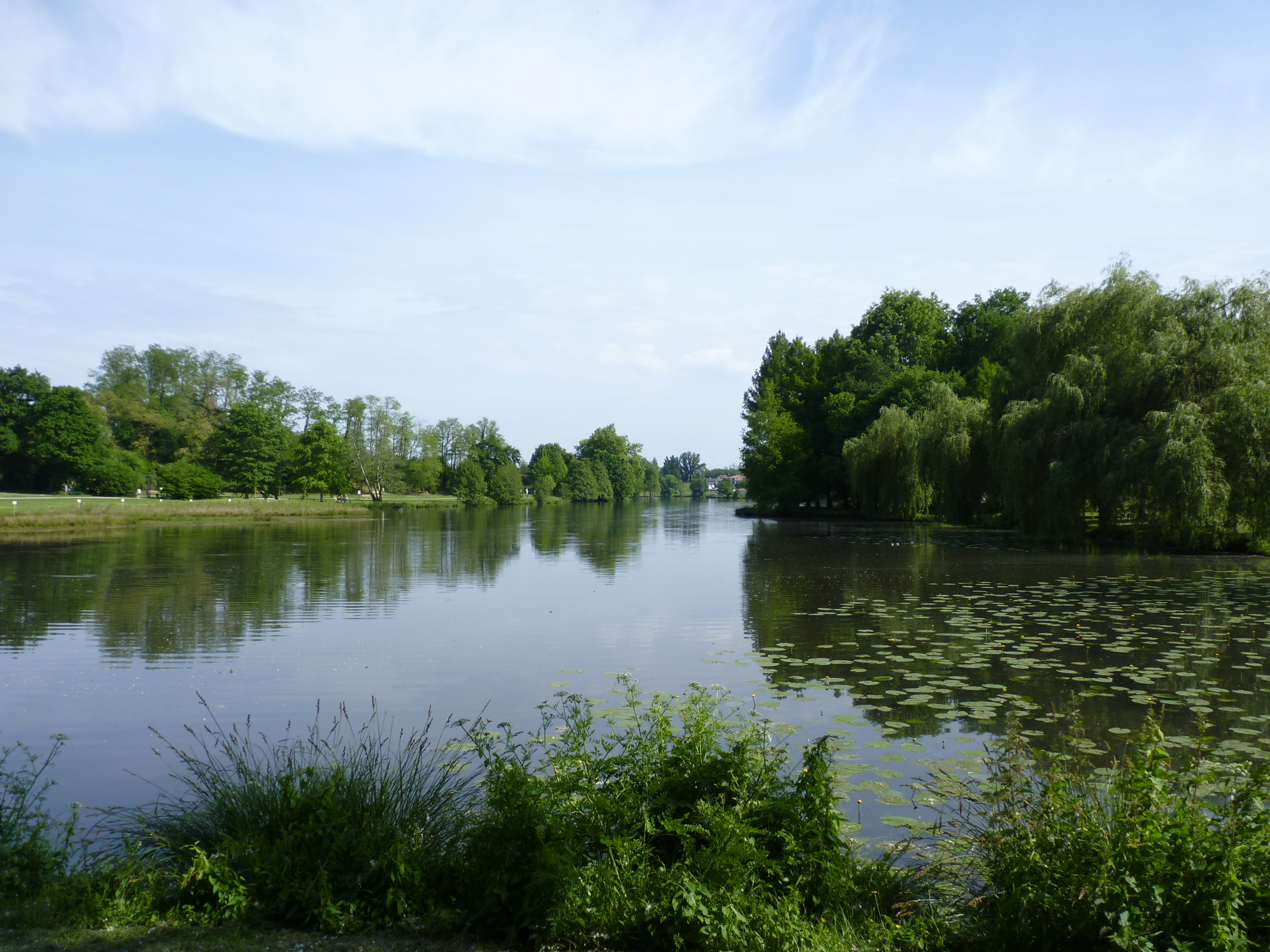
- Christus Lake

- Coat of arms
- Location of Saint-Paul-lès-Dax
- Location within France Location within Nouvelle-Aquitaine
- Coordinates: 43°43′35″N 1°03′06″W
- Country: France
- Region: Nouvelle-Aquitaine
- Department: Landes
- Arrondissement: Dax
- Canton: Dax-1
- Intercommunality: CA Grand Dax

Government
  - Mayor (2020–2026): Julien Bazus
- Area^{1}: 58.45 km^{2} (22.57 sq mi)
- Elevation: 22 m (72 ft)
- Highest elevation: 61 m (200 ft)
- Lowest elevation: 2 m (6.6 ft)
- Population (2023): 14,481
  - Density: 247.8/km^{2} (641.7/sq mi)
- Time zone: UTC+01:00 (CET)
  - Summer (DST): UTC+02:00 (CEST)
- INSEE/Postal code: 40279 /40990
- ^{1} French Land Register data, which excludes lakes, ponds, glaciers > 1 km^{2} (0.386 sq mi or 247 acres) and river estuaries.

Saint-Paul-lès-Dax (French pronunciation: [sɛ̃ pɔl lɛ daks], literally Saint-Paul near Dax; Gascon: Sent Pau d'Acs) is a commune in the Landes department in Nouvelle-Aquitaine in southwestern France.

== Population ==
Historical population

| Year | Pop. | ±% p.a. |
|---|---|---|
| 1793 | 1,013 | — |
| 1800 | 685 | −5.44% |
| 1806 | 1,078 | +7.85% |
| 1821 | 1,324 | +1.38% |
| 1831 | 1,708 | +2.58% |
| 1836 | 1,775 | +0.77% |
| 1841 | 2,027 | +2.69% |
| 1846 | 2,432 | +3.71% |
| 1851 | 3,022 | +4.44% |
| 1856 | 3,704 | +4.15% |
| 1861 | 2,817 | −5.33% |
| 1866 | 2,861 | +0.31% |
| 1872 | 3,019 | +0.90% |
| 1876 | 3,061 | +0.35% |
| 1881 | 3,240 | +1.14% |
| 1886 | 3,514 | +1.64% |
| 1891 | 3,614 | +0.56% |
| 1896 | 3,642 | +0.15% |
| 1901 | 3,720 | +0.42% |

| Year | Pop. | ±% p.a. |
|---|---|---|
| 1906 | 3,656 | −0.35% |
| 1911 | 3,948 | +1.55% |
| 1921 | 3,718 | −0.60% |
| 1926 | 3,870 | +0.80% |
| 1931 | 3,956 | +0.44% |
| 1936 | 4,025 | +0.35% |
| 1946 | 4,225 | +0.49% |
| 1954 | 4,316 | +0.27% |
| 1962 | 5,037 | +1.95% |
| 1968 | 5,795 | +2.36% |
| 1975 | 8,220 | +5.12% |
| 1982 | 9,028 | +1.35% |
| 1990 | 9,452 | +0.58% |
| 1999 | 10,226 | +0.88% |
| 2007 | 12,025 | +2.05% |
| 2012 | 13,139 | +1.79% |
| 2017 | 13,413 | +0.41% |
| 2023 | 14,481 | +1.29% |

Source: EHESS and INSEE (1968-2023)

== See also ==
- Communes of the Landes department
