= Bénesse-lès-Dax =

- Commune
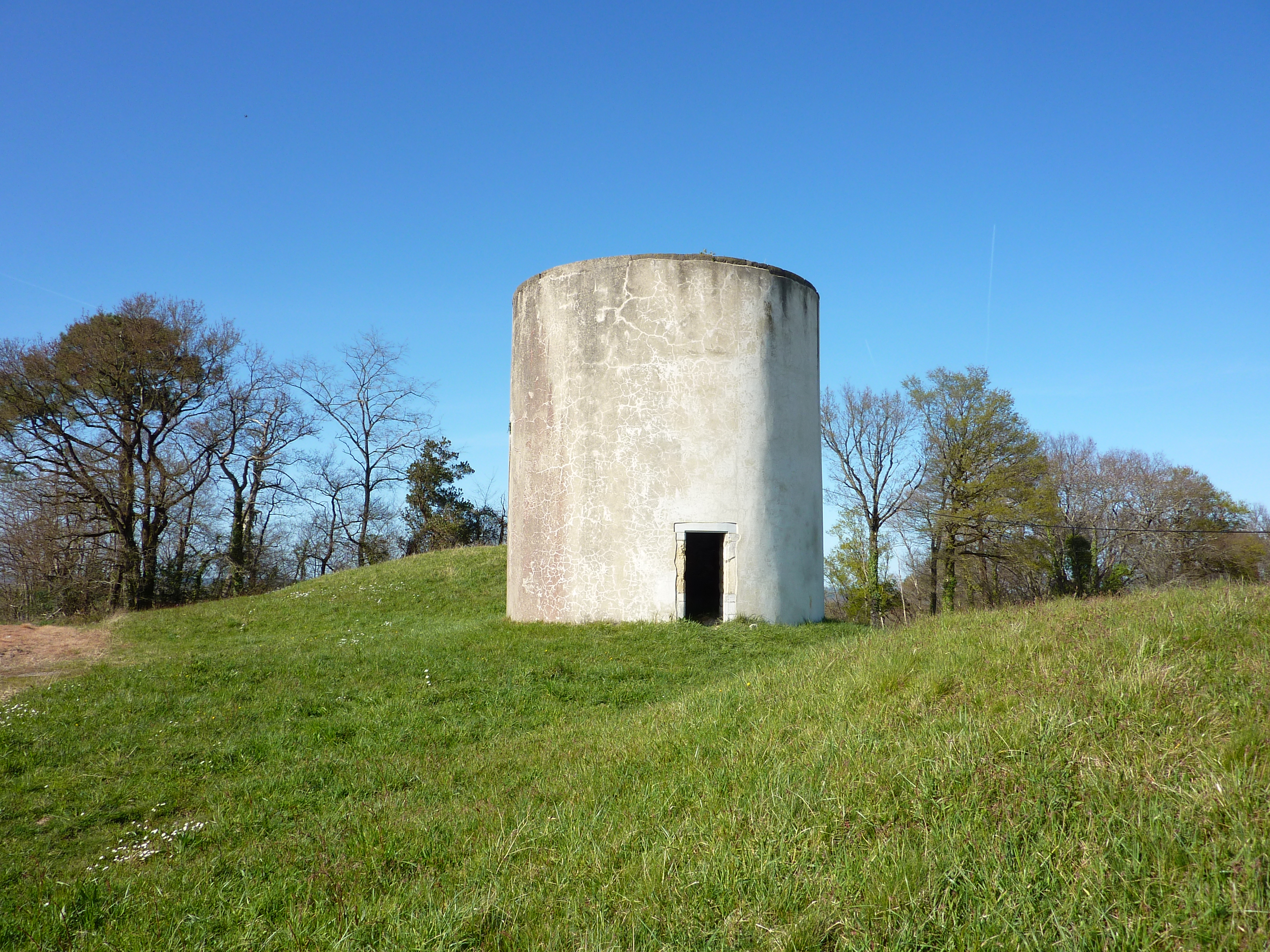
- Former windmill
- Location of Bénesse-lès-Dax
- Location within France Location within Nouvelle-Aquitaine
- Coordinates: 43°38′36″N 1°02′01″W
- Country: France
- Region: Nouvelle-Aquitaine
- Department: Landes
- Arrondissement: Dax
- Canton: Dax-2
- Intercommunality: CA Grand Dax

Government
  - Mayor (2020–2026): Jean-Marie Abadie
- Area^{1}: 5.89 km^{2} (2.27 sq mi)
- Elevation: 80 m (260 ft)
- Highest elevation: 96 m (315 ft)
- Lowest elevation: 21 m (69 ft)
- Population (2023): 598
  - Density: 102/km^{2} (263/sq mi)
- Time zone: UTC+01:00 (CET)
  - Summer (DST): UTC+02:00 (CEST)
- INSEE/Postal code: 40035 /40180
- ^{1} French Land Register data, which excludes lakes, ponds, glaciers > 1 km^{2} (0.386 sq mi or 247 acres) and river estuaries.

Bénesse-lès-Dax (French pronunciation: [benɛs lɛ daks], literally Bénesse near Dax; Occitan: Benessa d'Acs) is a commune in the Landes department in Nouvelle-Aquitaine in southwestern France.

== Population ==
Historical population
Year	Pop.	±% p.a.
1968	346	—
1975	335	−0.46%
1982	404	+2.71%
1990	399	−0.16%
1999	454	+1.45%
2007	502	+1.26%
2012	527	+0.98%
2017	529	+0.08%
2023	598	+2.06%
Source: INSEE

== See also ==
- Communes of the Landes department
