= Canton of Dax-2 =

Coordinates: 43.71°N 1.05°W

The canton of Dax-2 is an administrative division of the Landes department, southwestern France. It was created at the French canton reorganisation which came into effect in March 2015. Its seat is in Dax.

It consists of the following communes:

1. Bénesse-lès-Dax
2. Candresse
3. Dax (partly)
4. Heugas
5. Narrosse
6. Oeyreluy
7. Saint-Pandelon
8. Saugnac-et-Cambran
9. Seyresse
10. Yzosse
