= Communauté d'agglomération du Grand Dax =

Grand Dax
- Communauté d'agglomération
- Interactive map of Grand Dax
- Coordinates: 43°44′N 01°03′W
- Country: France
- Region: Nouvelle-Aquitaine
- Department: Landes
- No. of communes: {{{nbcomm}}}
- Established: 1993
- Area: 344.3 km^{2} (132.9 sq mi)
- Population (2019): 55,657
  - Density: 161.7/km^{2} (418.7/sq mi)
- Website: www.grand-dax.fr

Communauté d'agglomération du Grand Dax is the communauté d'agglomération, an intercommunal structure, centred on the town of Dax. It is located in the Landes department, in the Nouvelle-Aquitaine region, southwestern France. Created in 1993, its seat is in Dax. Its area is 344.3 km^{2}. Its population was 55,657 in 2019, of which 20,843 in Dax proper.

== Composition ==
The communauté d'agglomération consists of the following 20 communes:

1. Angoumé
2. Bénesse-lès-Dax
3. Candresse
4. Dax
5. Gourbera
6. Herm
7. Heugas
8. Mées
9. Narrosse
10. Oeyreluy
11. Rivière-Saas-et-Gourby
12. Saint-Pandelon
13. Saint-Paul-lès-Dax
14. Saint-Vincent-de-Paul
15. Saugnac-et-Cambran
16. Seyresse
17. Siest
18. Tercis-les-Bains
19. Téthieu
20. Yzosse
