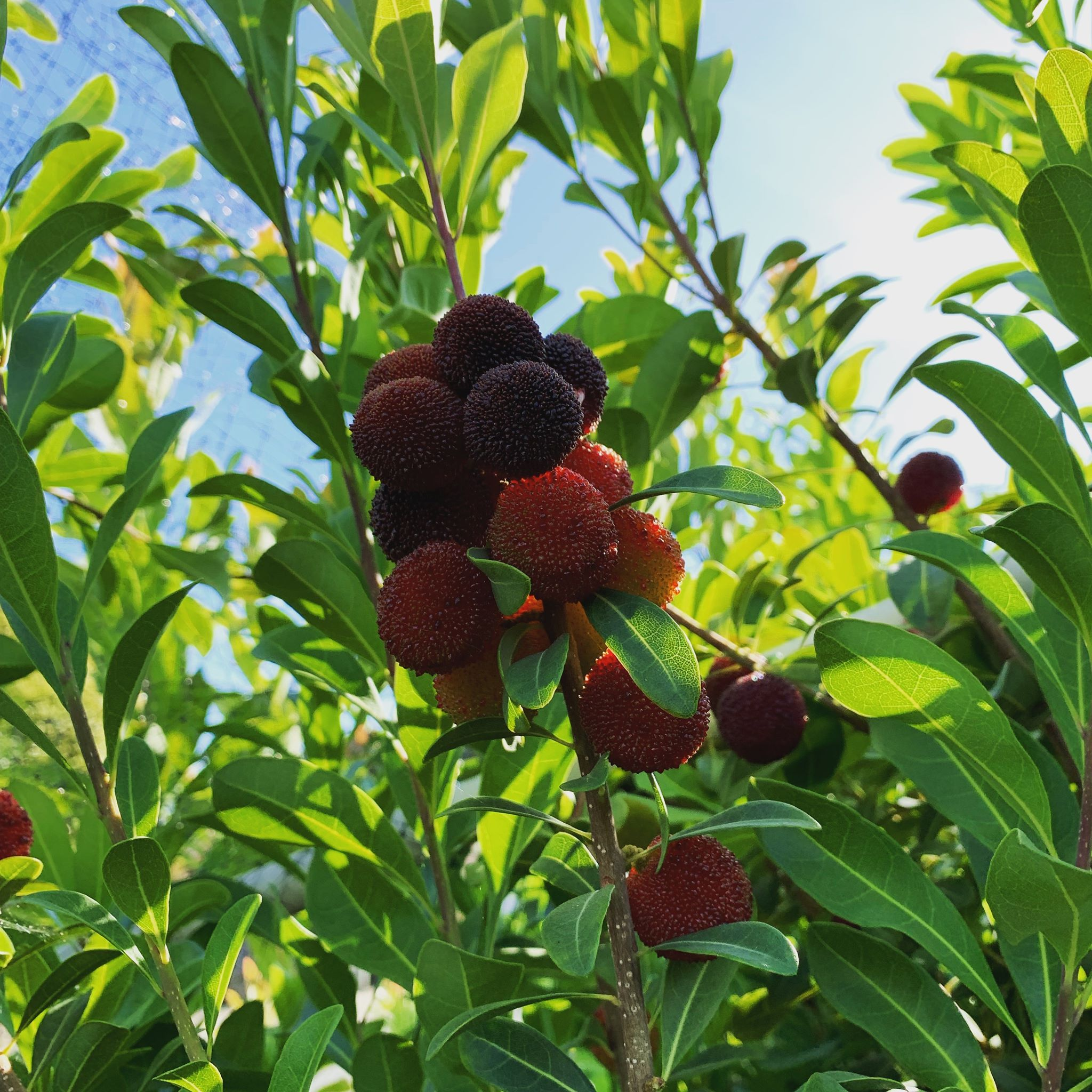
- Myrica rubra grown in Fremont, California

Scientific classification
- Kingdom: Plantae
- Clade: Tracheophytes
- Clade: Angiosperms
- Clade: Eudicots
- Clade: Rosids
- Order: Fagales
- Family: Myricaceae
- Genus: Myrica
- Species: M. rubra

Binomial name
- Myrica rubra (Lour.) Siebold & Zucc.

Synonyms
- Morella rubra Lour.; Morella rubra f. alba (Makino) Yonek.; Myrica rubra var. acuminata Nakai; Myrica rubra f. alba (Makino) Okuyama; Myrica rubra var. alba Makino

= Myrica rubra =

Species of fruit-bearing tree

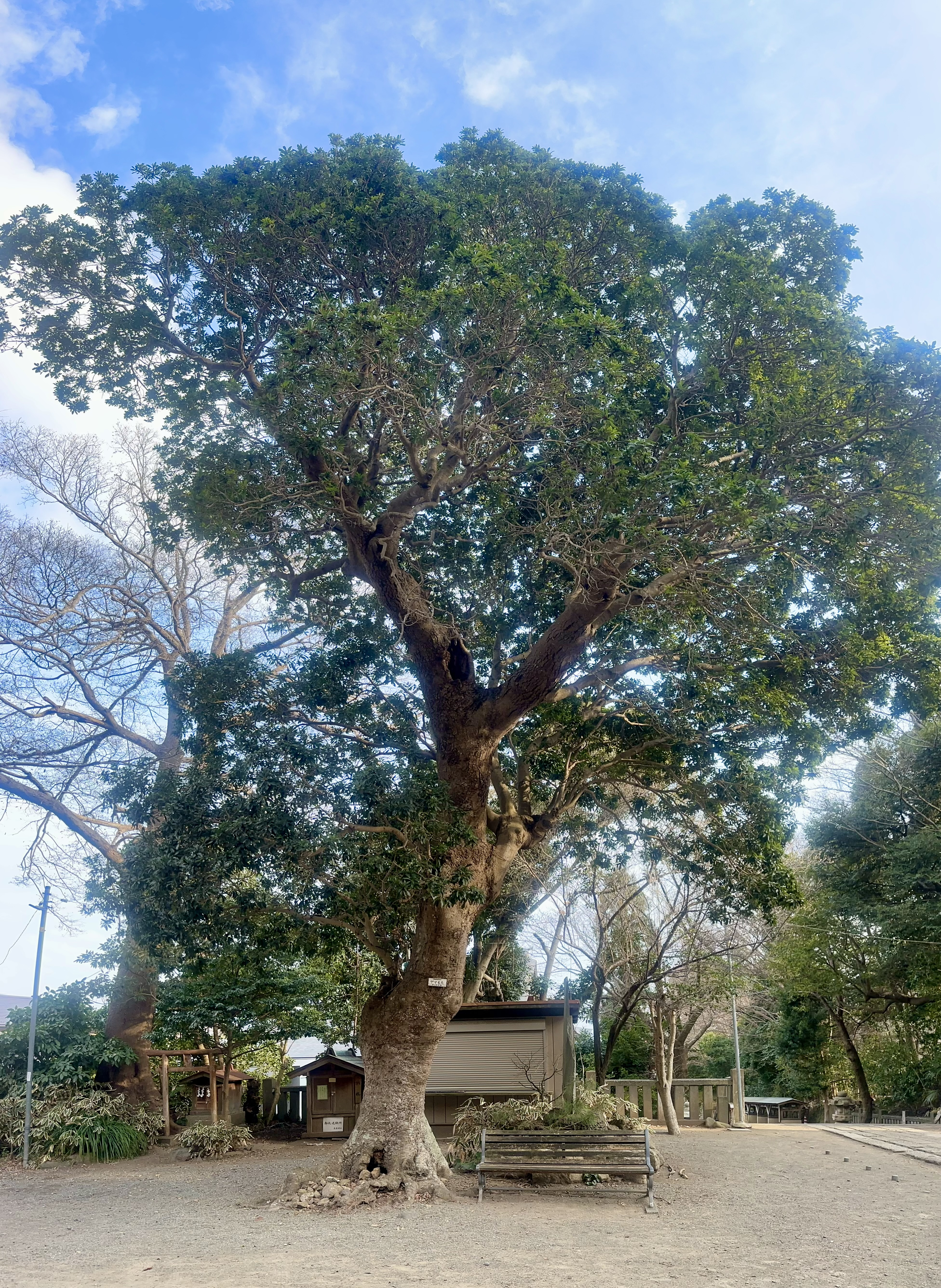
Large myrica rubra tree in Japan

Myrica rubra is a species of flowering plant in the family Myricaceae. A subtropical tree grown for its fruit, M. rubra is native to a region including southeastern China, Japan, Korea, the Philippines, and Taiwan.

The fruit, known as yangmei, yumberry or the Chinese bayberry, is favored for its juice and flavor.

== Common names ==
The tree and fruit have the common names yangmei (simplified Chinese: 杨梅; traditional Chinese: 楊梅; pinyin: yángméi; Cantonese: yeung4 mui4; Shanghainese: [ɦiɐ̃².mɛ⁴]), yamamomo (Japanese: ヤマモモ), Chinese bayberry, red bayberry, yumberry, waxberry, or Chinese strawberry.

== Description ==
Myrica rubra is an evergreen tree that grows to a height of up to 10–20 m (33–66 ft) high, with smooth gray bark and a uniform spherical to hemispherical crown. Leaves are leathery, bare, elliptic-obovate to oval lanceolate in shape, wedge-shaped at the base and rounded to pointed or tapered at the apex, margin is serrated or serrated in the upper half, with a length of 5–14 cm (2.0–5.5 in) and a width of 1–4 cm (0.39–1.57 in). Leaves are alternately arranged on the branches are divided into petiole and leaf blade. The petiole is 2–10 mm (0.079–0.394 in) long. The leaf underside is pale green and sparsely to moderately golden glandular, the top surface is dark green.

The species is dioecious. Male flowers with simple or unobtrusively branched bracts, are held in inflorescences individually or occasionally in groups of a few inflorescences in the leaf axils. Female flowers are 1–3 cm (0.39–1.18 in) long, in inflorescences with bare stems, the bracts almost circular with a diameter of about 1 millimeter, and have golden glands on the underside. The male flowers are accompanied by two to four egg-shaped, sparse lanceolate leaves. Each male flower contains four to six stamens with dark red, elliptical anthers.

Female inflorescences are single with multi-flowered spikes of 0.5–1.5 cm (0.20–0.59 in)in length standing in the leaf axils. The rhachis is hairy and glandular. The cover sheets overlap, are hairless and only unobtrusively glandular. Female flowers are accompanied by four leaves. The upper ovary is velvety hairy, with a stylus with a two-lobed scar. There are two slender scar lobes that are colored bright red.

The flowering period extends from March to April in China, with fruits developing from May to June. The fruit is spherical, typically 1.5–2.5 cm (0.6–1 in) in diameter, with diameters up to 3 centimeters, and a knobby surface. The surface is a thick-skinned, typically a crimson red, but may vary from white to purple, with similar or somewhat lighter flesh color. At the center is a single seed, with a diameter about half that of the whole fruit. The flesh is sweet and very tart.

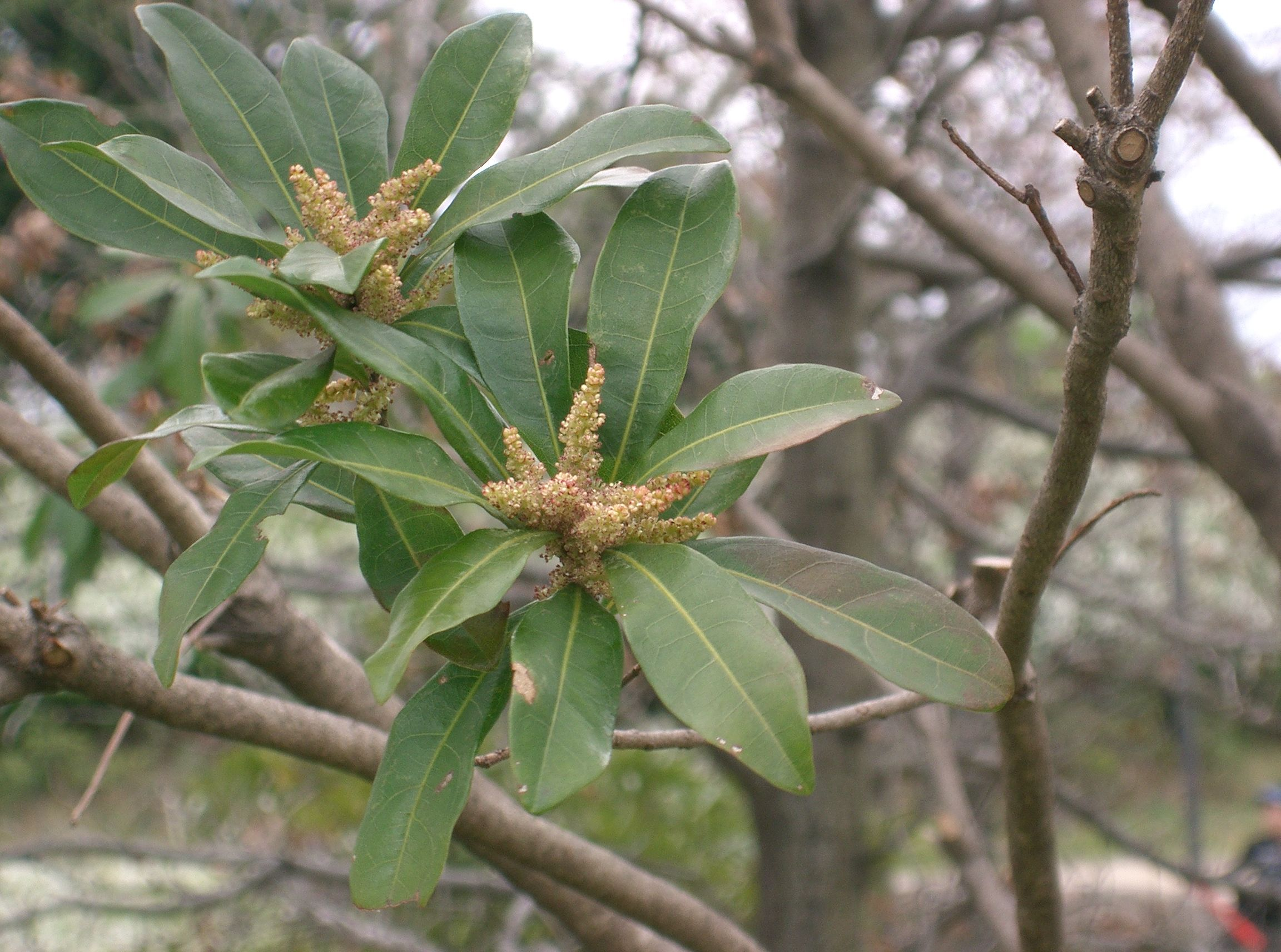
Flowers

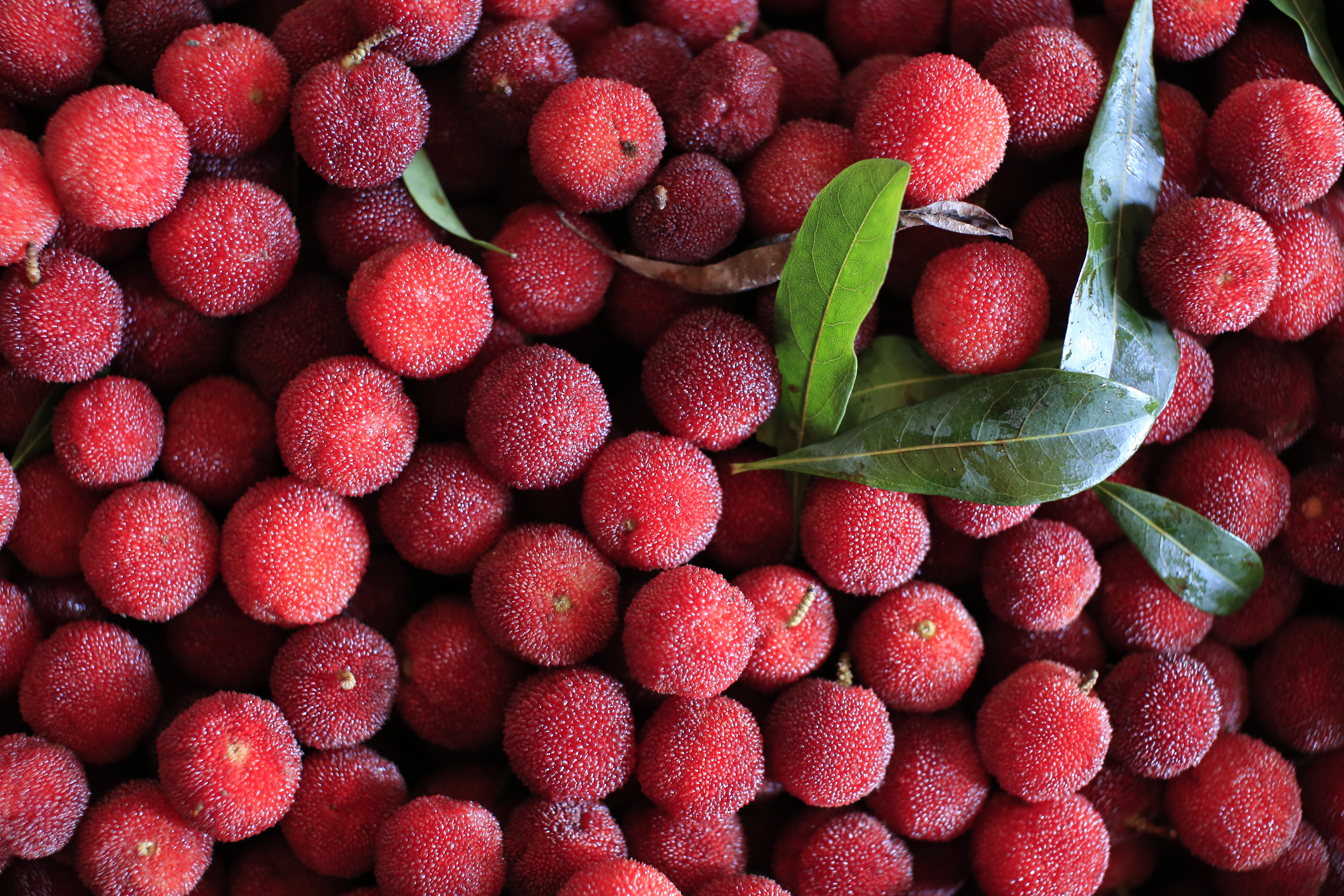
Fruit

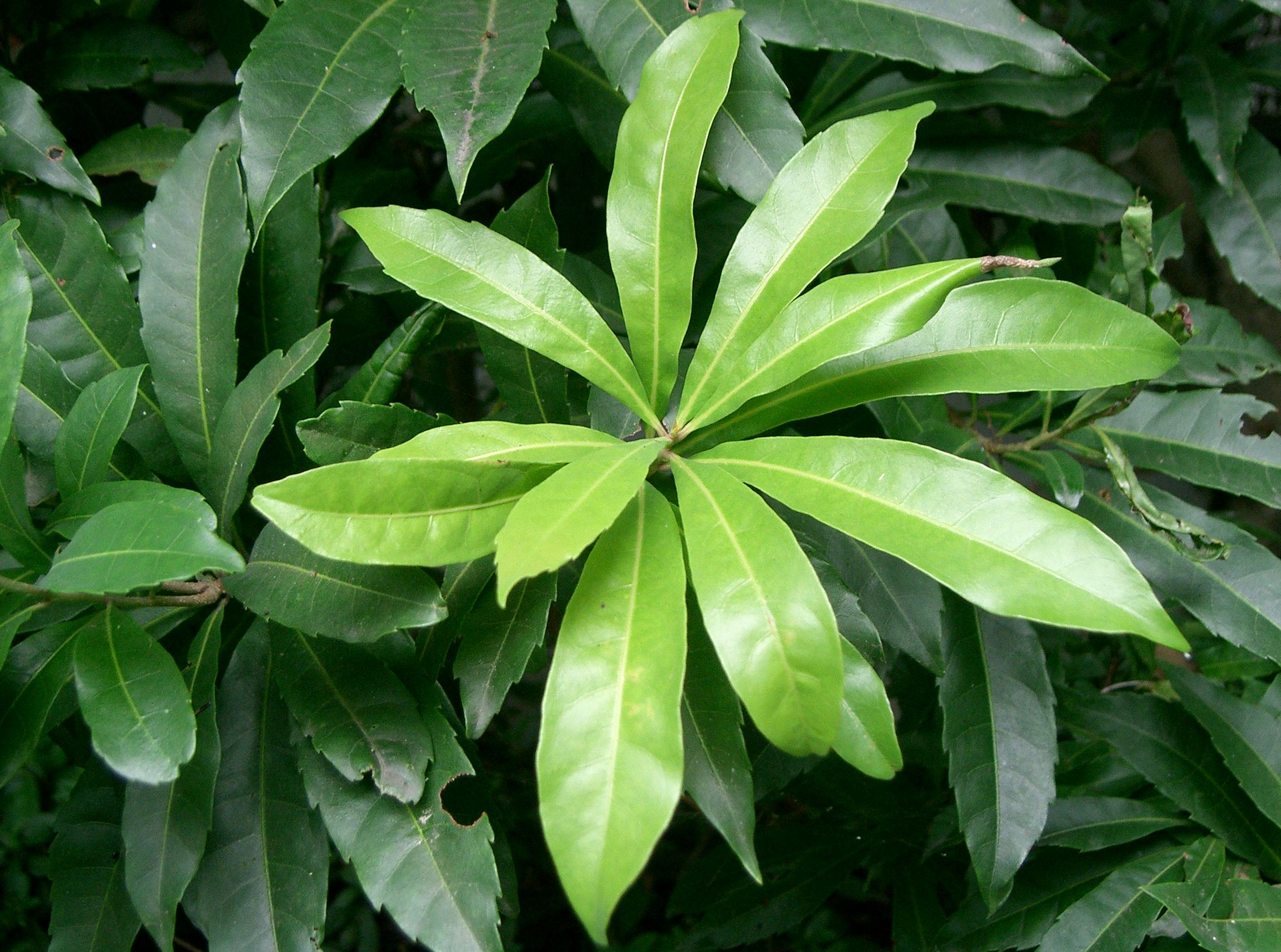
Leaves

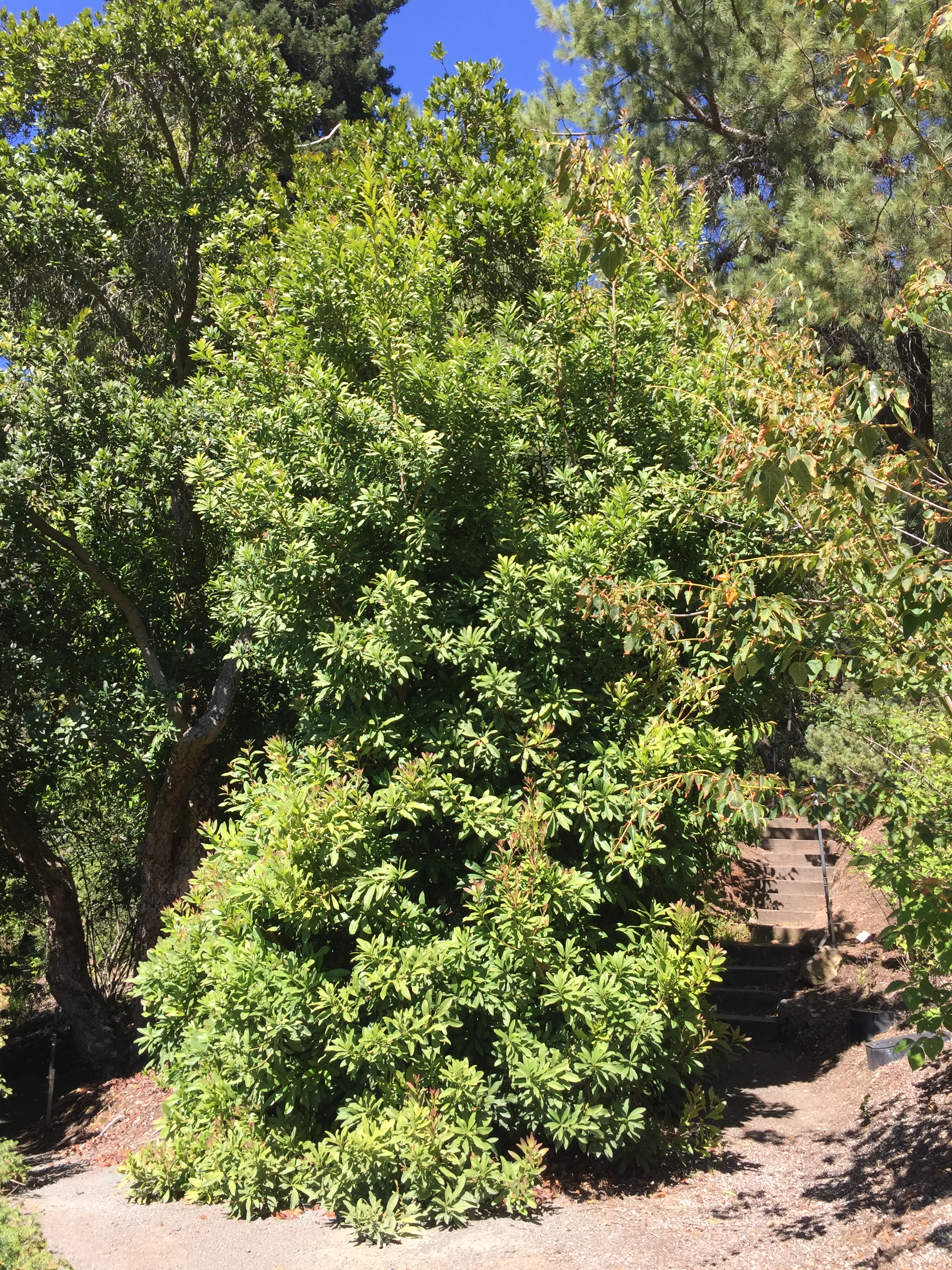
Tree

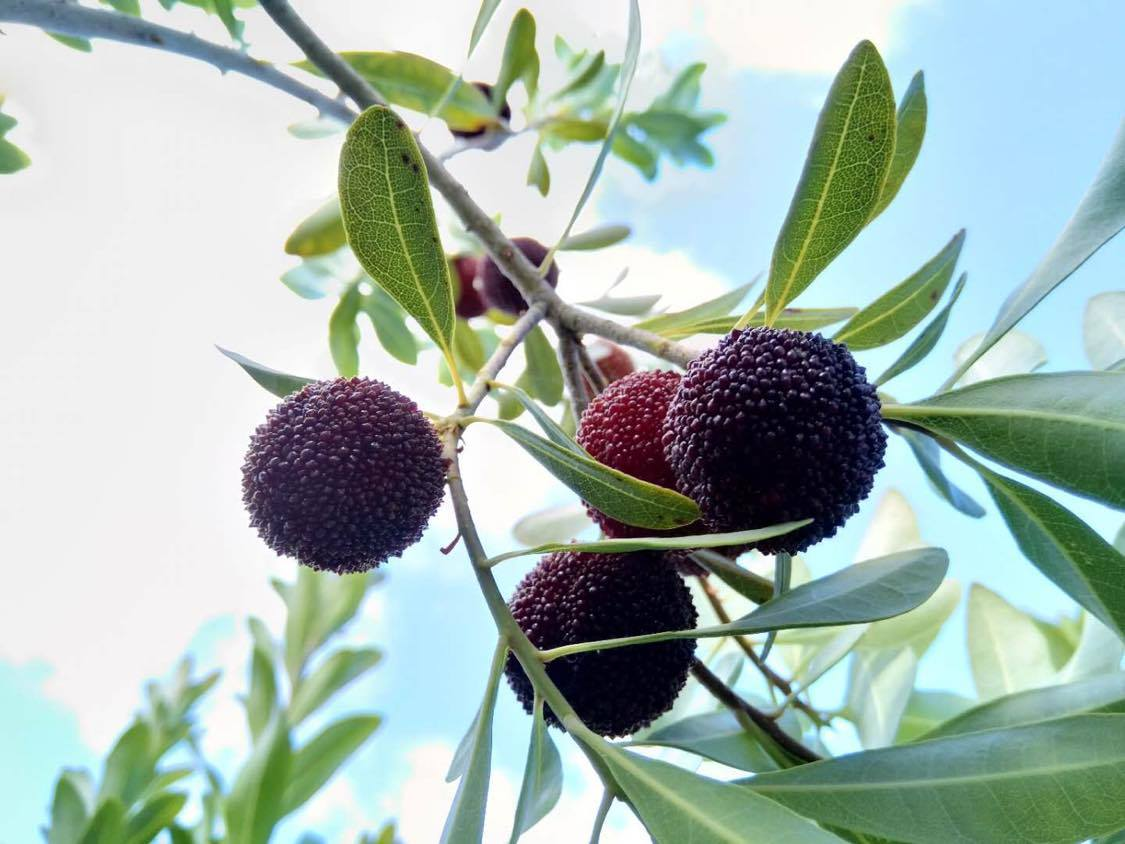
Ripe fruit

== Taxonomy ==
The plant was first described by João de Loureiro in Flora Cochinchinensis, 2, page 548 in 1790 under the name (basionym) Morella rubra. The species was moved to the genus Myrica as Myrica rubra (Lour.) Siebold & Zucc. by Philipp Franz von Siebold and Joseph Gerhard von Zuccarini in treatises of the Bavarian Academy of Sciences. Mathematical and natural science class, volume 4, number 3, page 230 published.

In studies of germplasm, it was clearly distinguished from wax myrtle, and could be subdivided into two groups unrelated to the sex of the plant, but more so by the geographic region in China where the accession originated. Among regions in China, accessions varied within regions, indicating extensive gene mixing. Nearly 100 cultivars of M. rubra exist in China alone. Zhejiang Province is a possible center of diversity for the plant in China.

The chromosome count is 2n = 16.

== Distribution and habitat ==
It is native to eastern Asia, mainly in south-central China in province of Fujian, Guangdong, Guangxi, Guizhou, Hainan, Hunan, Jiangsu, Jiangxi, Sichuan, Yunnan, and Zhejiang; Japan, Korea, and the Philippines in forests on mountain slopes and valleys at elevations of 100–1,500 metres (330–4,920 ft). Seeds are dispersed by Japanese macaques and Yakushima macaques.

== Cultivation ==
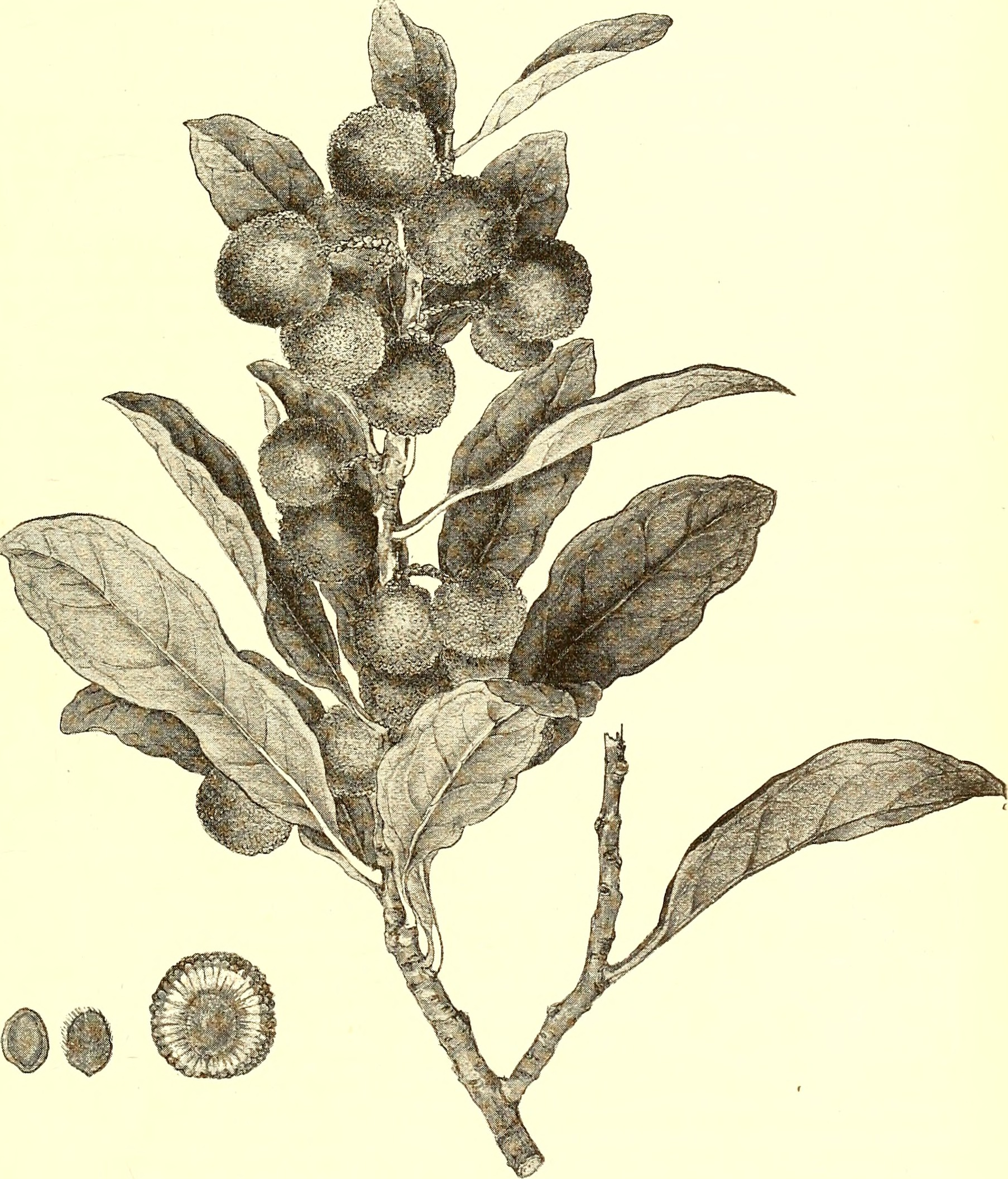
M. rubra plate from The American Garden 1873

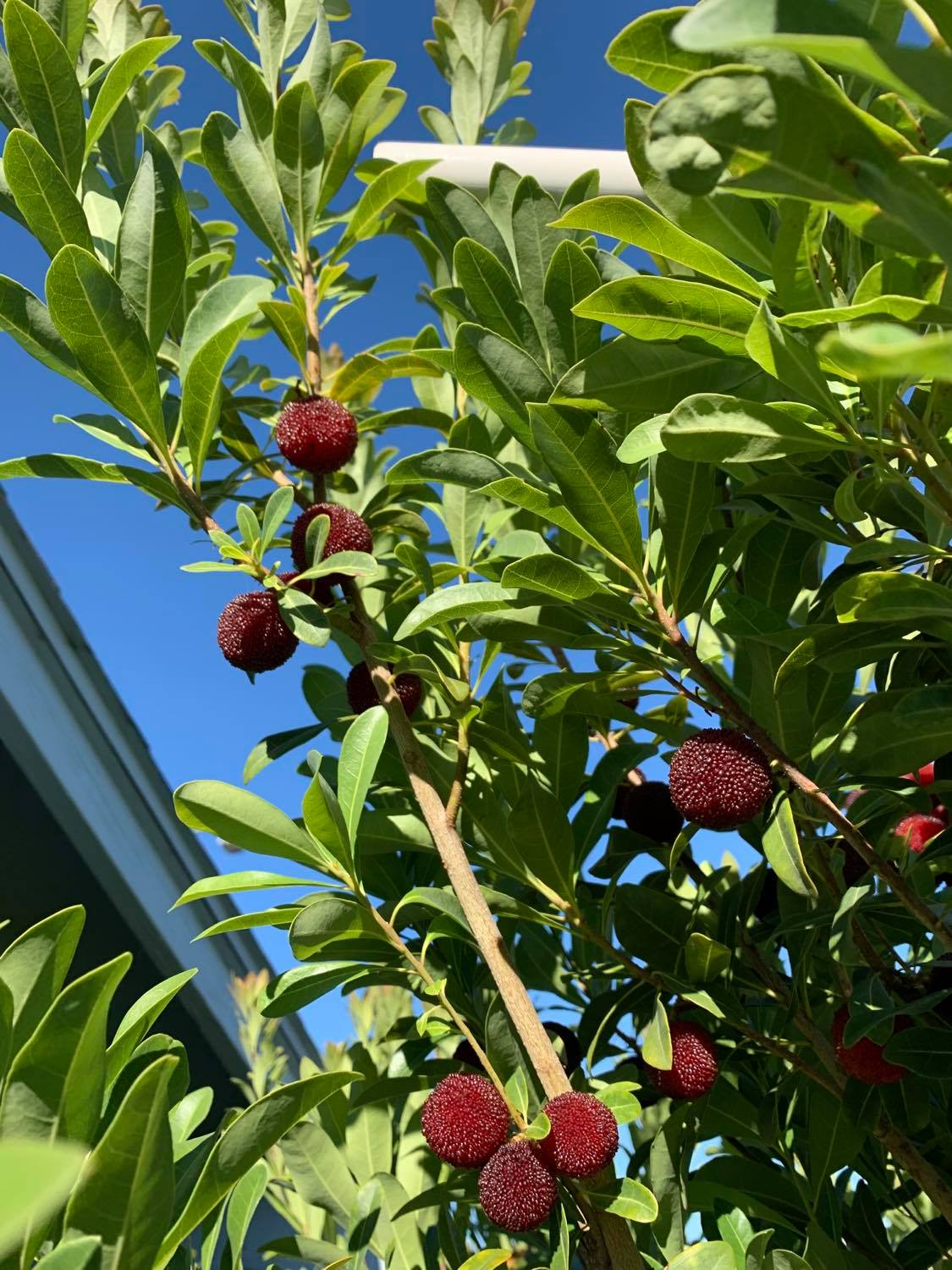
M. rubra grown in Fremont, California

Chinese cultivation is concentrated south of the Yangtze River, where it has considerable economic importance and has been grown for at least 2000 years.

It tolerates poor acidic soils. The root system is 5–60 cm (2.0–23.6 in) deep, with no obvious taproot.

Myrica rubra was first introduced into the United States by Frank Nicholas Meyer from seed purchased from the Yokohama Nursery Co. in Japan and published in the Bulletin of Foreign Plant Introductions in 1918. University of Georgia Woody Plant Research Lab has introduced and researched on this species since 2012. The lab's research includes propagation challenges, hormone signaling pathways in the fruit's development, and identifying new landscape cultivars for commercial and ornamental use. Plants from the collection were grown and fruited in Chico, California and in Brooksville, Florida by David Fairchild. M. rubra is being commercialized in California by Calmei, a California corporation. Trees are prolific producers, with a single tree yielding some 100 kilograms (220 lb) of fruit. In 2025, tissue culture Myrica rubra plants are available on the USA market. It may significantly improve the yangmei industry in United States by providing the high quality plants in container, compare to the risk of low survival rates of importing bare root plants. As of 2007, 865,000 acres were devoted to yangmei production in China – double the amount of acres utilized in apple production in the United States.

The tree is used as ornaments for parks and streets. It is also a traditional tree used in composing classical East Asian gardens.

=== Products ===
Some cultivars with large fruit, up to 4 centimetres (1.6 in) in diameter, have been developed. Besides fresh consumption, the fruits may be dried, canned, soaked in baijiu (Chinese liquor), or fermented into alcoholic beverages, such as wine, beer, or cocktails. In Yunnan Province in China, there are two main types of yangmei – a sour type used for making dried fruit, and a sweet type used for juice and fresh eating.

In the Philippines, they are dried and preserved in brine and vinegar and made into champóy, the local version of the Chinese huamei.

Other uses include bottled pasteurized juice or juice blends, blended jam and preserves. It can also be used to make a dye prepared from the bark.

=== Research and phytochemicals ===
Various species of Myrica have been studied scientifically for horticultural characteristics or its phytochemicals. Dating to 1951, the horticultural literature includes studies on nitrogen-fixing ability of the root nodules system, the presence of Frankia bacteria having nitrogen-fixing properties in root nodules, and microbial characteristics of the subcanopy soil.

It has also been assessed for its niche characteristics in the forest environment, and growth of pollen tubes.

== Cultural significance ==
Archaeological and written evidence suggest that yangmei cultivation first took place in China over 2,000 years ago during the Han dynasty. Yangmei is mentioned throughout Chinese literature, including several appearances in Li Bai's poems.

In Japan, yamamomo (山桃, lit. 'mountain peach') is the prefectural flower of Kōchi and the prefectural tree of Tokushima. The plant's name appears in many old Japanese poems.
