= Saugnac-et-Cambran =

- Commune
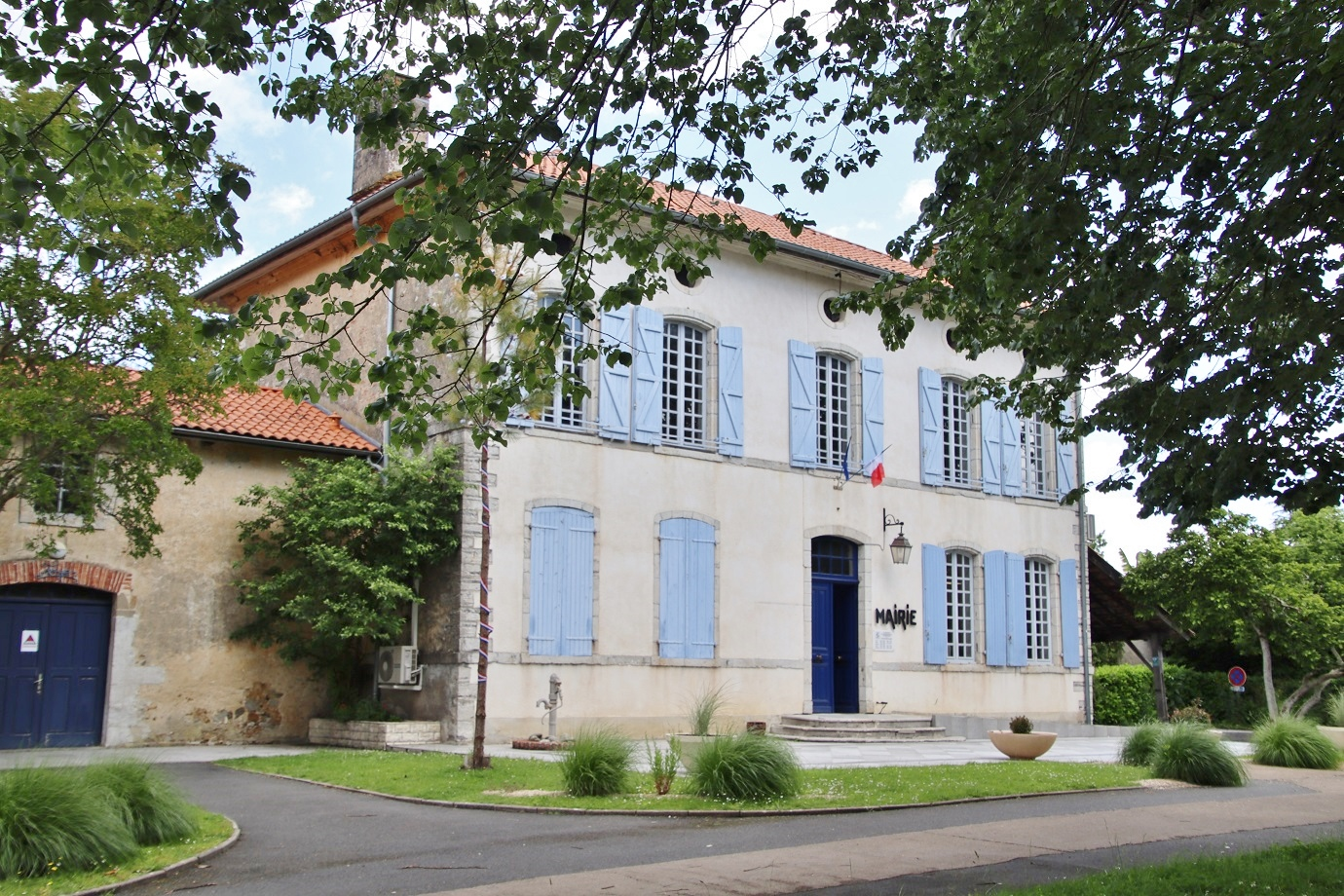
- Saugnac-et-Cambran Town hall
- Location of Saugnac-et-Cambran
- Location within France Location within Nouvelle-Aquitaine
- Coordinates: 43°40′18″N 0°59′30″W
- Country: France
- Region: Nouvelle-Aquitaine
- Department: Landes
- Arrondissement: Dax
- Canton: Dax-2
- Intercommunality: CA Grand Dax

Government
  - Mayor (2020–2026): Alain Bergeras
- Area^{1}: 13.28 km^{2} (5.13 sq mi)
- Elevation: 22 m (72 ft)
- Highest elevation: 77 m (253 ft)
- Lowest elevation: 4 m (13 ft)
- Population (2023): 1,560
  - Density: 117/km^{2} (304/sq mi)
- Time zone: UTC+01:00 (CET)
  - Summer (DST): UTC+02:00 (CEST)
- INSEE/Postal code: 40294 /40180
- ^{1} French Land Register data, which excludes lakes, ponds, glaciers > 1 km^{2} (0.386 sq mi or 247 acres) and river estuaries.

Saugnac-et-Cambran (French pronunciation: [soɲak e kɑ̃bʁɑ̃]; Occitan: Saunhac e Cambran) is a commune in the Landes department in Nouvelle-Aquitaine in southwestern France.

== Population ==
Historical population
Year	Pop.	±% p.a.
1968	824	—
1975	941	+1.91%
1982	1,011	+1.03%
1990	1,253	+2.72%
1999	1,269	+0.14%
2007	1,526	+2.33%
2012	1,653	+1.61%
2017	1,542	−1.38%
2023	1,560	+0.19%
Source: INSEE

== See also ==
- Communes of the Landes department
