= Angoumé =

- Commune
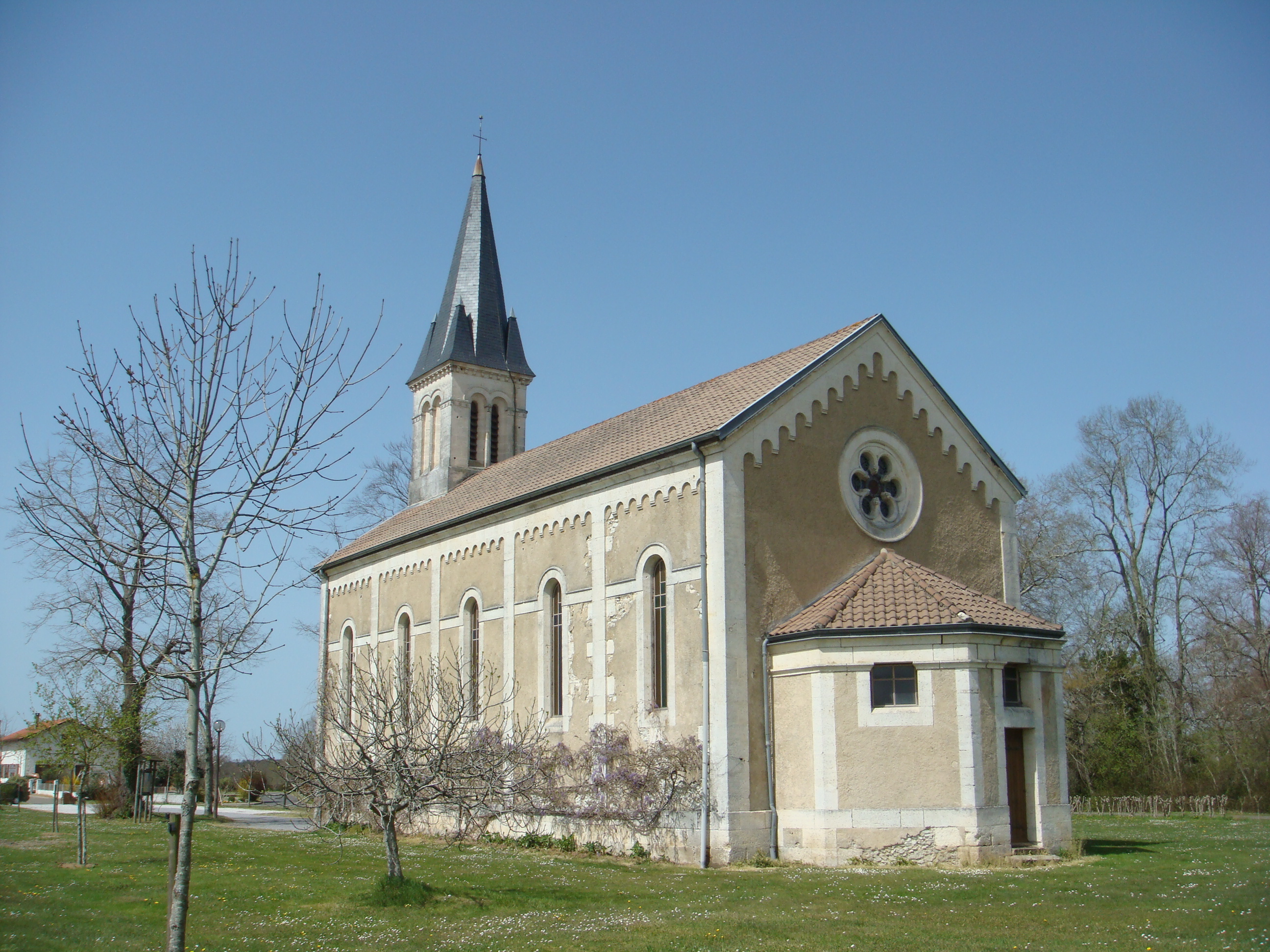
- The church of Angoumé
- Location of Angoumé
- Location within France Location within Nouvelle-Aquitaine
- Coordinates: 43°41′21″N 1°08′09″W
- Country: France
- Region: Nouvelle-Aquitaine
- Department: Landes
- Arrondissement: Dax
- Canton: Dax-1
- Intercommunality: CA Grand Dax

Government
  - Mayor (2020–2026): Véronique Audouy
- Area^{1}: 7.83 km^{2} (3.02 sq mi)
- Elevation: 56 m (184 ft)
- Highest elevation: 57 m (187 ft)
- Lowest elevation: 2 m (6.6 ft)
- Population (2023): 261
  - Density: 33.3/km^{2} (86.3/sq mi)
- Time zone: UTC+01:00 (CET)
  - Summer (DST): UTC+02:00 (CEST)
- INSEE/Postal code: 40003 /40990
- ^{1} French Land Register data, which excludes lakes, ponds, glaciers > 1 km^{2} (0.386 sq mi or 247 acres) and river estuaries.

Angoumé (French pronunciation: [ɑ̃ɡume]; Gascon: En Gomèr) is a commune of the Landes department in Nouvelle-Aquitaine in southwestern France.

== Population ==
Historical population
Year	Pop.	±% p.a.
1968	136	—
1975	111	−2.86%
1982	118	+0.88%
1990	103	−1.69%
1999	179	+6.33%
2007	235	+3.46%
2012	295	+4.65%
2017	281	−0.97%
2023	261	−1.22%
Source: INSEE

== See also ==
- Communes of the Landes department
