= Saint-Barthélemy, Landes =

Saint-Barthélemy
- Commune
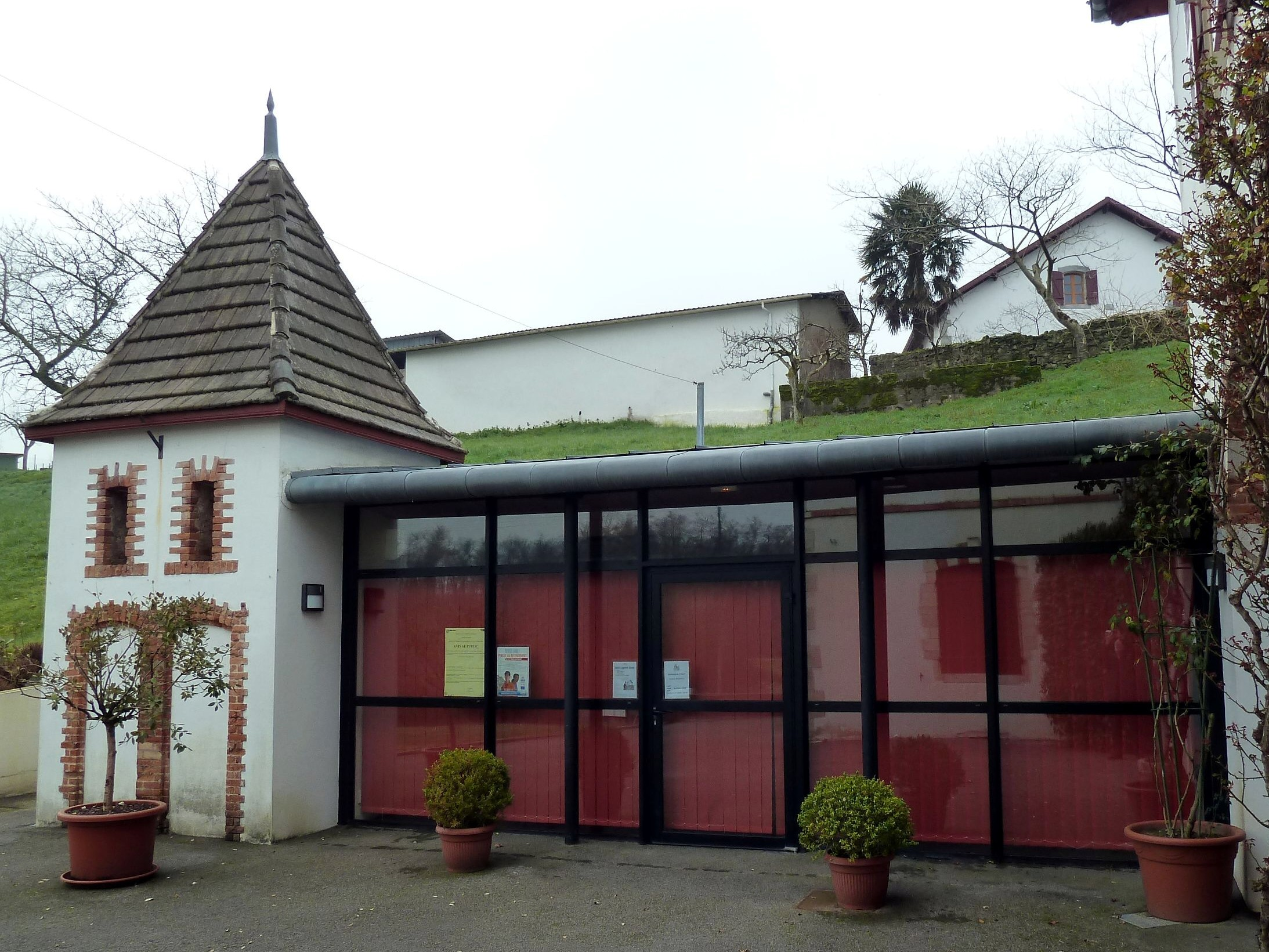
- Town hall
- Location of Saint-Barthélemy
- Location within France Location within Nouvelle-Aquitaine
- Coordinates: 43°30′54″N 1°19′49″W
- Country: France
- Region: Nouvelle-Aquitaine
- Department: Landes
- Arrondissement: Dax
- Canton: Seignanx
- Intercommunality: Seignanx

Government
  - Mayor (2024–2026): Sabrina Cachenaut
- Area^{1}: 5.66 km^{2} (2.19 sq mi)
- Elevation: 18 m (59 ft)
- Highest elevation: 71 m (233 ft)
- Lowest elevation: 0 m (0 ft)
- Population (2023): 412
  - Density: 72.8/km^{2} (189/sq mi)
- Time zone: UTC+01:00 (CET)
  - Summer (DST): UTC+02:00 (CEST)
- INSEE/Postal code: 40251 /40390
- ^{1} French Land Register data, which excludes lakes, ponds, glaciers > 1 km^{2} (0.386 sq mi or 247 acres) and river estuaries.

Saint-Barthélemy (French pronunciation: [sɛ̃ baʁtelemi]; Occitan: Sent Bertomiu) is a commune in the Landes department in Nouvelle-Aquitaine in southwestern France.

== Population ==
Historical population
Year	Pop.	±% p.a.
1968	151	—
1975	139	−1.18%
1982	156	+1.66%
1990	183	+2.02%
1999	236	+2.87%
2007	338	+4.59%
2012	387	+2.74%
2017	422	+1.75%
2023	412	−0.40%
Source: INSEE

== See also ==
- Communes of the Landes department
