= Biarrotte =

- Commune
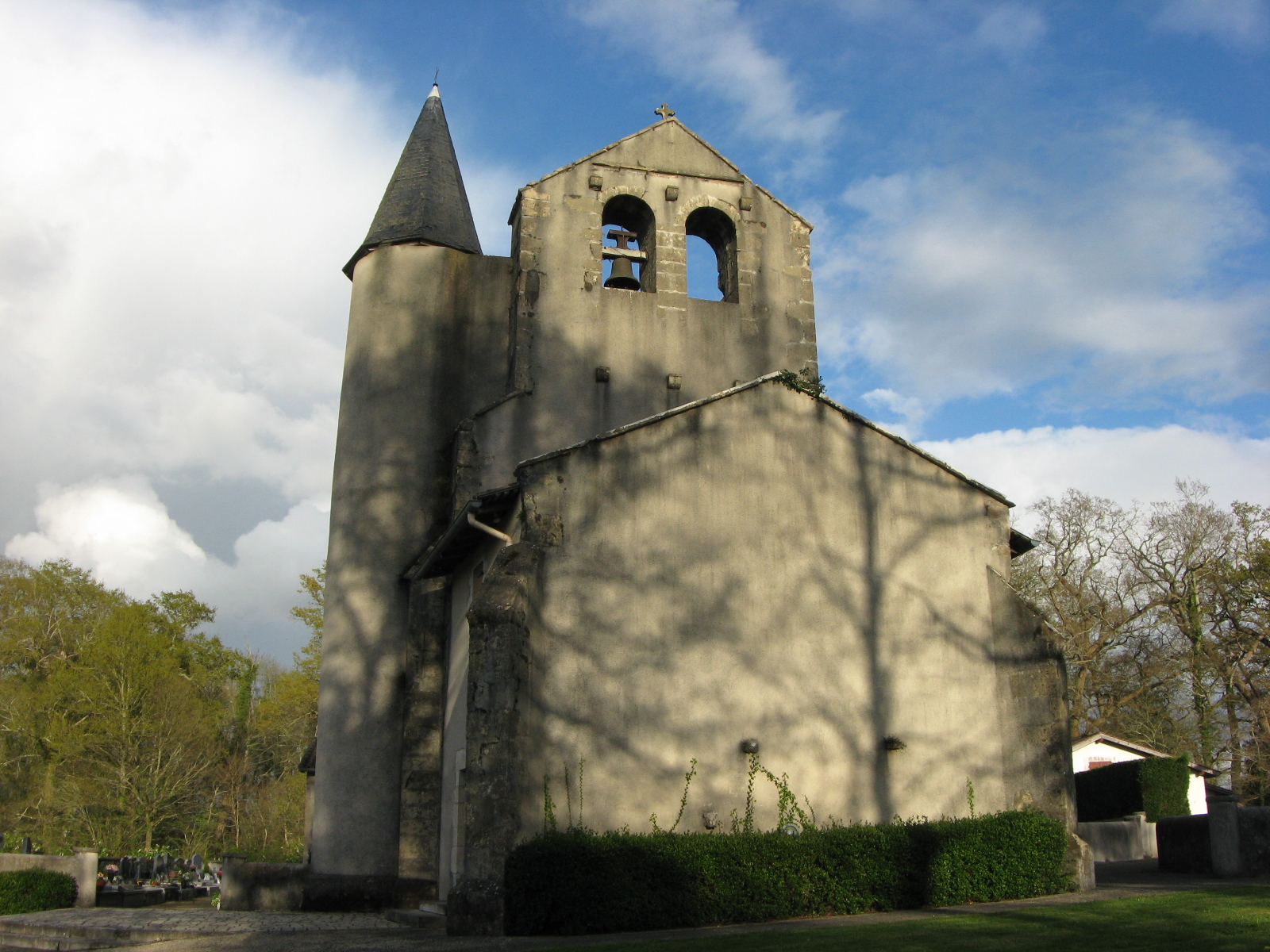
- Location of Biarrotte
- Location within France Location within Nouvelle-Aquitaine
- Coordinates: 43°33′43″N 1°16′15″W
- Country: France
- Region: Nouvelle-Aquitaine
- Department: Landes
- Arrondissement: Dax
- Canton: Seignanx

Government
  - Mayor (2020–2026): Hervé Segui
- Area^{1}: 4.9 km^{2} (1.9 sq mi)
- Elevation: 40 m (130 ft)
- Highest elevation: 55 m (180 ft)
- Lowest elevation: 8 m (26 ft)
- Population (2023): 347
  - Density: 71/km^{2} (180/sq mi)
- Time zone: UTC+01:00 (CET)
  - Summer (DST): UTC+02:00 (CEST)
- INSEE/Postal code: 40042 /40390
- ^{1} French Land Register data, which excludes lakes, ponds, glaciers > 1 km^{2} (0.386 sq mi or 247 acres) and river estuaries.

Biarrotte (French pronunciation: [bjaʁɔt]; Occitan: Biarròta) is a commune in the Landes department in Nouvelle-Aquitaine in southwestern France.

== Population ==
Historical population
Year	Pop.	±% p.a.
1968	163	—
1975	179	+1.35%
1982	211	+2.38%
1990	206	−0.30%
1999	226	+1.03%
2007	243	+0.91%
2012	270	+2.13%
2017	289	+1.37%
2023	347	+3.10%
Source: INSEE

== See also ==
- Communes of the Landes department
