= Cantons of the Landes department =

The following is a list of the 15 cantons of the Landes department, in France, following the French canton reorganisation which came into effect in March 2015:

- Adour Armagnac
- Chalosse Tursan
- Côte d'Argent
- Coteau de Chalosse
- Dax-1
- Dax-2
- Grands Lacs
- Haute Lande Armagnac
- Marensin Sud
- Mont-de-Marsan-1
- Mont-de-Marsan-2
- Orthe et Arrigans
- Pays morcenais tarusate
- Pays Tyrossais
- Seignanx
