= Biaudos =

- Commune
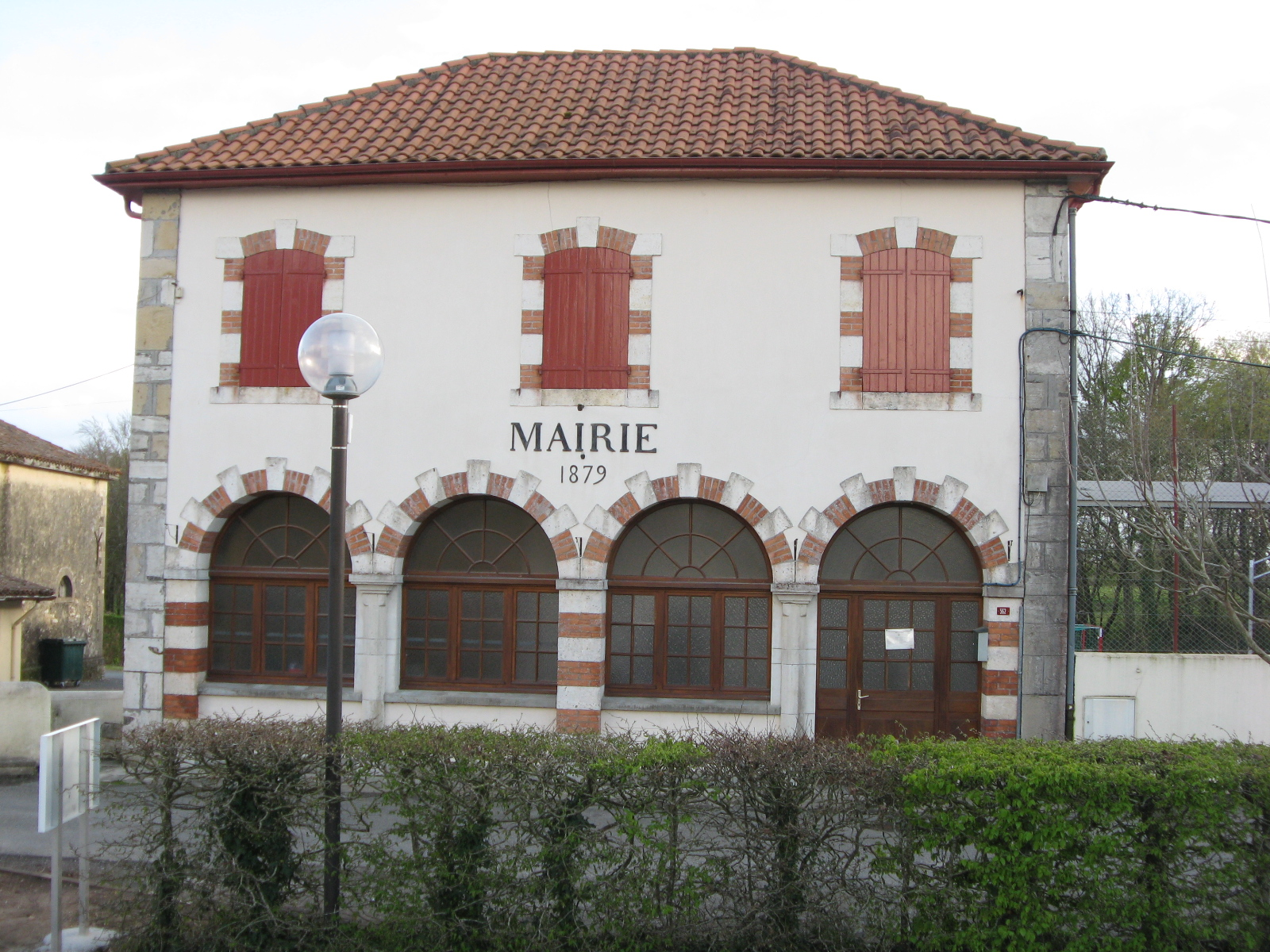
- Town hall

- Coat of arms
- Location of Biaudos
- Location within France Location within Nouvelle-Aquitaine
- Coordinates: 43°33′05″N 1°18′14″W
- Country: France
- Region: Nouvelle-Aquitaine
- Department: Landes
- Arrondissement: Dax
- Canton: Seignanx
- Intercommunality: Seignanx

Government
  - Mayor (2020–2026): Jean-Marc Larre
- Area^{1}: 15.59 km^{2} (6.02 sq mi)
- Elevation: 50 m (160 ft)
- Highest elevation: 66 m (217 ft)
- Lowest elevation: 0 m (0 ft)
- Population (2023): 1,041
  - Density: 66.77/km^{2} (172.9/sq mi)
- Time zone: UTC+01:00 (CET)
  - Summer (DST): UTC+02:00 (CEST)
- INSEE/Postal code: 40044 /40390
- ^{1} French Land Register data, which excludes lakes, ponds, glaciers > 1 km^{2} (0.386 sq mi or 247 acres) and river estuaries.

Biaudos is a commune in the Landes department in Nouvelle-Aquitaine in southwestern France.

== Population ==
Historical population
| Year | Pop. | ±% p.a. |
|---|---|---|
| 1968 | 457 | — |
| 1975 | 430 | −0.87% |
| 1982 | 474 | +1.40% |
| 1990 | 544 | +1.74% |
| 1999 | 636 | +1.75% |
| 2007 | 712 | +1.42% |
| 2012 | 874 | +4.19% |
| 2017 | 908 | +0.77% |
| 2023 | 1,041 | +2.30% |
Source: INSEE

== See also ==
- Communes of the Landes department
