= Florence Delaunay =

French politician

- Parliamentary group: Socialist

Deputy for Landes's 1st constituency in the National Assembly of France
- In office 17 June 2012 – 19 June 2012
- Preceded by: Alain Vidalies
- Succeeded by: Alain Vidalies
- In office 22 July 2012 – 30 April 2014
- Preceded by: Alain Vidalies
- Succeeded by: Alain Vidalies
- In office 27 September 2014 – 17 June 2017
- Preceded by: Alain Vidalies
- Succeeded by: Alain Vidalies, Geneviève Darrieussecq

Personal details
- Born: 12 June 1956 (age 69) Chinon (Indre-et-Loire),

Florence Delaunay, born 1956 in Chinon (Indre-et-Loire), is a French politician. She was the deputy for Landes's 1st constituency on three occasions, as the substitute candidate for Alain Vidalies, when he was Minister for relations with parliament, and later Transport Minister. She was the first woman to be a national assembly deputy from Landes.

== Biography ==
Originally from Touraine, she joined the local civil service in 1974 and moved to Aquitaine in 1998 when recruited as director general of services for the municipality of Saint-Sever. In 2002, she was director of services for the Côte Landes Nature community of municipalities, which was called the Community of municipalities of the Canton of Castets when it was created.

== Political career ==
Delaunay has been a municipal councillor in Léon and a Regional Councillor, in addition to her National Assembly service.
