= Landes's 1st constituency =

Constituency of the National Assembly of France

1st constituency of Landes
- inline Constituency of the National Assembly of France

- Constituency in Department

- Landes in France
- Deputy: Geneviève Darrieussecq; MoDem
- Department: Landes
- Cantons: (pre-2015) Castets, Gabarret, Labrit, Mimizan, Mont-de-Marsan-Nord, Mont-de-Marsan-Sud, Parentis-en-Born, Pissos, Roquefort, Sabres, Sore
- Registered voters: 136,984

The 1st constituency of the Landes (French: Première circonscription des Landes) is a French legislative constituency in Landes département. Like the other 576 French constituencies, it elects one MP using the two-round system, with a run-off if no candidate receives over 50% of the vote in the first round.

== Description ==
The constituency covers the north of the department.

== Deputies ==
Election	Member	Party	Notes
1988	Alain Vidalies	PS	
1993	Louis Lauga	RPR	
1997	Alain Vidalies	PS	
2002	Alain Vidalies	PS	
2007	Alain Vidalies	PS	
2012	Alain Vidalies	PS	Appointed Minister for Parliamentary Relations
2012	Florence Delaunay	PS	Substitute for Vidalies
2014	Alain Vidalies	PS	Appointed Secretary of State for Transport, the Sea and Fisheries
2014	Florence Delaunay	PS	Substitute for Vidalies
2017	Geneviève Darrieussecq	MoDem	Appointed Secretary of State to the Minister of the Armed Forces
2017	Fabien Lainé	MoDem	Substitute for Darrieussecq
2022	Geneviève Darrieussecq	MoDem	Appointed Minister for People with Disabilities
2022	Fabien Lainé	MoDem	Substitute for Darrieussecq
2024	Geneviève Darrieussecq	MoDem	

== Election results ==
=== 2024 ===
Candidate	Party	Alliance	First round			Second round		
Candidate	Party	Alliance	Votes	%	+/–	Votes	%	+/–
Veronique Fossey	RN		28,138	37.23	+17.08	31,768	43.22	new
Geneviève Darrieussecq	MoDEM	Ensemble	21,353	28.25	-5.14	41,736	56.78	+0.97
Marie-Laure Lafargue	PS	NFP	20,466	27.08	-4.13	withdrew		
Fabienne Chrit	LR	UDC	3,343	4.42	-1.88			
Jean Claude Bon	LO		852	1.13	+0.27			
Dominique Jarreau	LC		720	0.95	new			
Isabelle Henaff	REC		700	0.93	-2.01			
Degny Hermann Amessan	DVC		4	0.01	new			
Votes			75,576	100.00		73,504	100.00	
Valid votes			75,576	96.87	-0.16	73,504	93.84	+4.36
Blank votes			1,714	2.20	-0.06	3,589	4.58	-3.06
Null votes			725	0.93	+0.22	1,232	1.57	-1.31
Turnout			78,015	71.12	+18.13	78,325	71.41	+21.37
Abstentions			31,682	28.88	-18.13	31,355	28.59	-21.37
Registered voters			109,697			109,680		
Result			MoDEM HOLD					

=== 2022 ===
Legislative Election 2022: Landes's 1st constituency
Party	Candidate	Votes	%	±%
MoDem (Ensemble)	Geneviève Darrieussecq	18,633	33.39	-9.95
LFI (NUPÉS)	Guy De Barbeyrac	12,805	22.95	-7.16
RN	Michel Dufay	11,241	20.15	+8.67
LR (UDC)	Marie-Christine Harambat	3,516	6.30	−5.30
R!	Sébastien Cazaubon	3,062	5.49	N/A
FGR	Daniel Large	2,281	4.09	N/A
REC	Stéphane David	2,196	3.94	N/A
Others	N/A	2,062	3.70	
Turnout		55,796	52.99	−1.29
2nd round result
MoDem (Ensemble)	Geneviève Darrieussecq	27,123	55.81	-7.84
LFI (NUPÉS)	Guy De Barbeyrac	21,472	44.19	+7.84
Turnout		48,595	50.04	+3.76
MoDem hold				

=== 2017 ===
Candidate	Label	First round		Second round	
Candidate	Label	Votes	%	Votes	%
Geneviève Darrieussecq	MoDem	23,213	43.34	26,192	63.65
Renaud Lagrave	PS	7,208	13.46	14,961	36.35
Céline Piot	FI	6,448	12.04		
Marie-Françoise Nadau	LR	6,214	11.60		
Christophe Bardin	FN	6,150	11.48		
Fanette Billard	ECO	1,517	2.83		
Thierry Le Bris	PCF	953	1.78		
Claude Molle	DLF	873	1.63		
Antoine Da Costa	DIV	281	0.52		
Danièle Hubert	EXG	274	0.51		
Christian Sourbes	EXG	232	0.43		
Dominique Jarreau	DVD	191	0.36		
Marie-Françoise Paul	DVD	1	0.00		
Votes		53,555	100.00	41,153	100.00
Valid votes		53,555	97.30	41,153	87.71
Blank votes		1,080	1.96	4,064	8.66
Null votes		405	0.74	1,702	3.63
Turnout		55,040	54.28	46,919	46.28
Abstentions		46,364	45.72	54,469	53.72
Registered voters		101,404		101,388	
Source: Ministry of the Interior

=== 2012 ===
2012 legislative election in Landes's 1st constituency
Candidate	Party	First round		Second round	
Candidate	Party	Votes	%	Votes	%
Alain Vidalies	PS	26,434	45.57%	31,839	59.12%
Alain Dudon	UMP	15,986	27.56%	22,035	40.92%
Arnaud Lagrave	FN	5,727	9.87%		
Alain Baché	FG	3,462	5.97%		
Philippe Cazaubon	MoDem	3,438	5.93%		
Laurence Motoman	EELV	1,326	2.29%		
Laurent Pinsolle	DLR	494	0.85%		
Carole Carlier	AEI	404	0.70%		
Christian Sourbes	POI	320	0.55%		
Serge Avignon	PR	221	0.38%		
Emmanuelle Couturier	LO	201	0.35%		
Valid votes		58,013	98.16%	53,854	96.41%
Spoilt and null votes		1,088	1.84%	2,004	3.59%
Votes cast / turnout		59,101	60.50%	55,858	57.18%
Abstentions		38,592	39.50%	41,826	42.82%
Registered voters		97,693	100.00%	97,684	100.00%
