= Saint-André-de-Seignanx =

- Commune
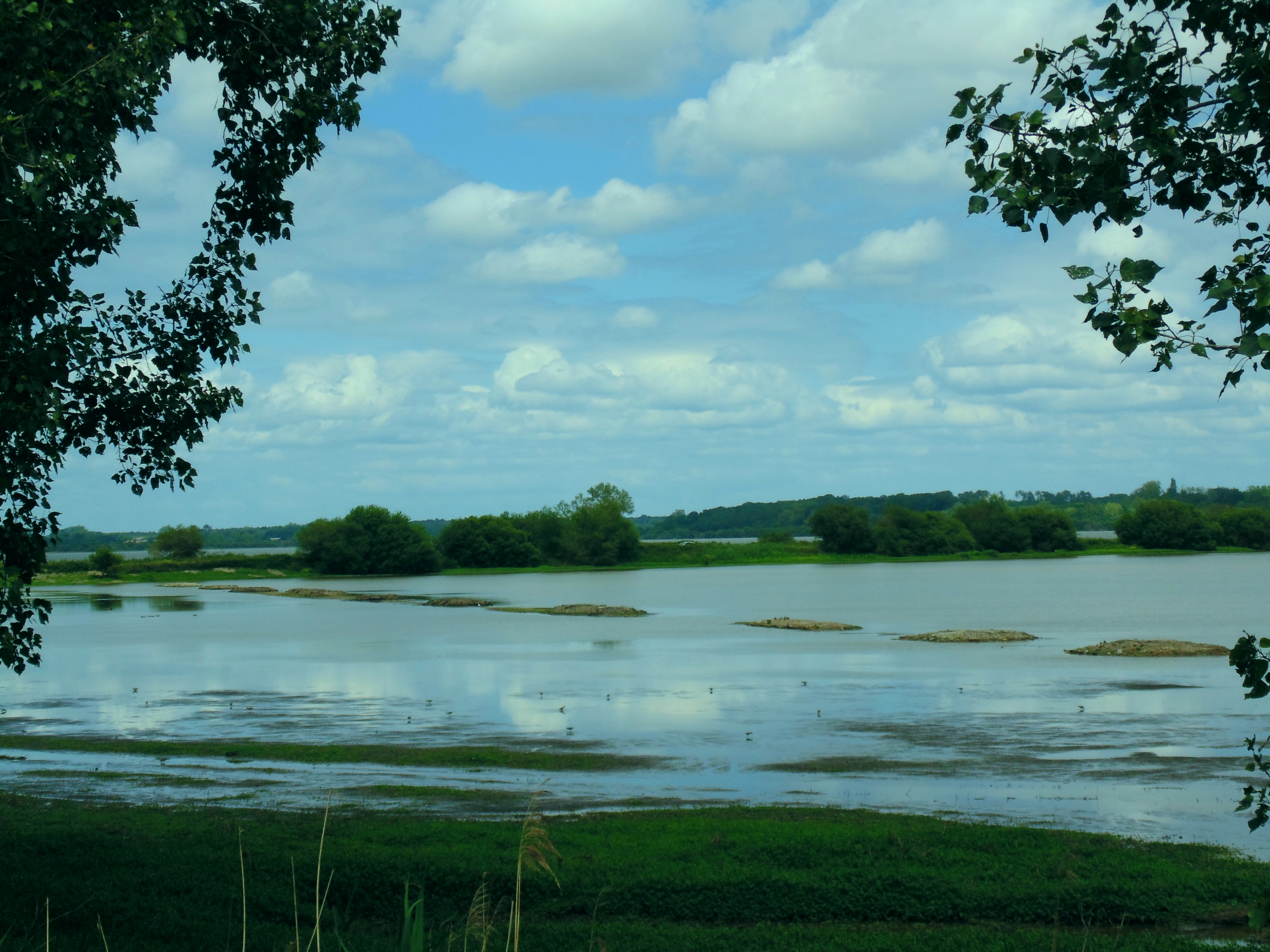
- Marais d'Orx
- Location of Saint-André-de-Seignanx
- Location within France Location within Nouvelle-Aquitaine
- Coordinates: 43°33′30″N 1°21′02″W
- Country: France
- Region: Nouvelle-Aquitaine
- Department: Landes
- Arrondissement: Dax
- Canton: Seignanx
- Intercommunality: Seignanx

Government
  - Mayor (2020–2026): Jean Baylet
- Area^{1}: 19.49 km^{2} (7.53 sq mi)
- Elevation: 70 m (230 ft)
- Highest elevation: 67 m (220 ft)
- Lowest elevation: 1 m (3.3 ft)
- Population (2023): 1,945
  - Density: 99.79/km^{2} (258.5/sq mi)
- Time zone: UTC+01:00 (CET)
  - Summer (DST): UTC+02:00 (CEST)
- INSEE/Postal code: 40248 /40390
- ^{1} French Land Register data, which excludes lakes, ponds, glaciers > 1 km^{2} (0.386 sq mi or 247 acres) and river estuaries.

Saint-André-de-Seignanx (French pronunciation: [sɛ̃.t‿ɑ̃dʁe də sɛɲɑ̃]; Occitan: Sent Andrèu de Senhans) is a commune in the Landes department in Nouvelle-Aquitaine in southwestern France.

== Population ==
Historical population
Year	Pop.	±% p.a.
1968	732	—
1975	720	−0.24%
1982	1,020	+5.10%
1990	1,271	+2.79%
1999	1,275	+0.03%
2007	1,489	+1.96%
2012	1,595	+1.38%
2017	1,766	+2.06%
2023	1,945	+1.62%
Source: INSEE

== See also ==
- Communes of the Landes department
