= List of senators of Landes =

Location of Landes in France

Following is a list of senators of Landes, people who have represented the department of Landes in the Senate of France.

== Third Republic ==
Senators for Landes under the French Third Republic were:

- Henri (Gavardie) (1876–1888)
- Marie-Raymond de Lacroix (Ravignan) (1876–1888)
- Louis de Cès-Caupenne (1887–1892)
- Louis Pazat (1888–1897)
- Victor Lourties (1888–1920)
- Jean Demoulins (Riols) (1892–1897)
- Arthur Latappy (1897–1919)
- Raphaël Milliès-Lacroix (1897–1933)
- Charles Cadilhon (1920–1933)
- Ernest Daraignez (1920–1940)
- Victor Lourties (1933–1940)
- Eugène Milliès-Lacroix (1933–1940)

== Fourth Republic ==
Senators for Landes under the French Fourth Republic were:

- Henri Monnet (1946–1948)
- Gérard Minvielle (1946–1959)
- André Darmanthé (1948–1955)
- Jean-Louis Fournier (1955–1959)

== Fifth Republic ==
Senators for Landes under the French Fifth Republic:

Period	Name	Group	Notes
1959–1965	Jean-Louis Fournier	Socialiste	
1959–1983	Gérard Minvielle	Socialiste	
1965–1983	Pierre Bouneau	none	
1983–1992	Yves Goussebaire-Dupin	Union des Républicains et des Indépendants	
1983–2011	Philippe Labeyrie	Socialiste	
1992–2017	Jean-Louis Carrère	Socialiste	
2011–2017	Danielle Michel	Socialiste	
from 2017	Monique Lubin	Socialiste	
from 2017	Éric Kerrouche	Socialiste	

== Sources ==
- Liste des anciens sénateurs de la IIIème République par circonscription (in French), Sénat de France
- Liste des anciens sénateurs de la IVème République par circonscription (in French), Sénat de France
- Liste des anciens sénateurs de la Vème République par circonscription (in French), Sénat de France
- Liste par département - Landes (in French), Sénat de France
