= Geneviève Darrieussecq =

French physician and politician

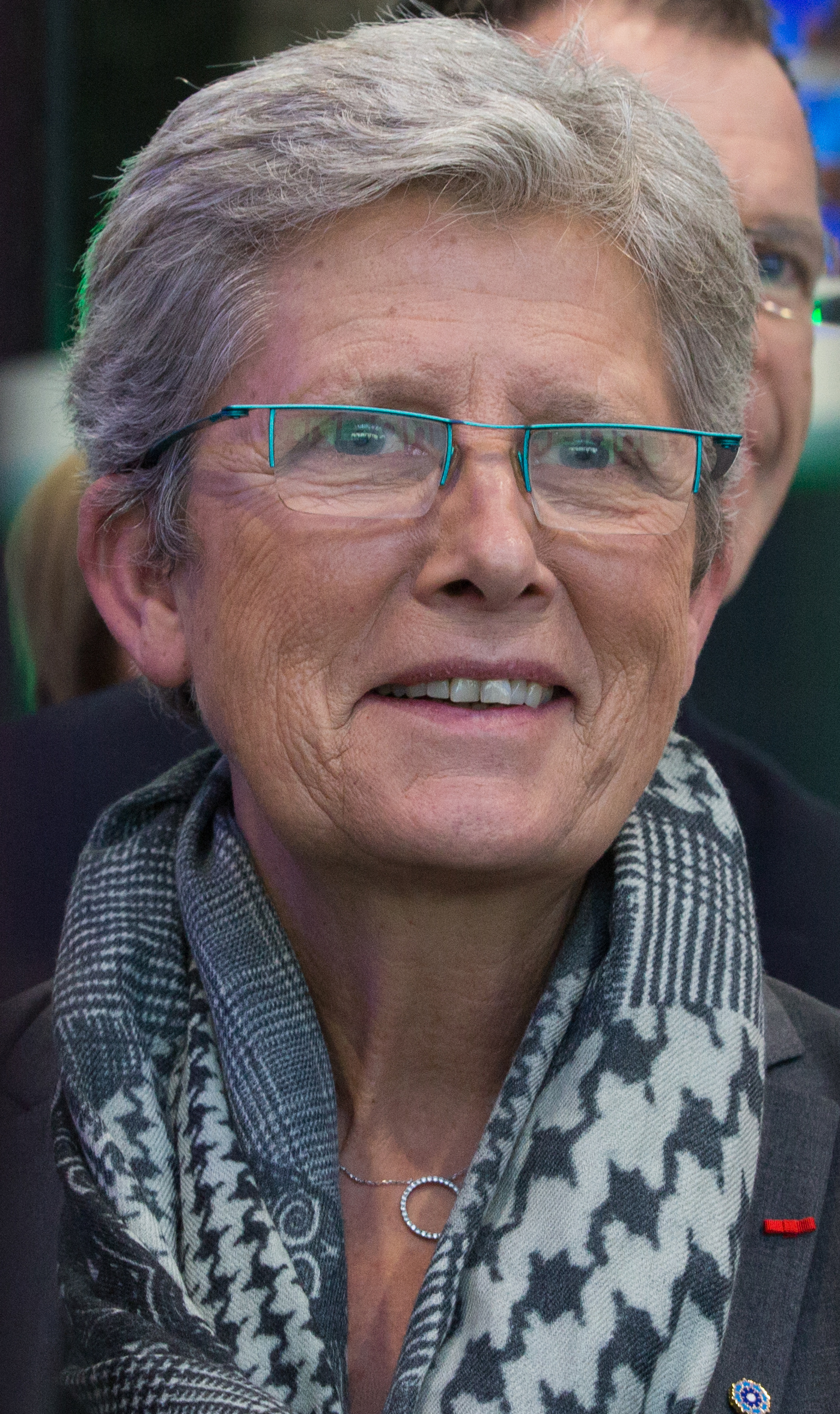
- Darrieussecq in 2017

Minister of Health and Access to Care
- In office 21 September 2024 – 23 December 2024
- Prime Minister: Michel Barnier
- Preceded by: Catherine Vautrin
- Succeeded by: Catherine Vautrin

Member of the National Assembly for Landes's 1st constituency
- In office 21 August 2023 – 21 October 2024
- Preceded by: Fabien Lainé
- Succeeded by: Fabien Lainé
- In office 21 June 2022 – 4 August 2022
- Preceded by: Fabien Lainé
- Succeeded by: Fabien Lainé
- In office 21 June 2017 – 21 July 2017
- Preceded by: Florence Delaunay
- Succeeded by: Fabien Lainé

Minister Delegate for People with Disabilities
- In office 4 July 2022 – 20 July 2023
- Prime Minister: Élisabeth Borne
- Preceded by: Damien Abad
- Succeeded by: Fadila Khattabi

Minister Delegate for Remembrance and Veterans
- In office 6 July 2020 – 20 May 2022
- Prime Minister: Jean Castex
- Preceded by: Herself (as Secretary of State)
- Succeeded by: Patricia Mirallès

Secretary of State to the Ministry of Armed Forces
- In office 21 June 2017 – 6 July 2020
- Prime Minister: Édouard Philippe
- Preceded by: Position established
- Succeeded by: Herself (as Minister Delegate)

Member of the regional council of Nouvelle-Aquitaine
- Incumbent
- Assumed office 2 July 2021

Member of the departmental council of Landes
- In office 29 March 2015 – 28 June 2017

Member of the regional council of Aquitaine
- In office 4 April 2004 – 6 December 2015

Mayor of Mont-de-Marsan
- In office 21 March 2008 – 7 July 2017
- Preceded by: Philippe Labeyrie
- Succeeded by: Charles Dayot

Member of the municipal council of Mont-de-Marsan
- Incumbent
- Assumed office 21 March 2008

Personal details
- Born: Geneviève Lafitte; 4 March 1956 (age 70) Peyrehorade, Landes, France
- Party: MoDem (2007–present)
- Other political affiliations: UDF (2004–2007)
- Spouse: Marcel Darrieussecq
- Children: 4
- Education: University of Bordeaux
- Occupation: Doctor • Politician

Geneviève Darrieussecq (French pronunciation: [ʒənvjɛv daʁjøsɛk]; born 4 March 1956) is a French physician and politician of Democratic Movement (MoDem) who served as Minister of Health in the government of Prime Minister Michel Barnier in 2024 and as Minister for People with Disabilities in the government of Prime Minister Élisabeth Borne from 2022 to 2023. From 2017 to 2022, she was the Secretary of State to the Minister of the Armed Forces in the governments of successive Prime Ministers Édouard Philippe and Jean Castex.

== Career ==
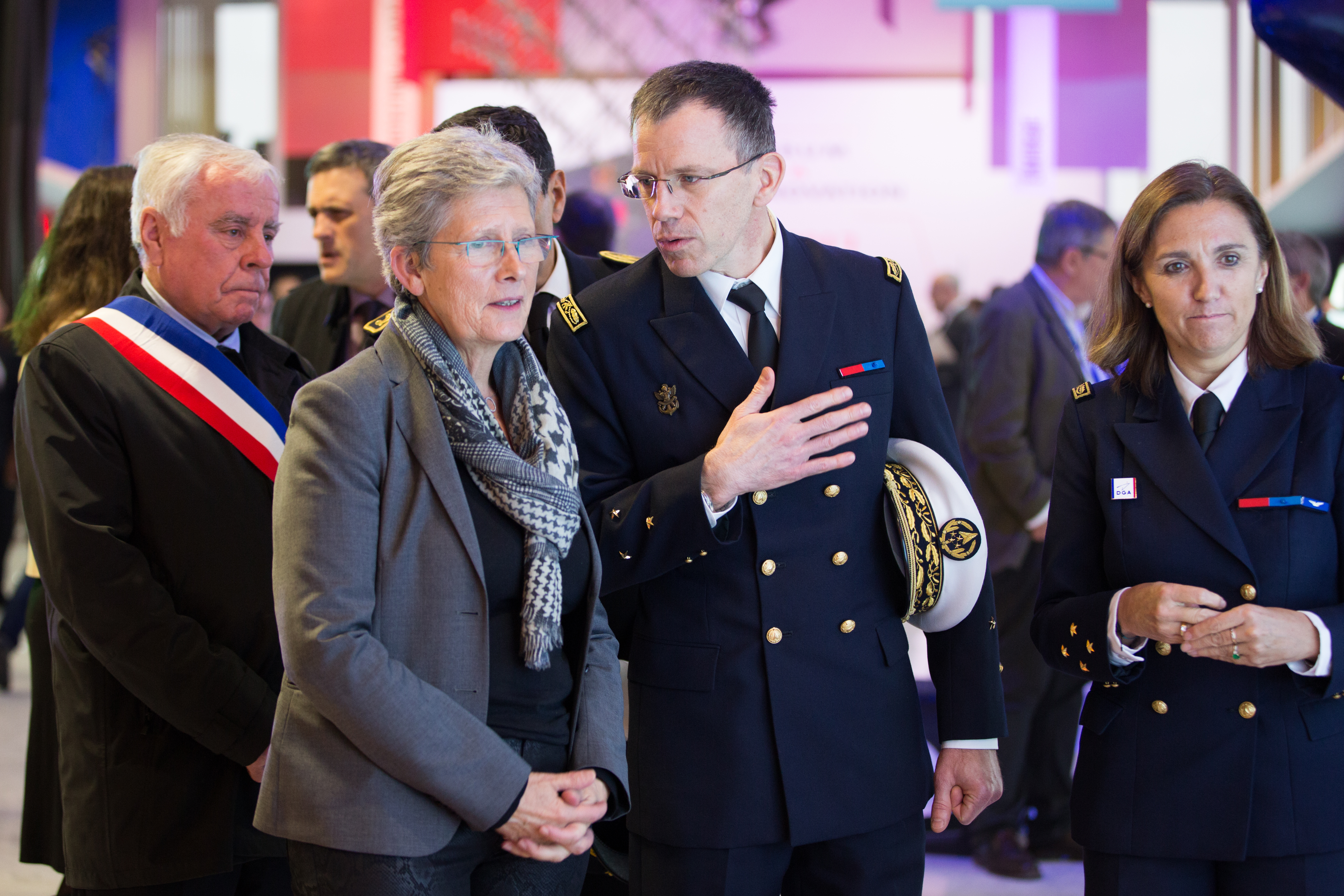
Visit of Geneviève Darrieussecq at the École polytechnique in 2017

=== Career in local politics ===
Darrieussecq was the mayor of Mont-de-Marsan (2008-2017).

=== Career in national politics ===
In 2010, François Bayrou included Darrieussecq in his shadow cabinet; in this capacity, Darrieussecq served as opposition counterpart to Minister of Health Roselyne Bachelot ahead of the 2012 French presidential election.

In the Republicans' 2016 presidential primary, Darrieussecq endorsed Alain Juppé as the party's candidate for the 2017 French presidential election.

In 2017 Darrieussecq was elected to the National Assembly from Landes's 1st constituency.

On 21 June 2017 Darrieussecq was appointed Secretary of State to the Minister of the Armed Forces Florence Parly in the Second Philippe government. Fabien Lainé succeeded her in the National Assembly and Charles Dayot succeeded her as mayor of Mont-de-Marsan (on 7 July 2017). Contexte's newspaper notes that "Geneviève Darrieussecq is discreet with Florence Parly at the Ministry of the Armed Forces. She had a specific mission letter: to her "the human", when the minister takes care of the material. The memory, the youth, the training, the service of health of the armies, the durable development in the armies, the family plan are her first subjects of concern. But she must keep abreast of the rest, to be able to answer in case of Parly's absence.

Since 2023, Darrieussecq has been part of the French delegation to the NATO Parliamentary Assembly, where she serves on the Science and Technology Committee and the Mediterranean and Middle East Special Group.
