= Saint-Martin-de-Seignanx =

- Commune
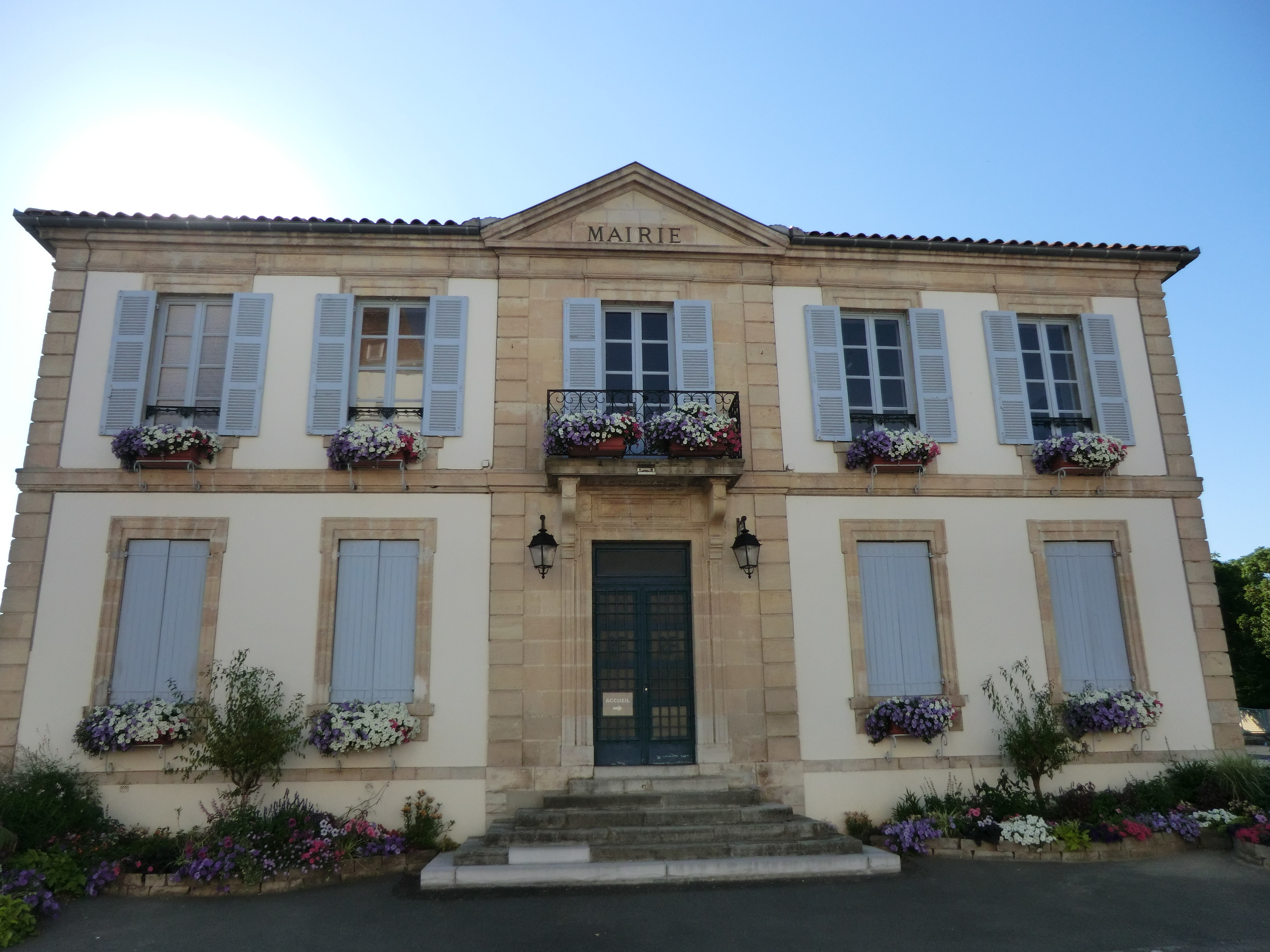
- Town hall
- Location of Saint-Martin-de-Seignanx
- Location within France Location within Nouvelle-Aquitaine
- Coordinates: 43°32′38″N 1°23′09″W
- Country: France
- Region: Nouvelle-Aquitaine
- Department: Landes
- Arrondissement: Dax
- Canton: Seignanx
- Intercommunality: Seignanx

Government
  - Mayor (2020–2026): Julien Fichot
- Area^{1}: 45.35 km^{2} (17.51 sq mi)
- Elevation: 56 m (184 ft)
- Highest elevation: 72 m (236 ft)
- Lowest elevation: 0 m (0 ft)
- Population (2023): 6,238
  - Density: 137.6/km^{2} (356.3/sq mi)
- Time zone: UTC+01:00 (CET)
  - Summer (DST): UTC+02:00 (CEST)
- INSEE/Postal code: 40273 /40390
- ^{1} French Land Register data, which excludes lakes, ponds, glaciers > 1 km^{2} (0.386 sq mi or 247 acres) and river estuaries.

Saint-Martin-de-Seignanx (French pronunciation: [sɛ̃ maʁtɛ̃ də sɛɲɑ̃]; Gascon: Sent Martin de Senhans) is a commune in the Landes department in Nouvelle-Aquitaine in southwestern France.

== Population ==
Historical population

Year	Pop.	±% p.a.
1793	2,151	—
1800	1,838	−2.22%
1806	1,976	+1.21%
1821	2,092	+0.38%
1831	2,280	+0.86%
1836	2,411	+1.12%
1841	2,515	+0.85%
1846	2,489	−0.21%
1851	2,592	+0.81%
1856	2,497	−0.74%
1861	2,627	+1.02%
1866	2,697	+0.53%
1872	2,703	+0.04%
1876	2,740	+0.34%
1881	2,713	−0.20%
1886	2,605	−0.81%
1891	2,524	−0.63%
1896	2,548	+0.19%
1901	2,614	+0.51%

Year	Pop.	±% p.a.
1906	2,634	+0.15%
1911	2,509	−0.97%
1921	2,275	−0.97%
1926	2,272	−0.03%
1931	2,281	+0.08%
1936	2,109	−1.56%
1946	2,019	−0.44%
1954	2,044	+0.15%
1962	2,003	−0.25%
1968	2,053	+0.41%
1975	2,318	+1.75%
1982	2,903	+3.27%
1990	3,047	+0.61%
1999	3,903	+2.79%
2007	4,715	+2.39%
2012	4,929	+0.89%
2017	5,488	+2.17%
2023	6,238	+2.16%

Source: EHESS and INSEE (1968-2023)

== International relations ==
Saint-Martin-de-Seignanx is a sister city of the Spanish town Oyón-Oion.

== See also ==
- Communes of the Landes department
