= Michel Crauste =

French rugby union player (1934–2019)

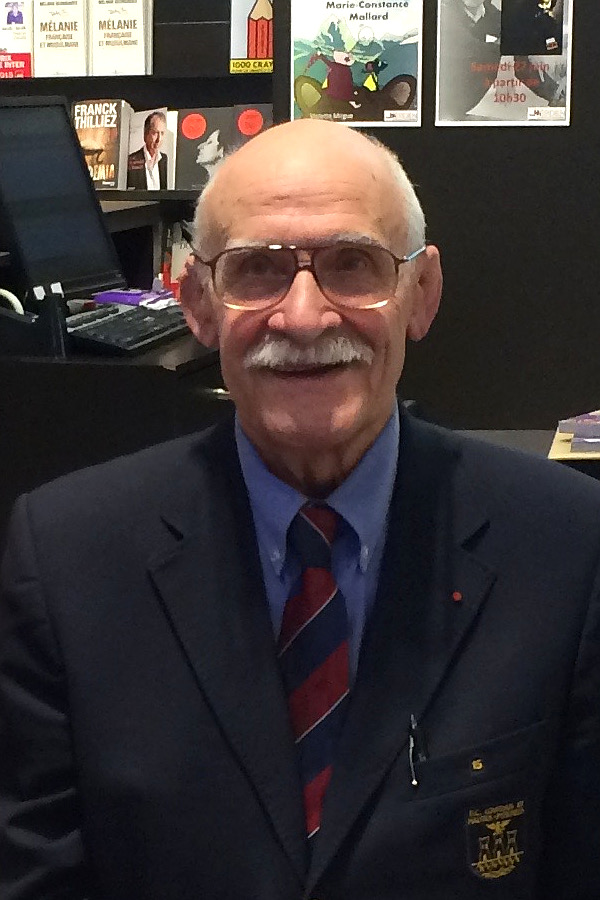
- Crauste in 2015
- Born: 6 July 1934 Saint-Laurent-de-Gosse, France
- Died: 2 May 2019 (aged 84) Pau, France
- Height: 1.81 m (5 ft 11 1/2 in)
- Weight: 85 kg (187 lb)

Rugby union career
- Position(s): Flanker, Number eight
Senior career
Years	Team	Apps	(Points)
1954–1959	Racing		
1959–1968	FC Lourdes		
International career
Years	Team	Apps	(Points)
1957–1966	France	63	(30)

Michel Crauste (6 July 1934 – 2 May 2019) was a French international rugby union player. He played as a flanker and number eight for Racing Club de France and FC Lourdes.

Crauste was born in Saint-Laurent-de-Gosse, France. He earned his first cap with the French national team on 19 May 1957 against Romania at Bucharest. He also captained the second French side to beat the Springboks in South Africa and was elected France's Player of the Year in 1961. He was also the first French international player to score three tries in one test match.

Crauste died, aged 84, in Pau, France.

== Honours ==
- Selected to represent France, 1957–1966
- French rugby champion 1959 with Racing Club de France, 1960 and 1968 with FC Lourdes
- Five Nations Championship 1959 to 1963
- Challenge Yves du Manoir 1966 and 1967
