= Tarnos =

- Commune
- Location of Tarnos
- Location within France Location within Nouvelle-Aquitaine
- Coordinates: 43°32′28″N 1°27′36″W
- Country: France
- Region: Nouvelle-Aquitaine
- Department: Landes
- Arrondissement: Dax
- Canton: Seignanx
- Intercommunality: Seignanx

Government
  - Mayor (2024–2026): Marc Mabillet
- Area^{1}: 26.26 km^{2} (10.14 sq mi)
- Elevation: 44 m (144 ft)
- Highest elevation: 53 m (174 ft)
- Lowest elevation: 0 m (0 ft)
- Population (2023): 12,957
  - Density: 493.4/km^{2} (1,278/sq mi)
- Time zone: UTC+01:00 (CET)
  - Summer (DST): UTC+02:00 (CEST)
- INSEE/Postal code: 40312 /40220
- ^{1} French Land Register data, which excludes lakes, ponds, glaciers > 1 km^{2} (0.386 sq mi or 247 acres) and river estuaries.

Tarnos (French pronunciation: [taʁnɔs]; Basque: Tarnose; Occitan: Tarnòs) is a commune in the Landes department in Nouvelle-Aquitaine in southwestern France.

== Geography ==
Tarnos is in the far southwest corner of the department, 5 km north of Bayonne.

== Population ==
Historical population

Year	Pop.	±% p.a.
1793	1,315	—
1800	1,327	+0.13%
1806	1,555	+2.68%
1821	2,002	+1.70%
1831	2,324	+1.50%
1836	2,514	+1.58%
1841	2,651	+1.07%
1846	2,760	+0.81%
1851	2,937	+1.25%
1856	3,112	+1.16%
1861	1,657	−11.84%
1866	1,738	+0.96%
1872	1,788	+0.47%
1876	1,739	−0.69%
1881	1,796	+0.65%
1886	2,530	+7.09%
1891	2,645	+0.89%
1896	3,071	+3.03%
1901	3,617	+3.33%

Year	Pop.	±% p.a.
1906	3,630	+0.07%
1911	3,774	+0.78%
1921	3,902	+0.33%
1926	4,087	+0.93%
1931	4,250	+0.79%
1936	4,012	−1.15%
1946	3,911	−0.25%
1954	4,255	+1.06%
1962	4,813	+1.55%
1968	5,054	+0.82%
1975	6,959	+4.68%
1982	8,219	+2.41%
1990	9,099	+1.28%
1999	10,076	+1.14%
2007	11,154	+1.28%
2012	12,423	+2.18%
2017	12,264	−0.26%
2023	12,957	+0.92%

Source: EHESS and INSEE (1968–2023)

== See also ==
- Communes of the Landes department
