= Château de Gaujacq =

Manor house in Landes, France

Coordinates: 43°37′58″N 0°45′35″W

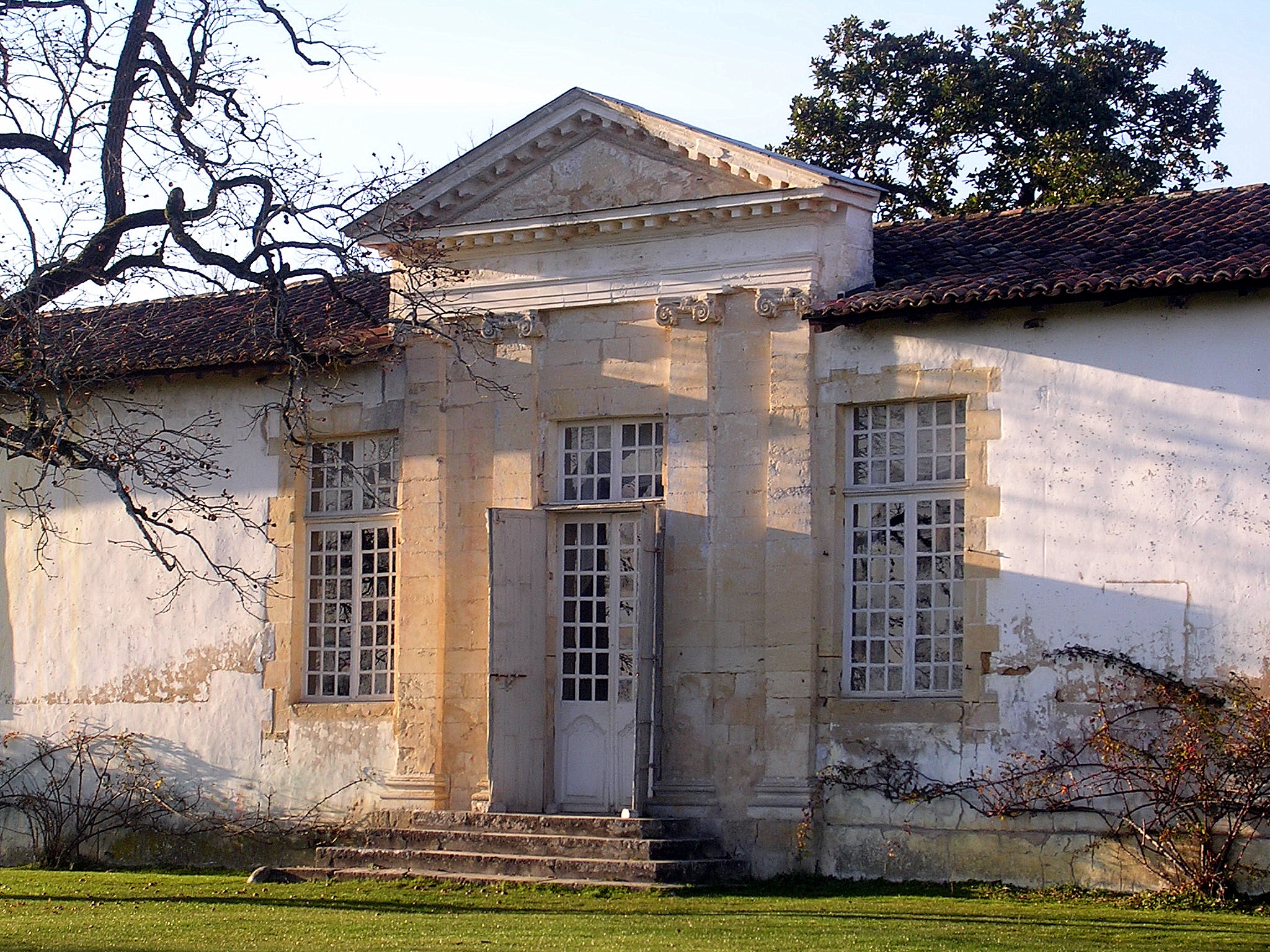
Château de Gaujacq

Château de Gaujacq is a château in Landes, Nouvelle-Aquitaine, France. It dates to 1686 and was built in the Italian renaissance style. The château has been owned by the Casedevant family since 1960.
