= Saint-Laurent-de-Gosse =

- Commune
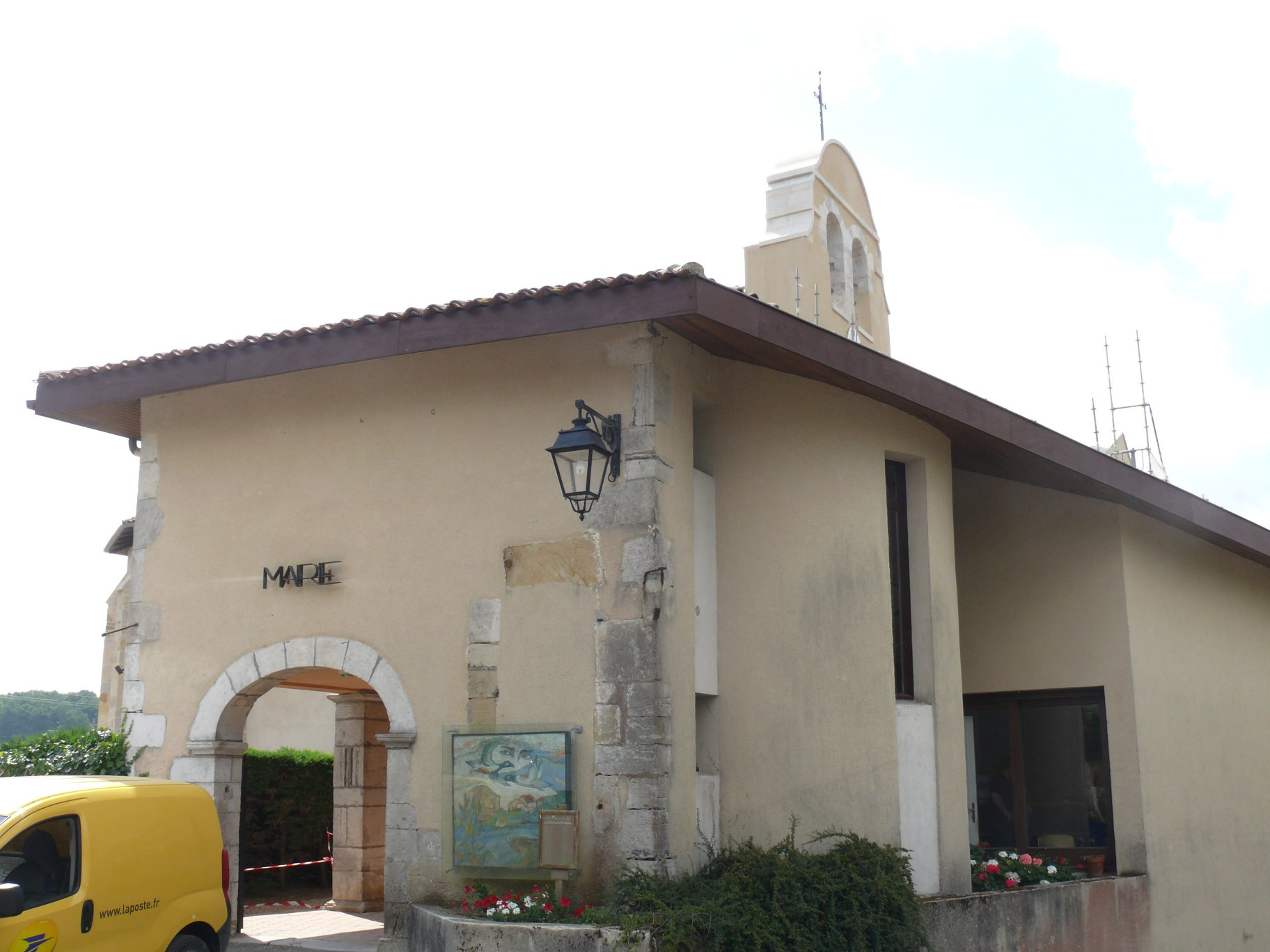
- Town hall

- Coat of arms
- Location of Saint-Laurent-de-Gosse
- Location within France Location within Nouvelle-Aquitaine
- Coordinates: 43°32′02″N 1°16′01″W
- Country: France
- Region: Nouvelle-Aquitaine
- Department: Landes
- Arrondissement: Dax
- Canton: Seignanx
- Intercommunality: Seignanx

Government
  - Mayor (2020–2026): Isabelle Cazalis
- Area^{1}: 17.39 km^{2} (6.71 sq mi)
- Elevation: 50 m (160 ft)
- Highest elevation: 76 m (249 ft)
- Lowest elevation: 0 m (0 ft)
- Population (2023): 745
  - Density: 42.8/km^{2} (111/sq mi)
- Time zone: UTC+01:00 (CET)
  - Summer (DST): UTC+02:00 (CEST)
- INSEE/Postal code: 40268 /40390
- ^{1} French Land Register data, which excludes lakes, ponds, glaciers > 1 km^{2} (0.386 sq mi or 247 acres) and river estuaries.

Saint-Laurent-de-Gosse (French pronunciation: [sɛ̃ loʁɑ̃ də ɡɔs]; Occitan: Sent Laurenç de Gòssa, before 1962: Saint-Laurent) is a commune in the Landes department in Nouvelle-Aquitaine in southwestern France.

== Population ==
Historical population
Year	Pop.	±% p.a.
1968	414	—
1975	384	−1.07%
1982	385	+0.04%
1990	420	+1.09%
1999	481	+1.52%
2007	504	+0.59%
2012	585	+3.03%
2017	657	+2.35%
2023	745	+2.12%
Source: INSEE

== See also ==
- Communes of the Landes department
