= Château de Belhade =

Château in Nouvelle-Aquitaine, France

Coordinates: 44°22′38″N 0°42′02″W

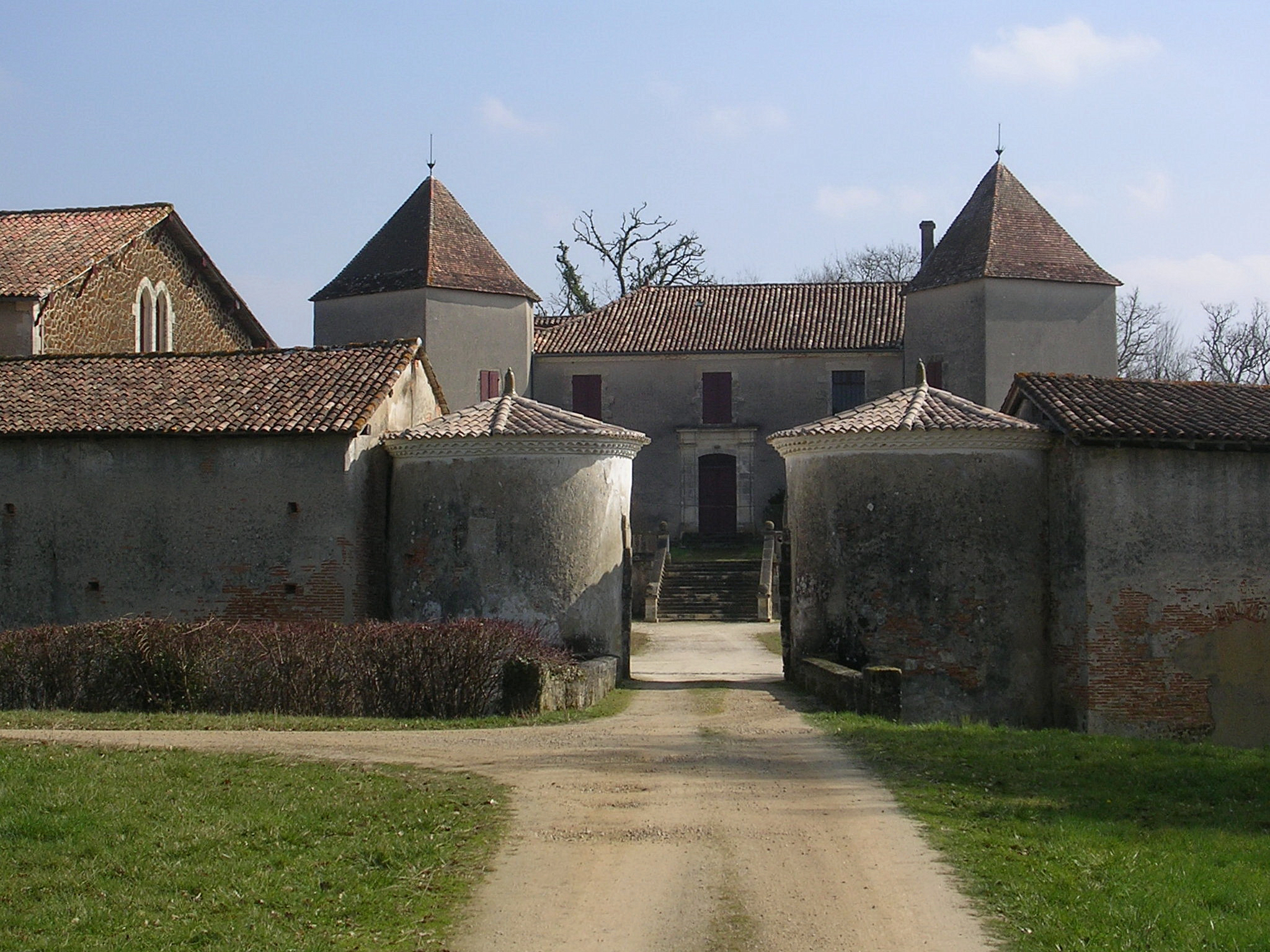

Château de Belhade is a château in Landes, Nouvelle-Aquitaine, France. It dates to the 14th century and is built in a 13th-century style.
