= Canton of Seignanx =

Coordinates: 43.54°N 1.39°W

The canton of Seignanx is an administrative division of the Landes department, southwestern France. It was created at the French canton reorganisation which came into effect in March 2015. Its seat is in Saint-Martin-de-Seignanx.

It consists of the following communes:

1. Biarrotte
2. Biaudos
3. Ondres
4. Saint-André-de-Seignanx
5. Saint-Barthélemy
6. Saint-Laurent-de-Gosse
7. Saint-Martin-de-Seignanx
8. Tarnos
