= Château de Lacaze =

Château in Nouvelle-Aquitaine, France

Coordinates: 43°56′35″N 0°02′03″E

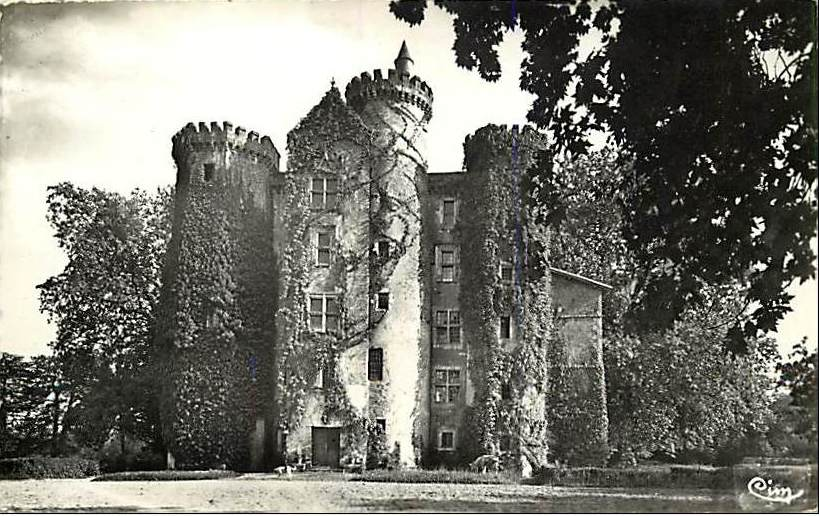

Château de Lacaze is a château in Landes, Nouvelle-Aquitaine, France. It dates from the 14th century.
