= Château de Castillon =

Château in Nouvelle-Aquitaine, France

Coordinates: 44°00′21″N 0°47′47″W

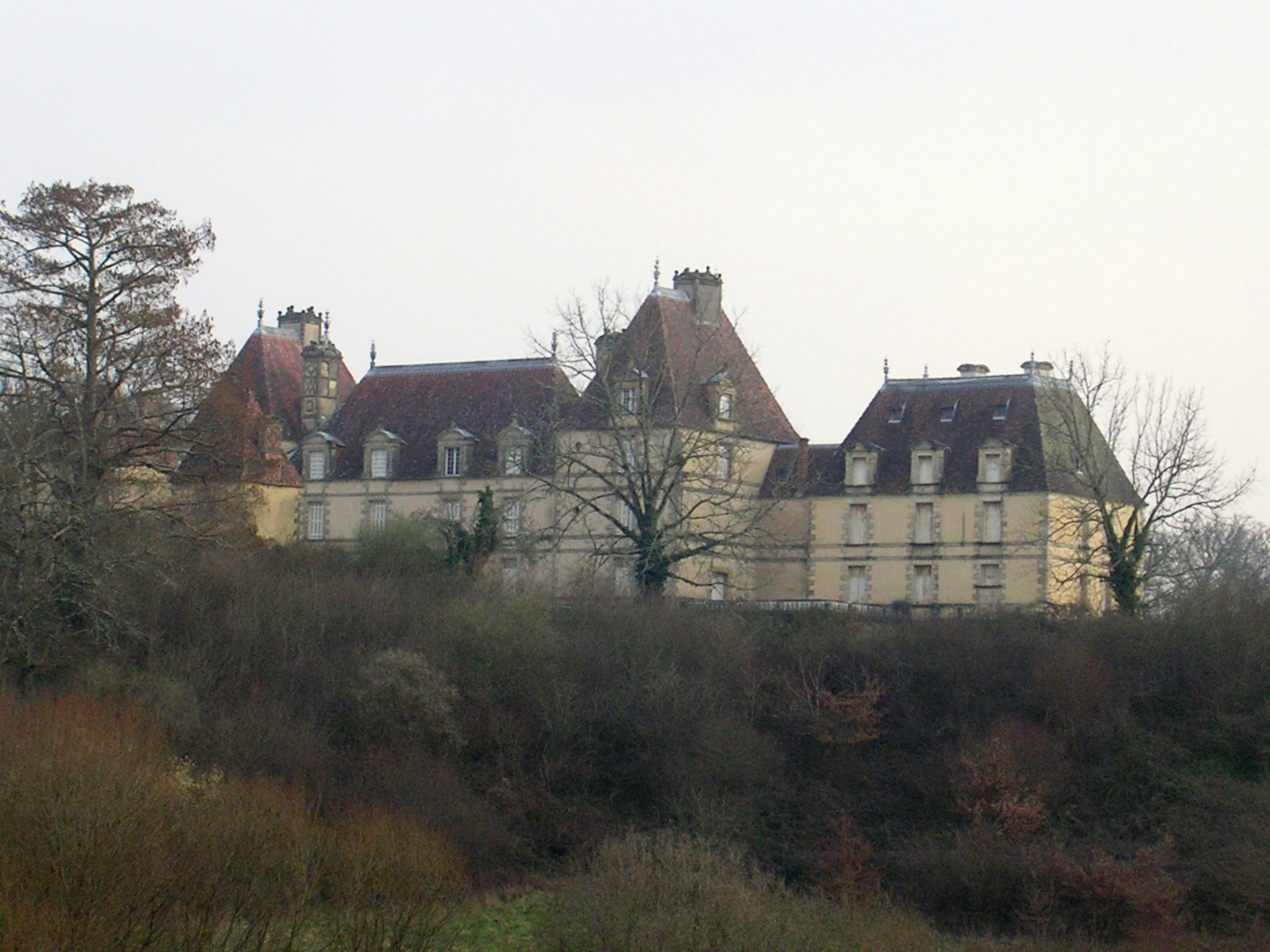

Château de Castillon is a château in Landes, Nouvelle-Aquitaine, France. It is built in the Louis XIII 18th century style.
