= Arrondissements of the Landes department =

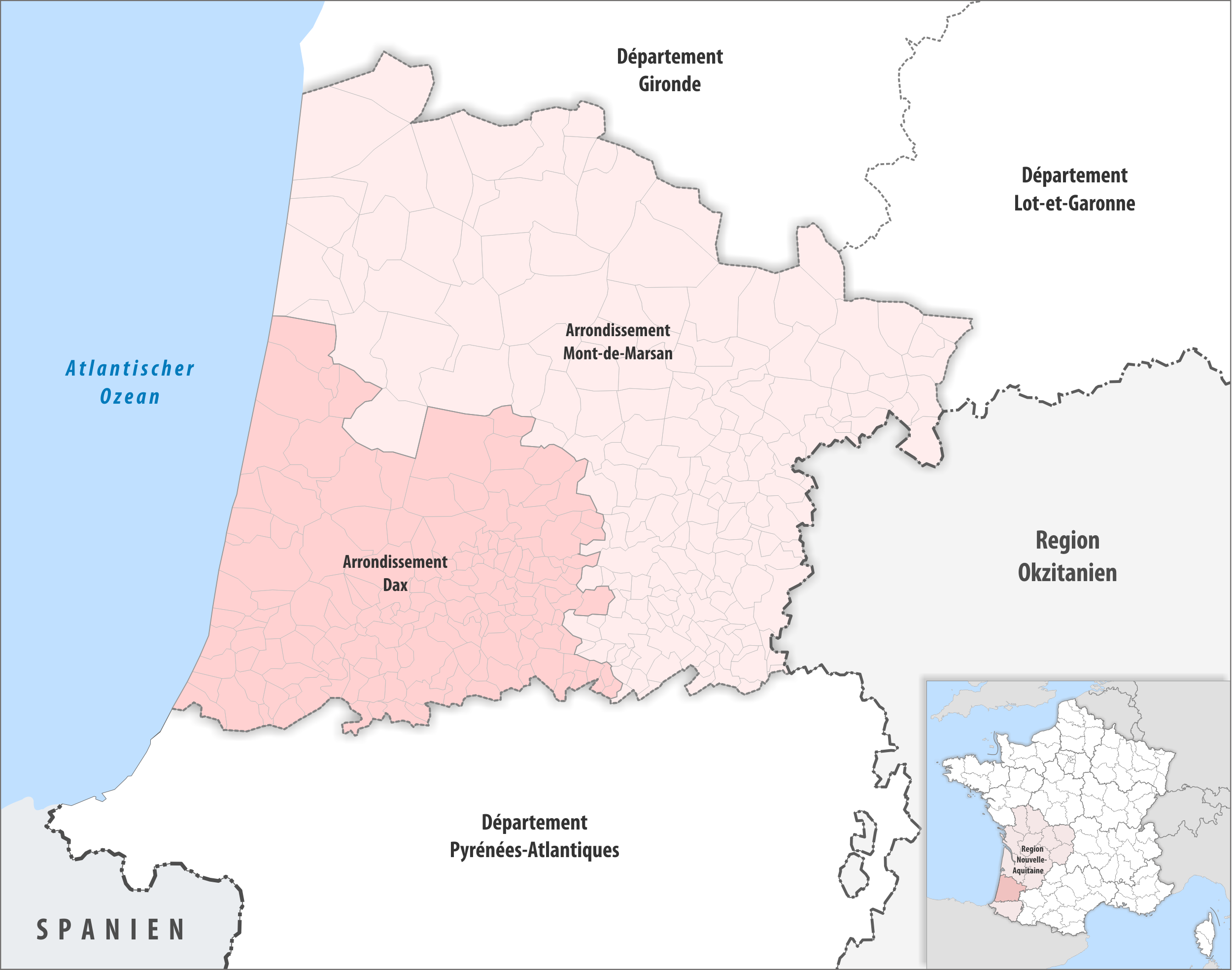
Map of arrondissements of the Landes department.

The 2 arrondissements of the Landes department are:

1. Arrondissement of Dax, (subprefecture: Dax) with 152 communes. The population of the arrondissement was 237,445 in 2021.
2. Arrondissement of Mont-de-Marsan, (prefecture of the Landes department: Mont-de-Marsan) with 175 communes. The population of the arrondissement was 185,531 in 2021.

== History ==
In 1800 the arrondissements of Mont-de-Marsan, Dax and Saint-Sever were established. The arrondissement of Saint-Sever was disbanded in 1926.
