= Fabien Lainé =

French politician (born 1976)

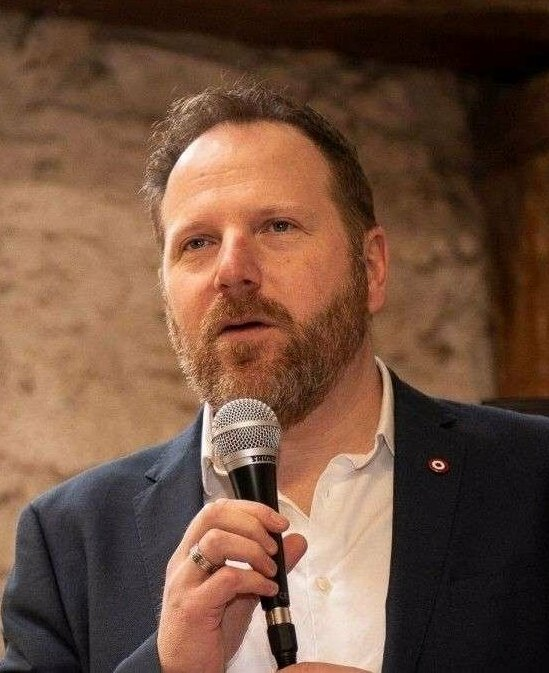
- Fabien Lainé

Member of the National Assembly for Landes's 1st constituency
- Incumbent
- Assumed office 22 October 2024
- Preceded by: Geneviève Darrieussecq
- In office 5 August 2022 – 20 August 2023
- Preceded by: Geneviève Darrieussecq
- Succeeded by: Geneviève Darrieussecq
- In office 22 July 2017 – 20 June 2022
- Preceded by: Geneviève Darrieussecq
- Succeeded by: Geneviève Darrieussecq

Member of the municipal council of Sanguinet
- Incumbent
- Assumed office 22 July 2017

Mayor of Sanguinet
- In office September 2023 – 30 November 2024
- Preceded by: Christophe Labruyère
- Succeeded by: Nathalie Soulage
- In office 30 March 2014 – 22 July 2017
- Preceded by: Bernard Laine
- Succeeded by: Raphaëlle Miremont

Personal details
- Born: 15 April 1976 (age 49) Arcachon, France
- Party: Democratic Movement

Fabien Lainé (born 15 April 1976) is a French politician of the Democratic Movement (MoDem). He has represented Landes's 1st constituency in the National Assembly since October 2024, having previously held the seat from July 2017 to June 2022 and August 2022 to August 2023.

== Early life and education ==
Fabien Lainé is Construction's Salesman.

== Political career ==
=== Mayor of Sanguinet ===
After the municipal elections of 2014, Fabien Lainé was elected Mayor of Sanguinet. He resigned to comply with the law on the Cumulation of mandates and left his place to Raphaëlle Miremon. He remained a member of the municipal council.

=== Member of the National Assembly ===
He was the substitute candidate for Geneviève Darrieussecq for Landes's 1st constituency at the 2017 National Assembly election. Following Darrieussecq's appointment to the government on June 21, 2017 he became a member of the National Assembly.

In the National Assembly, Fabien Lainé sits on the National Defence and Armed Forces Committee. He is also a President of the Hunting and territories's Working Group; and France-Singapore Friendship Group.

== See also ==
- 2017 French legislative election
