= Philippe Labeyrie =

French politician

Philippe Labeyrie (29 April 1938 – 13 October 2012) was a French politician.

Labeyrie succeeded Charles Lamarque-Cando as mayor of Mont-de-Marsan in 1983, and served until 2008, when Geneviève Darrieussecq replaced him. He was elected to the Senate in 1983, and remained in office until 2011, when he chose not to run for health reasons. He was a member of the Socialist Party.

Labeyrie died on 13 October 2012, aged 74. He had been hospitalized in Mont-de-Marsan since May 2012 due to cardiac and respiratory problems.
