= Monique Lubin =

French politician

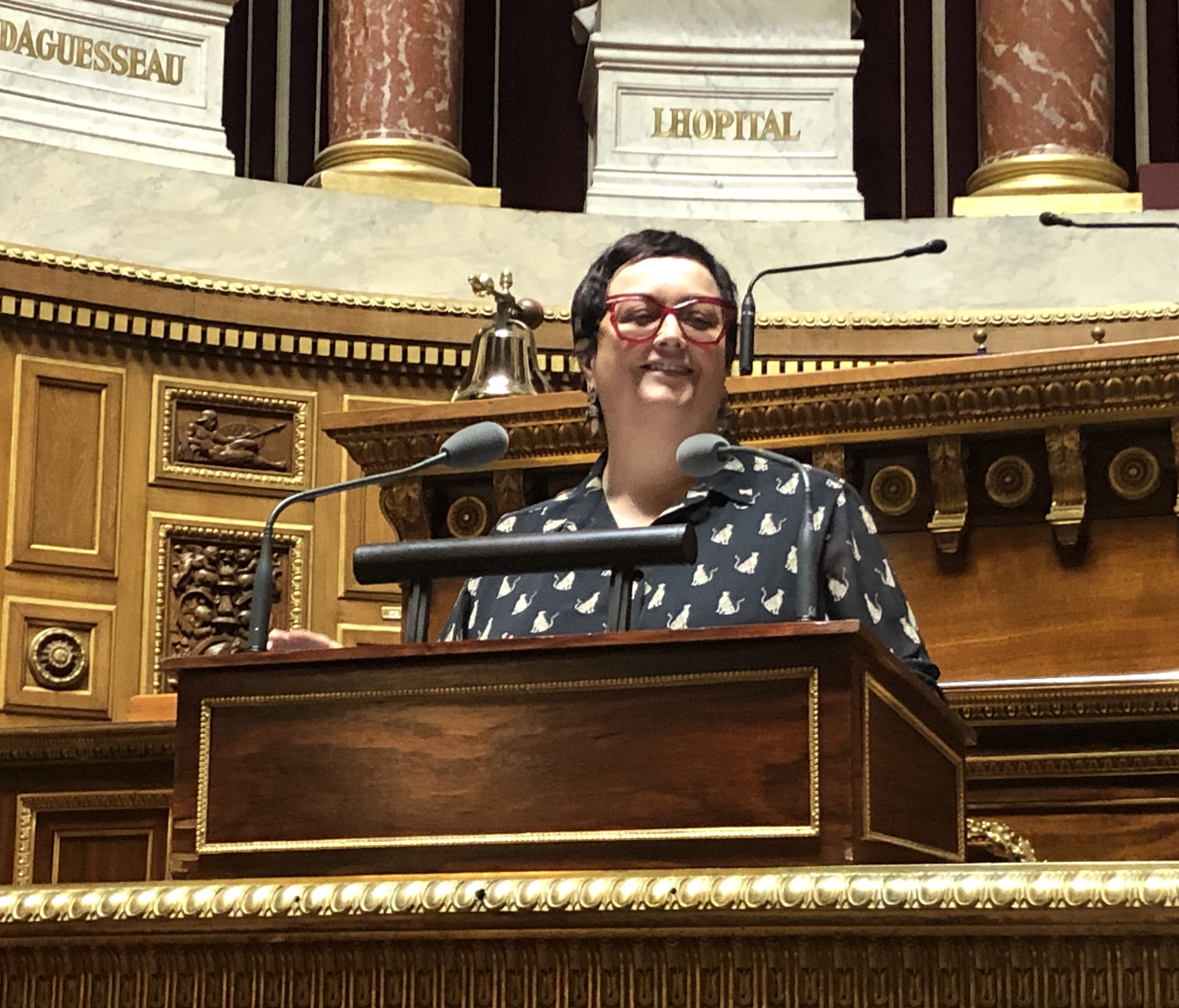

French Senator
- Incumbent
- Assumed office 2 October 2017

Personal details
- Born: 16 July 1963 (age 62)
- Party: PS

Monique Lubin (born 16 July 1963) is a French politician. She became senator of Landes on 2 October 2017.

== Political career ==
Monique Lubin was elected mayor of Aubagnan in 1999, succeeding Jean-Pierre Saint-Genez, and was re-elected in 2001.

From 1992 to 2004, she was President of the Centre national d'information des droits des femmes et des families (CIDFF) des Landes.

She was elected general councillor for the canton of Hagetmau in the 2004 cantonal elections and re-elected in 2011.

In 2004, she was appointed Deputy Chairman of the Mission Locale Landaise, succeeding Jean-Claude Sescousse. She stepped down from this position when she was elected to the French Senate in October 2017.

In March 2015, she was elected departmental councillor for the Chalosse Tursan canton in tandem with Olivier Martinez. She was vice-president of the departmental council from 2015 to 2017, in charge of the social affairs and housing commission.

On 21 March 2017 Monique Lubin became deputy for the 3rd Landes constituency following the death of Henri Emmanuelli. She resigned on 29 March.

She is a candidate in the 2017 senatorial elections in Landes. She was elected senator, in tandem with Socialist Éric Kerrouche.

=== Parliamentary work ===
On her arrival in the Senate, she joined the Social Affairs Committee, becoming its vice-president in 2019.

Appointed member of the Conseil d'orientation des retraites (COR) and the mission d'évaluation et de contrôle de la sécurité sociale, she and Senator René-Paul Savary authored two reports on pensions, one on "Pension reform: the end-of-career challenge" (2019) and the other on "Special scheme reserves" (2021).

Committed to youth issues, in January 2021 she was rapporteur for the Social Affairs Commission on Senator Rémi Cardon's bill on new rights from the age of eighteen. She also authored the report "L'égalité des chances, jalon des politiques de jeunesse" (Equal opportunity, a milestone in youth policies) (2021) or the Mission d'information sur la politique en faveur de l'égalité des chances et de l'émancipation de la jeunesse.

=== Elected representative of Landes ===
In defense of "traditional hunting", in the summer of 2021 she denounced a Conseil d'Etat decision to ban the hunting of larks with pantières or matoles, a practice deemed cruel by animal protectionists. She is also concerned about the future of net hunting for wood pigeon, bullfighting and the practice of force-feeding geese and ducks.

In November 2021, she took a stand in favor of the Grand projet ferroviaire du Sud-Ouest (GPSO) with Landes departmental council president Xavier Fortinon, along with Landes socialist elected representatives and parliamentarians, deputy Boris Vallaud and senator Éric Kerrouche.

== See also ==
- List of senators of Landes
