= Alain Vidalies =

French politician

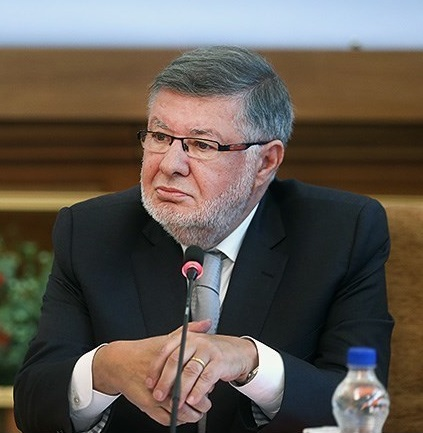

French Minister of Transport
- In office 26 August 2014 – 10 May 2017
- President: François Hollande
- Prime Minister: Manuel Valls; Bernard Cazeneuve
- Preceded by: Frédéric Cuvillier
- Succeeded by: Élisabeth Borne

Personal details
- Born: 17 March 1951 (age 75) Grenade-sur-l'Adour, France
- Party: Socialist Party
- Education: University of Bordeaux

Alain Vidalies (French pronunciation: [alɛ̃ vidali]; born 17 March 1951) was the French Secretary of State for Transport, the Sea and Fisheries from 26 August 2014 to 10 May 2017. He represents the Landes department in the National Assembly of France, and is a member of the Socialist Party and of the Socialiste, radical, citoyen et divers gauche parliamentary group.

== Early life and education ==
Vidalies studied law at the University of Pau before being called to the bar in 1979. He specialised in employment law whilst pursuing an interest in politics.

== Political career ==
Vidalies' political career began in 1976 as an assistant to Landes MP Roger Duroure before becoming a councillor for Mont-de-Marsan South in 1979, a post he would hold until 2007. He made his way in local politics until he was elected to the National Assembly on behalf of Landes' 1st constituency in 1988, and spent his time campaigning for better employment conditions. He lost his seat in 1993 and went back to the law, being appointed a deputy judge in 1997. He was also re-elected in 1997, and helped to reform family law, particularly in relation to alimony, and the 35-hour working week. He headed the parliamentary commission on modern slavery and was a member of the National Commission on Informatics and Liberties (CNIL) between 2000 and 2002. Vidalies was re-elected in 2002 and in 2007.

From 16 May 2012 to 31 March 2014, Vidalies served as Minister for Relations with Parliament (Ministre délégué aux Relations avec le Parlement) in the Ayrault Government under President François Hollande.

Ahead of the Socialist Party's 2012 convention in Toulouse, Vidalies publicly endorsed Jean-Christophe Cambadélis as candidate to succeed Martine Aubry at the party's leadership.

On 26 August 2014 Vidalies was appointed Secretary of State for Transport, the Sea and Fisheries (Secrétaire d’État chargé des Transports, de la Mer et de la Pêche), a junior minister of cabinet rank within the Ministry of Ecology, Sustainable Development and Energy, in the Second Valls Government. Incidents during this time have included the 2015 Thalys train attack and the 2016 strikes in protest against his government's changes to employment law and the 35-hour week.
