= Landes (department) =

Department of France

Landes Lanas (Occitan) Landak (Basque)
- Department of France
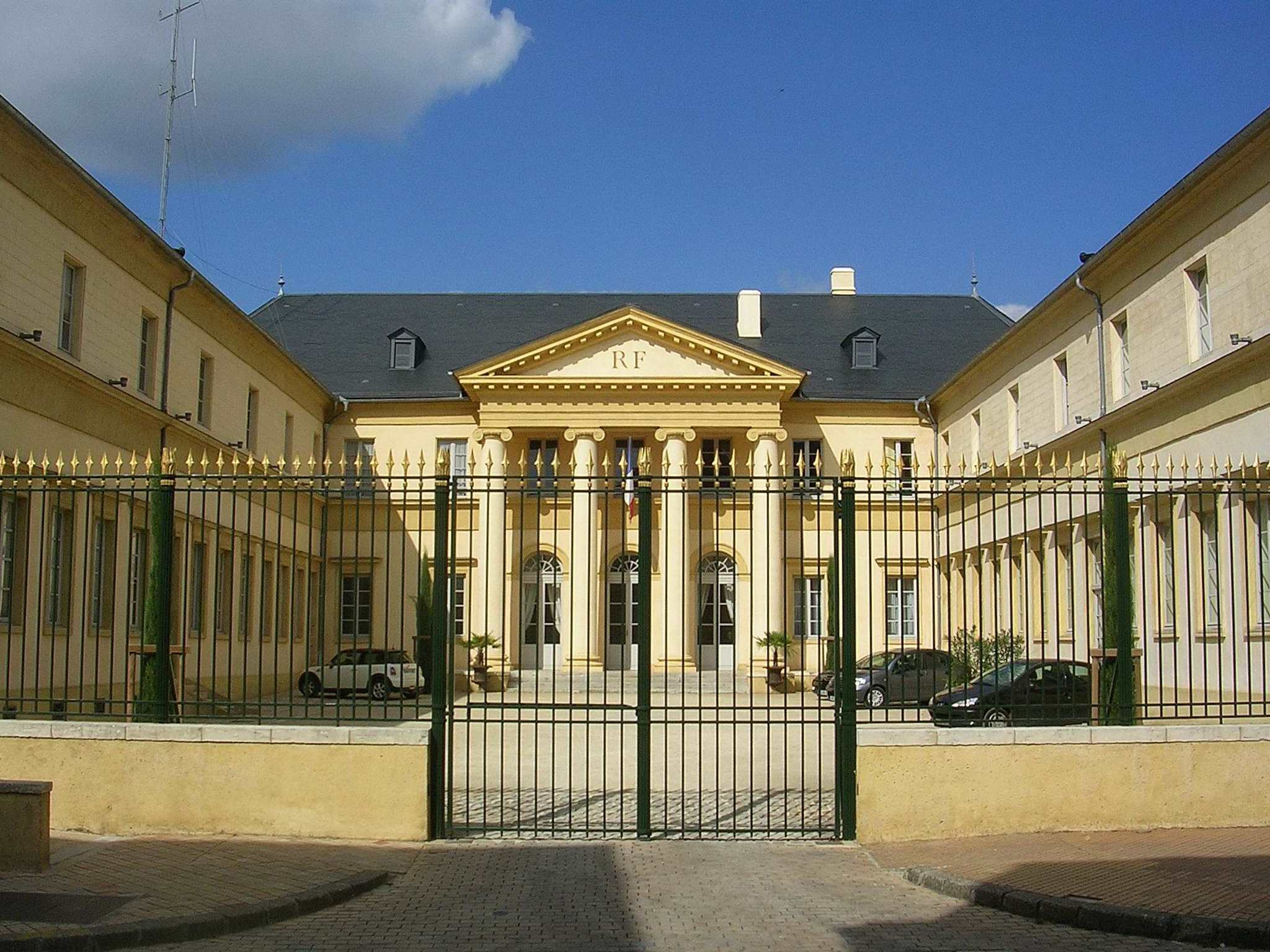
- Prefecture building in Mont-de-Marsan

- Flag Coat of arms

- Location of Landes in France
- Coordinates: 44°0′N 0°50′W
- Country: France
- Region: Nouvelle-Aquitaine
- Prefecture: Mont-de-Marsan
- Subprefecture: Dax

Government
  - President of the Departmental Council: Xavier Fortinon (PS)

Area^{1}
  - Total: 9,243 km^{2} (3,569 sq mi)

Population (2023)
  - Total: 433,570
  - Rank: 59th
  - Density: 46.91/km^{2} (121.5/sq mi)
- Time zone: UTC+1 (CET)
  - Summer (DST): UTC+2 (CEST)
- Department number: 40
- Arrondissements: 2
- Cantons: 15
- Communes: 327
- ^1 French Land Register data, which exclude estuaries and lakes, ponds and glaciers larger than 1 km^{2}

Landes (French pronunciation: [lɑ̃d]; Gascon and Occitan: Lanas [ˈlanəs]; Basque: Landak) is a department in the Nouvelle-Aquitaine region, Southwestern France, with a long coastline on the Atlantic Ocean to the west. It also borders Gers to the east, Pyrénées-Atlantiques to the south, Lot-et-Garonne to the north-east, and Gironde to the north. Located on the Atlantic coast, it had a population of 433,570 as of 2023. Its prefecture is Mont-de-Marsan.

The department is the second-largest department in France and it covers the Forest of Landes. The southwestern part of the department is part of the wider conurbation of Biarritz and Bayonne across the Pyrénées-Atlantique border.

== History ==
Landes is one of the original 83 departments that were created during the French Revolution on 4 March 1790. It was created from parts of the provinces of Guyenne and Gascony.

During the first part of the 19th century, large parts of the department were covered with poorly drained heathland (French: lande); this is the origin of the department's name. The vegetation covered rich soil and was periodically burned off, leaving excellent pasturage for sheep, which around 1850 are thought to have numbered between 900,000 and 1,000,000 in this area. The sheep were managed by shepherds who moved around on stilts and became proficient at covering long distances in boggy conditions after rain. Most of the sheep departed during the second half of the nineteenth century when systematic development of large pine plantations transformed the landscape and the local economy.

One of the most famous individuals closely related to Landes was the 19th-century French economist Frédéric Bastiat.

The Nobel Prize–winning novelist François Mauriac set his novels in the Landes.

== Geography ==
The Landes is part of the current region of Nouvelle-Aquitaine. With an area stretching over more than 9000 km^{2}, Landes is, after Gironde, the second largest department of the metropolitan French territory.

It is well known for the Côte d'Argent beach. Côte d'Argent is Europe's longest beach, and attracts many surfers to Mimizan and Soorts-Hossegor each year. It is also home to a château called Château de Gaujacq that was built in 1686.

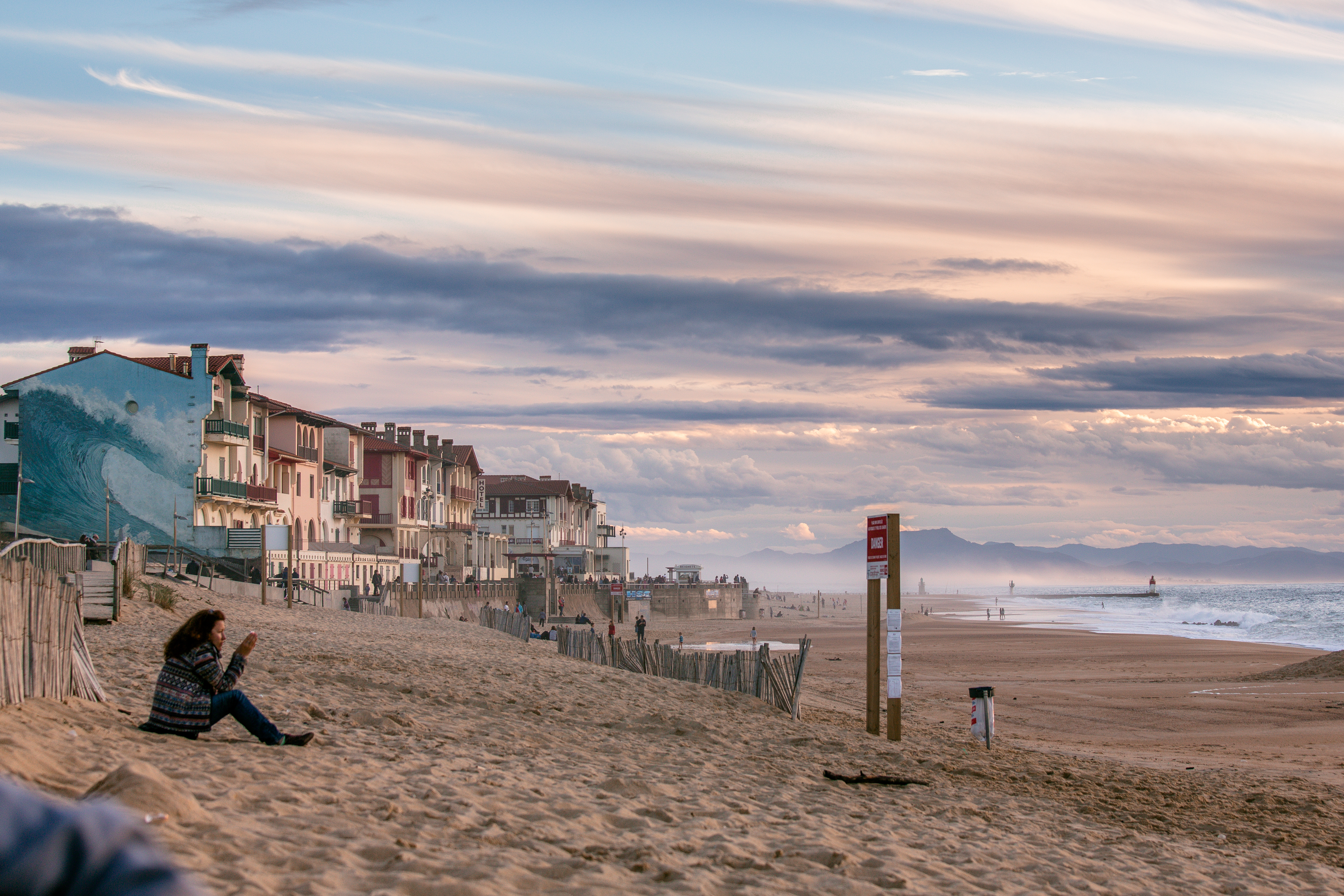
A view of Soorts-Hossegor

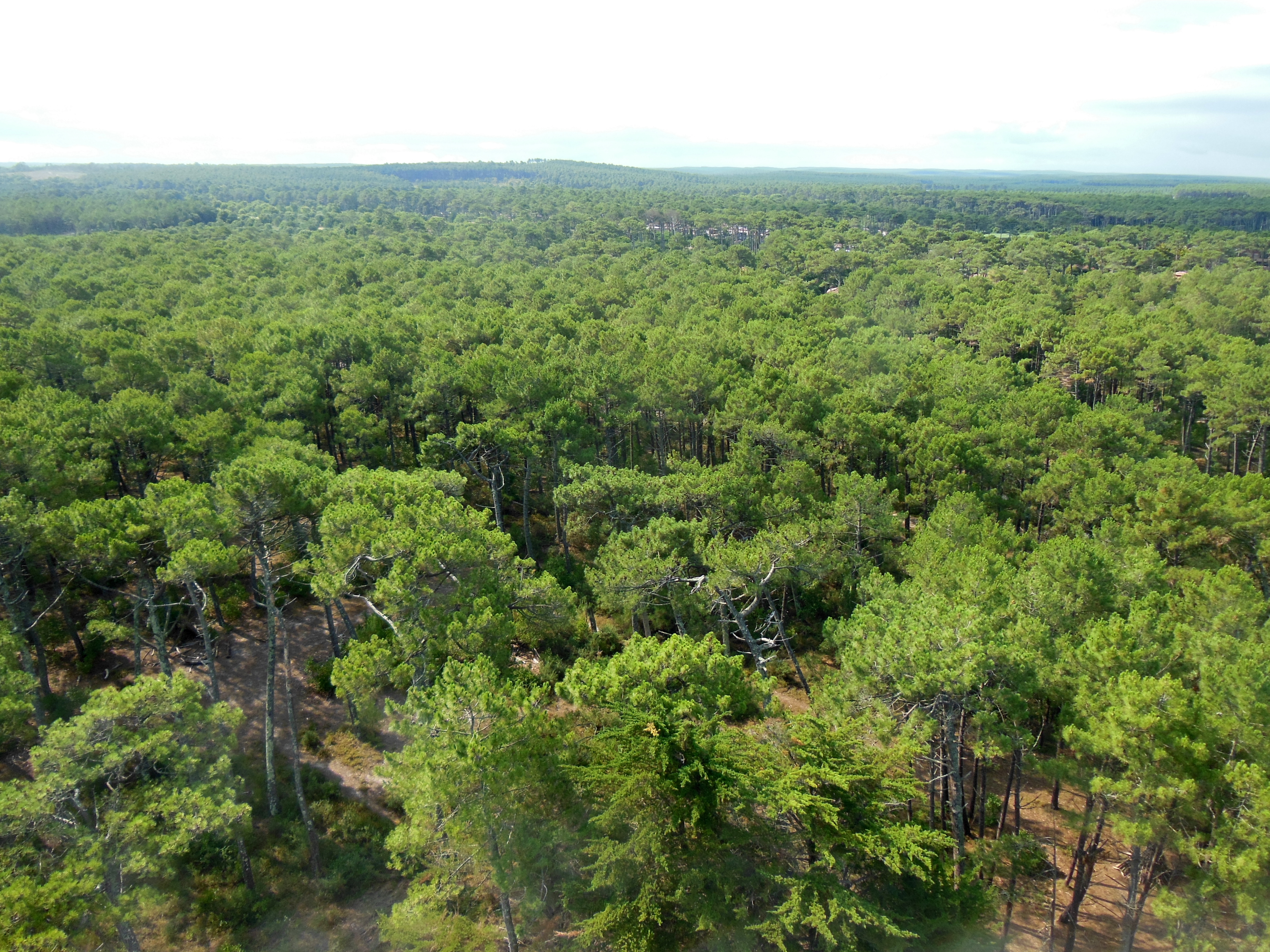
The Landes forest in Contis

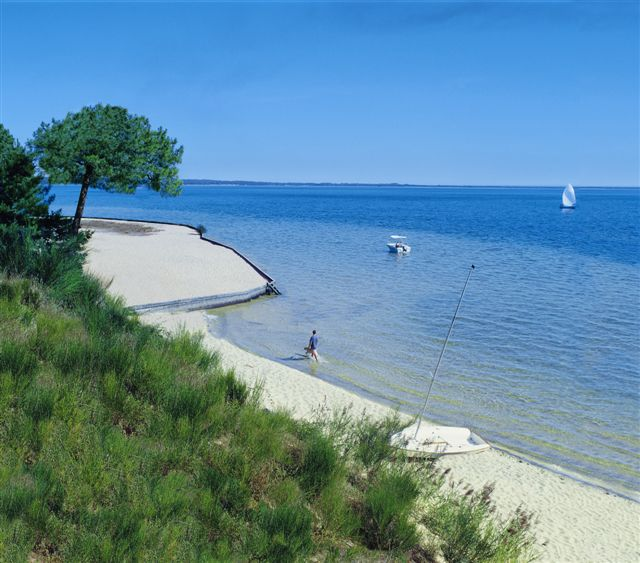
The Lake of Biscarrosse

== Demographics ==
Population development since 1801:

Historical population

Year	Pop.	±% p.a.
1801	224,272	—
1806	240,146	+1.38%
1821	256,311	+0.44%
1831	281,504	+0.94%
1841	288,077	+0.23%
1851	302,196	+0.48%
1861	300,839	−0.04%
1872	300,528	−0.01%
1881	301,143	+0.02%
1891	297,842	−0.11%
1901	291,586	−0.21%
1911	288,902	−0.09%
1921	263,937	−0.90%
1931	257,186	−0.26%

Year	Pop.	±% p.a.
1936	251,436	−0.45%
1946	248,395	−0.12%
1954	248,943	+0.03%
1962	260,495	+0.57%
1968	277,381	+1.05%
1975	288,323	+0.55%
1982	297,424	+0.44%
1990	311,461	+0.58%
1999	327,334	+0.55%
2007	367,492	+1.46%
2012	392,884	+1.35%
2017	407,444	+0.73%
2023	433,570	+1.04%

=== Principal towns ===
The most populous commune is Mont-de-Marsan, the prefecture. As of 2023, there are 6 communes with more than 10,000 inhabitants:

Commune	Population (2023)
Mont-de-Marsan	31,592
Dax	22,109
Biscarrosse	15,836
Saint-Paul-lès-Dax	14,481
Tarnos	12,957
Saint-Pierre-du-Mont	10,092

== Politics ==
=== Departmental Council of Landes ===
The president of the Departmental Council has been Xavier Fortinon of the Socialist Party since 2017. He succeeded former president of the National Assembly Henri Emmanuelli upon his death.

Party		Seats
•	Socialist Party	17
•	Left Front	3
	Union of the Republican Right and Independents	10

=== National representation ===
In the 2024 legislative election, Landes elected the following members of the National Assembly:

Constituency	Member	Party
Landes's 1st constituency	Fabien Lainé	MoDem
Landes's 2nd constituency	Lionel Causse	Renaissance
Landes's 3rd constituency	Boris Vallaud	Socialist Party

In the Senate, Landes is represented by two members: Éric Kerrouche and Monique Lubin. Both have served since the 2017 Senate election.

== Economy ==
=== Agriculture ===
Landes is known for its large pine forest which is the raw material for a timber and resin industries in the region. The forest was planted in the early nineteenth century to prevent erosion of the region's sandy soil by the sea.

=== Tourism ===
Landes is famous for its seaside resorts and natural spots, such as:

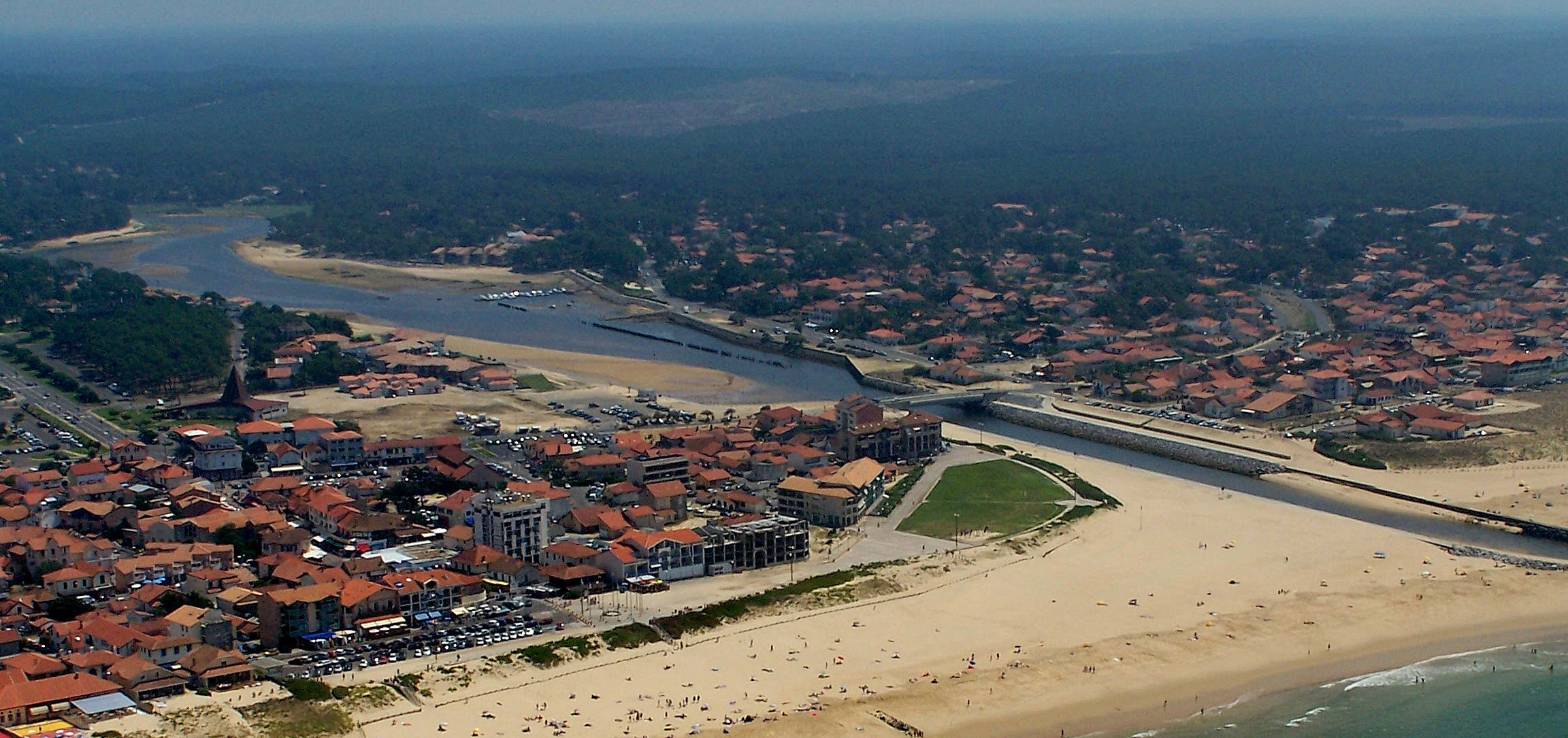
Mimizan

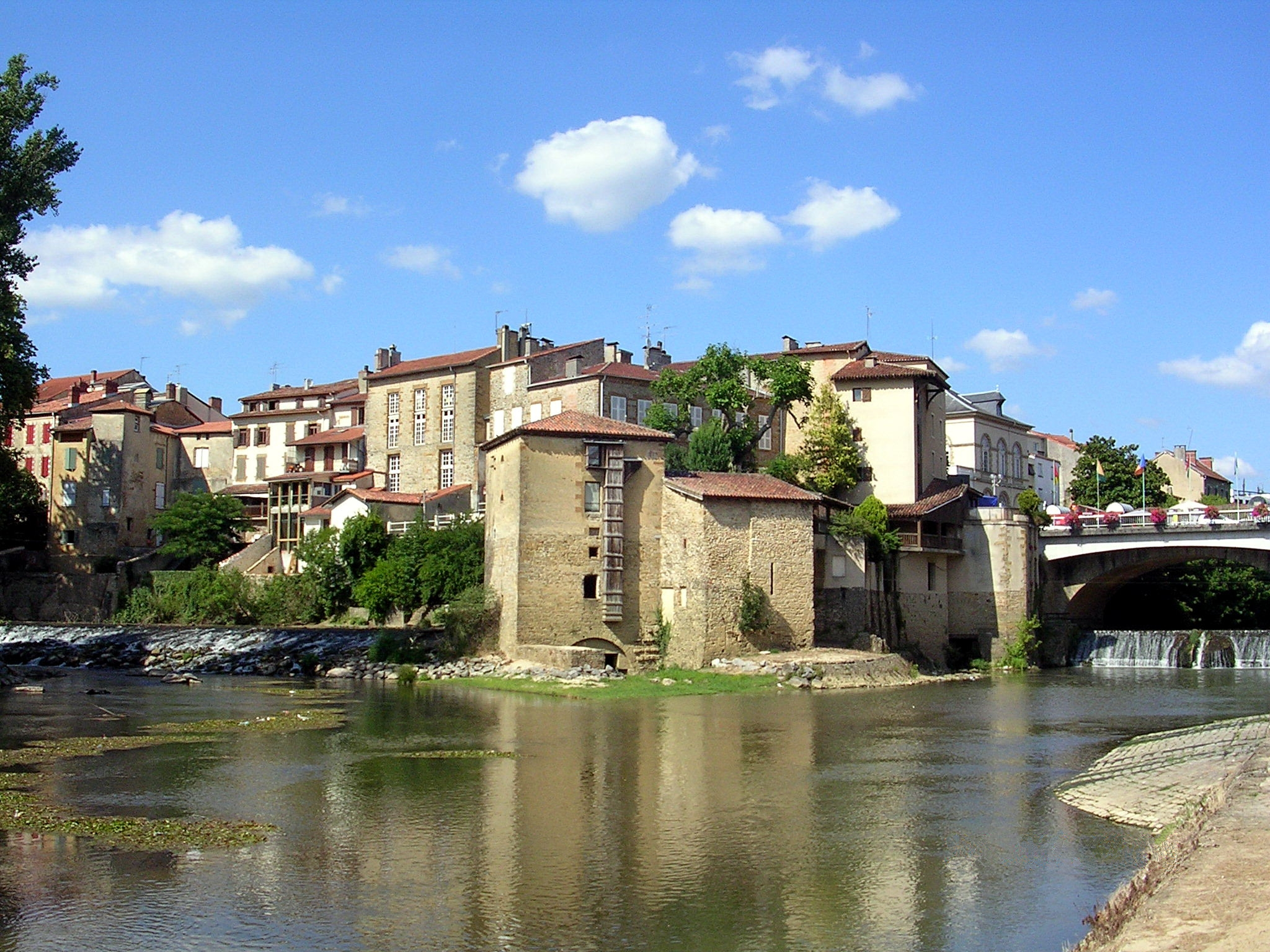
Mont-de-Marsan

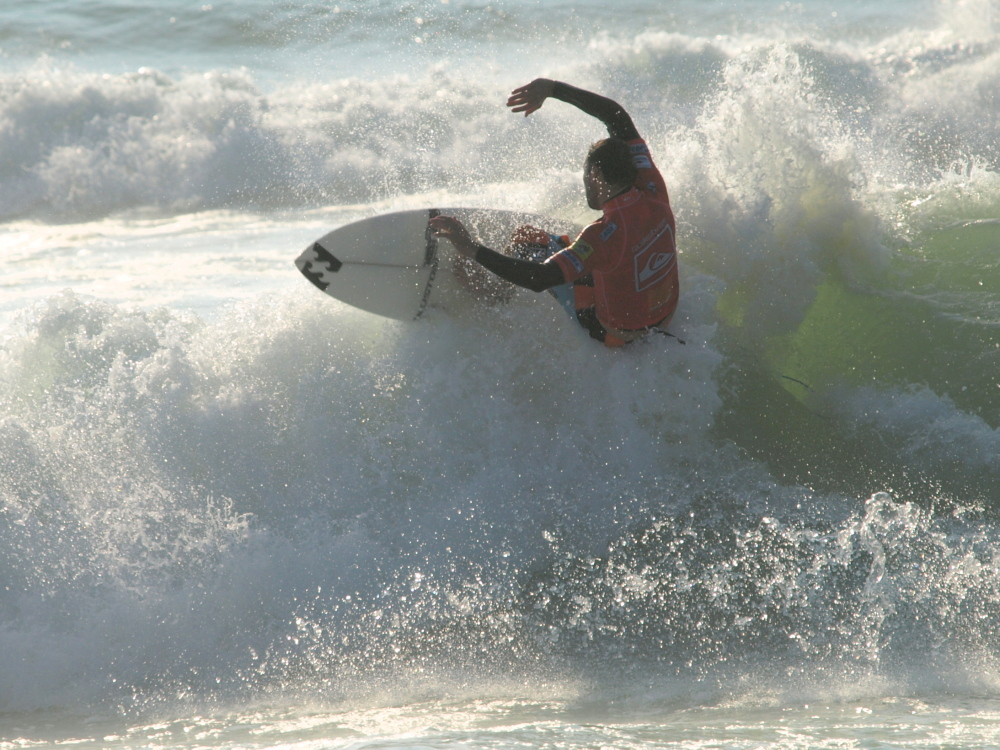
Surfer in Soorts-Hossegor

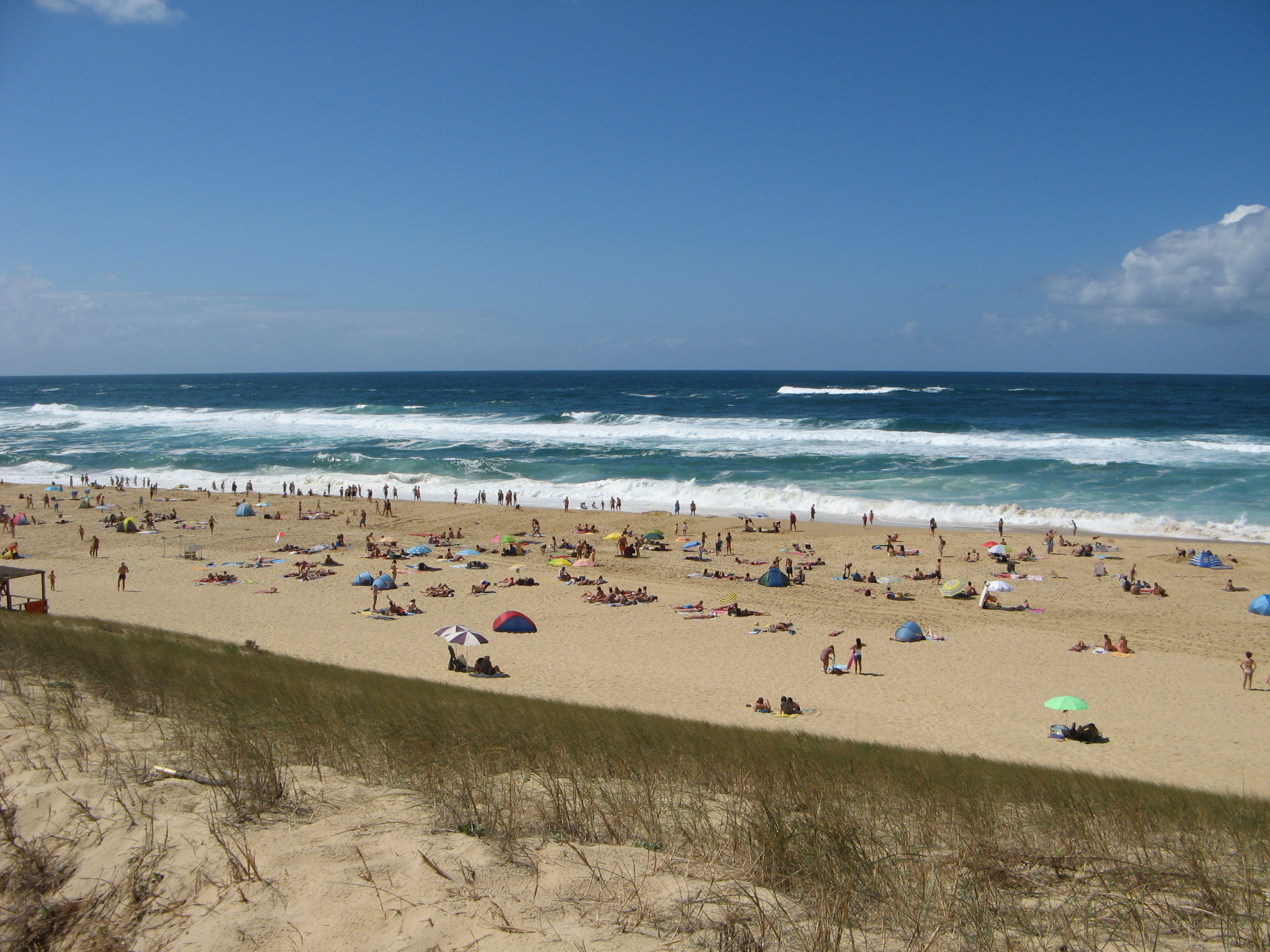
Beach in Messanges

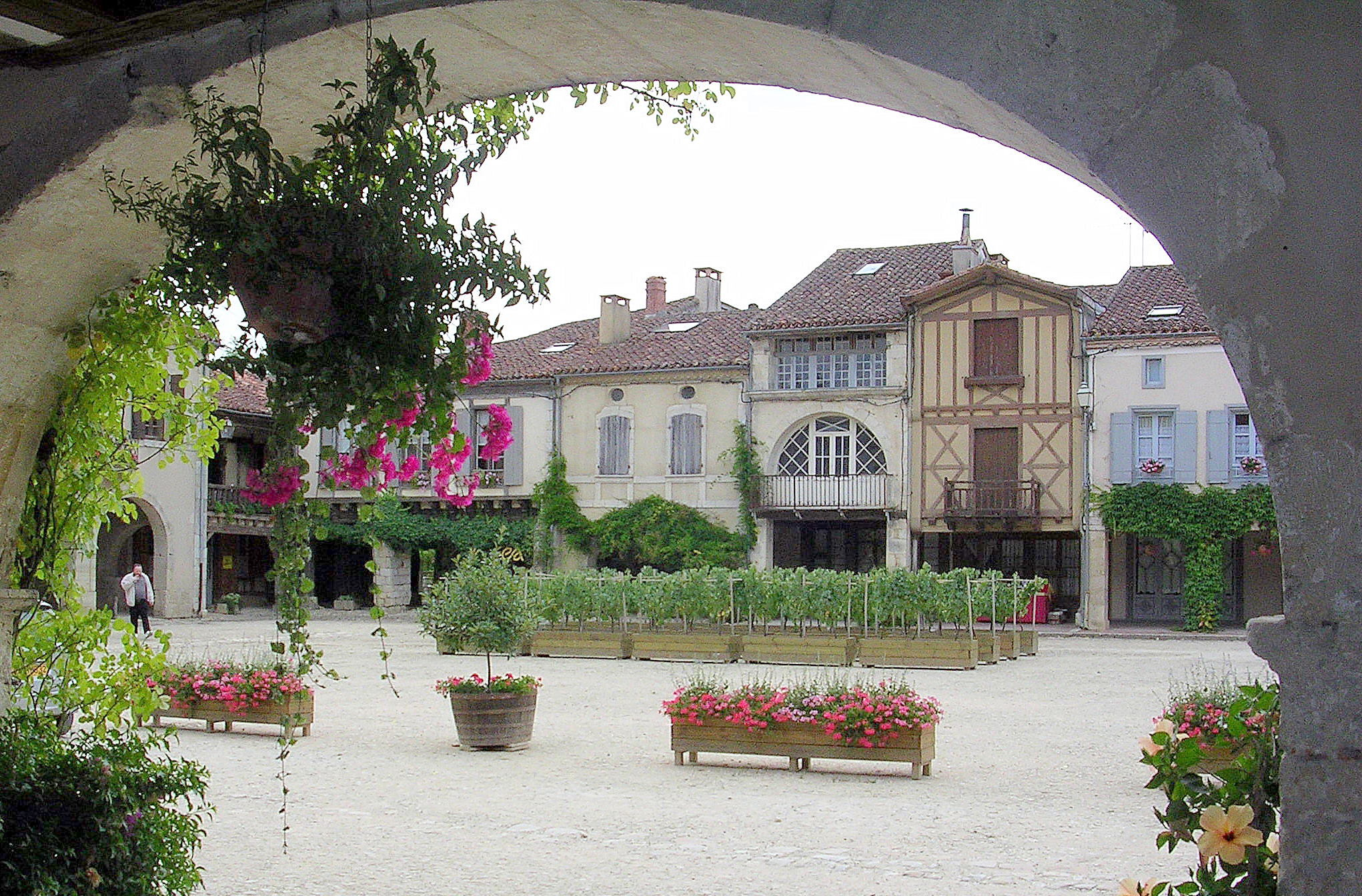
Labastide-d'Armagnac

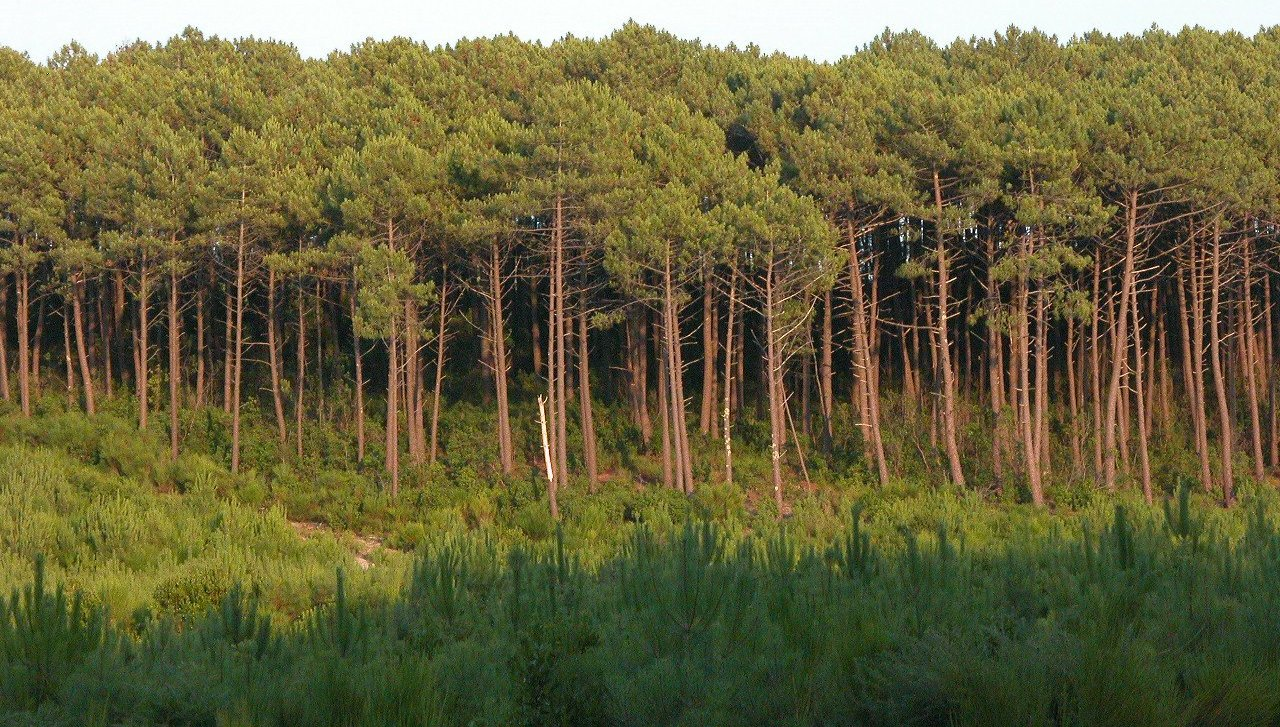
Landes forest, the largest maritime-pine forest in Europe

== See also ==
- Cantons of the Landes department
- Communes of the Landes department
- Arrondissements of the Landes department
- Château de Belhade
- Château de Castillon
- Château de Lacaze
- Château de Ravignan
- Château du Prada
