= Vénus impudique =

Paleolithic figurine found in France

Immodest Venus
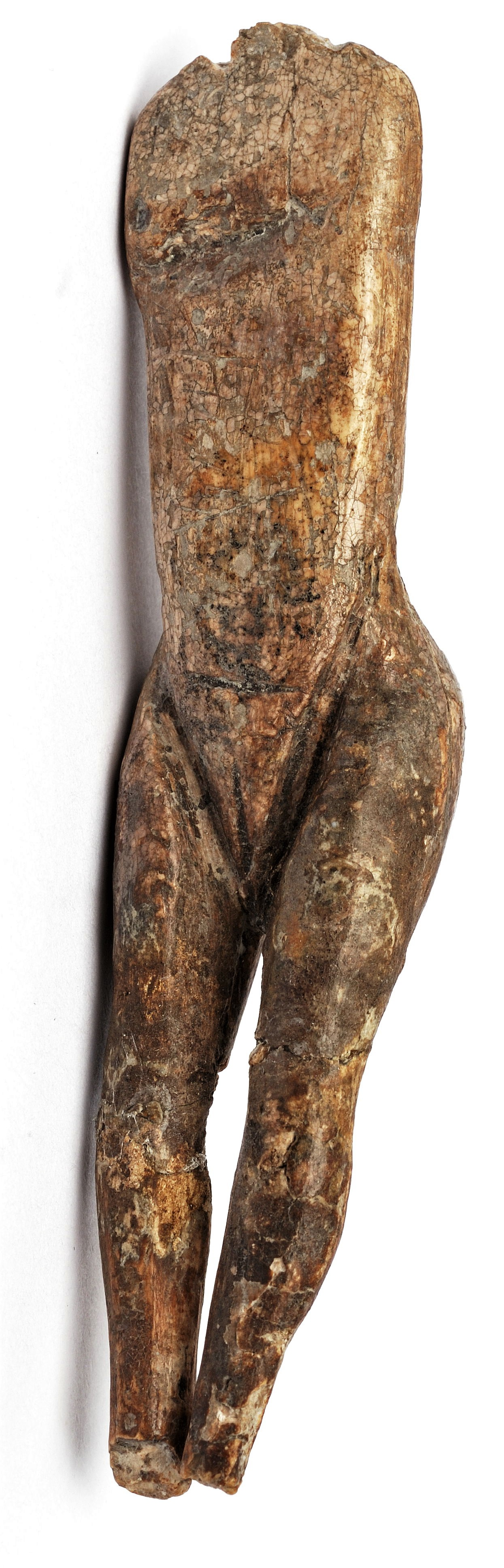
- Material: Ivory
- Height: 8 cm
- Created: 17,000 to 14,000 years
- Discovered: c. 1864; Dordogne, France
- Discovered by: Paul Hurault

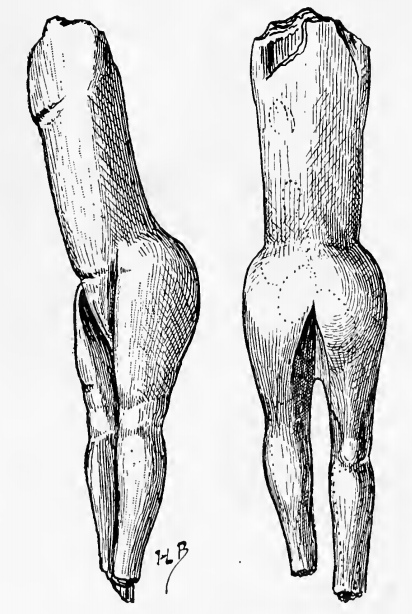
Vénus impudique, 1907 drawing

The Vénus impudique ("Immodest Venus", also known as Venus Impudica and Vénus de Vibraye) is the first Paleolithic sculptural representation of a woman discovered in modern times. It was found by Paul Hurault, 8th Marquis de Vibraye in about 1864 at the famous archaeological site of Laugerie-Basse in the Vézère valley (one of the many important Stone Age sites in and around the commune of Les Eyzies-de-Tayac-Sireuil in Dordogne, southwestern France).

== Features ==
The Magdalenian "Venus" from Laugerie-Basse is headless, footless, armless but with a strongly incised vulva. The figurine is eight centimetres tall and carved from ivory. Despite 'Venus' suggesting fertility, its features and flat stomach lead some to believe the figure depicts a young girl.

== Meaning and significance of the name ==
The Marquis de Vibraye named it La Vénus impudique or Venus Impudica ("immodest Venus"), contrasting it to the Venus Pudica. Venus Pudica was a class of Roman sculptures depicting the goddess Venus who, unlike the Venus Impudique, were covering her naked pubis with her right hand, and her breasts with the other. It is from this name that we get the term "Venus figurines" commonly used for Stone Age sculptures of this kind.

=== Goddess of Beauty ===
The name given to Venus Impudique by the Marquis de Vibraye was significant in setting the precedent for the names of subsequent Upper Palaeolithic figures that have been found since. Subsequently, Upper Palaeolithic female figurines have collectively been named "Venus figurines" which derives from the Roman goddess of beauty, Venus. Despite considerable diversity in opinion amongst archeologists and in paleoanthropological literature as to the function and significance of the figures, the name arises from the assumption that the figurines represent an ancient ideal of beauty. This perception is said to have derived from the fact that attention is directed to certain features common to most of the figurines. In particular, emotionally charged primary and secondary sexual characteristics, such as, the breasts, stomachs and buttocks. However, somewhat ironically, the figurines predate the mythological figure of Venus by thousands of years. As a result, critics, such as Vandewettering, have highlighted that this could be a reflection of androcentric interpretations of the Venus figurines that, she suggests, were the starting point for archaeological understandings.

== See also ==
- Venus figurine
- Vénus impudique - French Wikipedia
