= Paul Hurault, 8th Marquis de Vibraye =

Paul Hurault 8th Marquis de Vibraye
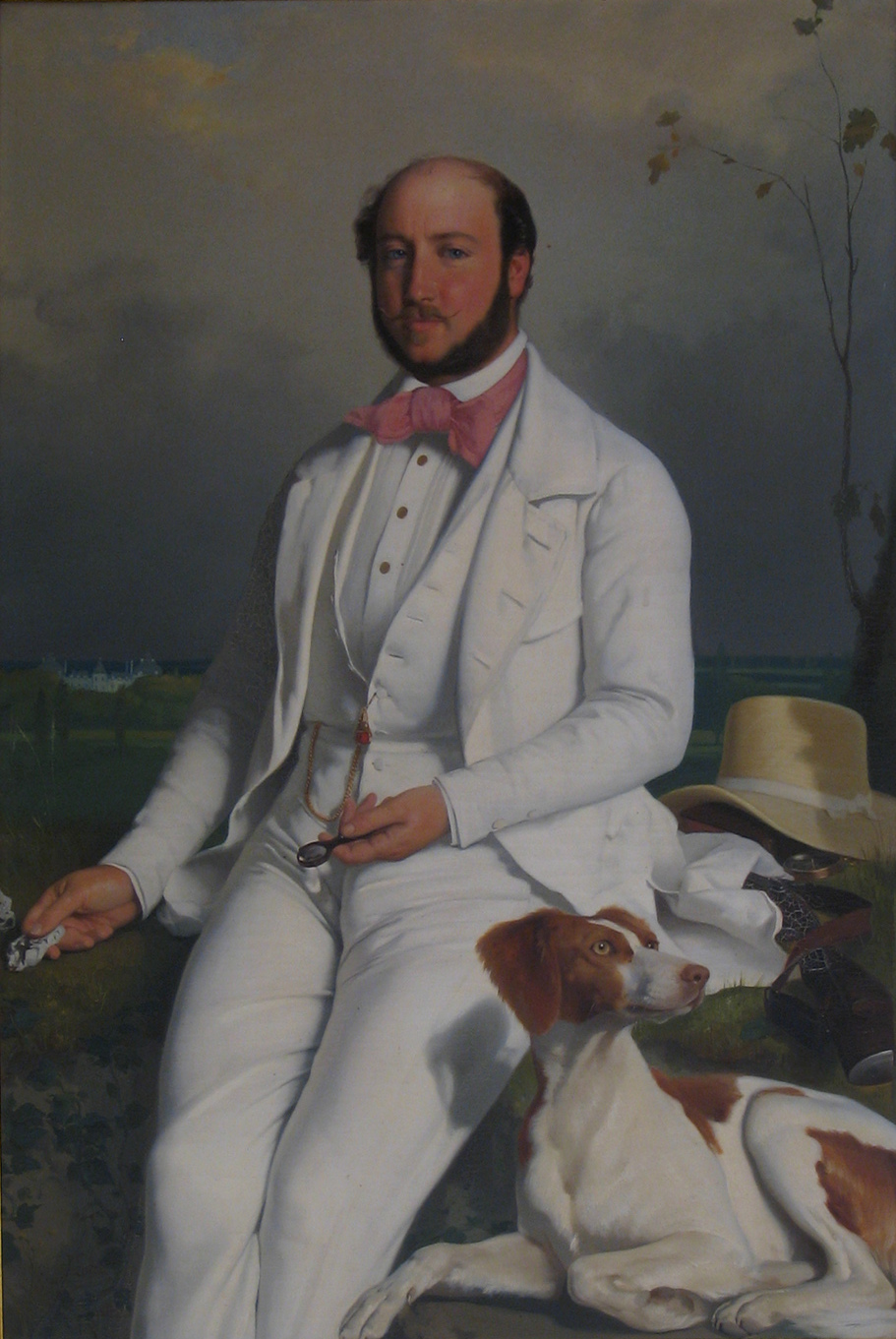
- Paul Hurault, 8th Marquis de Vibraye (painting at Château de Cheverny)
- Born: Guillaume-Paul Louis Maximilien Hurault; 1809
- Died: 1878 (aged 68–69)
- Occupation: Amateur archaeologist
- Father: Anne-Louis Victor Denis Hurault, 7th Marquis de Vibraye

Paul Hurault, 8th Marquis de Vibraye (1809–1878) was an amateur archaeologist from France.

He was born Guillaume-Paul Louis Maximilien Hurault, son of a notable politician and military officer, Anne-Louis Victor Denis Hurault.

He discovered the very first Paleolithic sculptural representation of a woman in modern times. It was found in about 1864 at the famous archaeological site of Laugerie-Basse in the Vézère valley (one of the many important Stone Age sites in and around the commune of Les Eyzies-de-Tayac-Sireuil in Dordogne, southwestern France). The Magdalenian "Venus" from Laugerie-Basse is headless, footless, armless, but with a strongly incised vaginal opening. De Vibraye named it La Vénus impudique or Venus Impudica ("immodest Venus"), contrasting it to the Venus Pudica, a Hellenistic sculpture by Praxiteles showing Aphrodite covering her naked pubis with her right hand. This name led to the term "Venus figurines," commonly used to describe Stone Age sculptures of this kind.
