= Laugerie-Basse =

Cave and archaeological site in France

The Abri of Laugerie Basse
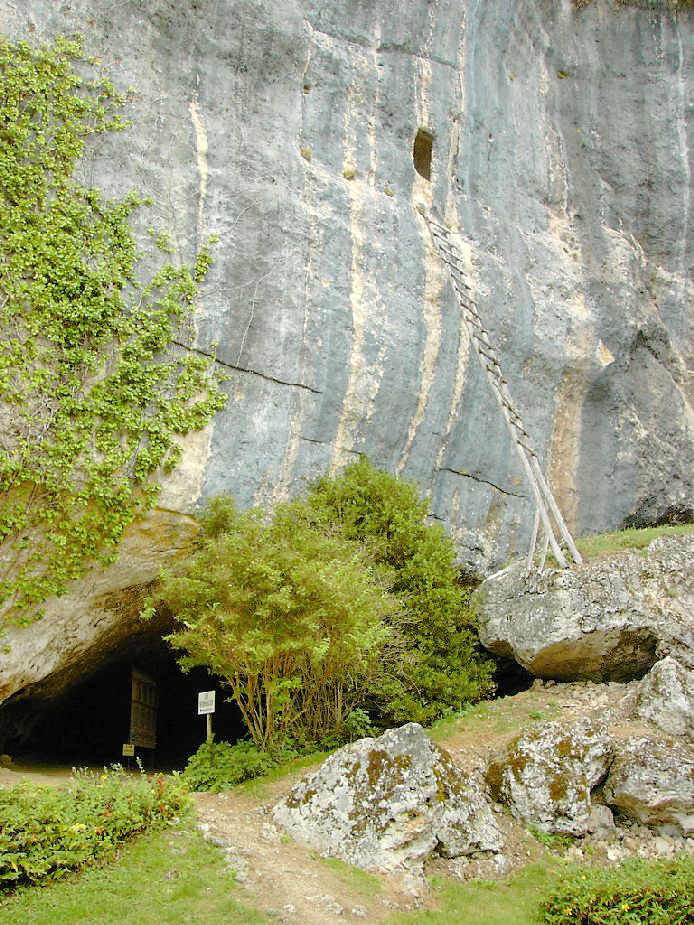
- The Abri of Laugerie Basse

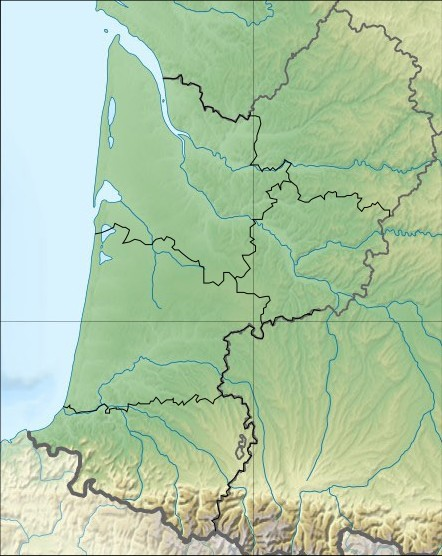
- Location in France Laugerie-Basse (France)
- 44°34′13″N 0°35′44″E
- Cultures: Magdalenian
- Location: near Eyzies-de-Tayac,
- Region: Dordogne, France

Site notes
- Excavation dates: 1901,
- Archaeologists: Denis Peyrony

UNESCO World Heritage Site
- Type: Cultural
- Criteria: i, iii
- Designated: 1979 (3rd session)
- Part of: Prehistoric Sites and Decorated Caves of the Vézère Valley
- Reference no.: 85

Laugerie-Basse is an important Upper Paleolithic archaeological site within the territory of the French commune Les Eyzies-de-Tayac-Sireuil in Dordogne. It is known for several works of art from the Magdalenian. In 1979, Laugerie-Basse, along with other nearby Paleolithic sites, was inscribed on the UNESCO World Heritage List as Prehistoric Sites and Decorated Caves of the Vézère Valley.

== Geography, geology and location ==
The impressive abri of Laugerie-Basse, named after the village, is located on the right side of the Vézère valley, about 2 kilometers upstream from Les Eyzies. It was formed at the bottom of a 45 meters high and 500 meters long scarp slope of flat-lying limestones from the Coniacian. The 15-meter-deep Abri is located 15 meters above river level. Taking advantage of the natural conditions, the houses of Laugerie-Basse were built directly into the rocks so that building a back wall and the back half of the roof was dispensable.

The prehistoric site consists of two abris: the main abri and 50 meters upstream the Abri of Marseilles.

Between the abris and the Vézère the D 47 runs from Périgueux to Les Eyzies.

== History ==
In 1863 Édouard Lartet and Henry Christy began for the first time with excavations on the main abri. At that time a small farm with a barn and a stable was standing on the excavation area. Lartet and Christy were succeeded by the Marquis de Vibraye and his assistant Franchet and shortly thereafter by Massénat. The excavations on the main abri were rather chaotic for the next five decades. Only between 1912 and 1913 Denis Peyrony and Maury were able to proceed more systematically and make the first stratigraphy of the main abri. Maury then moved on to the hitherto disregarded Abri des Marseilles where he was active until 1920.

== Stratigraphy ==
The stratigraphy in the main abri comprises archaeological material mainly from Magdalenian III and Magdalenian IV. There is also some marginal evidence of the Azilian. In the slope waste in front of the scarp slope remains from the Neolithic and the late Bronze Age were also discovered.

The Abri de Marseilles offers a more detailed stratigraphic sequence: the original profile is still existing. From it one can conclude that the Magdalenians settled approximately 14,000 years ago directly on the existing bottom of the abri. They lived at the abri until the Magdalenian VI. Then a catastrophic collapse of the roof occurred and the settlement site was partly strewn with some huge slabs of rock and debris. Afterwards the people returned to this place, which is clearly evident from traces of settlement on and between the boulders. Thereafter the Abri des Marseilles sank completely into oblivion until the late Neolithic . Around 2000 BC members of the Artenac culture arrived who left an enormous, and in this magnitude inexplicable, ash and charcoal layer that covered the whole abri. Further slides of the roof later occurred bringing about a spectacular collapse with up to 10 meter high boulders.

By now the main abri has been cleaned up completely, whereas the Abri des Marseilles has only been partially explored.

== Found artifacts ==
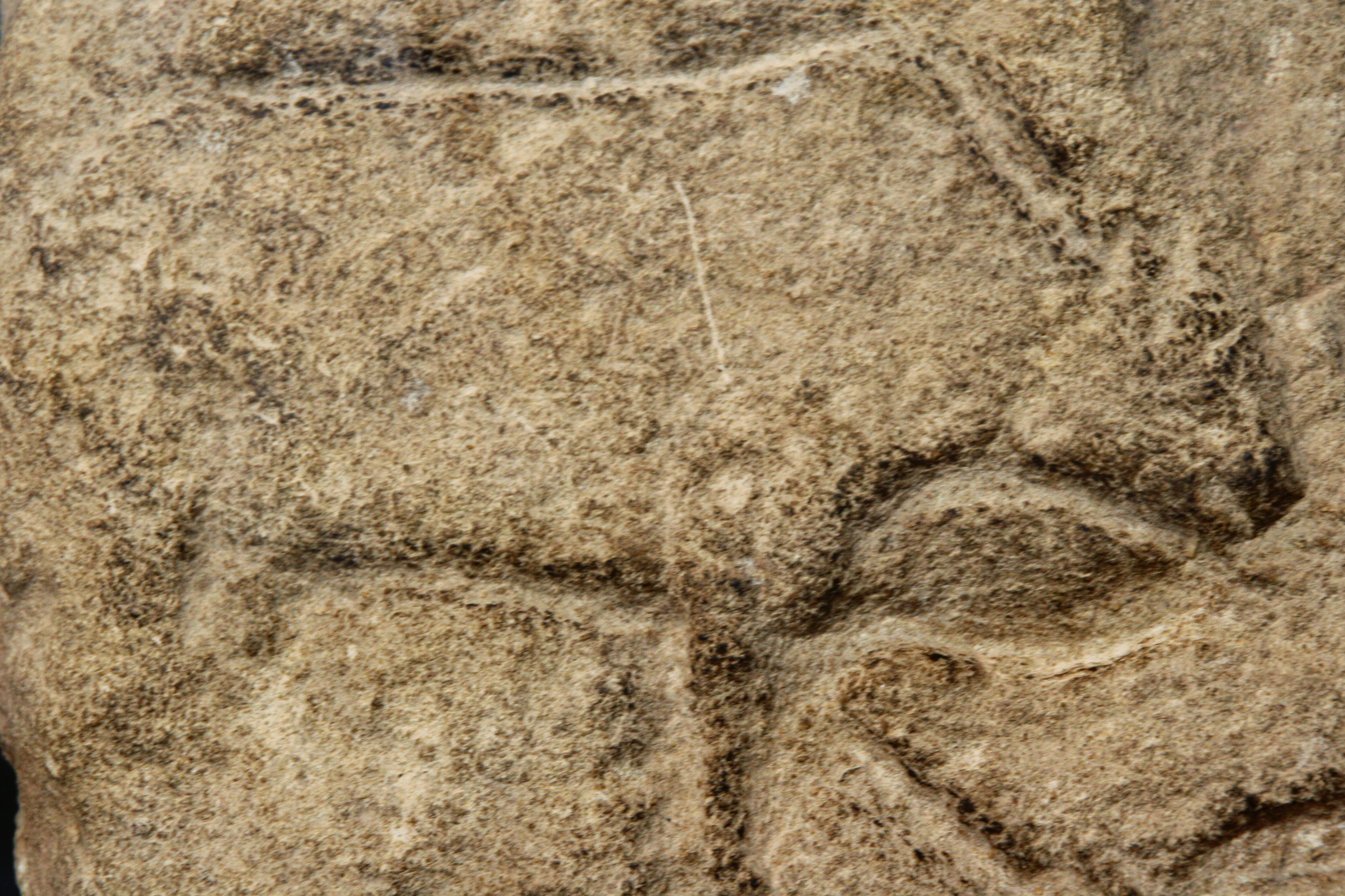
Aurochs engraving

Apart from stone artefacts and other tools, all in all approximately 600 art objects from the Magdalenian were recovered in Laugerie-Basse. In Laugerie-Basse Paul Hurault, 8th Marquis de Vibraye discovered in 1864 the "Immodest Venus" (French: Vénus impudique) which gave its name to the genre of Paleolithic Venus figurines. Shortly after that, around 1867–68, the Woman under the reindeer (la femme au renne) was discovered by Abbé Landesque. Many of these early art pieces are now scattered in museums all over the world. Pierced bone rondels picturing chamoises and deer have been discovered from the middle Magdalenian (stage IV).

== Age ==
The main abri was inhabited in the middle and upper Magdalenian as well as in the Azilian, which roughly corresponds to the time segment from 14,000 until 10,000 years BP.

The Abri des Marseilles has had a longer settlement period, it had been inhabited during the entire Magdalenian and into the Neolithic which corresponds to the time segment from 17,000 until 7,000 years BP.

== Literature ==
- Delluc, B.; Delluc, G.; Roussot, A.; Roussot-Larroque, J. (1990), Connaître la préhistoire en Périgord (in French), Éditions SUD-OUEST, ISBN 2-879010-48-9
