= Marquis de Vibraye =

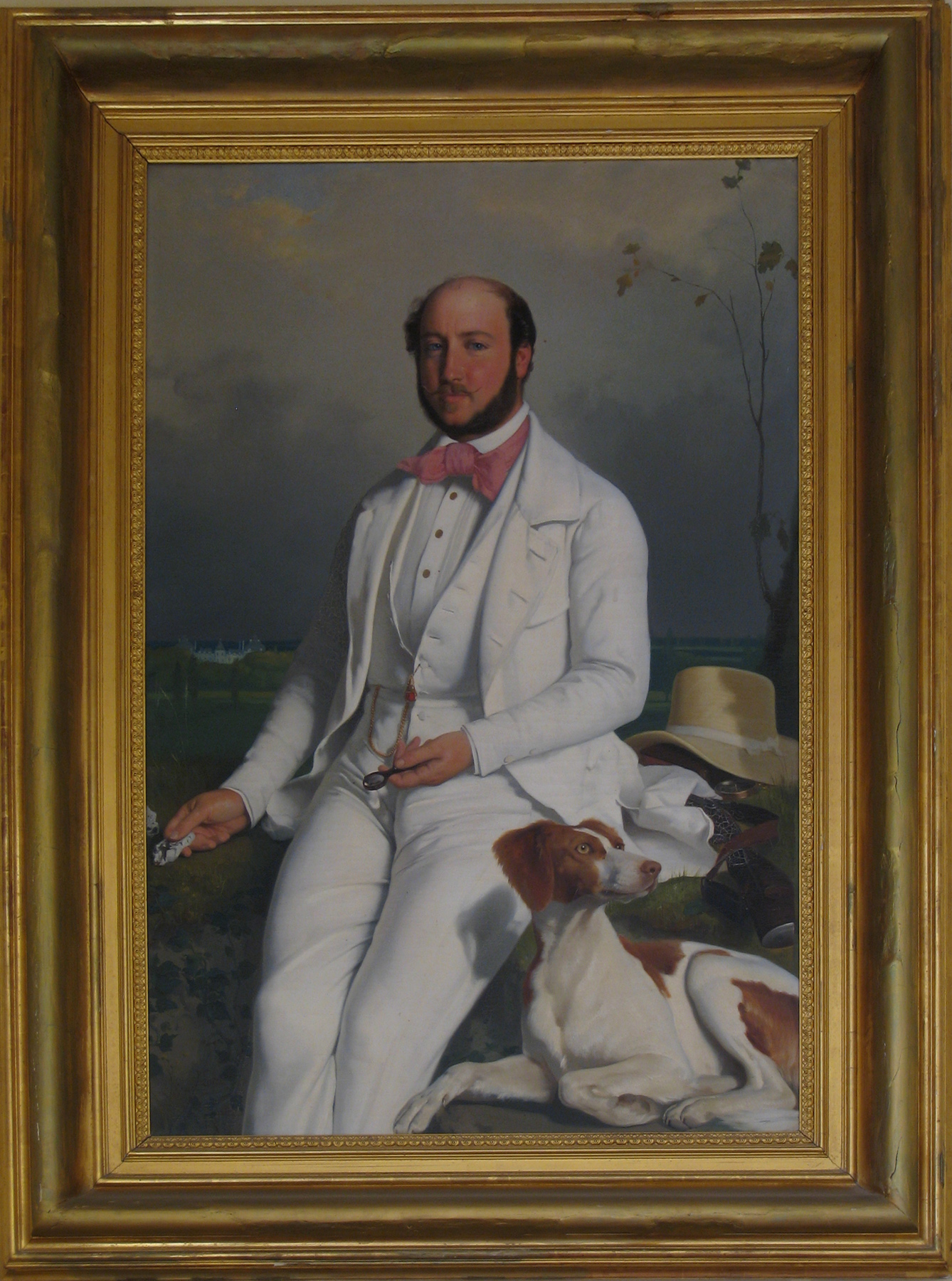
- Creation date: 1625
- First holder: Jacques Hurault
- Present holder: Henri de Vibraye
- Seat: Château de Cheverny in the Loire Valley in France

Marquis de Vibraye is the name of the title held by the Hurault family. This title was created by letters patent in 1625 and is still held by the family. Their family seat is Château de Cheverny in the Loire Valley in France and Château de Semur-en-Vallon.

Title holders:

- Jacques Hurault, 1st Marquis de Vibraye
- Jacques Hurault, 2nd Marquis de Vibraye
- Henri-Emmanuel Hurault, 3rd Marquis de Vibraye
- Henri-Eléonorn Hurault, 4th Marquis de Vibraye
- Paul-Maximilien Hurault, 5th Marquis de Vibraye
- Louis Hurault, 6th Marquis de Vibraye
- Anne-Louis Victor Denis Hurault, 7th Marquis de Vibraye^{(fr)} (1767–1843), politician and military officer
- Guillaume-Paul Louis Maximilien Hurault, 8th Marquis de Vibraye (1809–1878), amateur archaeologist
- ...
- Louis de Vibraye, the current Marquis de Vibraye

== See also ==
- List of French marquisates
