= Magdalenian =

Upper Paleolithic and Mesolithic cultures

- Distribution of Magdalenian sites in Europe (pink) along with those of the Epigravettian (red). Distribution of the Magdalenian in southern Britain not shown
- Religion: Paleolithic religion
- Geographical range: Western Europe
- Period: Upper Paleolithic; Mesolithic
- Dates: c. 21,000 - 13,000 BP
- Type site: Abri de la Madeleine
- Major sites: Cave of Altamira, Kents Cavern, Lascaux
- Preceded by: Cro-Magnon, Aurignacian, Solutrean
- Followed by: Western Hunter Gatherer, Epigravettian, Azilian, Ahrensburg culture

The Magdalenian (also Madelenian; French: Magdalénien) is a technocomplex of the Late Upper Paleolithic in parts of Western and Central Europe. It dates from around 21,000 to 13,000 years Before Present. It is named after the type site of Abri de la Madeleine, a rock shelter (abri) located in the Vézère valley of Tursac in Dordogne, France.

Édouard Lartet and Henry Christy originally termed the period L'âge du renne "the age of the reindeer". They conducted the first archaeological excavation of the type site, publishing in 1875. The Magdalenian is associated with reindeer hunters. Magdalenian sites contain extensive evidence for the hunting of red deer, wild horses, and other megafauna present in Europe toward the end of the Last Glacial Period. The culture was geographically widespread, and later Magdalenian sites stretched from Portugal in the west to Poland in the east, and as far north as France, the Channel Islands, England, and Wales. Besides la Madeleine, the chief stations of the Magdalenian are Les Eyzies, Laugerie-Basse, and Gorges d'Enfer in the Dordogne; Grotte du Placard in Charente and others in Southwest France.

Magdalenian peoples produced a wide variety of art, including figurines and cave paintings. Evidence has been found suggesting that Magdalenian peoples regularly engaged in cannibalism along with producing skull cups.

Genetic studies indicate that the Magdalenian peoples were descended mainly from earlier Western European Cro-Magnon groups like the Gravettians present in Western Europe over 30,000 years ago before the Last Glacial Maximum (LGM), who had retreated to southwestern Europe during the LGM. Magdalenian peoples were largely replaced by peoples belonging to the Epigravettian-associated Western Hunter Gatherer (WHG) genetic cluster at the end of the Pleistocene, though in the Iberian Peninsula early Holocene hunter-gatherers retained significant Magdalenian-related ancestry.

== Chronology and technology ==
The Magdalenian complex is widely thought to have originated in the region comprising Southwestern France and Northern Spain. It is thought to have emerged from the preceding Solutrean culture in the region, differentiated from the Solutrean by its increased usage of bone points. The earliest forms of the Magdalenian are either known as the Archaic Magdalenian or the Badegoulian. Magdalenian peoples migrated northwards to recolonise northern Europe around 15,000 years ago following the end of the harsh cold conditions of the Oldest Dryas, reaching northwards to Britain, and as far east as Poland. At this time, another culture, the Epigravettian, existed spanning from the Italian Peninsula to westernmost Russia.

The Magdalenian is divided into six phases generally agreed to have chronological significance (Magdalenian I through VI, I being the earliest and VI being the latest). The earliest phases are recognised by the varying proportion of blades and specific varieties of scrapers, the middle phases marked by the emergence of a microlithic component (particularly the distinctive denticulated microliths), and the later phases by the presence of uniserial (phase 5) and biserial 'harpoons' (phase 6) made of bone, antler and ivory. Alternatively, the Magdalenian is chronologically divided into the Lower, Middle, and Upper Magdalenian.

The Magdalenian shows the extensive use of antler and bone tools, including the production of barbed points, as well as spear throwers. As with earlier Upper Palaeolithic European cultures, they also produced perforated batons out of antlers, which have an unclear function but may have been used for making rope.

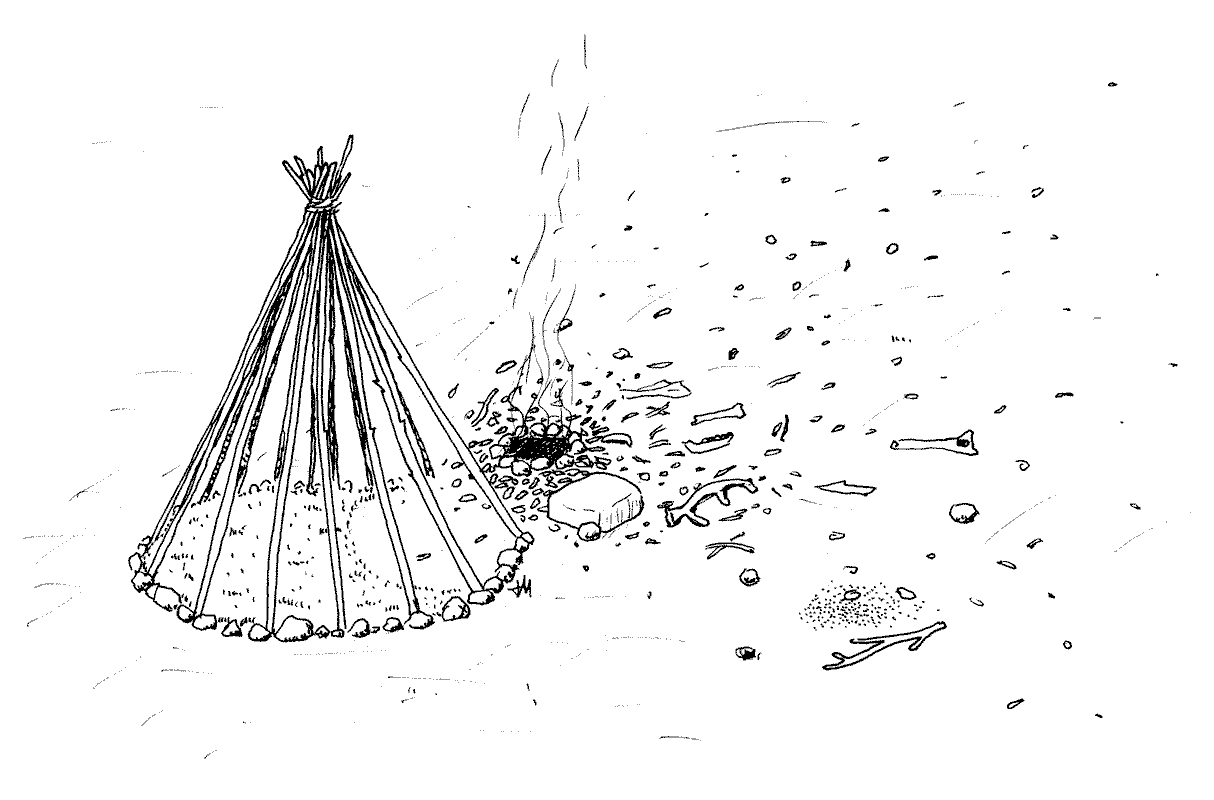
Magdalenian people dwelt in tents such as this one of Pincevent (France) that dates to 12,000 years ago.

The large amounts of exotic sea shells and fossils found in Magdalenian sites may be sourced to relatively precise areas and have been used to support hypotheses of Magdalenian hunter-gatherer seasonal ranges, and a complex trade network spanning even into parts of the British Isles.

In northern Spain and south-west France this tool culture was superseded by the Azilian culture. In northern Europe it was followed by variants of the Tjongerian techno-complex.

Members of the Magdalenian culture possessed domestic dogs related to modern dogs.

== Art ==
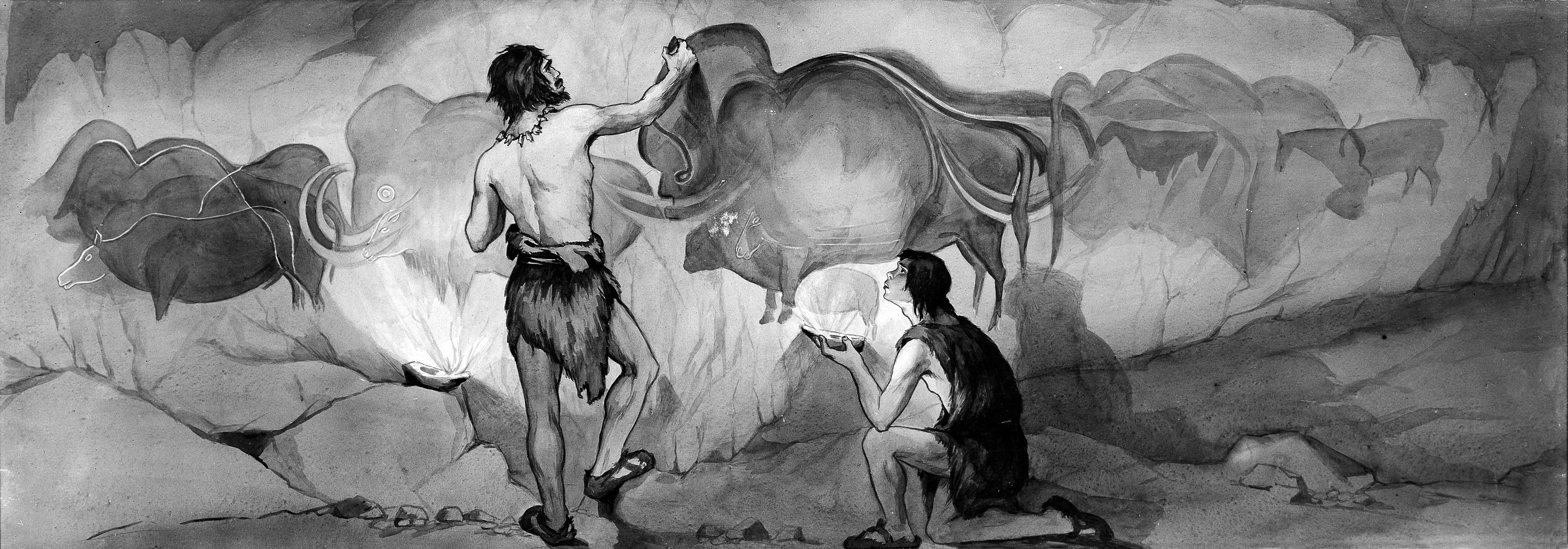
Magdalenian cave painting

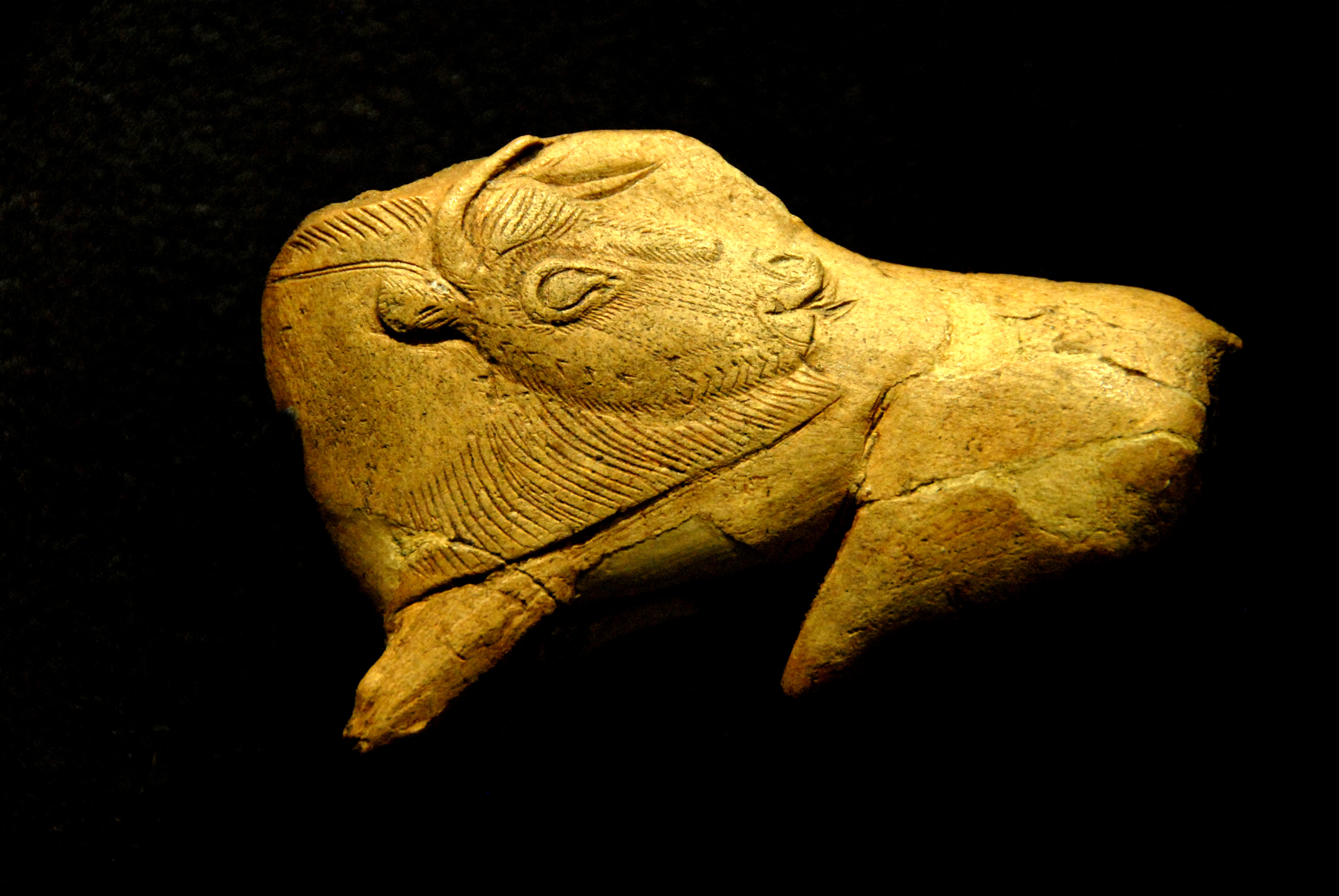
Bison Licking Insect Bite, a Magdalenian antler carving from France, dating to c. 15,000 years ago

Bones, reindeer antlers and animal teeth display pictures carved or etched on them of seals, fish, reindeer, mammoths and other creatures.

In the Tuc d'Audoubert cave, an 18-inch clay statue of two bison sculpted in relief was discovered in the deepest room, now known as the Room of the Bisons.

Examples of Magdalenian portable art include batons, figurines, and intricately engraved projectile points, as well as items of personal adornment including sea shells, perforated carnivore teeth (presumably necklaces), and fossils.

Cave sites such as Lascaux contain the best known examples of Magdalenian cave art. The site of Altamira in Spain, with its extensive and varied forms of Magdalenian mobiliary art has been suggested to be an agglomeration site where groups of Magdalenian hunter-gatherers congregated.

== Gallery ==
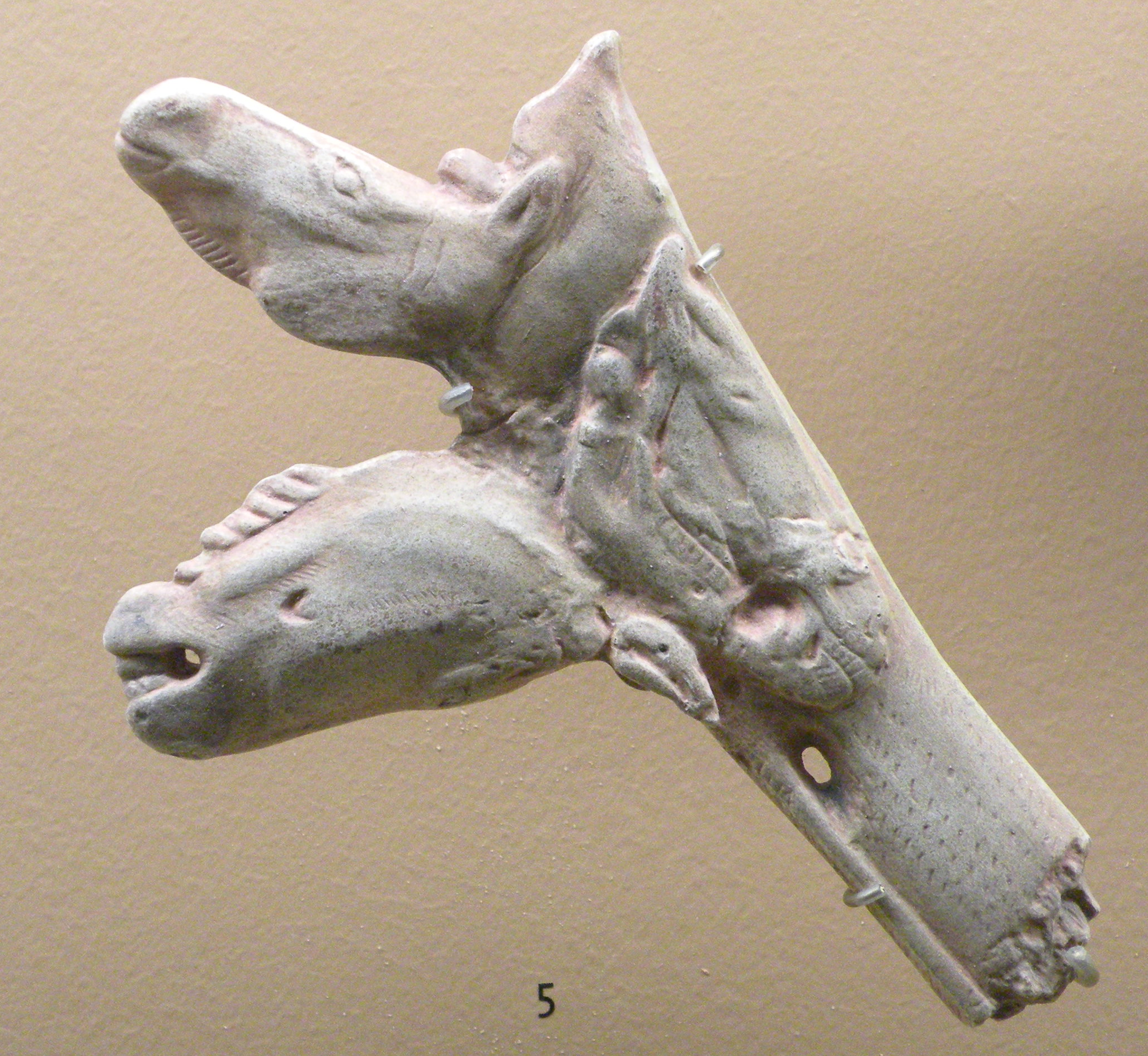

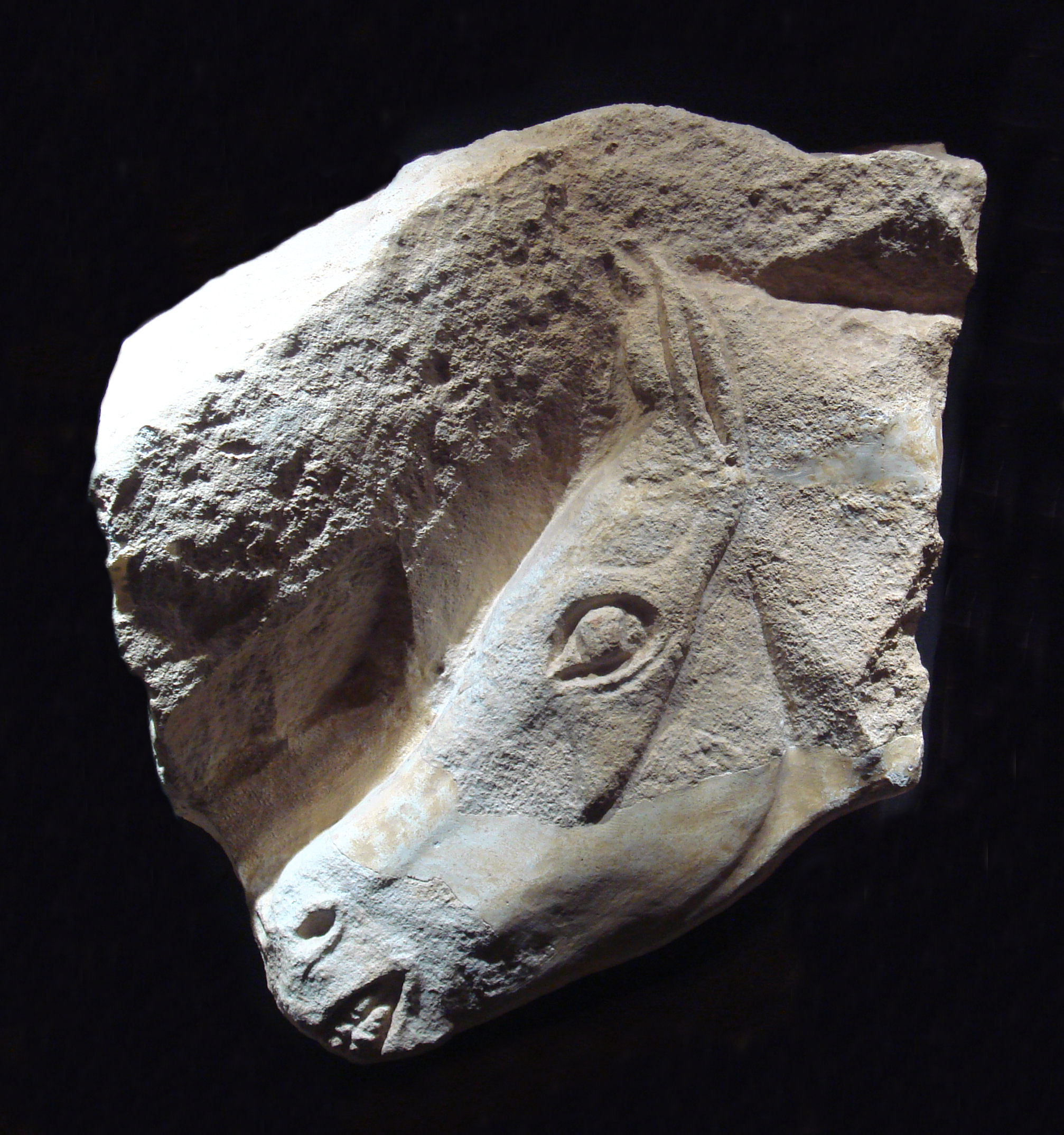

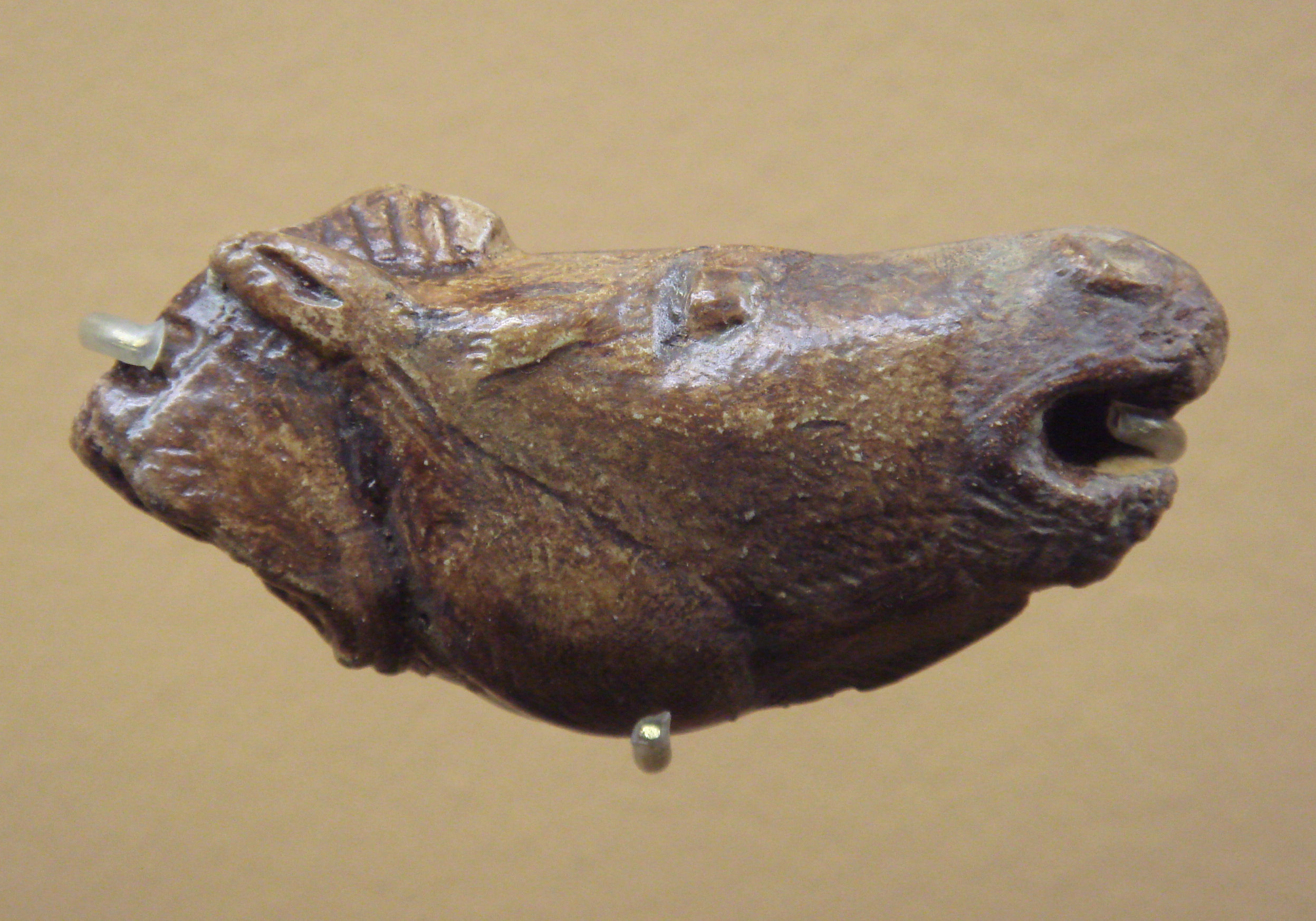

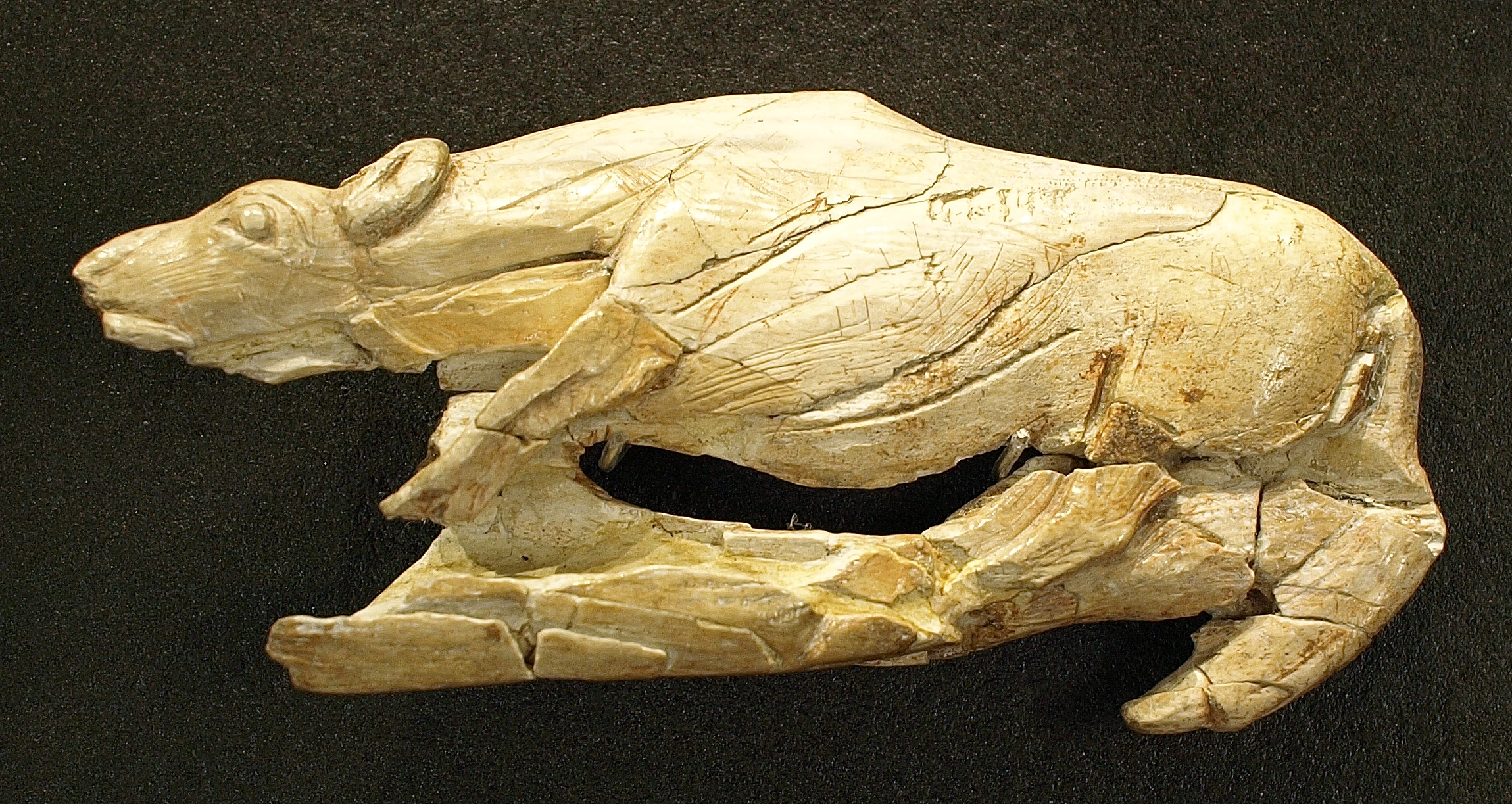

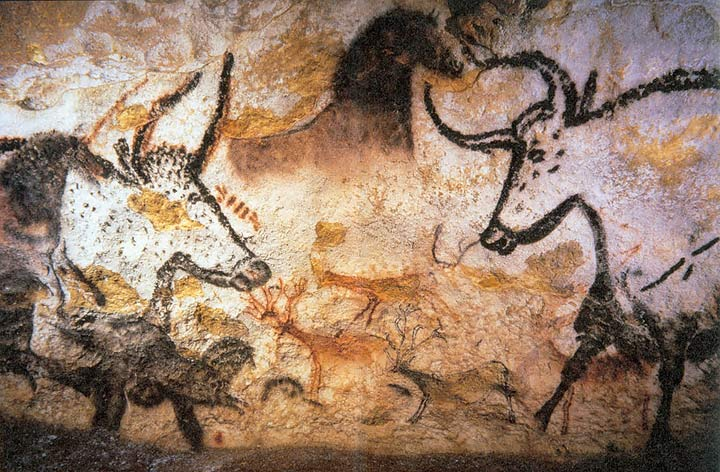
Lascaux cave painting

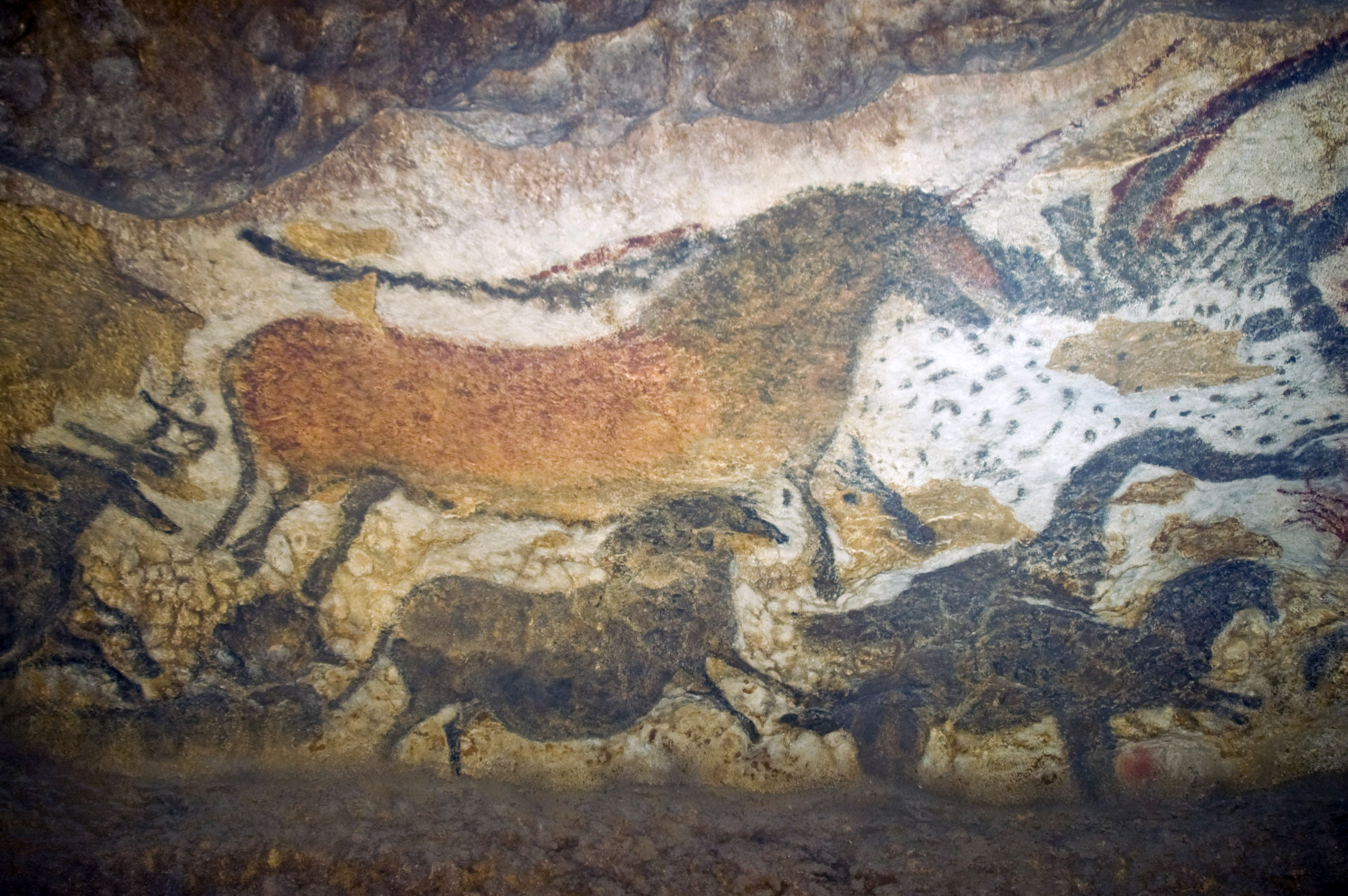
Lascaux cave painting

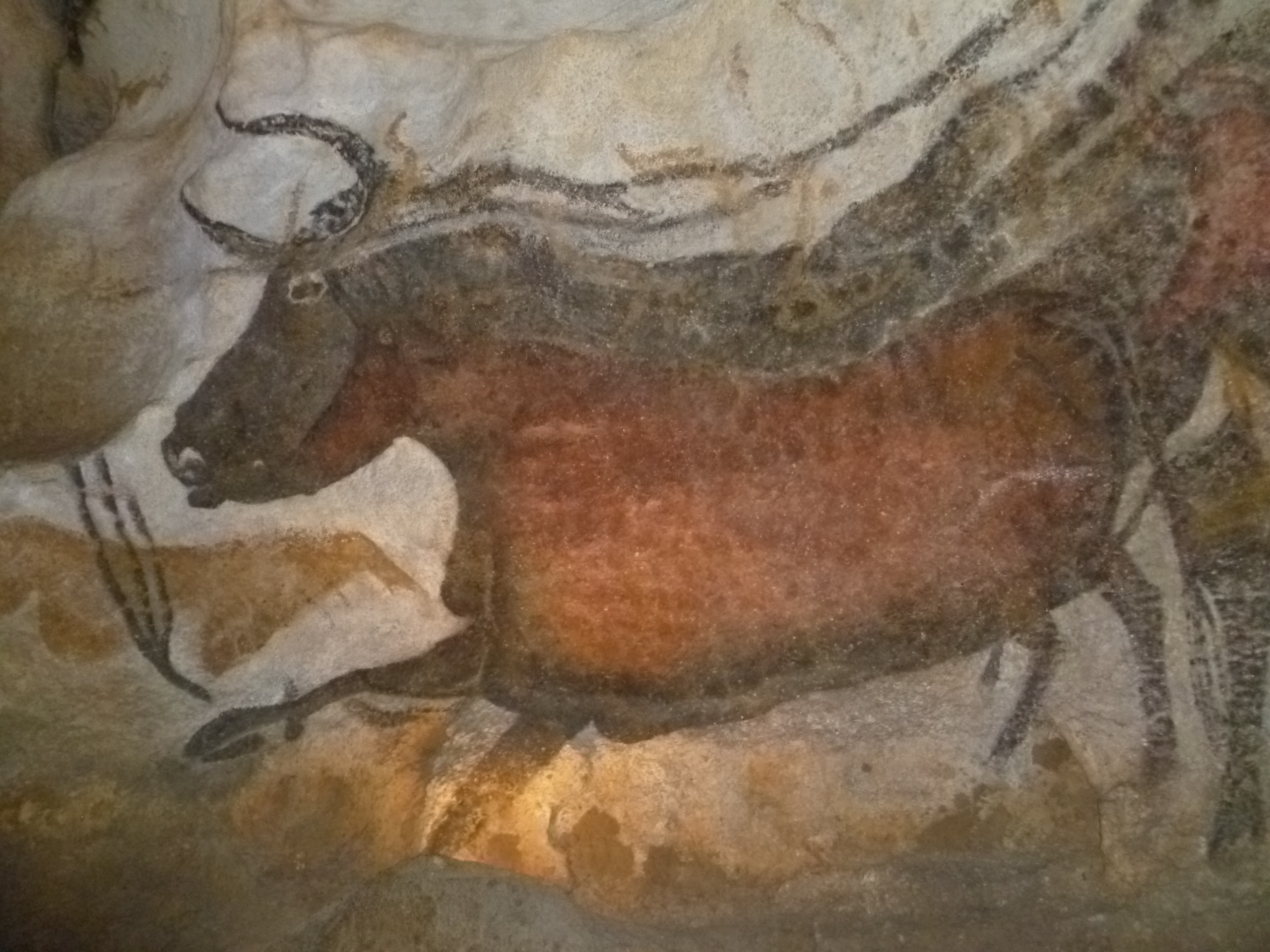

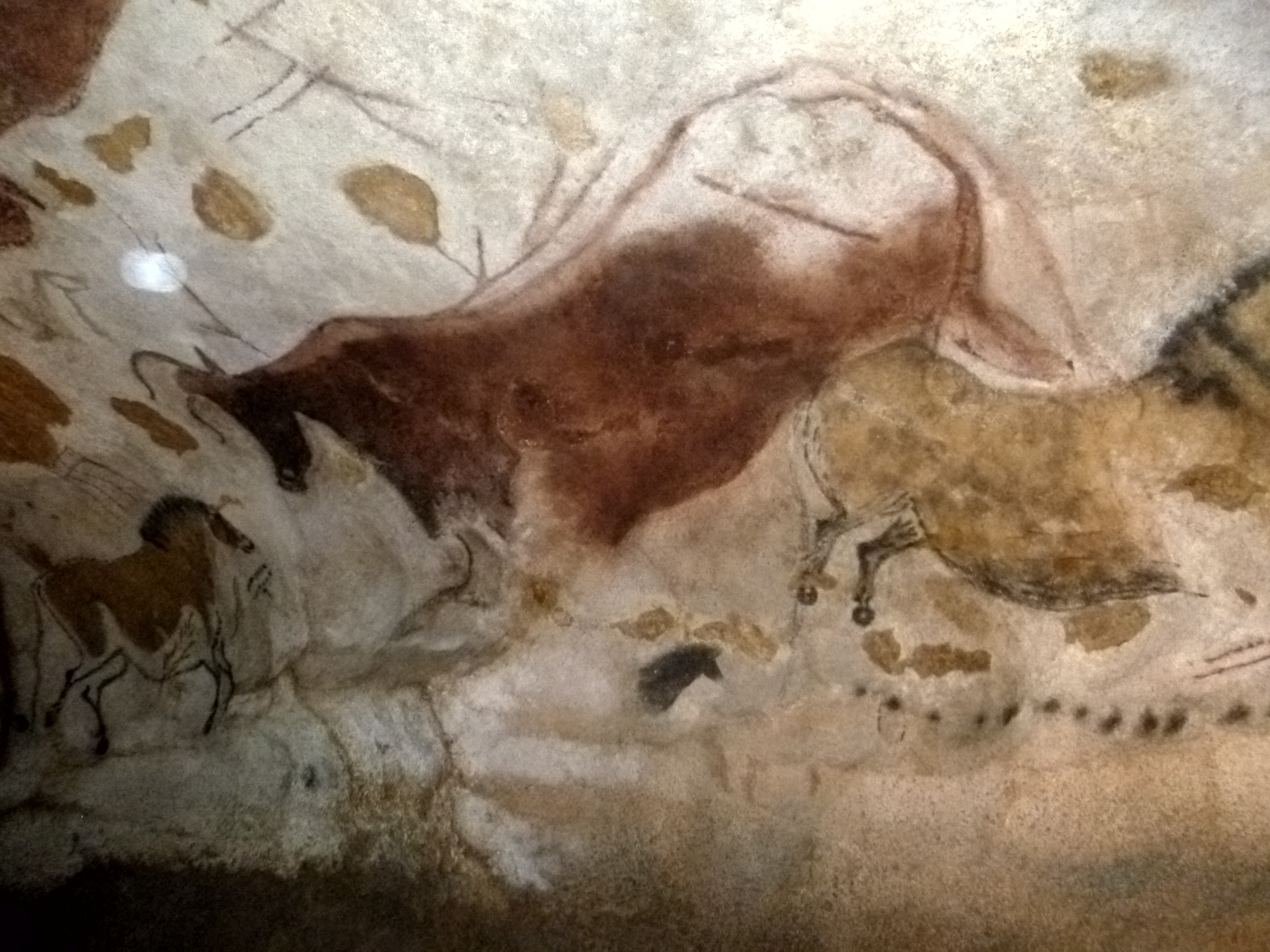

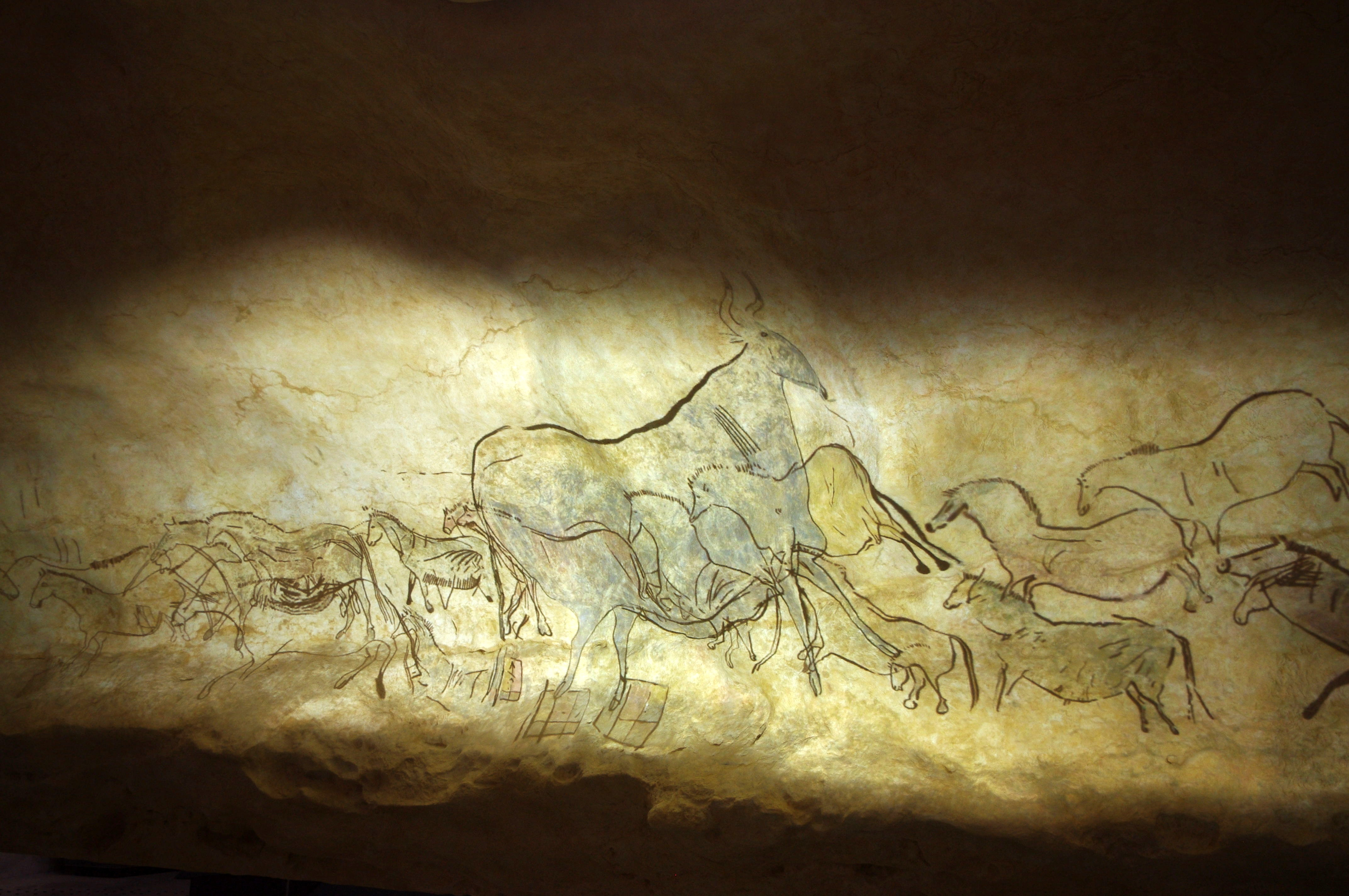

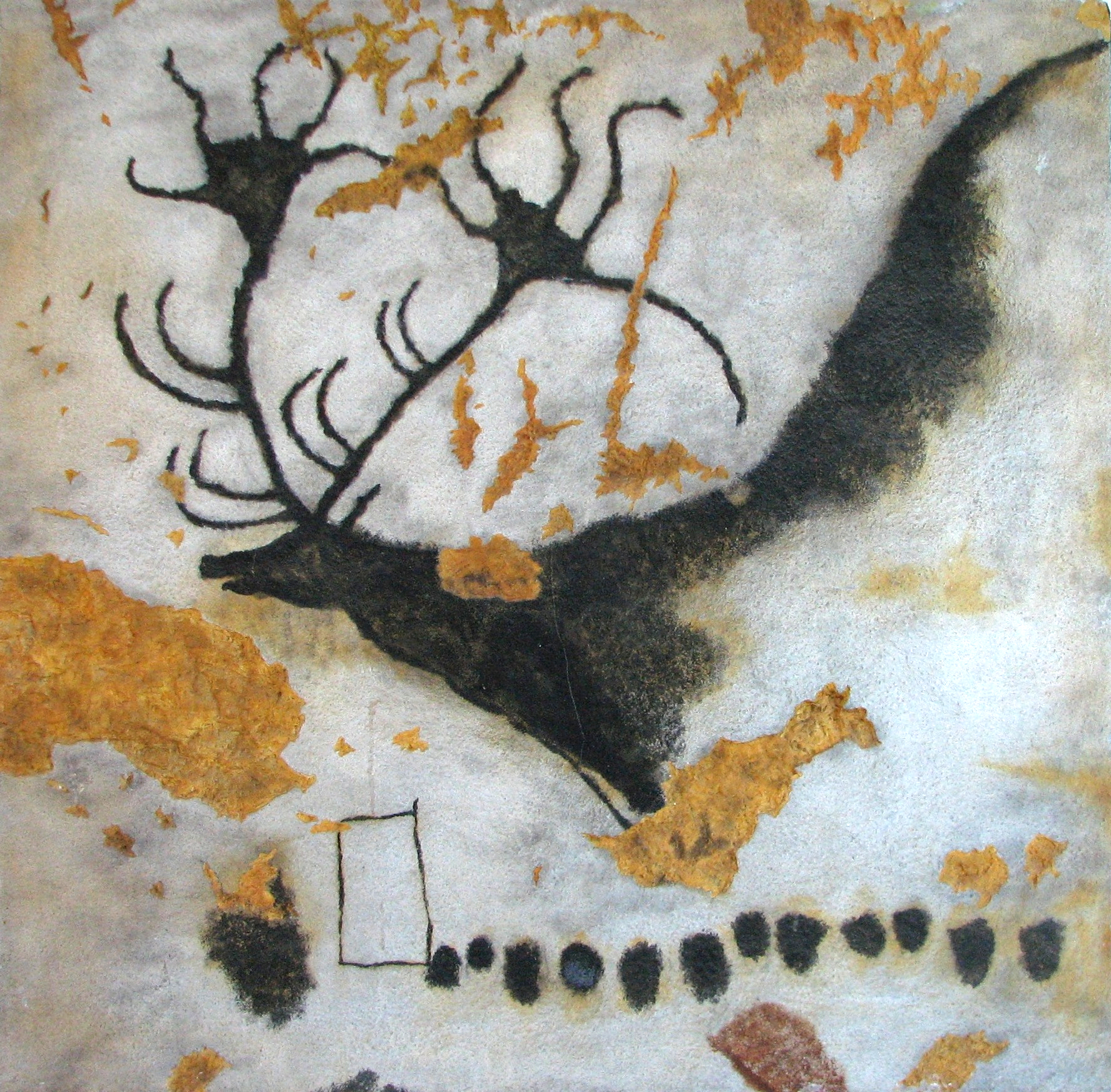

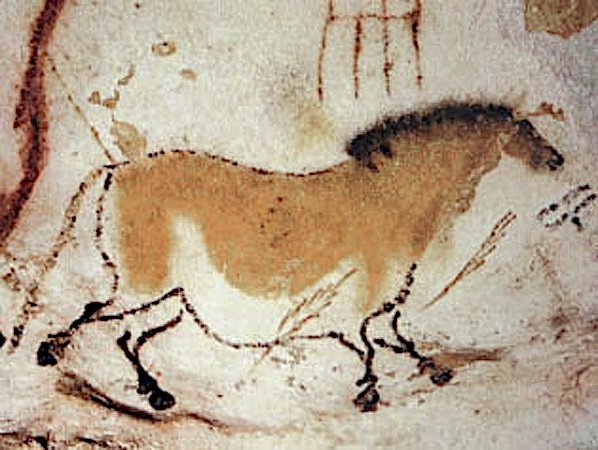

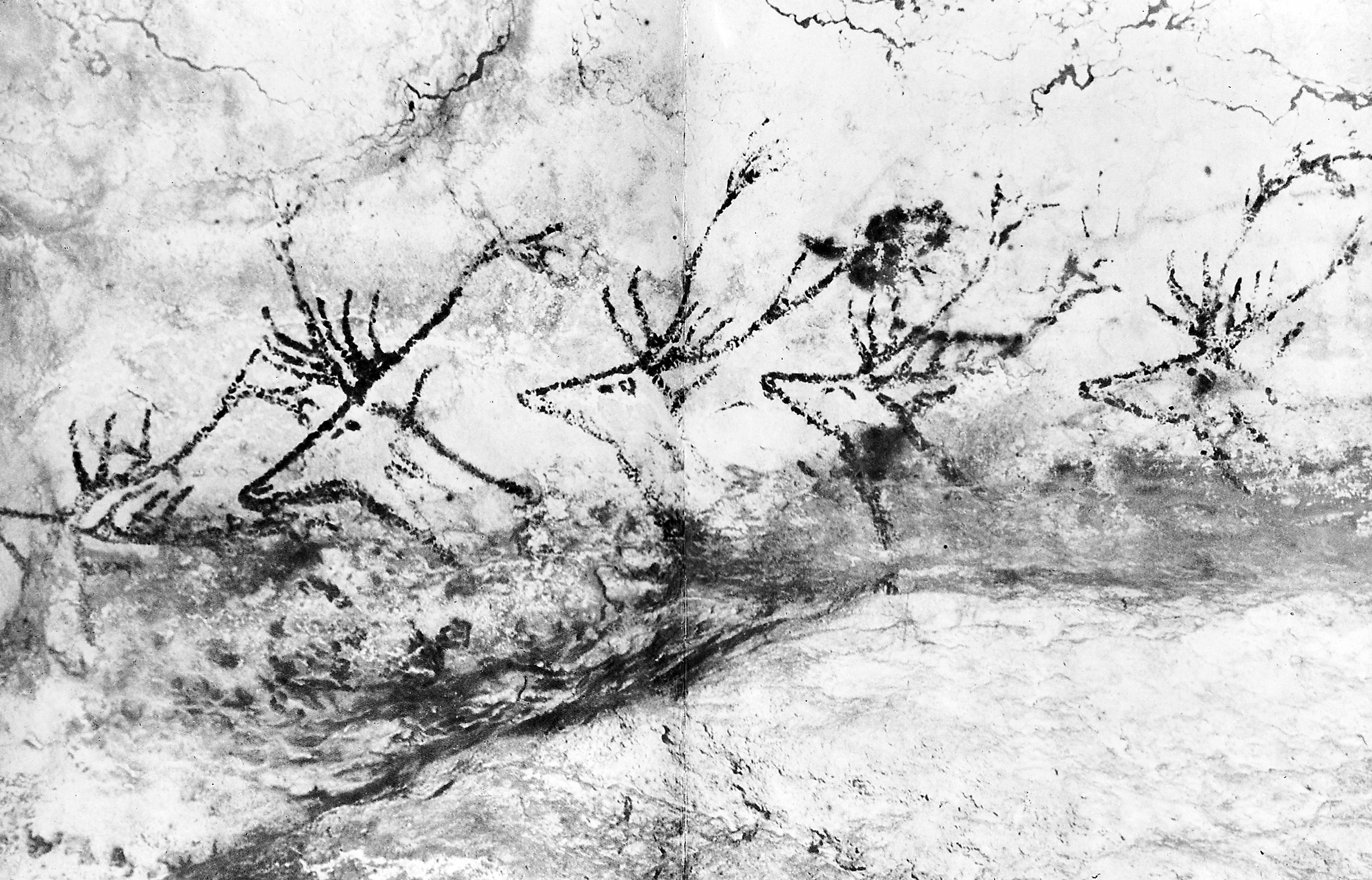

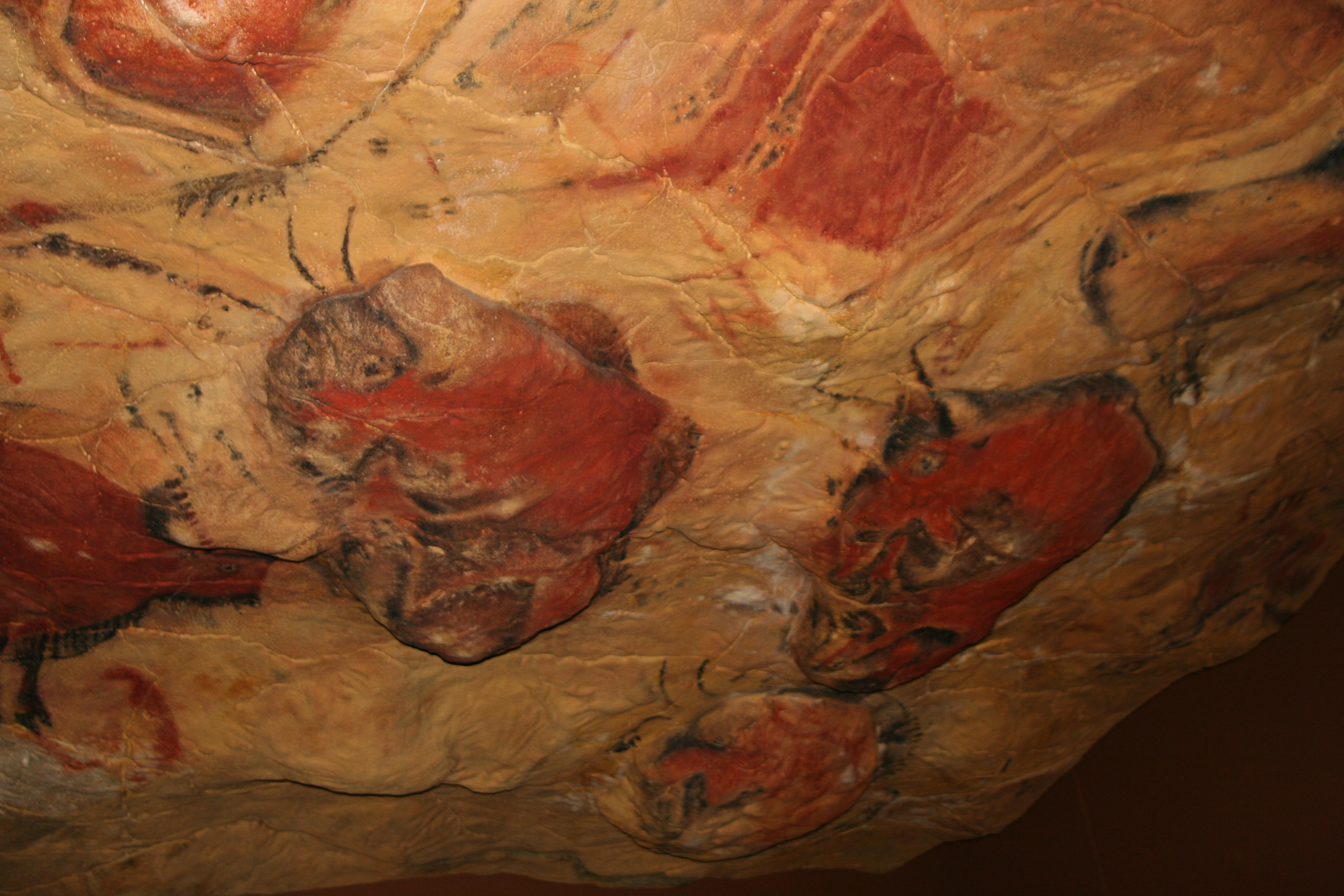
Altamira cave painting

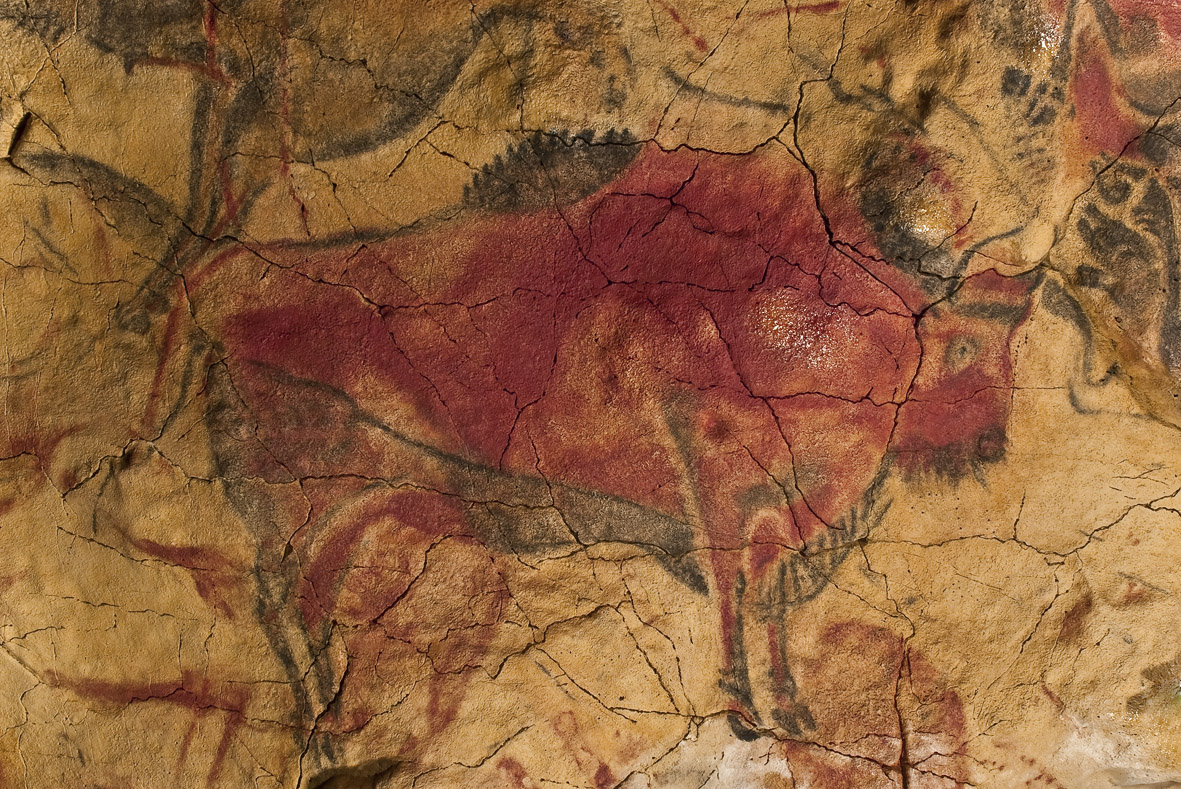

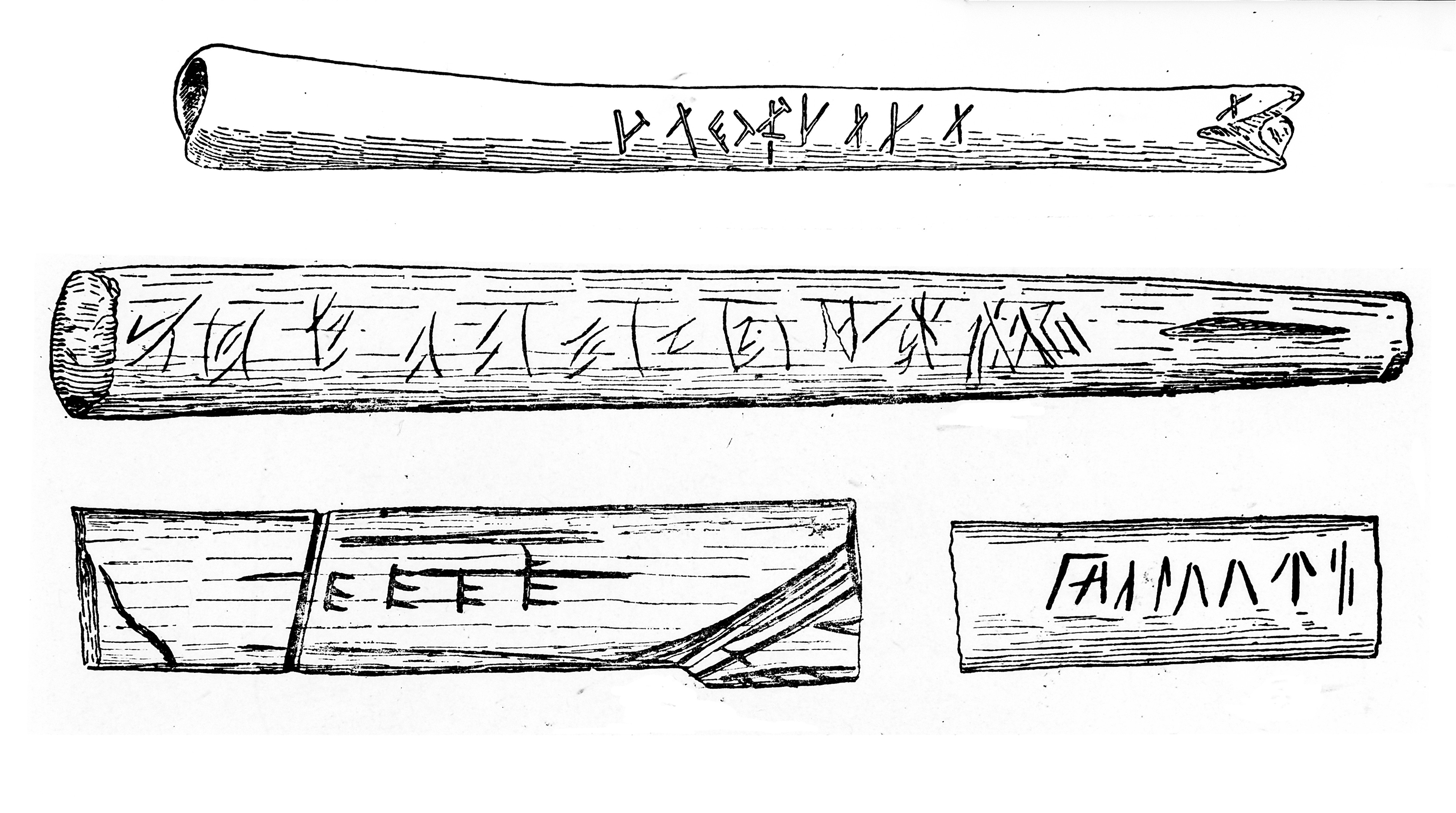

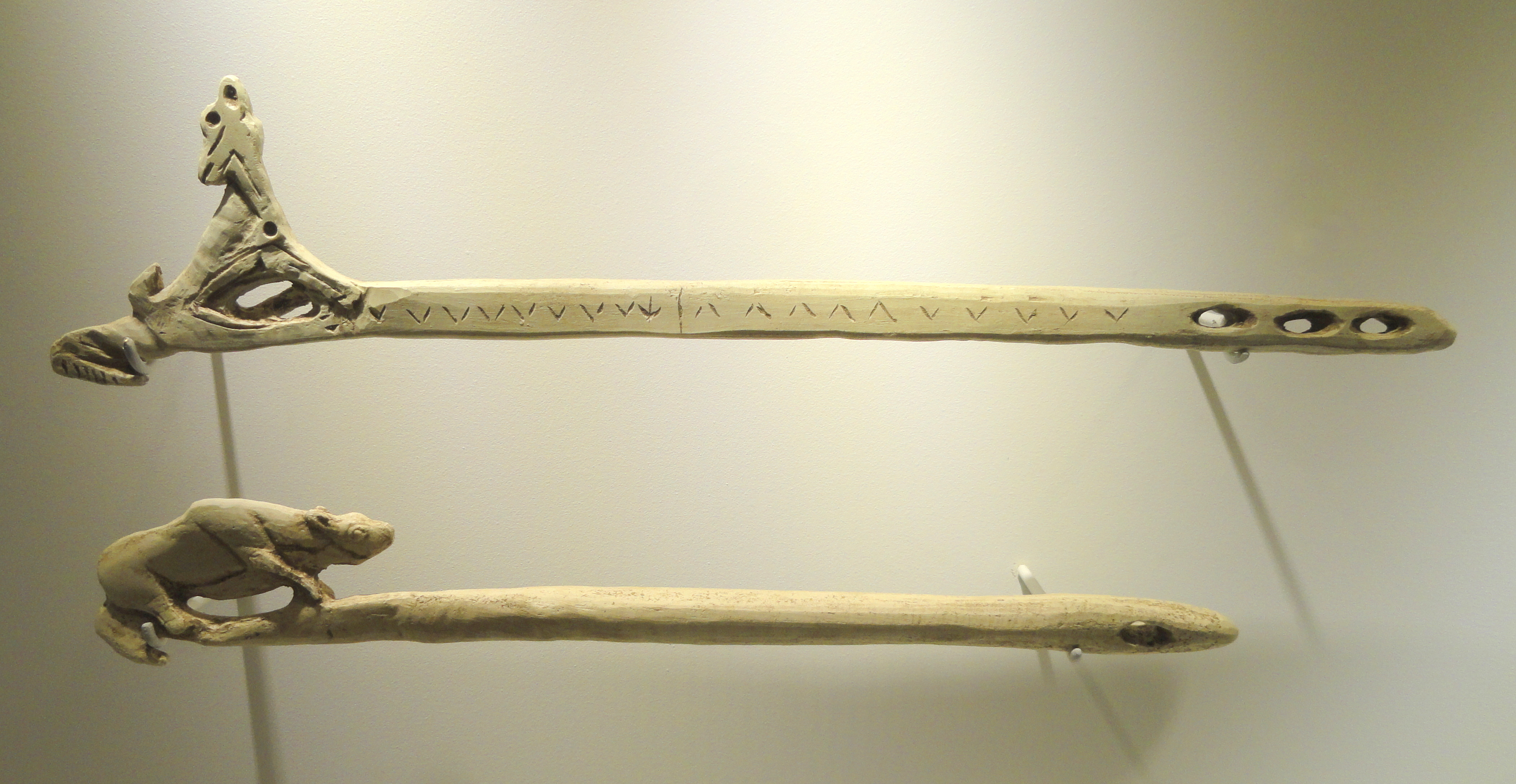

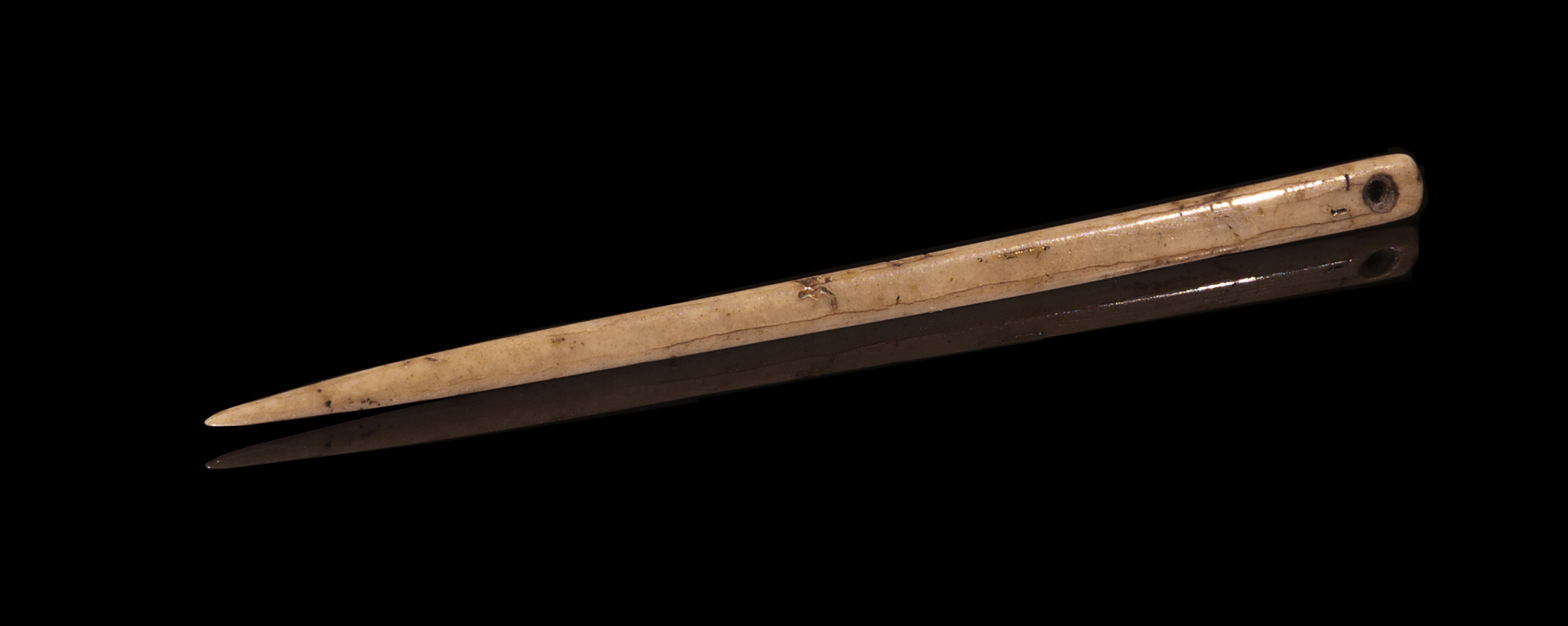

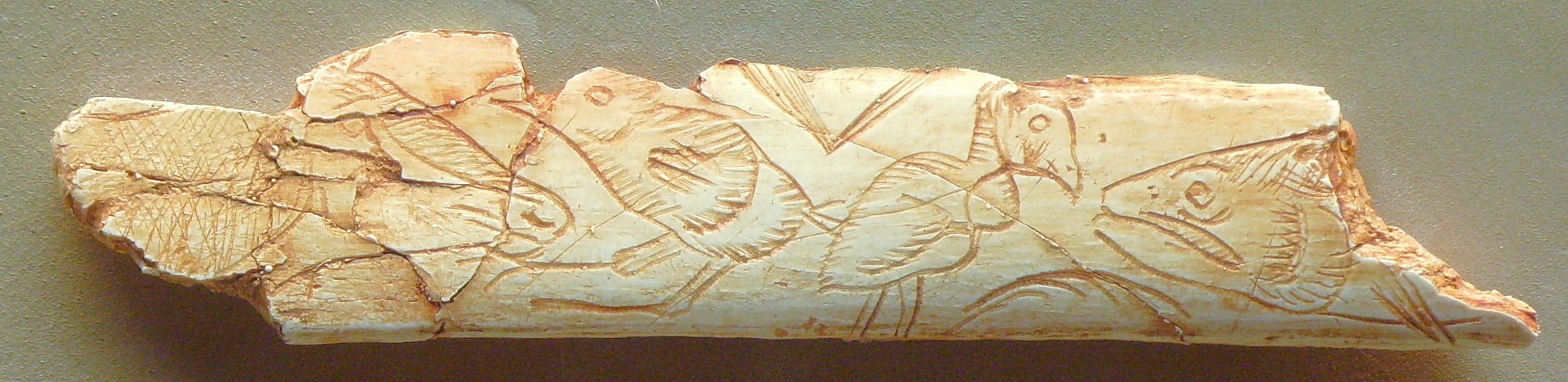

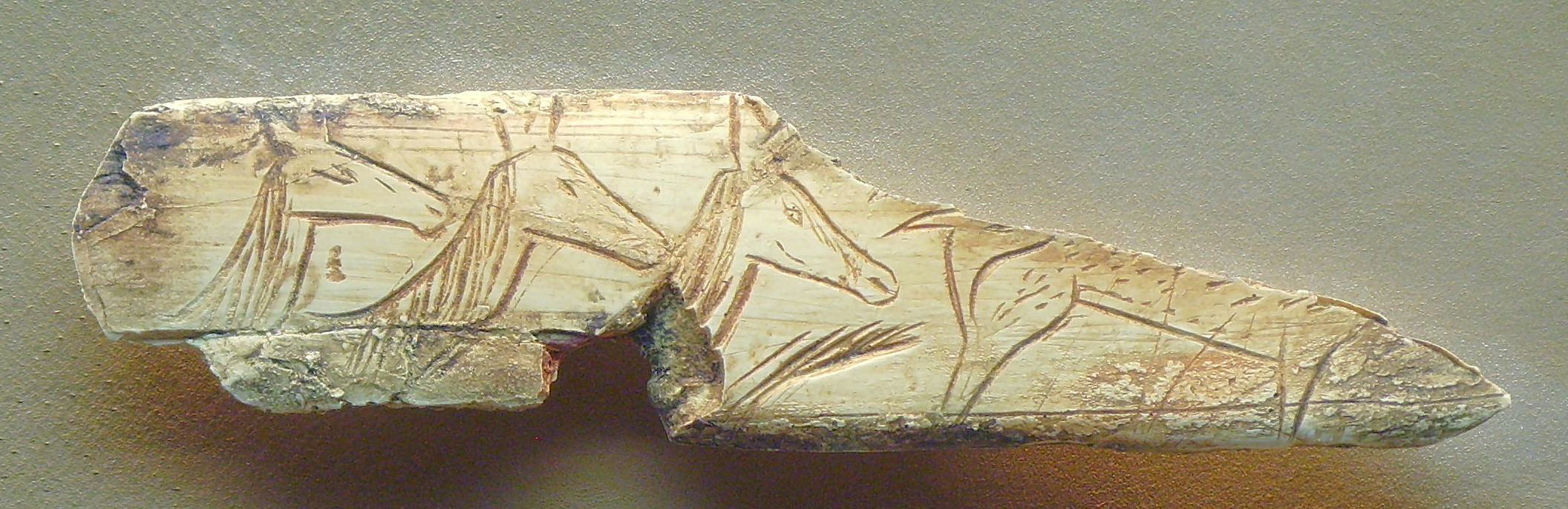

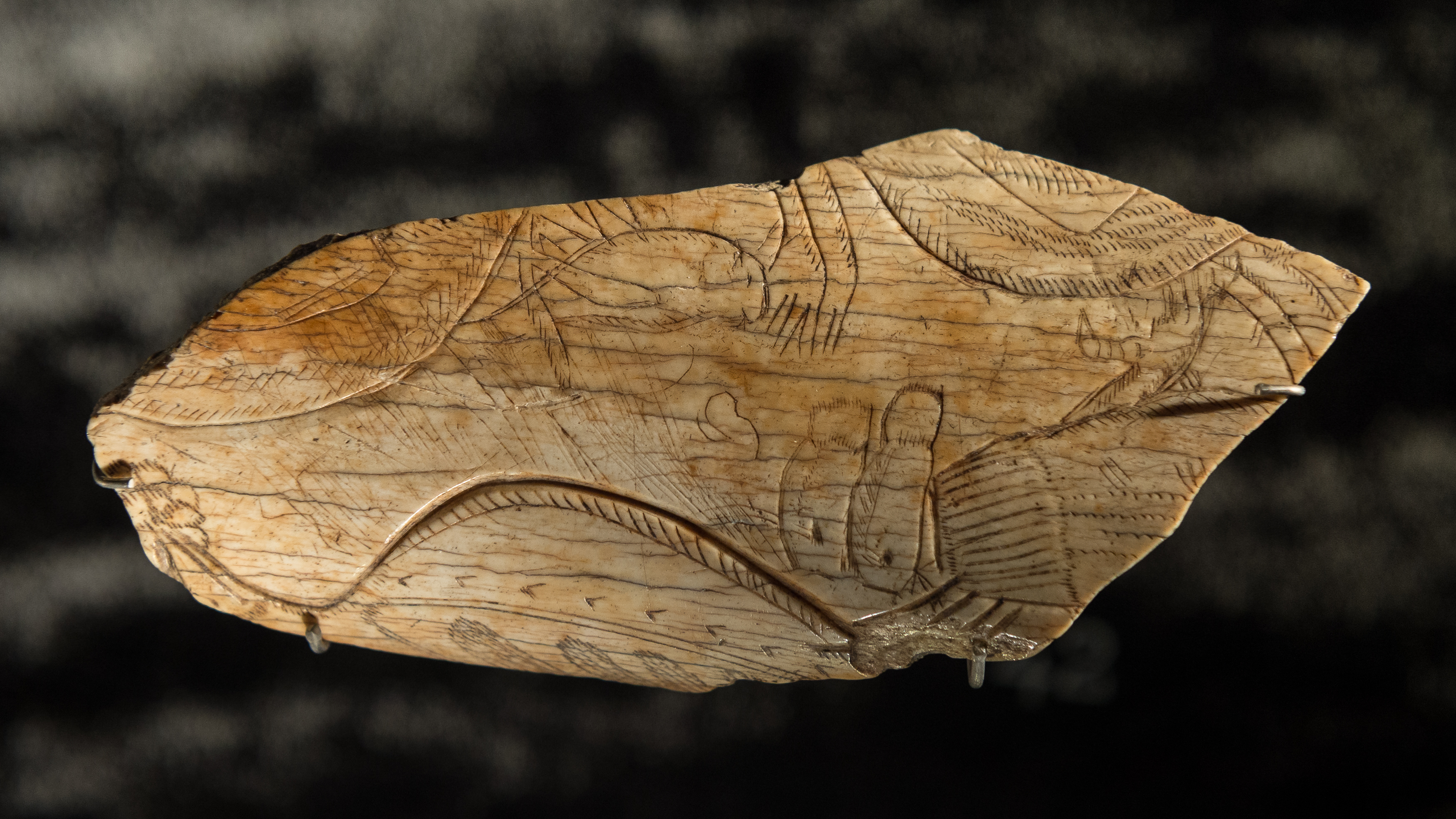

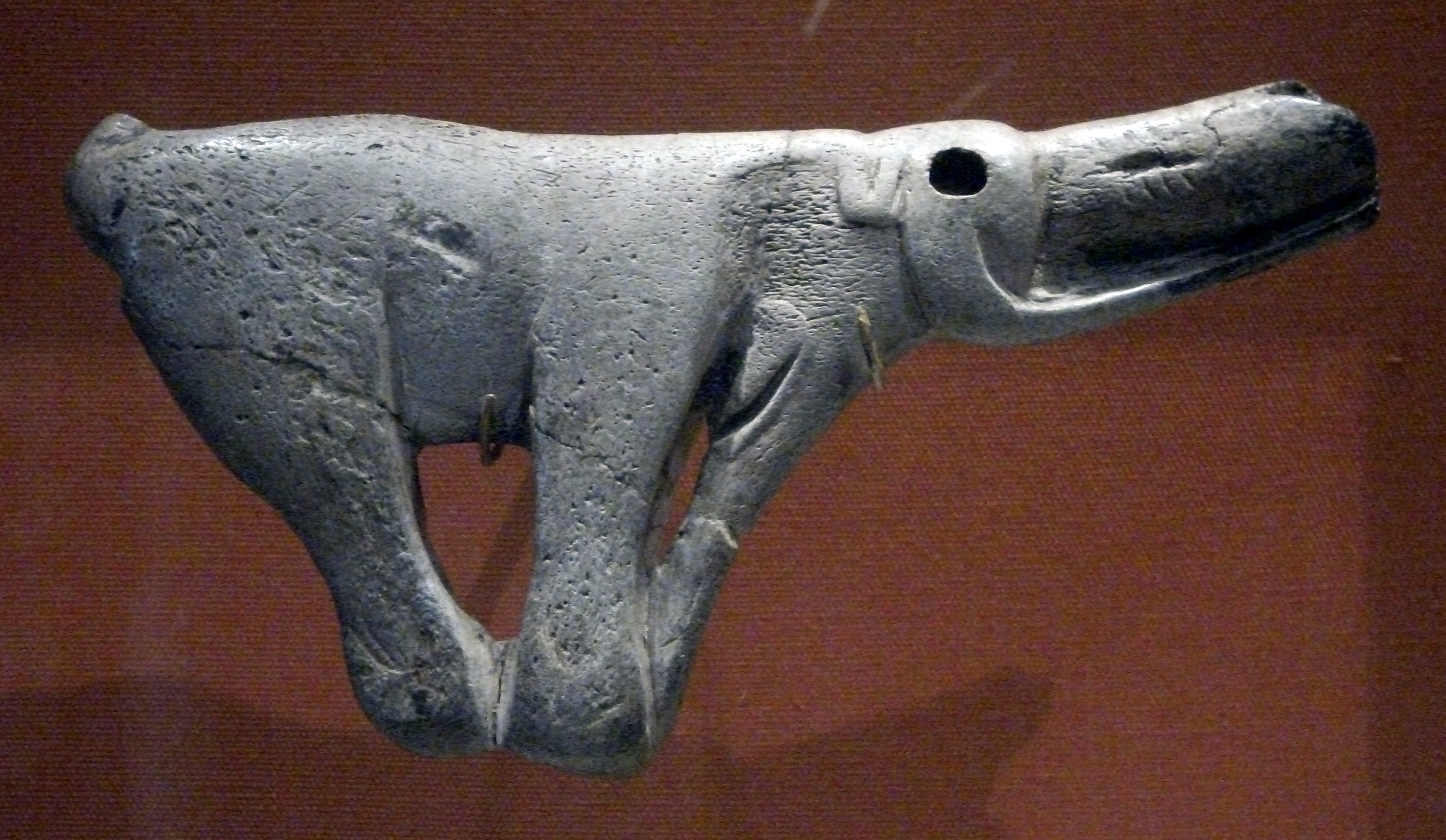

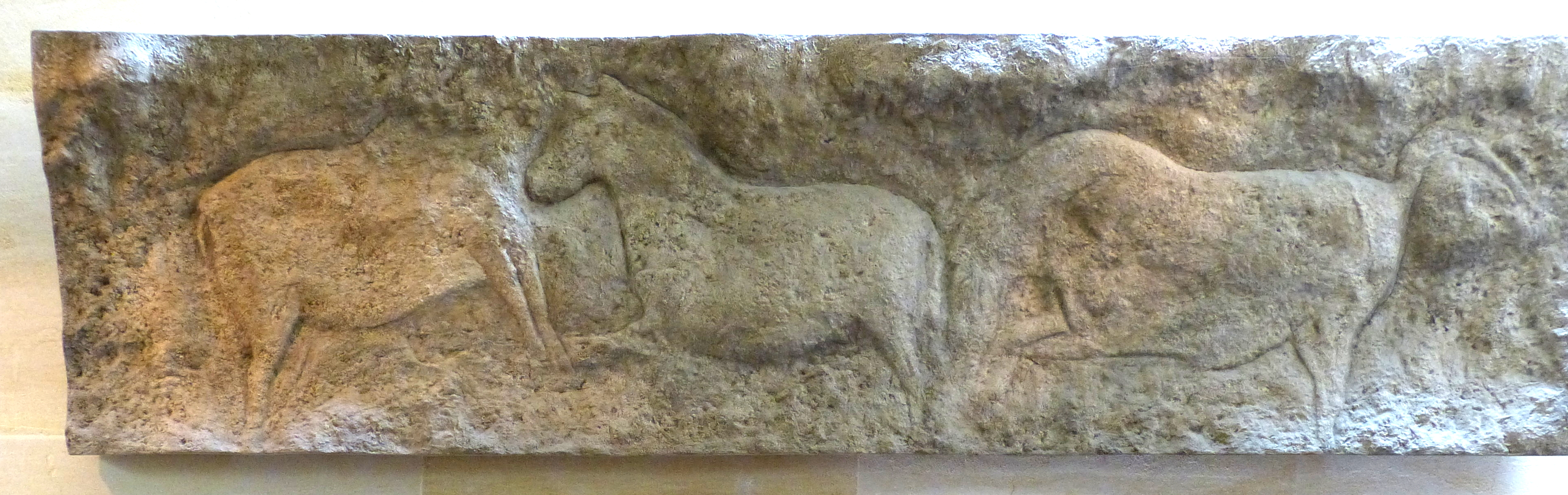

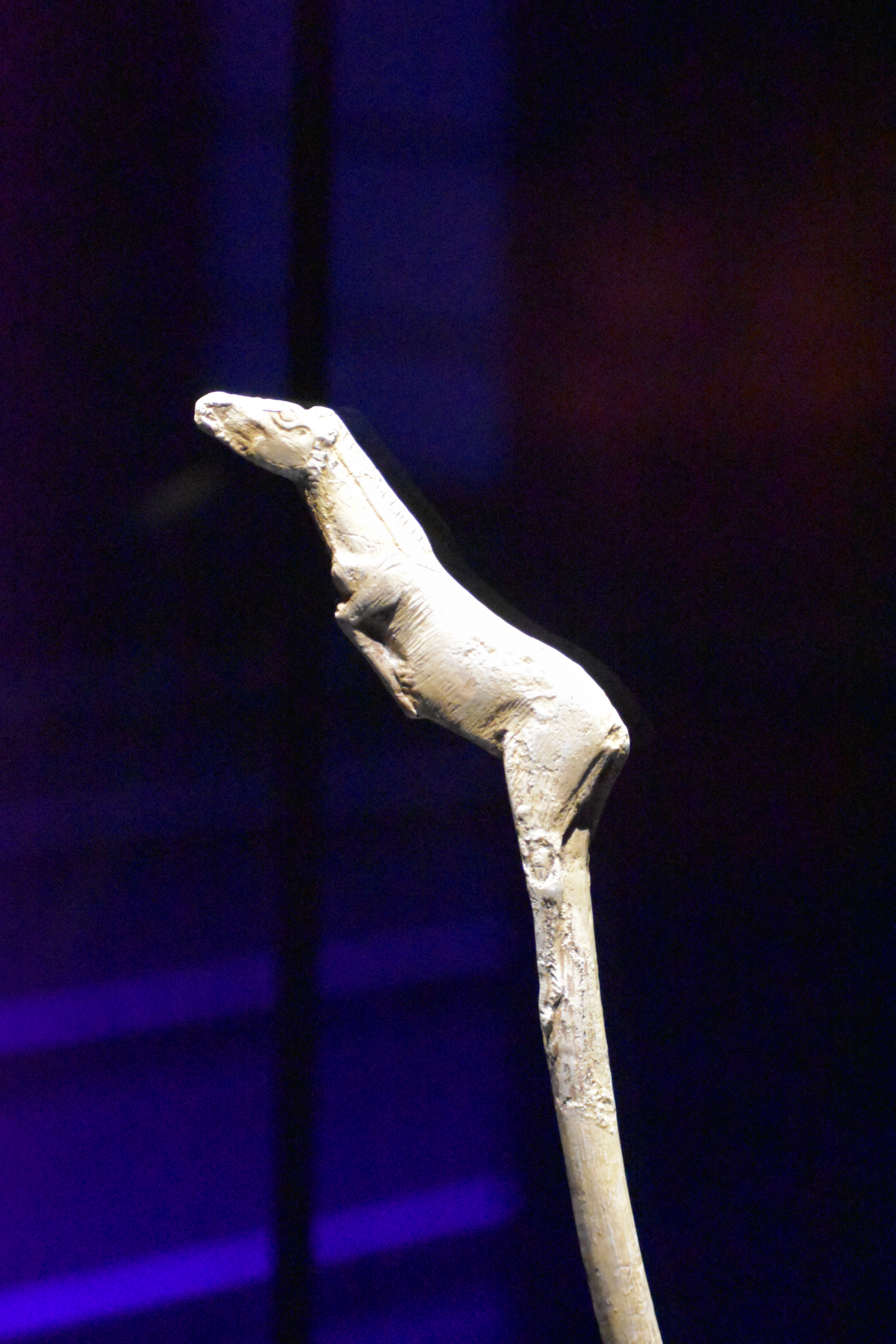

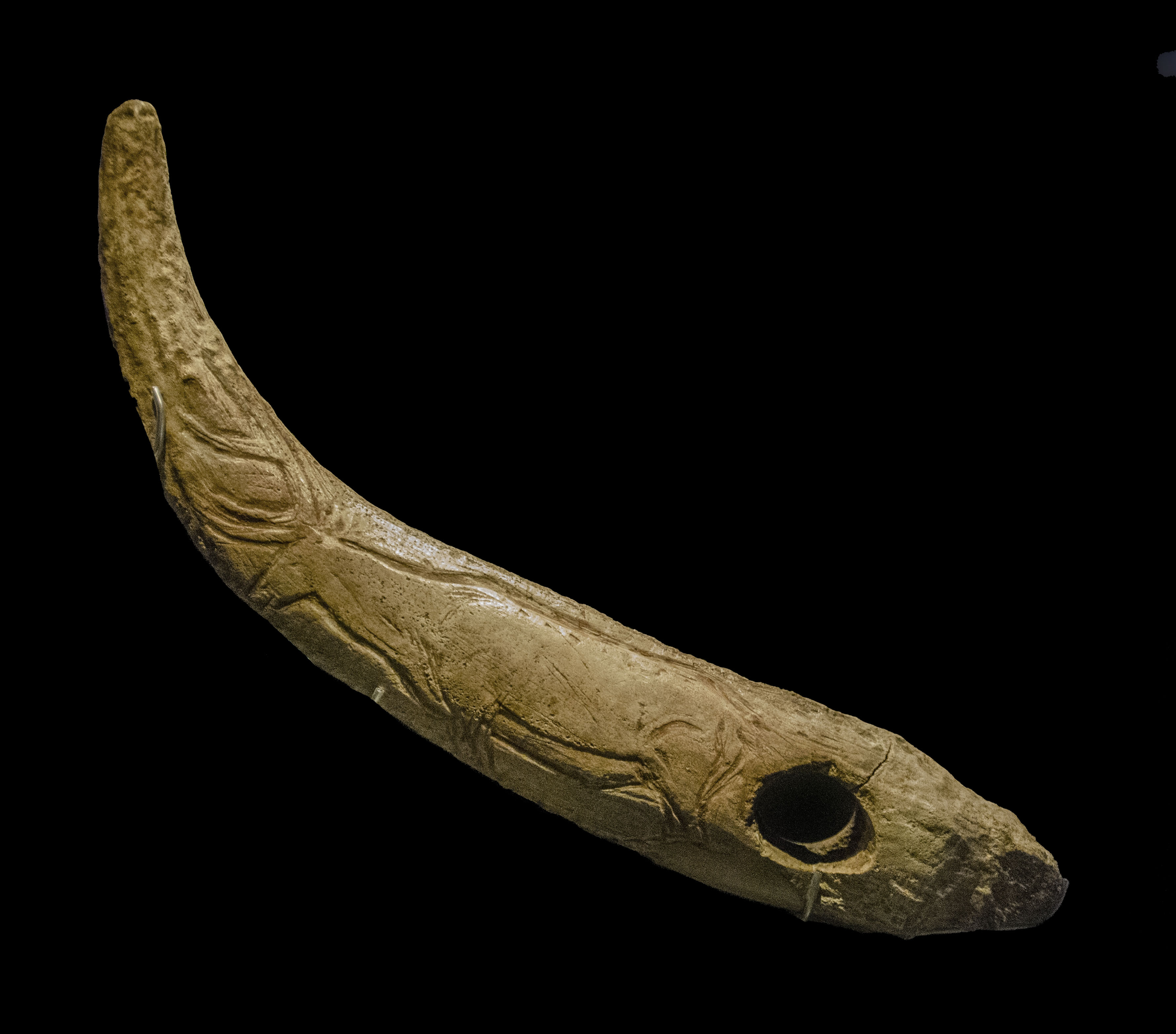

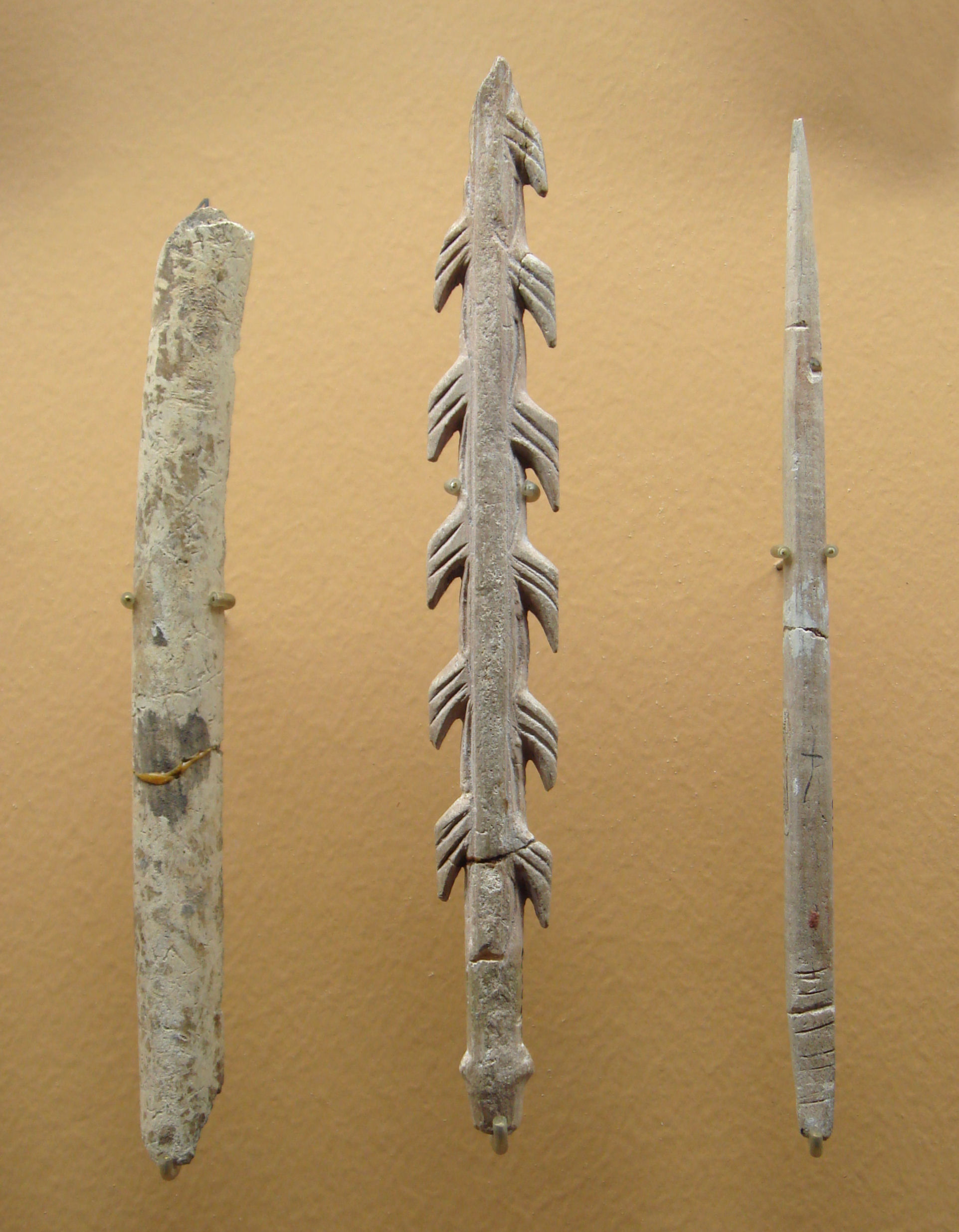

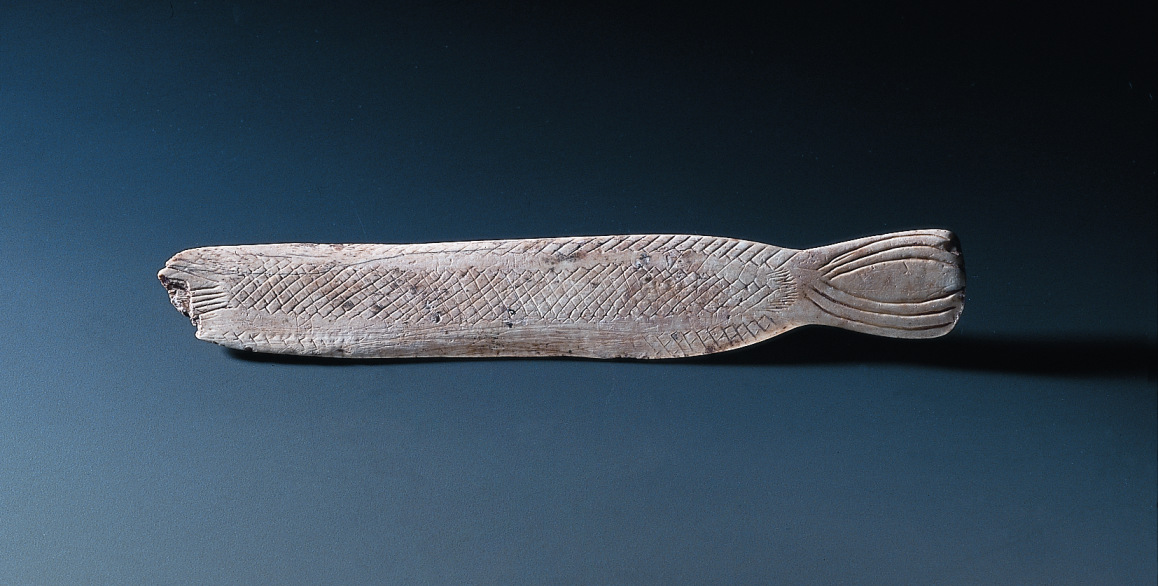

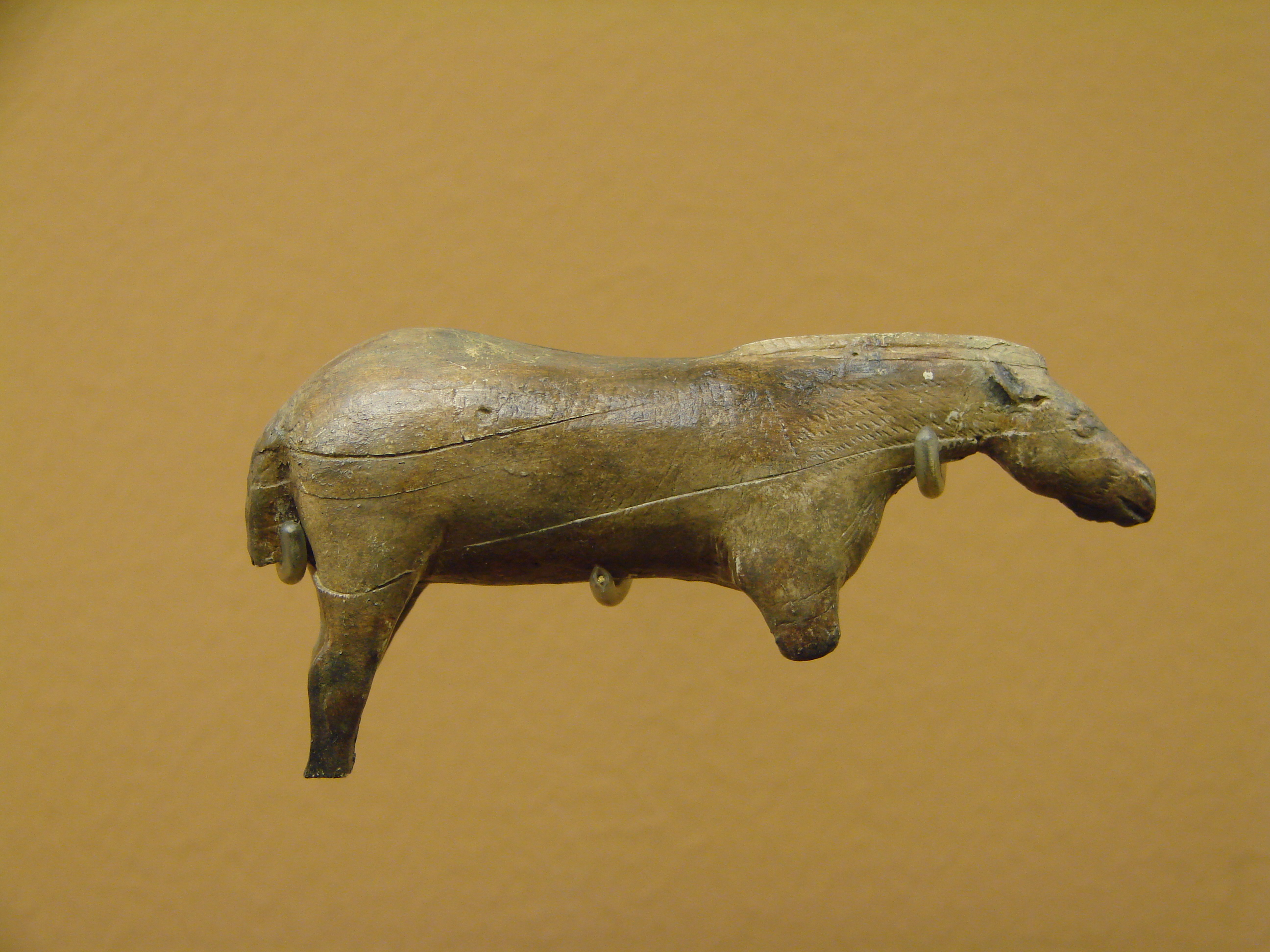

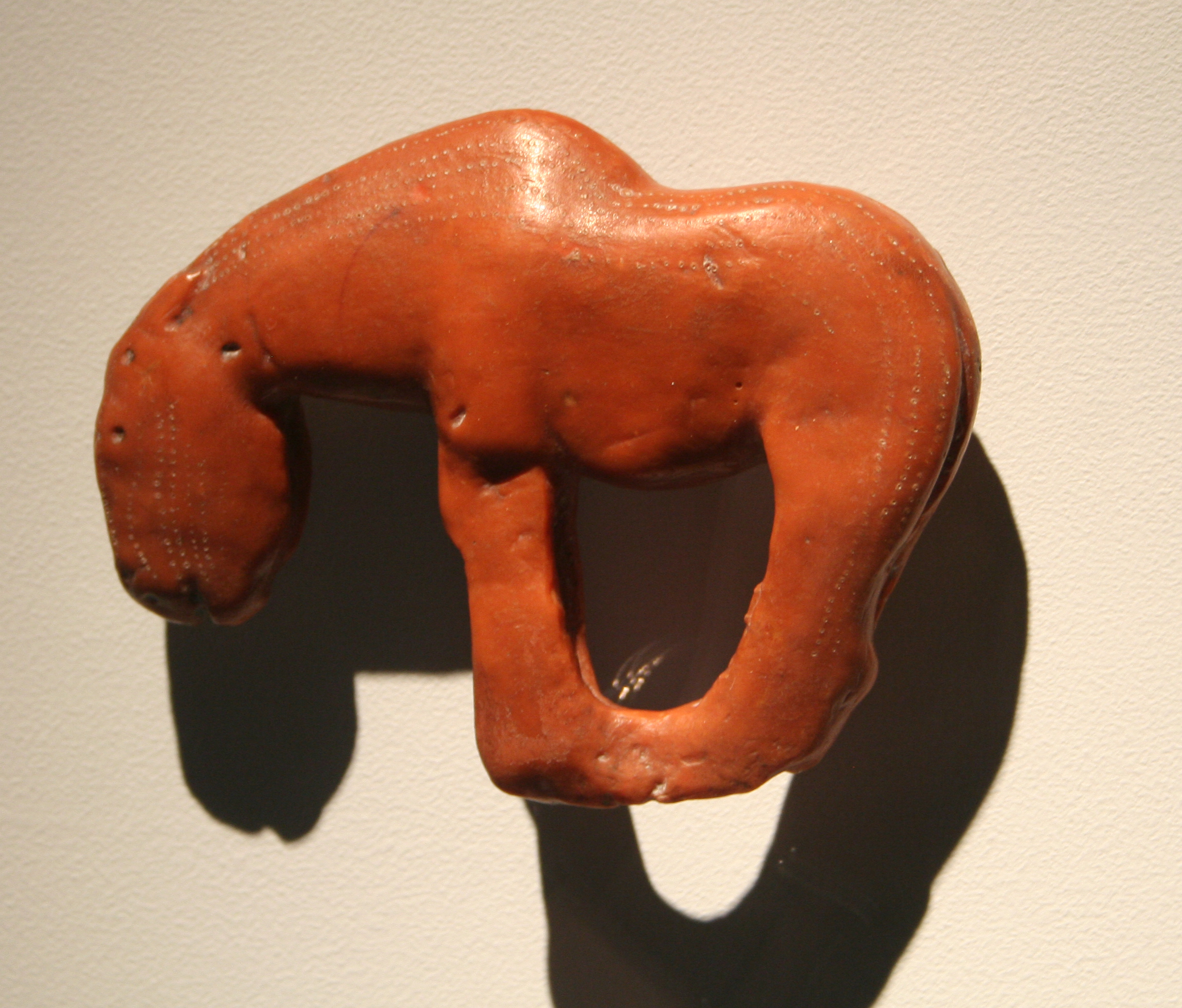

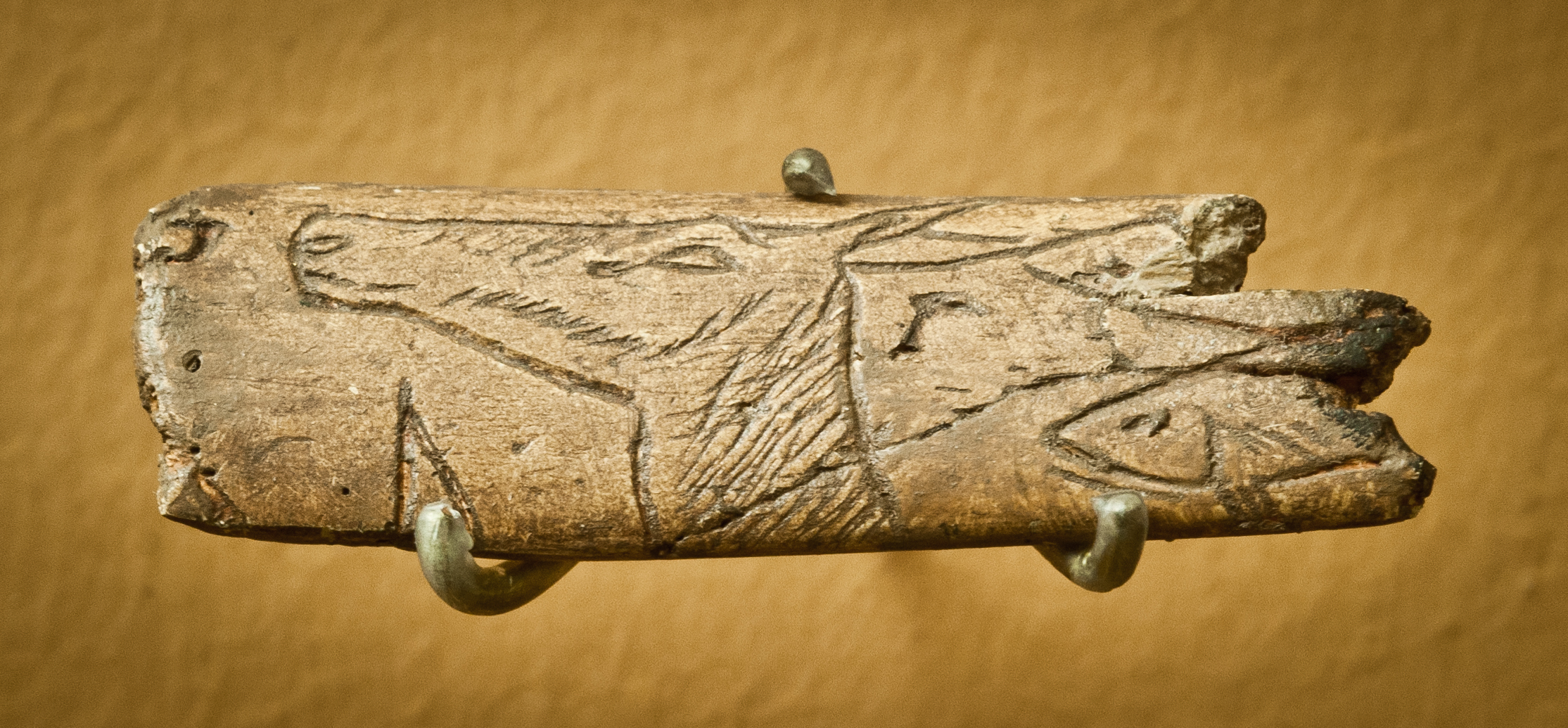

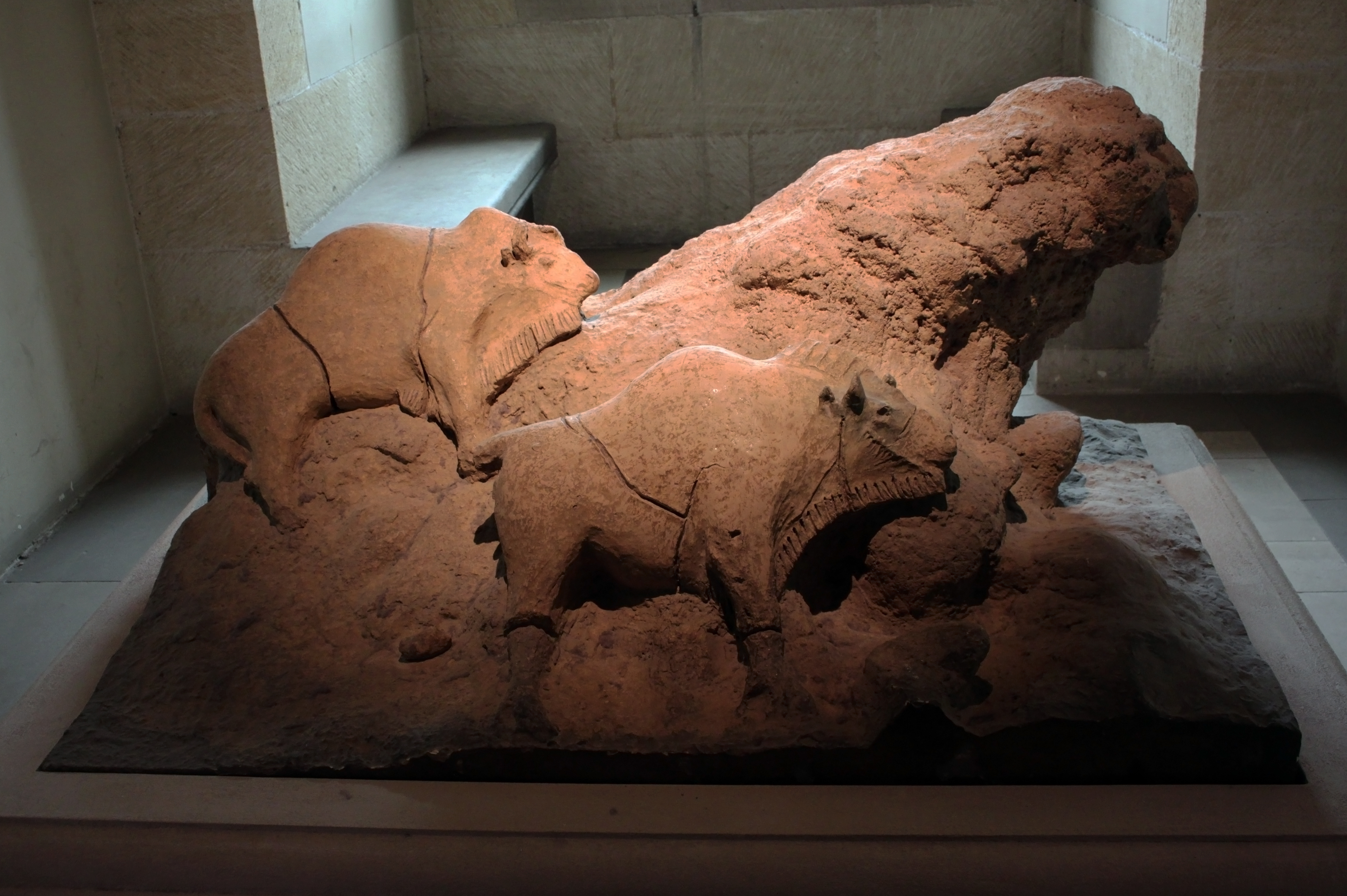

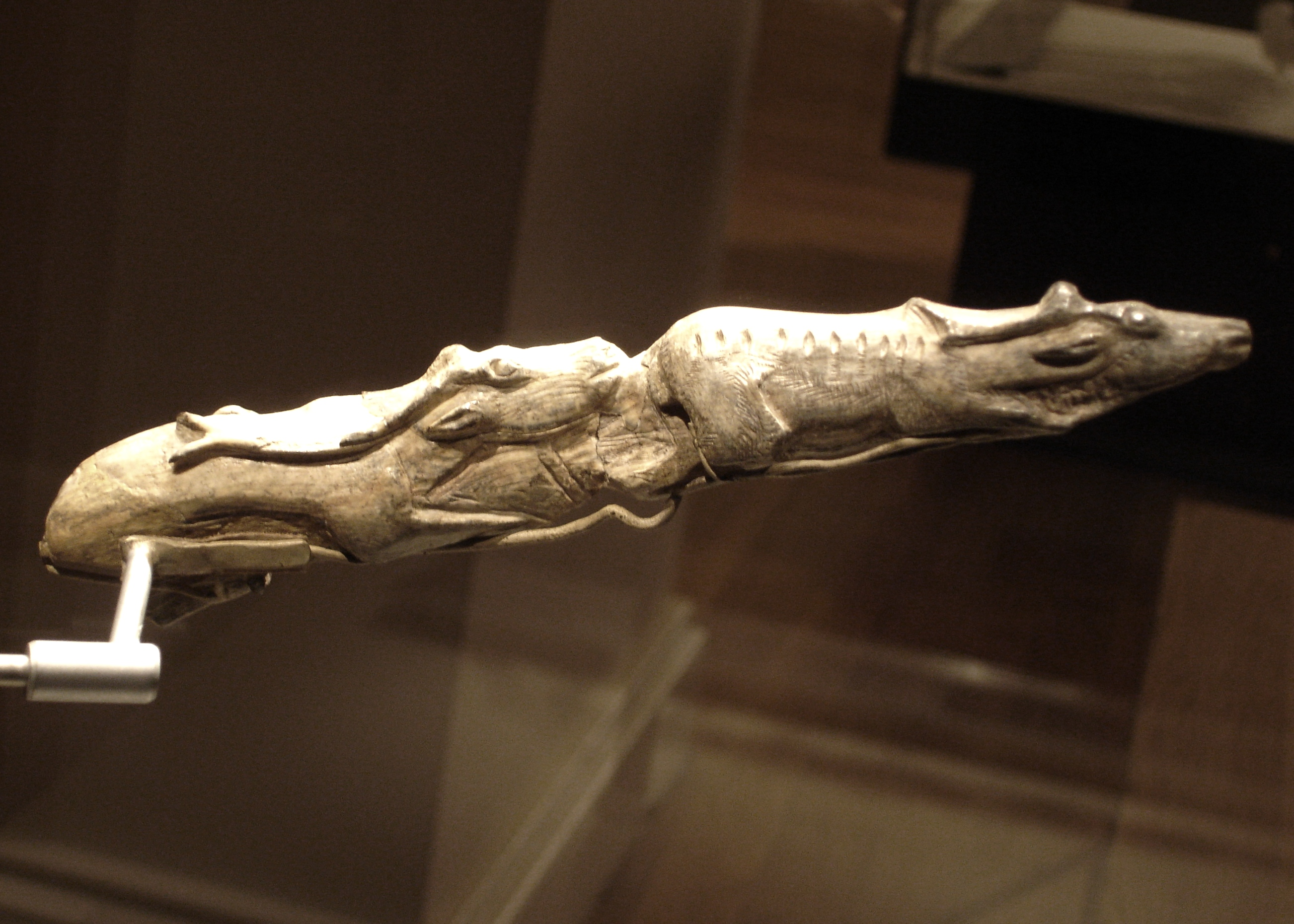

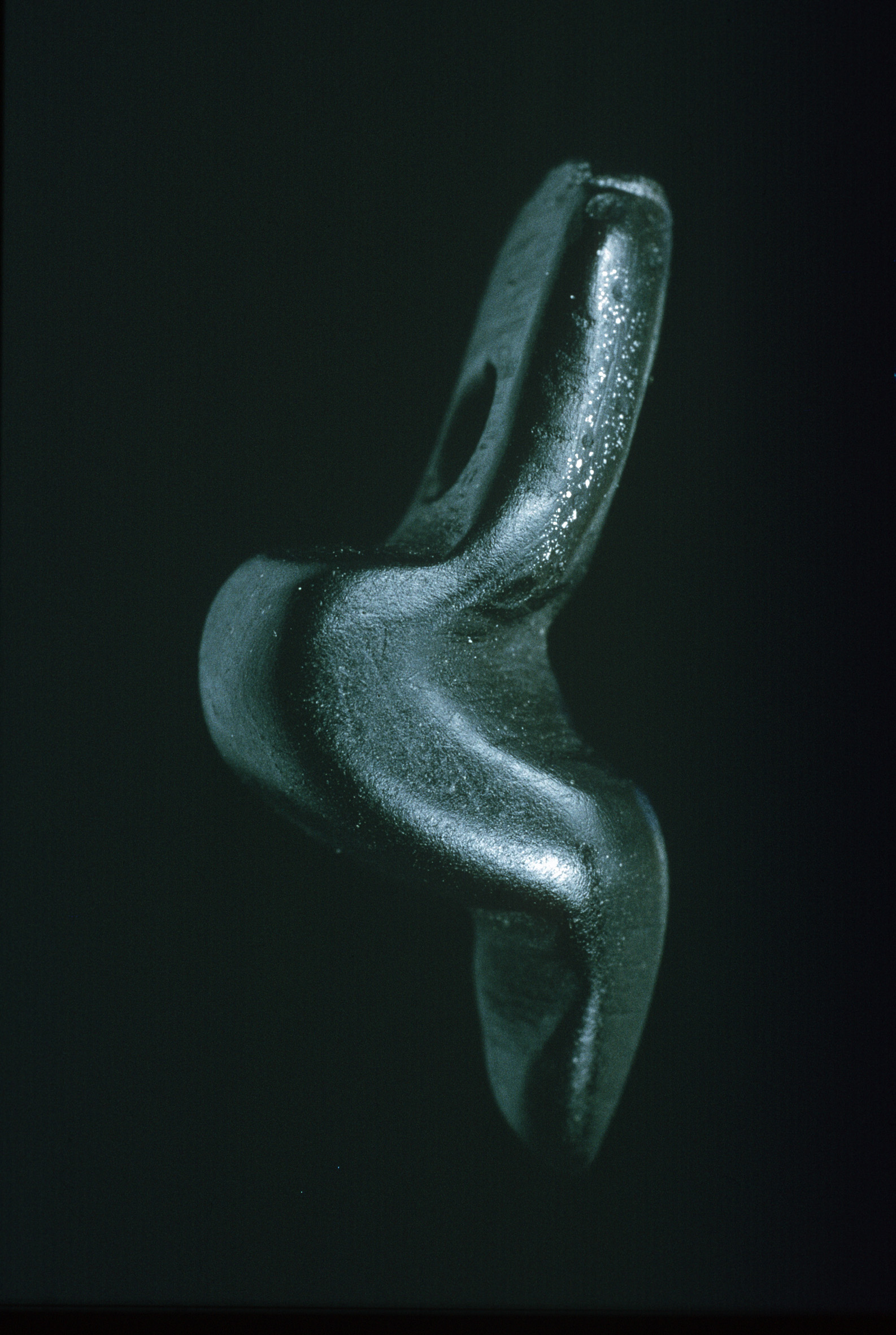

== Treatment of the dead ==
Some skulls were cleaned of soft tissues, then had the facial regions removed, with the remaining brain case retouched, possibly to make the broken edges more regular. This manipulation suggests the shaping of skulls to produce skull cups. Finds of defleshed (as evidenced by cut marks) and cracked bones with human chewing marks at Gough's Cave, England suggests that the Magdalenian peoples there engaged in cannibalism. Cannibalism has been suggested at a dozen other Magadelian sites across the culture's geographic range, representing 25% of all Magdalenian sites, far more than any other European Paleolithic culture. It has been suggested that Magdalenian peoples practiced a form of funerary endocannibalism, where upon the death of a member of the community, they were ritually dismembered and consumed by other members of the group, with their skulls being used to create skull cups. At other Magdalenian sites primary burial with no evidence of cannibalism is observed, with a handful of sites showing alternating evidence of cannibalism and primary burial at different occupation layers. At sites with primary burial, genetic analysis of these individuals indicate that they are more closely related to the people of the Epigravettian culture/Villabruna cluster than to the Magdalenians that practiced cannibalism (who belong to the GoyetQ2 cluster).

== Genetics ==
The genes of seven Magdalenians, the El Miron Cluster in Iberia, have shown close relationship to a population who had lived in Northern Europe some 20,000 years previously. The analyses suggested that 70-80% of the ancestry of these individuals was from the population represented by Goyet Q116-1, associated with the Aurignacian culture of about 35,000 BP, from the Goyet Caves in modern Belgium. It has been found that Magdalenians are closely related to Solutreans. It has also been found that Magdalenians are closely related to western Gravettians who inhabited France and Spain prior to the Last Glacial Maximum. The 15,000 year old GoyetQ2 individual from Goyet Caves is often used as a proxy for Magdalenian ancestry. Analysis of genomes of GoyetQ2-related Magdalenians suggest that like earlier Cro-Magnon groups, they probably had a relatively dark skin tone compared to modern Europeans. A 2023 study proposed that relative to earlier Western European Cro-Magnon related groups like Goyet Q116-1-related Aurignacian and the Western Gravettian associated Fournol cluster, the Goyet-Q2-related Magdalenians appear to have carried significant (~30% ancestry) from the Villabruna cluster (thought to be of southeastern European origin, and sharing affinities to West Asian peoples not found in earlier European hunter-gatherers) associated with the Epigravettian.

Four samples of Y-DNA include three samples of haplogroup I2 and one sample of C. All samples of mtDNA belonged to U, including three samples of U8a, two samples of U2'3'4'7'8'9 and one sample of U5b.

Around 14-12,000 years ago, the Western Hunter-Gatherer cluster (which predominantly descended from the Villabruna cluster, with possible ancestry related to the Goyet-Q2 cluster), expanded northwards across the Alps, largely replacing the Goyet-Q2 cluster associated Magdalenian groups in Western Europe. In France and Spain, significant GoyetQ2-related ancestry persisted into the Mesolithic and Neolithic, with some Neolithic individuals in France and Spain largely of Early European Farmer descent showing significant GoyetQ2 ancestry.

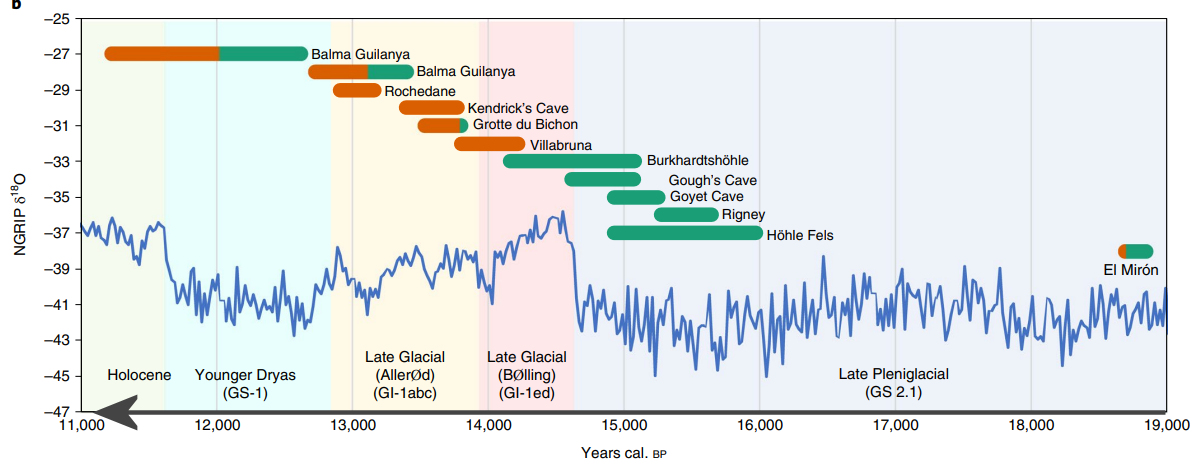
Transition from Magdalenian Goyet ancestry (green , Goyet Q2) to Western Hunter Gatherer (WHG) Villabruna ancestry (orange ) in European sites, according to timeline and climate evolution.

== See also ==
Preceded by Solutrean	Magdalenian; 17,000–9,000 BP	Succeeded by Azilian

- Prehistoric Europe
- Magdalenian Girl
- Swimming Reindeer
- Art of the Upper Paleolithic
- List of Stone Age art
- Haplogroup I-M170
- Younger Dryas
- Montgaudier Cave
