= Vézère =

River in France

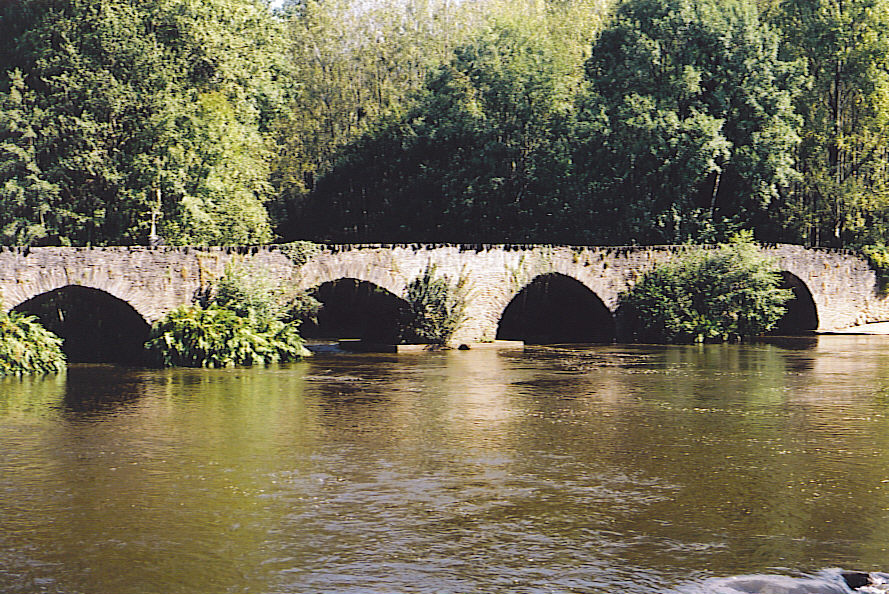
- Le Saillant, bridge over the river Vézère

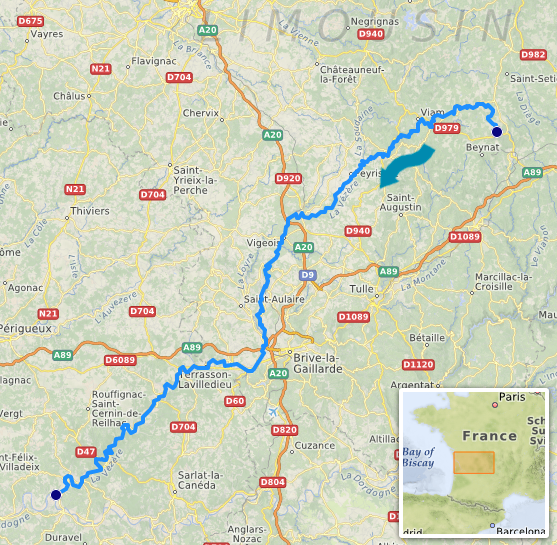

Location
- Country: France

Physical characteristics
- Source
  - location: Plateau de Millevaches
  - elevation: 970 m (3,180 ft)
- Mouth
  - location: Dordogne
  - coordinates: 44°52′53″N 0°53′26″E
- Length: 211 km (131 mi)
- Basin size: 3,708 km^{2} (1,432 sq mi)
- Discharge
  - average: 50 m^{3}/s (1,800 cu ft/s)

Basin features
- Progression: Dordogne→ Gironde estuary→ Atlantic Ocean

Prehistoric Sites and Decorated Caves of the Vézère Valley
UNESCO World Heritage Site
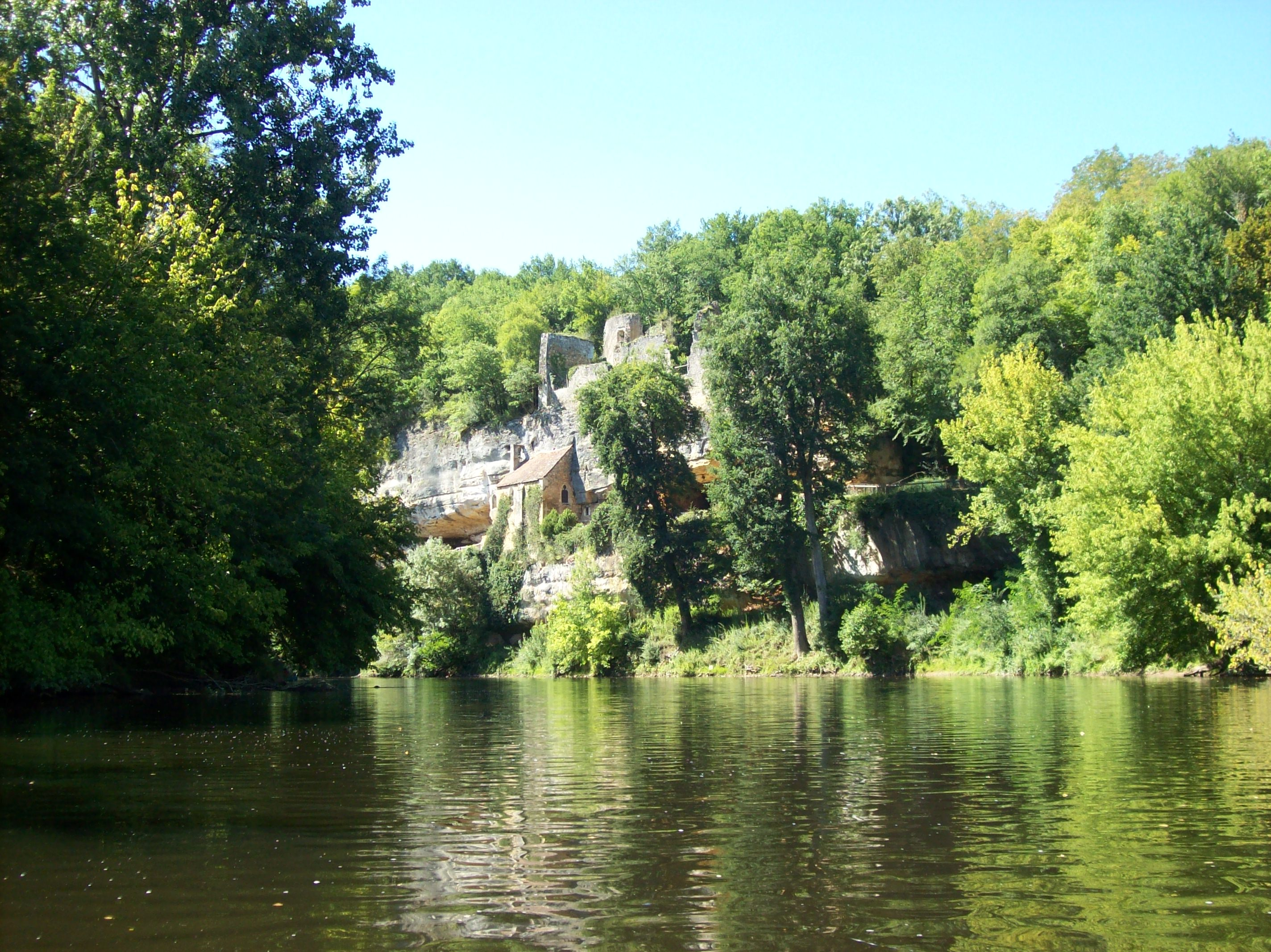
- Vézère at La Madeleine site
- Interactive map of Prehistoric Sites and Decorated Caves of the Vézère Valley
- Includes: 1. Abri de Cro-Magnon; 2. Abri du Poisson; 3. Font de Gaume; 4. La Micoque; 5. La Mouthe; 6. Laugerie basse 7. Laugerie haute 8. Le Grand Roc; 9. Les Combarelles; 10. Le Cap Blanc; 11. Lascaux; 12. Cro de Granville (cro de Rouffignac); 13. Roc de Saint-Cirq; 14. Le Moustier; 15. La Madeleine
- Criteria: Cultural: (i)(iii)
- Reference: 85
- Inscription: 1979 (3rd Session)

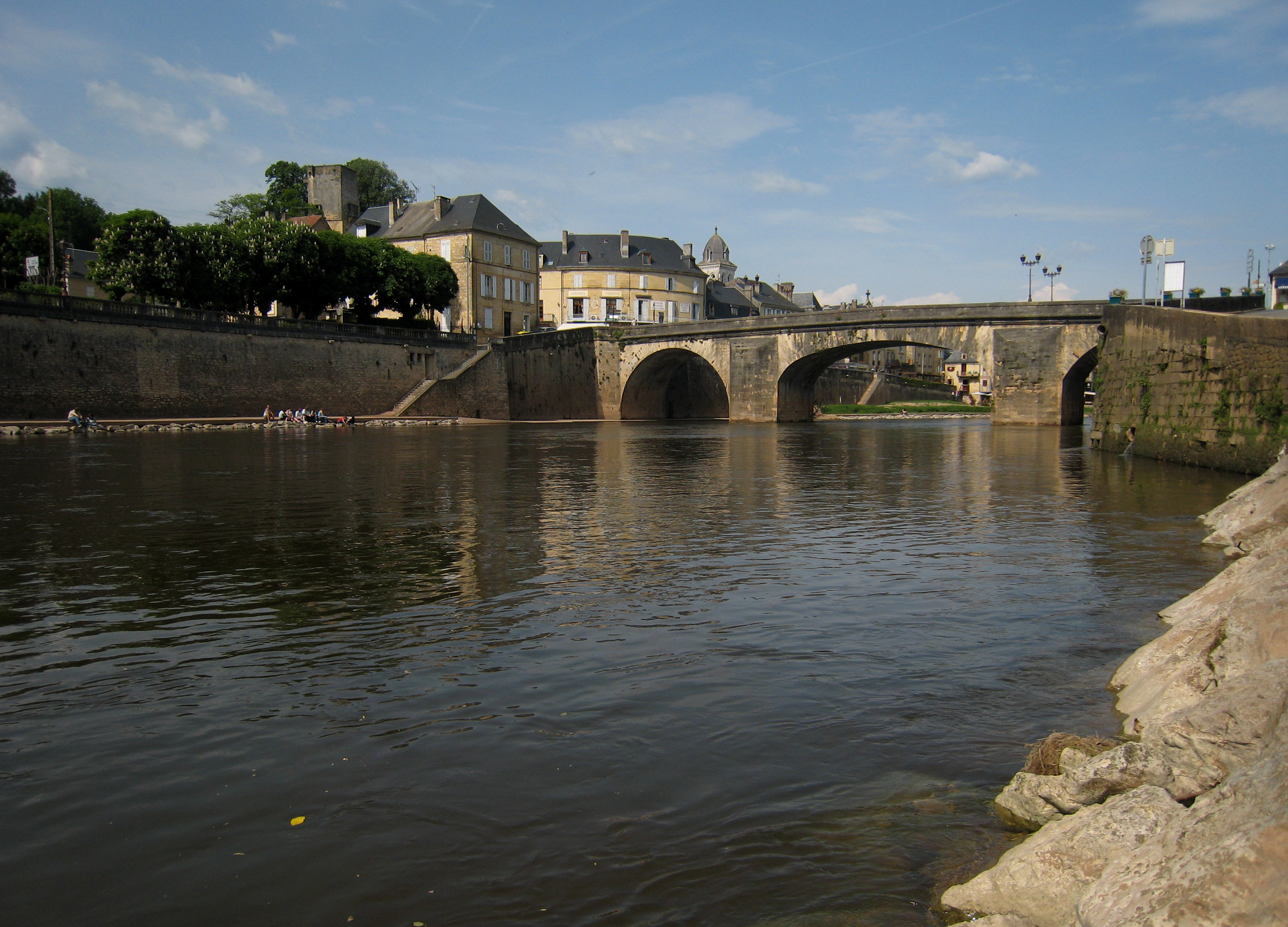
Bridge over the river Vézère in the village of Montignac

The Vézère (French pronunciation: [vezɛʁ]; Occitan: Vesera) is a 211-km-long river in southwestern France. It is an important tributary to the Dordogne. Its source is in the northwestern part of the elevated plateau known as the Massif Central. It flows into the Dordogne from the right near Le Bugue. The river Corrèze is a tributary of the Vézère.

The Vézère Valley is famed for its prehistoric cave systems, containing numerous cave paintings and hominid remains. UNESCO collectively designated these a World Heritage Site in 1979. Among the sites with remarkable caves is Lascaux.

== Geography ==
The Vézère takes its source in the bog of Longéroux, on the plateau of Millevaches, in the Massif Central in Corrèze, at 887 meters above sea level, in the commune of Meymac, west of the Puy Pendu (973 m) in the forest of Longéroux, at the place called sources de la Vézère. It flows into the Dordogne on the right bank at Limeuil, at an altitude of 50 metres. Its main tributary is the Corrèze; their confluence is located in the western suburbs of Brive-la-Gaillarde. Other tributaries are the Loyre, the Bradascou and the Brézou. The length of the Vézère is 211.2 km.

=== Departments and main communes crossed ===
It flows southwest through the following departments and cities:

- In Corrèze: Pérols-sur-Vézère, Bugeat, Uzerche, Vigeois, Brive-la-Gaillarde
- In Dordogne: Montignac, Terrasson-Lavilledieu, Les Eyzies-de-Tayac-Sireuil, Le Bugue

=== Facilities ===
The Vézère to Uzerche. In its upstream part, the Vézère has three major dams: the dam of Monceaux la Virolle (or de Monceaux la Virole), the barrage at Treignac, located between 500 and 650 meters above sea level, and the dam at Saillant, a little lower.

== Hydronymy ==
The river Visera is attested in Carolingian monastic medieval manuscripts in 889. It should not be confused in the Dordogne with the Upper Vézère, or Auvézère, a tributary of the L'Isle, 10 kilometers east of Périgueux.

The name Vézère comes, according to some scholars, from the ancient hydronym Vizara or Izara, formed by two contiguous Ligurian roots. The first, viz or iz, and the second ara. Viz or Iz means a "hollow Valley", and ara means a "watercourse", the word Vézère means "streams in the hollow valley".

It could also be a Celtic word Isara, meaning a "fast and impetuous flow (in case of flood)" to indicate to the travellers the dangers of a river during periods of intense rains or snow melt. The simple Latin variation is visara in the Gallo-Roman world which explains the logical phonetic evolution into Old French and Occitan.

== Prehistoric sites and decorated caves in the Vézère valley ==
The Vézère valley was dubbed the "Valley of Mankind" from the end of the nineteenth century following the numerous discoveries of exceptional prehistoric sites, including the Abri de Crô-Magnon, a rock shelter, the cave of Font-de-Gaume, and the Combarelles caves in Les Eyzies. It also the location of the Lascaux cave in Montignac. The prehistoric and ornate caves of the Vézère Valley are classified as UNESCO World Heritage Sites.
