= Prehistoric Sites and Decorated Caves of the Vézère Valley =

UNESCO World Heritage Site of prehistoric decorated caves in the Vézère Valley, France

UNESCO World Heritage Site
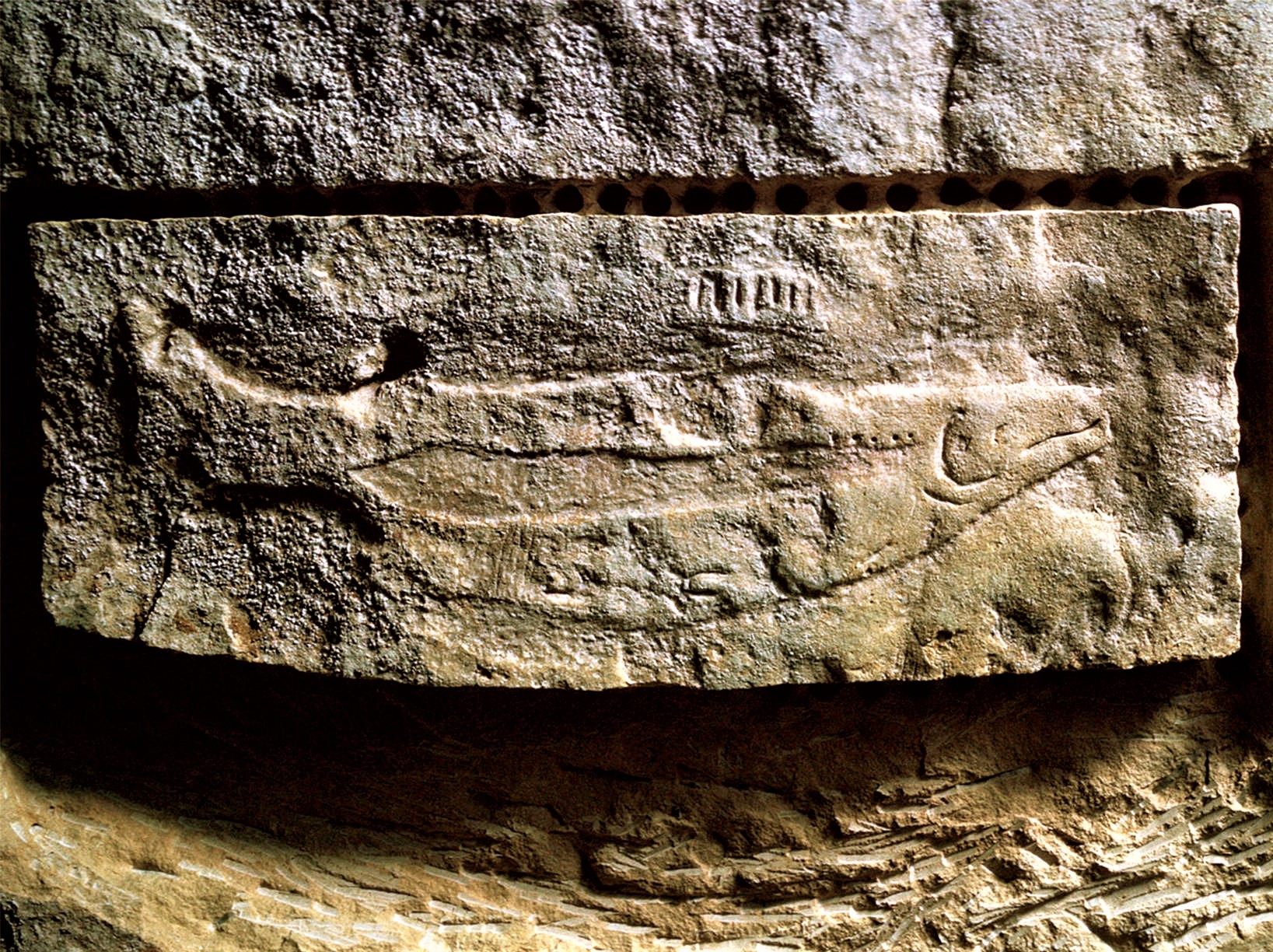
- Carved fish, from the Abri du Poisson

- Location within France
- Location: Vézère valley, Dordogne, Nouvelle-Aquitaine, France
- Includes: 1. Abri de Cro-Magnon; 2. Abri du Poisson; 3. Font de Gaume; 4. La Micoque; 5. La Mouthe; 6. Laugerie basse 7. Laugerie haute 8. Le Grand Roc; 9. Les Combarelles; 10. Le Cap Blanc; 11. Lascaux; 12. Cro de Granville (cro de Rouffignac); 13. Roc de Saint-Cirq; 14. Le Moustier; 15. La Madeleine
- Criteria: Cultural: (i)(iii)
- Reference: 85
- Inscription: 1979 (3rd Session)
- Coordinates: 45°3′27″N 1°10′12″E

The Prehistoric Sites and Decorated Caves of the Vézère Valley is a UNESCO World Heritage Site in France since 1979. It specifically lists 15 prehistoric sites in the Vézère valley in the Dordogne department, mostly in and around Les Eyzies-de-Tayac-Sireuil, which has been called the "Capital of Prehistory". This valley is exceptionally rich in prehistoric sites, with more than 150 known sites including 25 decorated caves, and has played an essential role in the study of the Paleolithic era and its art. Three of the sites are the namesakes for prehistoric periods; the Micoquien (named after La Micoque), Mousterian (after Le Moustier), and Magdalenian (after Abri de la Madeleine). Furthermore, the Cro-Magnon rock shelter gave its name to the Cro-Magnon, the generic name for the European early modern humans. Many of the sites were discovered or first recognised as significant and scientifically explored by the archaeologists Henri Breuil and Denis Peyrony in the early twentieth century, while Lascaux, which has the most exceptional rock art of these, was discovered in 1940.

The decorated caves in the region were instrumental in ending the debate about the nature of prehistoric art, which was still considered by many to be modern fakes. The late 19th century discoveries of first the Chabot cave (in 1879), Cave of Altamira (in 1880) and Pair-non-Pair (in 1881) were widely discussed, but no definite proof of their ancient origin was generally accepted. The cave of La Mouthe was the first cave in the Vézère region where decorations were discovered, but only with the double discoveries at Font-de-Gaume and Les Combarelles in 1901 was the debate finally settled.

The importance of the region as a centre of Paleolithic activity and art is explained in the "Larousse Encyclopedia of Prehistoric & Ancient Art":

For reasons not entirely understood, but most probably related to a unique abundance of game, the richness of glacial age occupation in certain valleys of south-west France is unparalleled elsewhere and these people were the finest artists. In particular the occupation sites of a short stretch of the Vézère valley in the Dordogne département have revealed a series of superimposed culture strata sometimes totalling many feet thick, which have enabled a sequence of culture types to be established.

— Desmond Collins and Lydie Huyghe, "Historical Summary: Prehistoric Art", Larousse Encyclopedia of Prehistoric & Ancient Art (Second edition, 1970)

The same book then lists 7 masterpieces of prehistoric art, including Lascaux, Les Combarelles and Font de Gaume.

Twelve of the 15 listed sites are open to a limited number of visitors per day (in most cases less than 100 per day). Two sites (La Mouthe and La Madeleine) are completely inaccessible to the public. In the case of Lascaux, the original cave is closed, but extensive 3D reproductions built nearby are easily accessible.

== Sites included in the UNESCO listing ==
=== Decorated caves ===
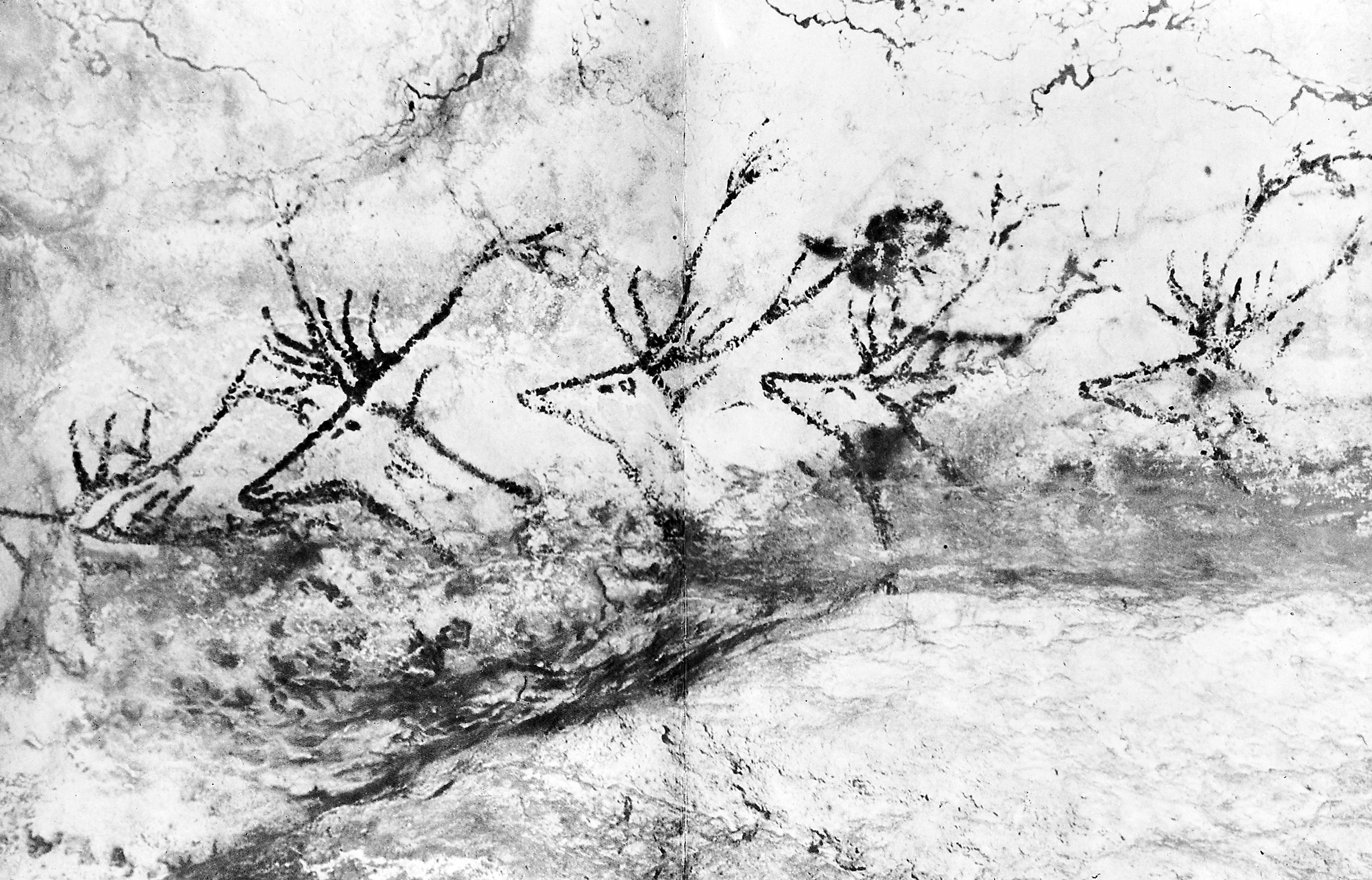
The "swimming deer" from Lascaux

- Abri du Poisson, a small cave in the Gorge d'Enfer, a small side valley of the Vézère in Les Eyzies; it was discovered in 1892, but the more than 1 metre long engraving of a fish which gives it its name was only found in 1912. Dating to the middle Gravettian, circa 25,000 years ago, it is one of the oldest known depictions of a fish in the world. It is bordered by a few other caves and shelters.
- Font-de-Gaume, in Les Eyzies, discovered in 1901: the first time prehistoric paintings were discovered in the region. The paintings of animals (mainly bison and horses, more than 200 in total) date to the Magdalenian and are about 17,000 years old. Font-de-Gaume is the only cave with polychrome prehistoric paintings still open to the public.
- La Mouthe, in Les Eyzies, was discovered in 1894. It contains engravings and paintings. A decorated lamp, and a human tooth and backbone were also found here. It is not open to the public.
- Les Combarelles, in Les Eyzies, a long (300 m (980 ft)) but narrow (1 m (3 ft 3 in)) cave with more than 600 prehistoric engravings and monochrome paintings. While the entry and a large branch on the right side were already known and excavated, the main branch was only discovered in 1901, just days before nearby Font-de-Gaume. It was inhabited between 13,000 and 11,000 years ago.
- Lascaux, in Montignac, was discovered in 1940. It is filled with around 600 polychrome paintings from about 17,000 years ago. It was opened to the public in 1948, but closed again in 1963 when it became clear that the paintings were being damaged by fungus and lichen growth caused by the changes in atmosphere brought along by the thousands of visitors. Exact reproductions can be visited since 1983 (Lascaux II, covering the two main chambers) and in 2016 Lascaux IV was opened, showing nearly all the paintings.
- Rouffignac Cave, in Rouffignac, is part of the longest cave system in the region. It contains a few hundred engravings and monochrome paintings, mainly of mammoths: most of these are situated about 2 km (1.2 mi) from the cave entrance. An electrical train takes visitors from the entrance to the location of the art. The easy accessibility of the cave lead to it being known much earlier than the other caves in this heritage site; the first mention of the art dates to 1575, and the cave was already a tourist attraction in the 19th century. The distance between the entry and the main groups of rock art here caused their belated discovery in 1956 only. Very few remains apart from the artworks have been found, making dating them difficult; but it is believed that they are about 13,000 years old.
- Roc de Saint-Cirq (usually known as "Grotte du Sorcier") in Les Eyzies, was discovered in 1952. It contains engravings and bas-reliefs, including one of a human called the "sorcerer" (le sorcier).

=== Other caves ===
- Le Grand Roc is a cave in Les Eyzies close to Laugerie-Basse. It was discovered in 1924 and opened to the public in 1926. It is the only entry in this heritage site without prehistoric elements.

=== Rock shelters ===
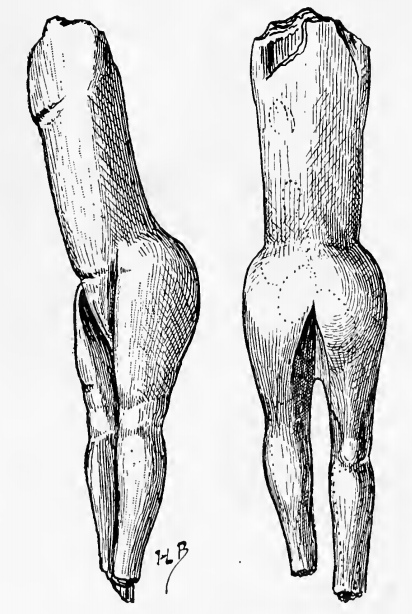
Venus impudique (1907 drawing), found in 1864 at Laugerie-Basse

- Cro-Magnon rock shelter, in Les Eyzies. The finds date to the Aurignacian. The site was discovered in 1868: remains of 5 humans (4 adults and a child) were found, dated to about 28,000 years ago. Seen as distinct from the recently discovered Neanderthals and as a precursor of modern man, the term "Cro-Magnon" was soon used to indicate all prehistoric modern men in Europe.
- La Micoque, in Les Eyzies. It gave its name to the Micoquien, and was also the first place where the Tayacian was recognised as a separate industry. This archaeological site was discovered in 1895 and has been the location of many excavations since. La Micoque is the site of some of the oldest traces of human presence in the region, dating back to approximately 450,000 years ago. The different layers, together some 10 metres high, are indicative of intermittent habitation here over a period of some 300,000 years.
- Laugerie-Basse, a 15 metre deep shelter in Les Eyzies. It has some art from the Magdalenian, and was inhabited ca. 14,000 years ago. The first excavations started here in 1863, but a more scientific approach was only taken from 1912 on. It has been completely excavated since, while the nearby contemporary Abri de Marseille (some 40 metres distant) still contains original material. In 1864 Paul Hurault, 8th Marquis de Vibraye found here the Vénus impudique, the first of many finds of a Paleolithic Venus figurine.
- Laugerie-Haute, in Les Eyzies, not far from Laugerie Basse. This 200 metres long shelter was inhabited from about 24,000 years ago until 15,000 years ago, and was first excavated in 1863. Stretching from the rock face to the river, it is one of the largest sites of the region.
- Cap Blanc rock shelter, in Marquay; discovered in 1908, this 15 metres long shelter has a 13m long, 2 metres high, and up to 30 cm deep relief frieze of animals, including 10 horses and some bison. It was originally coloured with red ochre and presumably other colours, but due to excavation errors it is now almost completely uncoloured. On the floor a single human skeleton of the so-called Magdalenian Girl was discovered in 1911.
- Le Moustier is a group of two rock shelters in Peyzac-le-Moustier. Excavations started in 1863. Many tools found here which were instrumental in defining the Mousterian period, lasting from ca. 160,000 years ago until ca. 40,000 years ago. In 1908 a Neanderthal skull was found here as well: it is thought to be about 45,000 years old.
- Abri de la Madeleine, in Tursac, was the type site for the Magdalenian period, ranging from about 17,000 to about 12,000 years ago. First discovered in 1863 and roughly excavated in the following years, it was in 1921-1922 again studied, more scientifically this time, by Dennis Peyrony. On the site has been found a buried child of around three years old, dating to about 10,000 years ago, with a robe decorated with more than 1,000 small shells, called the Enfant de la Madeleine. Some sculpted reindeer bone spear-throwers have also been found here, including the Bison Licking Insect Bite. Extensive medieval troglodyte ruins remain at the same place but higher above the river.

== History of archaeological research in the region ==
=== The 1860s: first scientific explorations ===
The sites cover a period of nearly 400,000 years of human habitation, starting at La Micoque (inhabited from ca. 400,000 years ago until 100,000 years ago) and ending about 8,000 years ago. Excavations in the Dordogne region started in 1810, but only in 1863 were the first scientific researches made by the paleontologist Edouard Lartet together with the Englishman Henry Christy; in a period of five months they visited numerous sites in Les Eyzies, including the Grotte Richard, some shelters in the Gorge d'Enfer, Laugerie Basse, Laugerie Haute, La Madeleine and Le Moustier. In 1872 the latter two became the eponymous sites for the Magdalenian and Micoquian cultures, so-called by Gabriel de Mortillet. Lartet previously already had excavated the Cave of Aurignac, which gave its name to the Aurignacian, and had published his finds of a few of the earliest decorated objects from the Upper Paleolithicum.

In 1864 they found at La Madeleine an engraving on ivory, showing a mammoth: this was the first definitive piece of evidence that the inhabitants of these rock shelters had lived at the same time as some long-extinct animals.

In 1868 the human remains of the Cro-Magnon rock shelter were discovered, and in 1872 a prehistoric skeleton was found at Laugerie Basse. The first decorated cave of the region was found in 1896 at La Mouthe: it was the fourth decorated cave found in Europe, some 20 years after the other three had been discovered.

=== Turn of the century; the first decorated caves ===
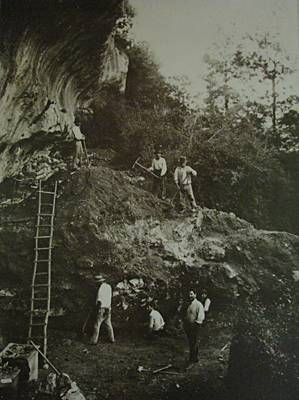
Excavations at the Abri du Cap Blanc in 1911

At the start of the 20th century, the excavations in the Vézère valley multiply, with two major effects: the authenticity of rock art is finally established, and a full chronology of the technological cultures in prehistoric Western Europe is developed. In 1895, for the first time a cave with decorations from the Paleolithic is recognised as such in France, when the cave of la Mouthe is investigated by archaeologist Émile Rivière. Engravings are found some 90 metres of the entrance of the cave. Rivière continues to excavate here for five years, finding many artifacts including a lamp with an image of an ibex. His conclusion that some of the engravings had been covered by stalagmites, thereby showing their great age, was one of the main arguments to get the reality of prehistoric rock art finally accepted. He also produced the first photographs of such art.

Most important for the rock art were the discoveries in 1901 of the engravings of Combarelles by Henri Breuil, Denis Peyrony and Louis Capitan, and the first look at the polychrome paintings in Font de Gaume, eight days later, by Peyrony. In 1902, Émile Cartailhac, the main critic of the notion that Paleolithic humans would have been capable of producing such art, upon seeing the reports about the two caves and La Mouthe, became convinced that the believers had been right all along. He wrote for the journal "L'Anthropologie" the article "Les cavernes ornées de dessins. La grotte d'Altamira, Espagne. Mea culpa d'un sceptique".

Breuil and Peyrony are also behind most of the other major finds in the next few years, including Bernifal in 1902, the abri du Cap Blanc in 1909, and Laussel in 1911. In the same period, major sites permitting to develop the stratigraphic sequence of periods and cultures are found as well, including in 1909 La Ferrassie with its large number of Neanderthal burials, and the site of Laugerie Basse. Peyrony, a teacher from Les Eyzies, became inspector of archaeological sites in 1910, and established the museum of Les Eyzies (later the National Museum of Prehistory) in 1913. The final major find so far is the discovery of Lascaux in 1940.

== Other prehistoric sites in the region ==
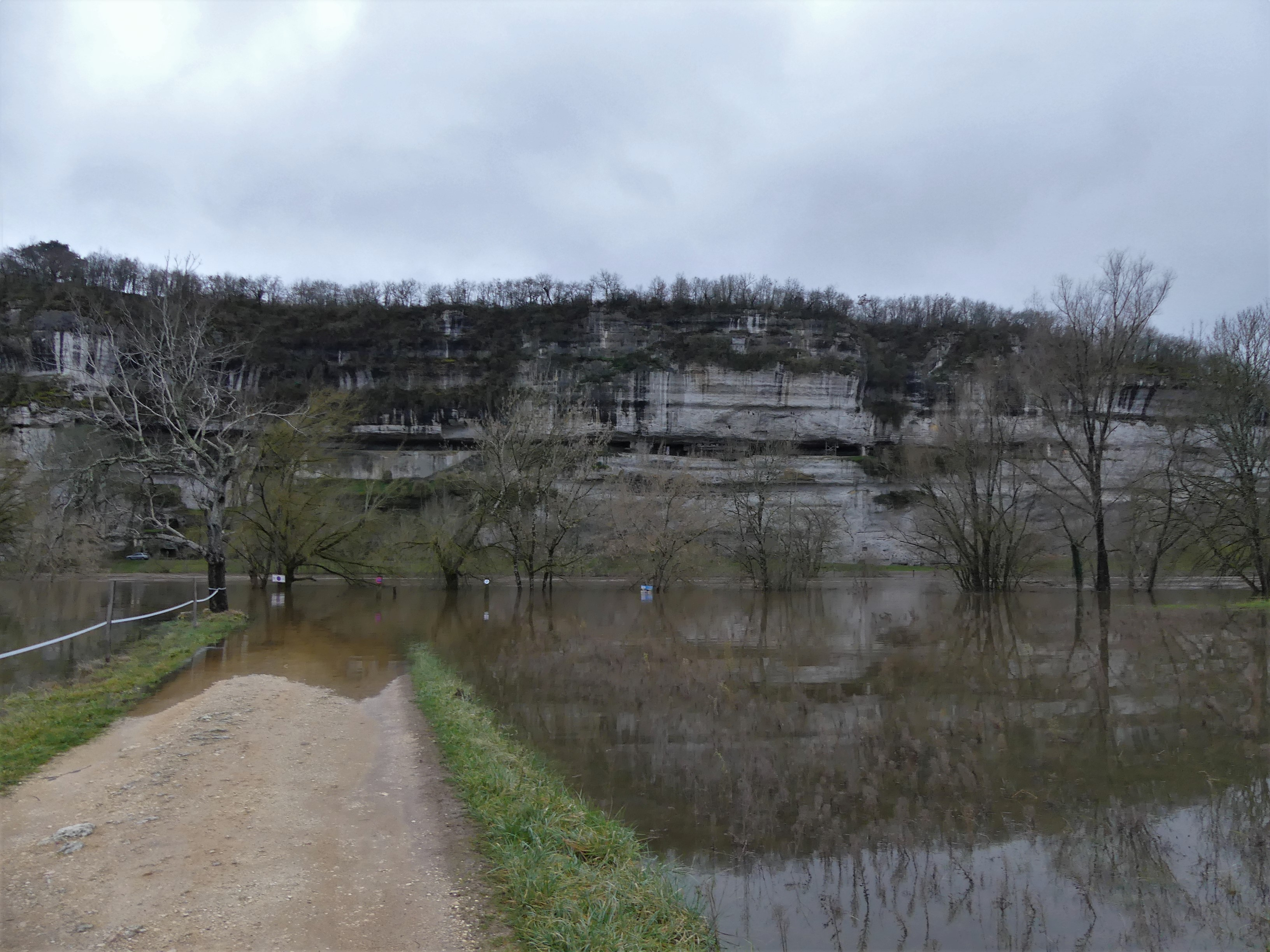
Roque Saint-Christophe, prehistoric and medieval rock shelter in Peyzac-le-Moustier, with the Vézère river in the foreground

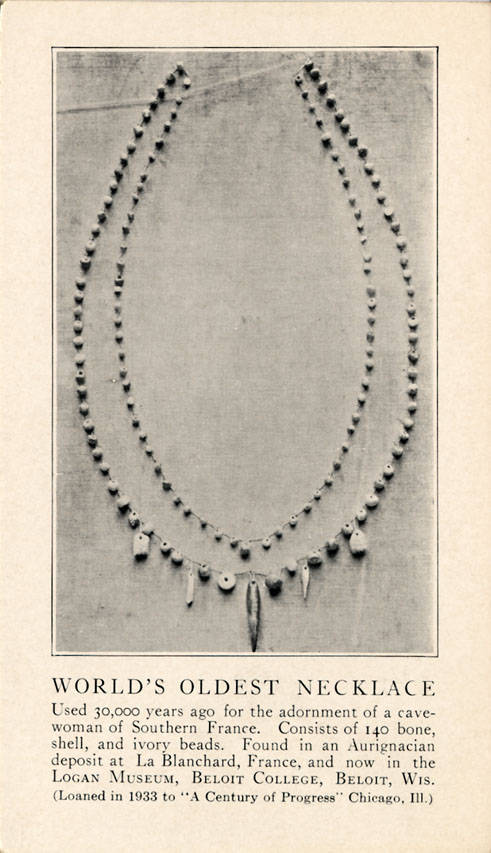
Reconstruction of the necklace found at Castel Merle

=== Campagne ===
- Muzardie cave, discovered in 1978: contains paleolithic engravings
- Roc de Marsal, first excavated in 1953: burial site of a Neanderthal child, discovered in 1961

=== Le Bugue ===
- Bara-Bahau cave, discovered in 1951; it contains some 18 engravings, including mainly animals but also a hand and a phallus: it is opened to the public

=== Les Eyzies de Tayac ===
- Abri Pataud, site of prehistoric dwellings in Les Eyzies; important for the clear stratigraphic layers which have been used for radiocarbon dating, serves as a reference site for the chronology. Various engravings and a female bas-relief were found here as well. Open to the public.
- Château de Commarque, a medieval ruin in Les Eyzies, has underneath the castle a cave, discovered in 1915, with 150 prehistoric carvings of animals, including a horse head in relief.

=== Marquay ===
- Abri de Laussel, where the Venus of Laussel was found in 1911

=== Meyrals ===
- Bernifal cave, with paintings and engravings

=== Montignac ===
- La Balutie
- Le Regourdou, Neanderthal burial site near Lascaux, discovered in 1957

=== Peyzac-le-Moustier ===
- Roque Saint-Christophe, a very large rock shelter (1 km long, 60 m high) inhabited already around 50,000 years ago.

=== Savignac-de-Miremont ===
- La Ferrassie, Neanderthal burial place

=== Sergeac ===
- Castel Merle, a series of 12 rock shelters (6 on each side of a small valley); the findings include some necklaces, and a bas relief with multiple animals. The site is open to the public and has a small museum

== Prehistory museums and visitor centres ==
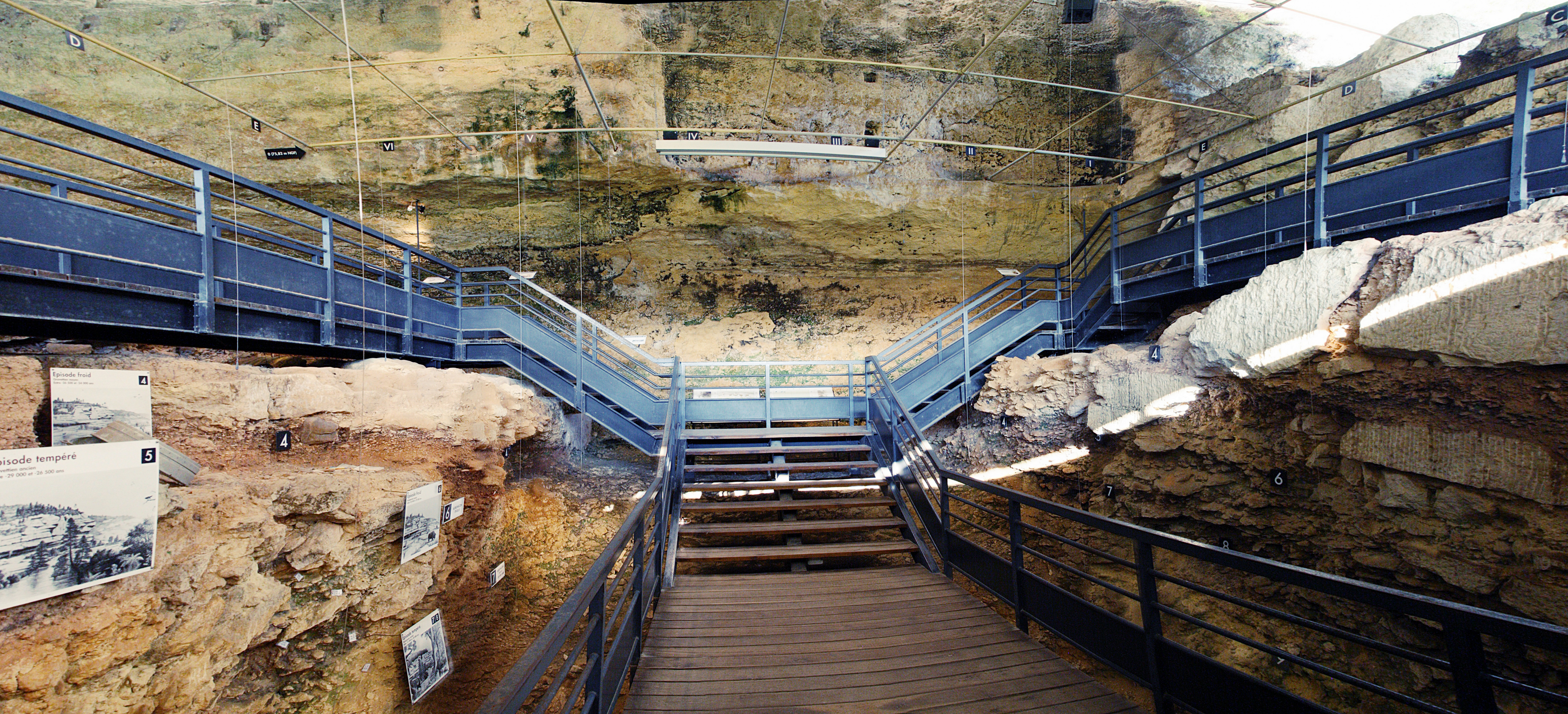
Abri Pataud, in Les Eyzies, showing the build-up of layers through the years

Some of the above sites have small museums or displays showcasing some of the archaeological finds made there, e.g. at Castel Merle. The region also has three main visitor centres: the National Museum of Prehistory (in and around the Château de Tayac) and the International Pole of Prehistory in les Eyzies, and Lascaux IV in Montignac.
