= Rouffignac Cave =

French site containing prehistoric art

- Grotte de Rouffignac (French)
- Cave of the hundred mammoths, Miremont cave, Cro des Cluzeau, Cro de Granville
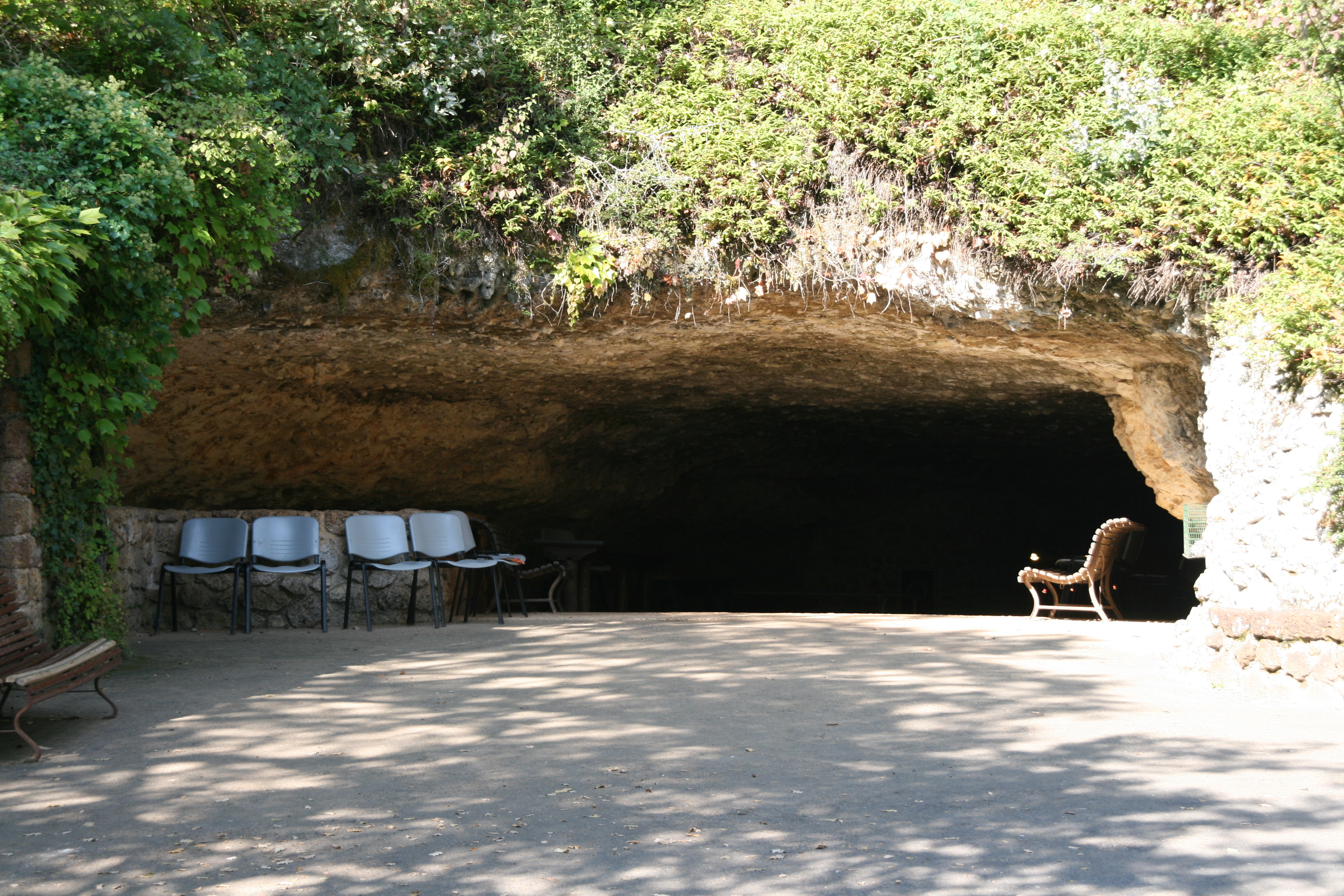
- Rouffignac Cave

- location in Nouvelle-Aquitaine, France
- 45°00′32″N 0°59′15″E
- Type: Cave paintings
- Cultures: Magdalenian
- Location: Rouffignac-Saint-Cernin-de-Reilhac, Nouvelle-Aquitaine, France

History
- Built: c. 11,000 BC
- Abandoned: c. 5800 BC

UNESCO World Heritage Site
- Official name: Cro de Granville (cro de Rouffignac)
- Part of: Prehistoric Sites and Decorated Caves of the Vézère Valley
- Criteria: Cultural: (i), (iii)
- Reference: 85-012
- Inscription: 1979 (3rd Session)
- Area: 51.76 ha (0.1998 sq mi)

The Rouffignac cave, in the French commune of Rouffignac-Saint-Cernin-de-Reilhac in the Dordogne département, contains over 250 engravings and cave paintings dating back to the Upper Paleolithic. In conjunction with other caves and abris of the Vézère valley, the Rouffignac cave was classified a Monument historique in 1957 and a World Heritage Site in 1979 by UNESCO as part of the Prehistoric Sites and Decorated Caves of the Vézère Valley.

== Geography and description of the cave ==
The Cave of the hundred mammoths, also known as Miremont cave, Cro des Cluzeau or Cro de Granville, is about 5 km (3.1 mi) south of Rouffignac on a hill slope along the right-hand side of the La Binche river, a left tributary of the Manaurie. Perched only about one kilometer farther east on the opposite side of the valley is the little village of Fleurac. The rocks of the cave are flat-lying limestones belonging to the uppermost Coniacian; they are very rich in flint nodules. These rocks together with overlying Santonian rocks form the limestone plateau of Légal, the divide between the drainage basins of the rivers Lisle and Vézère.

The Rouffignac cave and the Villars Cave possess the most extensive cave system of the Périgord, with more than 8 km (5.0 mi) of underground passageways. There are 10 natural shafts that lead to a deeper level. So far, a further 4 km (2.5 mi) of passageways have been explored in this deeper level. Below the deeper level exists a bottom level with a small underground rivulet. Visitors of the cave board an electric train that takes them about 2 km (1.2 mi) into the interior.

The plan of the cave reveals a fractal-like dendritic pattern that is not random but organized along certain preferred directions. Presumably the cave was formed during the Pliocene around 3 to 2 million years ago. Water had infiltrated the bedrock along certain zones of weakness and dissolved the limestone. Today this process has come to an end, and the cave is mostly dry except for the rivulet along the base level.

== History ==
The Rouffignac cave was mentioned in 1575 by François de Belleforest. In his Cosmographie universelle he cites “paintings and animal traces”. In the 19th century, the cave was known as a tourist attraction. Famous archeologists such as Henri Breuil, André Glory and Édouard-Alfred Martel had visited the cave in the early 20th century, but it was only in 1956 that Louis-René Nougier and Romain Robert, two prehistorians from the Pyrenees, rediscovered and confirmed the cave art. During the Second World War the cave served as a hide-out for the French Résistance. In 1959 the cave was officially opened for visitors. In his editorial in 'Antiquity' December 1958 (reproduced in 'Writing for Antiquity'..Thames and Hudson ) Glyn Daniel mentions the then disputed authenticity of the paintings at Rouffignac.He compares the dispute to the Glozel forgeries and the Piltdown man which authenticities were initially endorsed by many archaeologists. He notes that Martel spent eighteen hours in the caves in 1893 and saw nothing, and the four members of Cambridge University Speleologic Society who visited Rouffignac in 1939 and saw nothing. He further quotes O G S Crawford, previous editor of 'Antiquity' who asserted that 'those who believe in their authenticity have been the victims of a hoax'.

== Artistic representations ==
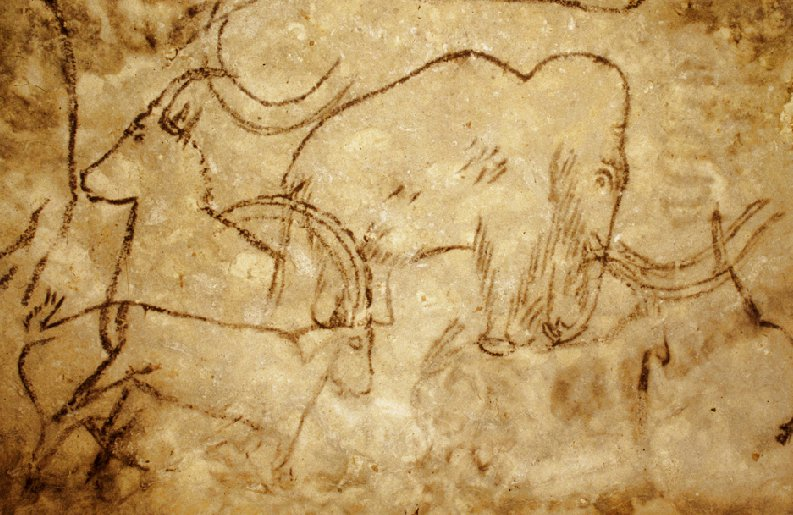
Mammoth and ibex

The artistic representations in the cave were mainly executed as engravings or black contour drawings. In contrast with the caves in Lascaux and Font-de-Gaume, and Altamira in Spain, the representations in the Rouffignac cave are not polychrome. So far 224 animal representations and 4 human figures have been registered. The animal representations can be subdivided as follows:

- 158 mammoths (70% of all represented animals)
- 28 bisons
- 15 horses
- 12 ibex
- 10 woolly rhinoceros

Additionally there is a single cave bear. Amongst the six animal groups cited, the mammoths take on a prominent role. The woolly rhinoceros are also more common than in other similar caves, where representations are rare.

Finger flutings at the start of the Desbordes panel in chamber A1

Signs are somewhat underrepresented with 17 tectiform (house-like) and 6 serpentiform (snake-like) signs being known. Fairly common are finger flutings, macaroni- or meander-like traces that take up a surface of 500 m^{2} (5,400 sq ft) and decorate walls and ceilings. In September 2011 Jess Cooney, a Cambridge archeologist, and Dr Leslie Van Gelder of Walden University, USA announced that their research had identified the artists who had created a large proportion of the flutings to be children as young as three years old. 63 animal representations alone are found on the ceiling of the so-called Le Grand Plafond chamber. Here again the representations are associated with a shaft.

== Cave bears ==
The presence of cave bears in the Rouffignac cave is attested by scratch marks on the walls, and also by the remains of their resting places.

== Age ==
Because of the general lack of artifacts (a single blade was found so far) and occupation traces, the Rouffignac cave could not be dated directly so far. According to André Leroi-Gourhan the style of the representations can be attributed to his style IV and belong therefore into the Middle Magdalenian, about 13,000 years BP.

Reconnaissance excavations in front of the entry of the cave found traces of human occupations (several fireplaces, animal bones and stone tools) dating back to the Mesolithic (Tardenoisian and Sauveterrian) and to the Neolithic. Some Iron Age remains capped the deposits. Therefore, mesolithic hunters must have had their encampment in front of the cave from about 9,200 to 7,800 years BP. In the Sauveterrian level, geometrically shaped microliths were found, the so-called Rouffignac heads. The neolithic and Iron Age levels yielded remnants of burials.

== Visiting the cave ==
The Rouffignac cave is open to the public between 1 April and 1 November. The number of visitors is restricted to 550 per day.

== See also ==
- Cave of Altamira
- Font-de-Gaume
- Lascaux
- Les Combarelles

== Literature ==
- Leroi-Gourhan, A. (1988). Rouffignac. In: Dictionnaire de la Préhistoire, sous la dir. d'A. Leroi-Gourhan, Presses universitaires de France, Paris, pp. 959–960
- Plassard, Jean (1999). Rouffignac. Thorbecke, Stuttgart. ISBN 3-7995-9006-4
