= Louis Lartet =

French scientist

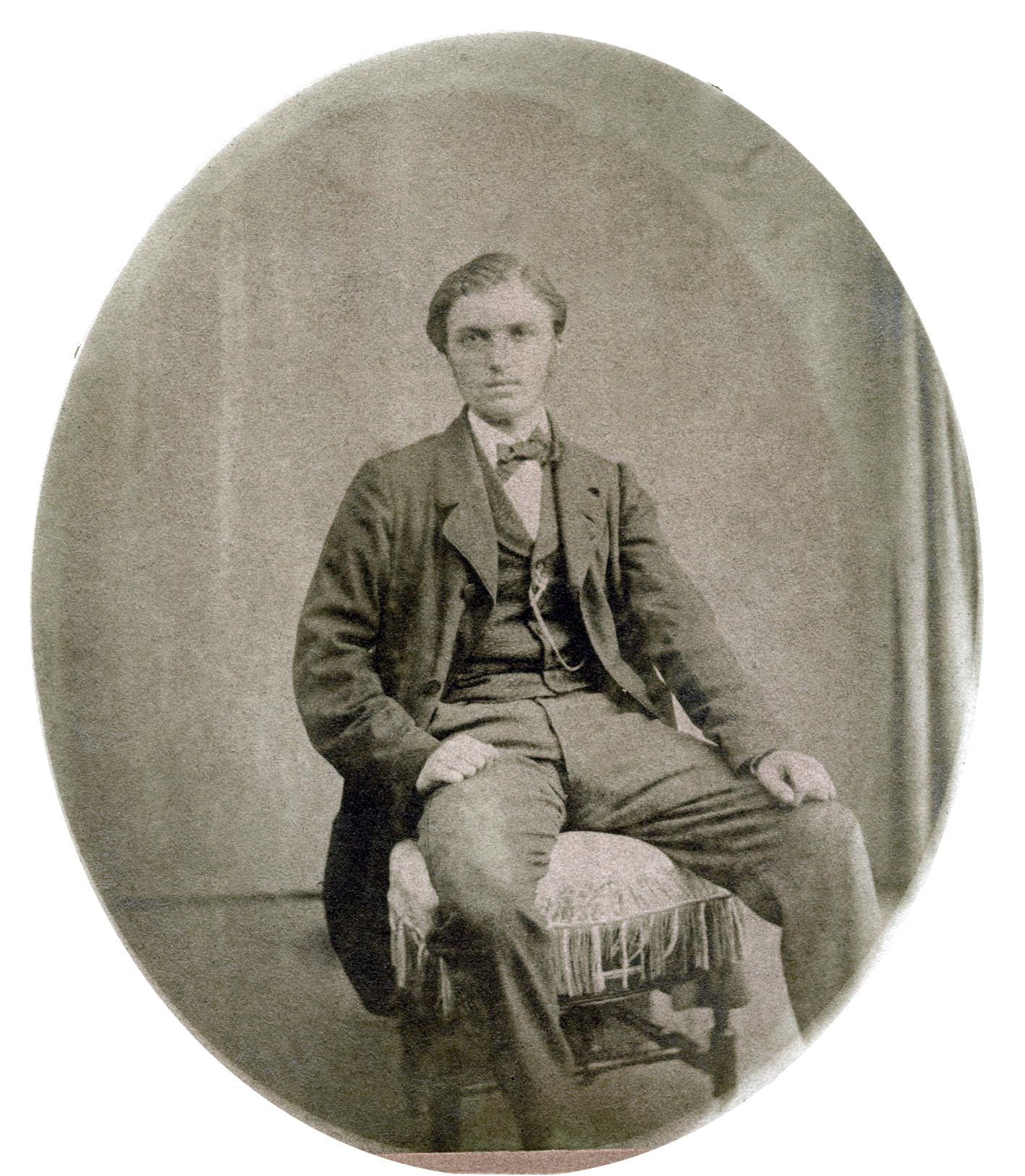
- Born: 18 December 1840; Castelnau-Magnoac, France
- Died: 16 August 1899 (aged 58); Seissan, France
- Scientific career
- Fields: Geology, paleontology
- Thesis: Essai sur la géologie de la Palestine et des contrées avoisinantes (1869)

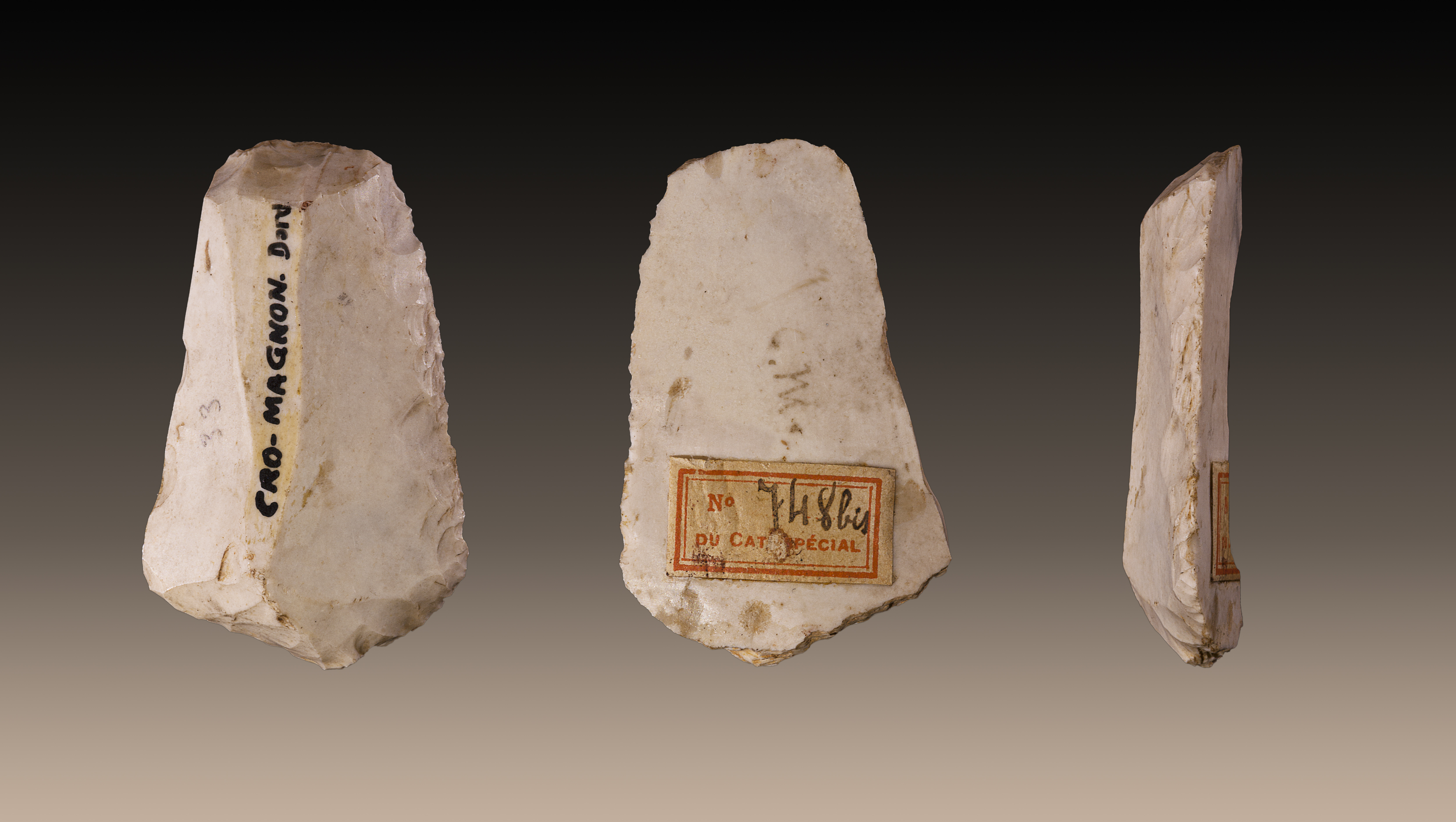
Double edged Scraper on blade from Cro-Magnon - Collection Louis Lartet - Muséum de Toulouse

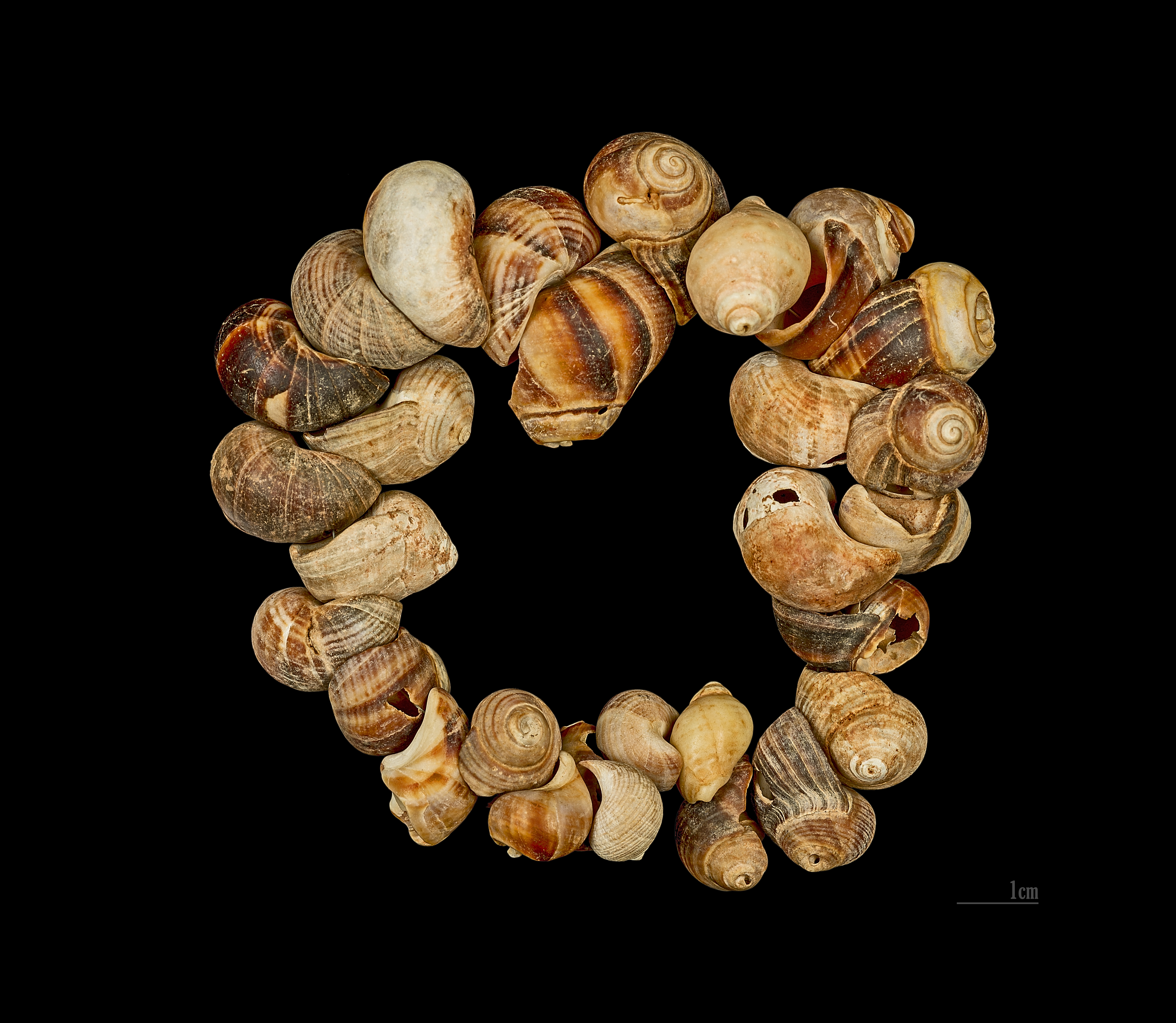
Shell adornement of Cro-Magnon - Collection Louis Lartet - Muséum de Toulouse

Louis Lartet (1840 – 1899) was a French geologist and paleontologist. He discovered the original Cro-Magnon skeletons.

Louis Lartet was born in Castelnau-Magnoac, in Seissan in the département of Gers. His father, Édouard Lartet was a prominent geologist and prehistorian who played a key role in the 1860s and 1870s in finding evidence that humans had lived during the Quaternary period and Louis continued his father's researches into human prehistory. He became a member of the Société géologique de France (Geological Society of France) in 1863 and joined the expedition organized by the Duke of Luynes to explore Palestine. This resulted in his publication of Exploration géologique de la mer Morte (1876-7), which formed his doctoral thesis. In 1868, Lartet was asked to conduct excavations in a rock shelter near the French village of Les Eyzies after workmen stumbled upon extinct animal bones, flint tools, and human skulls. Lartet discovered the partial skeletons of four prehistoric adults and one infant along with perforated shells used as ornaments, an object made from ivory, and worked reindeer antler. These Cro-magnon humans were soon identified as a new prehistoric human race distinct from the Neanderthal man fossils discovered in Germany in 1856.

Lartet began teaching geology at the University of Toulouse in 1873 and in 1879 he became a tenured professor of geology at the university. He became a member of the Société archéologique du midi de la France in 1879, the Société d'agriculture in 1880; the Académie des sciences in 1882 and the Société d'histoire naturelle in 1882.

== Works ==
“Mémoire sur une sepulture des anciens troglodytes du Périgord.” Annales des sciences naturelles: Zoologie et paléontologie ser 5, 10 (1868): 133-45.

“Une sépulture des troglodytes du Périgord,” Bulletins de la Société d’Anthropologie de Paris 3 (1868): 335-349.

with Chaplain Duparc, “Sur une sépulture des anciens Troglodytes des Pyrénées superposée à un foyer contenant des débris humains associés à des dents sculptées de Lion et d'Ours.” Matériaux pour l’histoire primitive et naturelle de l’homme 2 ser., 9 (1874): 101-67.

Paléontologie. Paris: Masson, 1873.

Sur la dentition des proboscidiens fossiles (Dinotherium, Mastodontes et Éléphants) et sur la distribution géographique et stratigraphique de leurs débris en Europe. Paris : Martinet, 1859.

== See also ==
- List of fossil sites (with link directory)
- List of hominina (hominid) fossils (with images)
