= Émile Rivière =

French speleologist

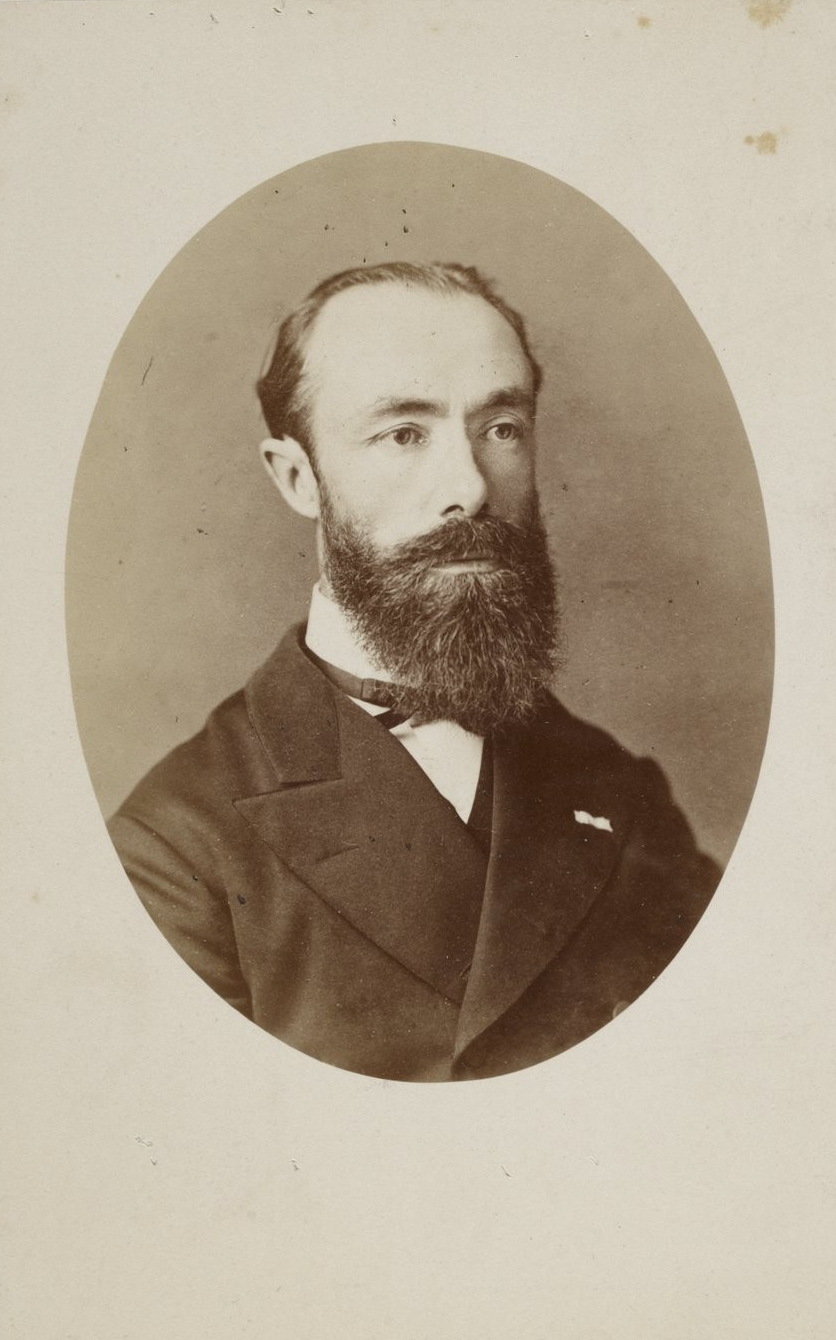

Émile-Valère Rivière de Précourt (22 April 1835 - 25 January 1922) was a French physician and specialist in prehistory who conducted explorations of caves in the region for human remains. He was known for his cave research at Balzi Rossi in Ventimiglia in Liguria and La Mouthe in Dordogne. He coined the term speleology. He was a founder of the prehistory society of France (Société préhistorique française).

Rivière was born in Paris where his father was a physician. He went to the Lycée Bonaparte and trained in medicine and interned at the Asile de Vincennes at Le Vésinet. From 1868 he lived in Cannes and from 1870 at Menton. He visited Baoussé-Roussé (Balzi Rossi) in Italy along with Stanislas Bonfils in 1869 and the finds were contributed to Bonfil's private museum. Repeat visits from 1870 led to the discovery of a human skeleton from the Upper Paleolithic known as the "Menton Man". Other skeletal finds followed. In 1877 he joined Léon de Vesly to the Vallée des Merveilles. In 1887 he wrote a book on the antiquity of man (De l’antiquité de l’homme dans les Alpes-Maritimes) which earned him the Vaillant Prize of the Academy of Sciences. In 1887 he began to examine Dordogne, visiting the Laussel shelter and made excavations in the Combarelles cave. In 1895 he discovered wall paintings from the Paleolithic. In 1890, Émile Rivière coined the term speleology from Greek spêlaion (cave) and logos (science) to designate the science of caves. In 1903 he founded the Prehistoric Society of France along with Paul Raymond and served as its first president. Late in 1887 Rivière turned his attention to the caves of the Dordogne.
