= Magdalenian Girl =

Hominin fossil found in Dordogne, France

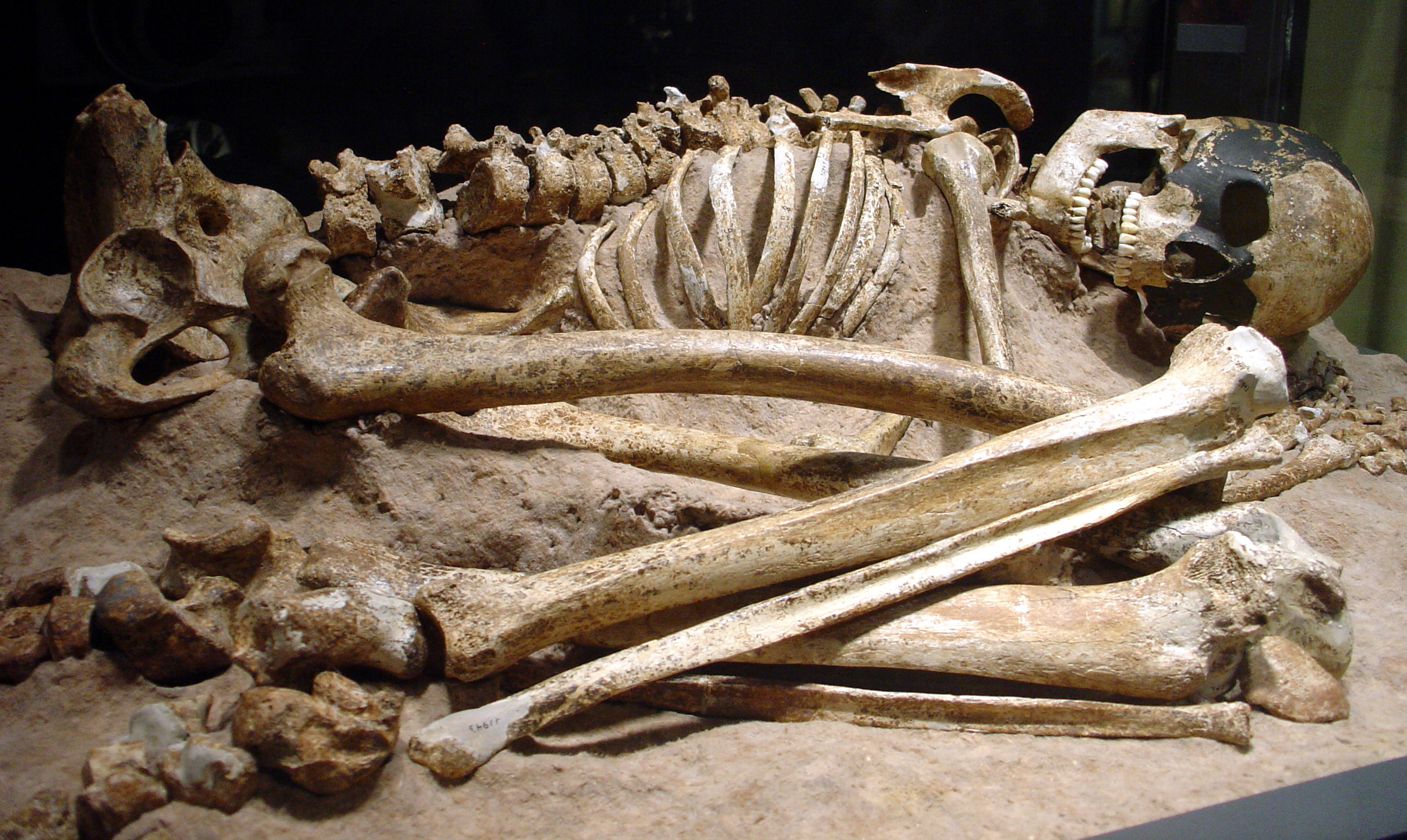
- Skeleton of the Magdalenian Girl, an early modern human from the Magdalenian period, discovered in the Cap Blanc rock shelter
- Born: c. 13000–11000 BC
- Died: c. 13000–11000 BC (age 25–35); Dordogne region, modern France
- Burial place: Cap Blanc rock shelter
- Other name: Magdalenian Woman
- Known for: impacted wisdom teeth
- Height: 156 cm (5 ft 1 1/2 in)

"Magdalenian Girl" or "Magdalenian Woman" (French: Femme magdalénienne) is the common name for a human skeleton, dated to the boundary between the Upper Paleolithic and the early Mesolithic, ca. 15,000 to 13,000 years old, in the Magdalenian period. The remains were discovered in 1911 in the Dordogne region of southwestern France in a limestone cave known as the Cap Blanc rock shelter. The find was made when a workman drove a pickaxe into the cliff face in the rock shelter, shattering the skull. It is the most complete Upper Paleolithic skeleton in Northern Europe.

When Magdalenian Girl was acquired in 1926 for the Field Museum in Chicago, Illinois by Henry Field, then curator of Physical Anthropology, it was hailed as one of the most significant acquisitions the museum ever made. On the first day the precious specimen was exhibited, tens of thousands of visitors flocked to the museum to see it.

== Skeletal analysis ==
=== Sex ===
There was some speculation as to her sex but it was ultimately decided by the size and shape of her pelvic bones, which is a major indicator of sex in skeletons.

=== Age ===
There is still some debate about the age of Magdalenian Girl. For years, the individual was thought to be a young girl, because her wisdom teeth had not yet advanced, but new analysis indicates that her wisdom teeth were impacted, and that she was actually 25 to 35 years old when she died. This is the oldest recorded case of impacted wisdom teeth. Other evidence that indicated her age were fully fused epiphyses and degenerative wear on her vertebrae. According to Dr. Robert D. Martin, primatologist and Field Museum provost, along with Dr. William Pestle, Field Museum Collection Manager, Drs. Michael Colvard and Richard Jurevic of the College of Dentistry at the University of Illinois at Chicago, Magdalenian Girl is most likely significantly older than 18–21 years.

== Teeth ==
There has been much debate over Magdalenian Girl's age due to her impacted wisdom teeth. According to Science Daily, impaction during the Stone Age was unknown because of the coarse diet of the period. This diet would have required more chewing and higher bite forces which could result in more growth of the jawbone and thereby creating more room for wisdom teeth to erupt. According to Robert D. Martin, "Finding impacted wisdom teeth 15,000 years ago indicates that the human diet might have already changed, some would say 'deteriorated,' earlier than previously thought." Dr. Martin, along with Dr. William Pestle, Field Museum Collection Manager, Drs. Michael Colvard and Richard Jurevic of the College of Dentistry at the University of Illinois at Chicago studied the impacted wisdom teeth and came to the conclusion that Magdalenian Girl was a woman by employing new tools and technology.

== Digital reconstruction ==
In 2012, anthropologists began scanning a replica skull of Magdalenian Girl to create a high resolution digital model. In order to do this, they used a high quality x-ray scanning machine to produce a CT scan, which recorded images of the skull from multiple angles. The digital reconstruction took place at Alloyweld Inspection Company. Unfortunately, when these remains were originally found, the archaeologists had accidentally shattered the skull with a pickaxe and had to piece it back together. Before the scanning process, the skull was in at least six pieces and was inexpertly put back together. This makes it difficult for anthropologists to understand what Magdalenian Girl looked like and to answer important questions about the remains.

The new digital images will allow anthropologists to know if the skull has deteriorated in recent decades. The new images can also be used to digitally reconstruct the skull in order to prevent further damage. If a good enough scan is constructed, then facial reconstruction experts will be able to give a more accurate depiction of the individual. According to the Daily Herald, the best description for Magdalenian girl to date is that she was 5 ft 4 in (163 cm) and died around 24 years old.

In 2013, a French sculptor named Elisabeth Daynes completed a facial reconstruction of Magdalenian Girl by using a printed version of the CT scan of the skull. The reconstruction includes strong cheekbones, decorative hair beads, and a Mona Lisa-like smile, in which the teeth are not visible.
