= Font-de-Gaume =

Cave and archaeological site in France

Font-de-Gaume cave
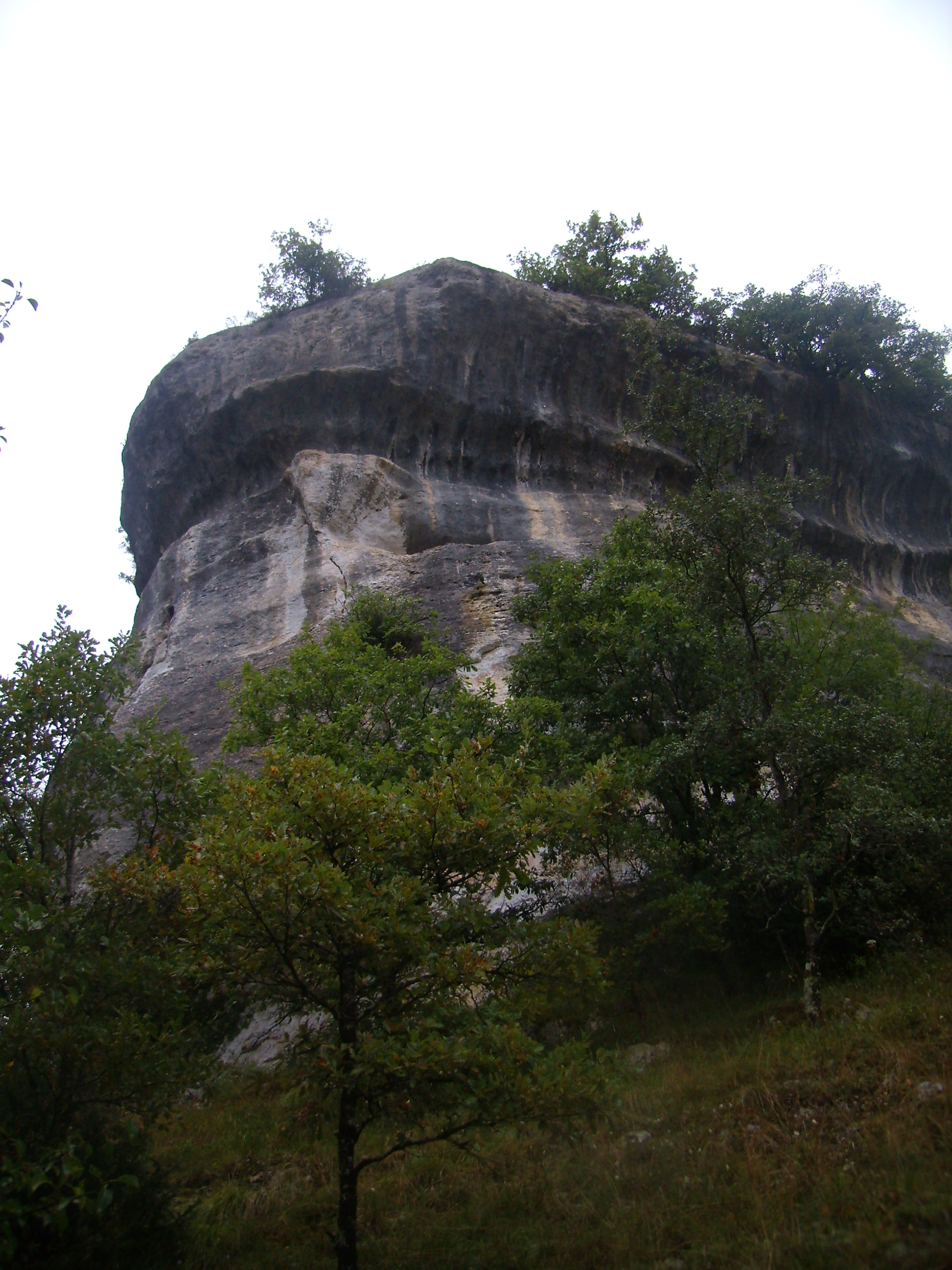
- Cliff at Font-de-Gaume

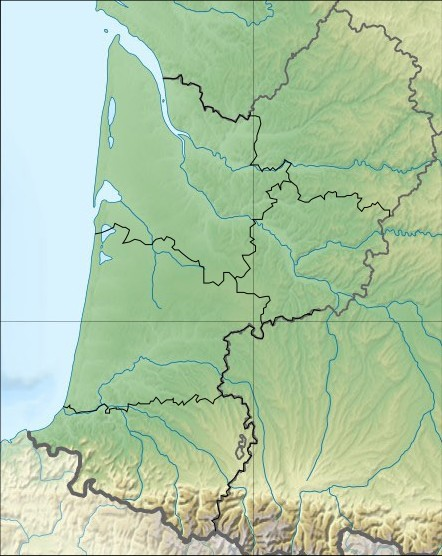
- Location in France Font-de-Gaume (France)
- 44°56′13″N 1°1′36″E
- Cultures: Magdalenian
- Location: near Les Eyzies,
- Region: Dordogne, France

Site notes
- Excavation dates: 1901,
- Archaeologists: Denis Peyrony

UNESCO World Heritage Site
- Official name: Font de Gaume
- Part of: Prehistoric Sites and Decorated Caves of the Vézère Valley
- Criteria: Cultural: (i), (iii)
- Reference: 85-003
- Inscription: 1979 (3rd Session)
- Area: 5.216 ha (561,400 sq ft)

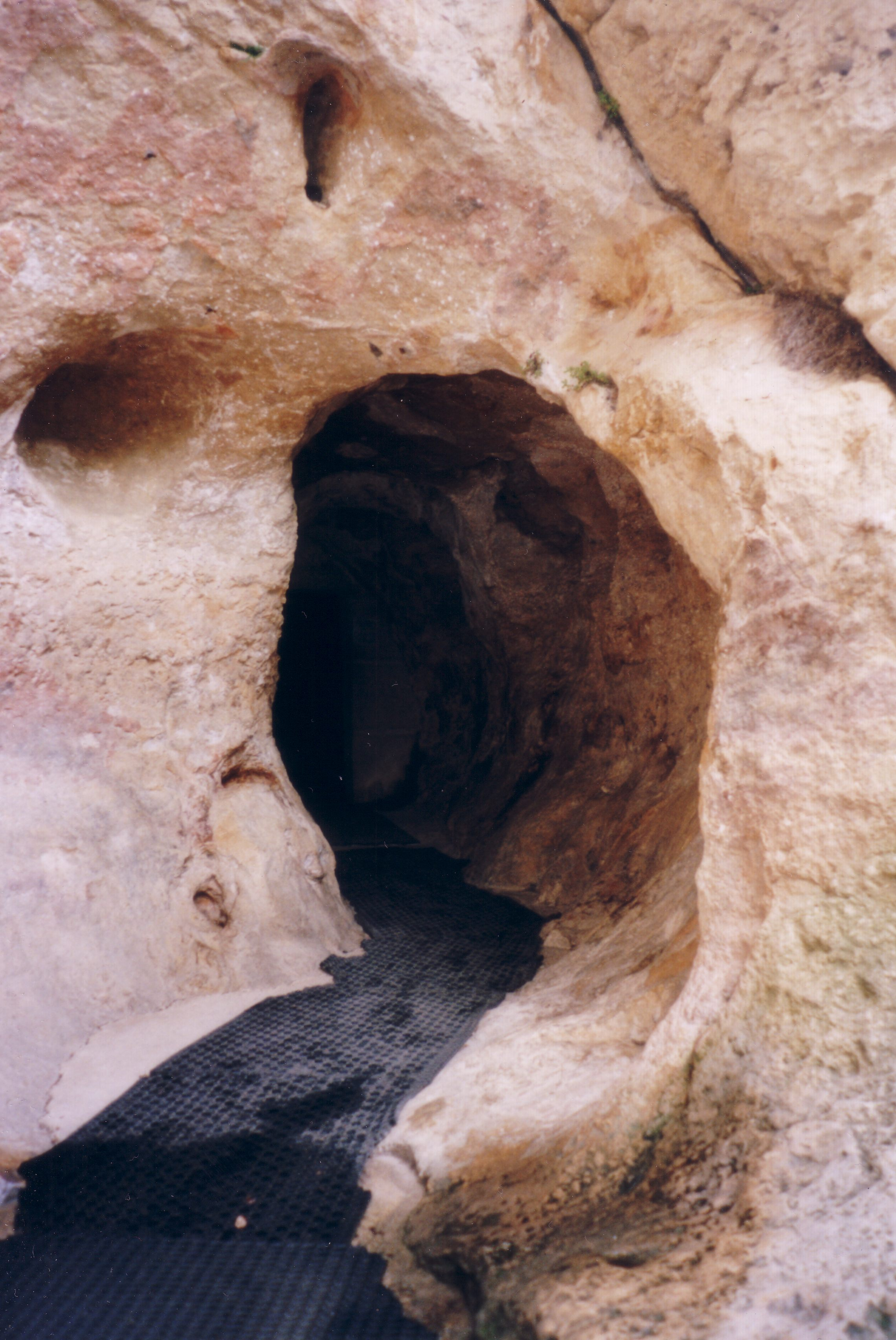
Cave entrance

Font-de-Gaume is a cave near Les Eyzies in the Dordogne department of south-west France. The cave contains prehistoric polychrome cave paintings and engravings dating to the Magdalenian period. Discovered in 1901, more than 200 images have been identified in Font-de-Gaume. Along with other nearby prehistoric archeological sites, Font-de-Gaume was inscribed on the UNESCO World Heritage List in 1979 as the Prehistoric Sites and Decorated Caves of the Vézère Valley.

== History ==
The paintings were discovered by Denis Peyrony, a local schoolmaster, on 12 September 1901. The cave had been known to the general public before this, but the significance of the paintings had not been recognised. Four days earlier Peyrony had visited the cave at Les Combarelles, a short distance away, with the archaeologist Henri Breuil, where he saw its prehistoric engravings. The paintings in the cave at Font-de-Gaume were the first to be discovered in the Périgord province.

Prehistoric people living in the Dordogne Valley first settled in the mouth of Font-de-Gaume around 25,000 BC. The cave mouth was inhabited at least sporadically for the next several thousand years. However, after the original prehistoric inhabitants left, the cave was forgotten until the nineteenth century when local people again began to visit the cave. The paintings date from around 17,000 BC, during the Magdalenian period. Many of the cave's paintings have been discovered in recent decades. The cave's most famous painting, a frieze of five bison, was discovered accidentally in 1966 while scientists were cleaning the cave.

== Present day ==
As of 2007, Font-de-Gaume was the only site in France with polychrome cave paintings that is still open to the public.

To date, 230 figures have been recorded in the cave, and it is thought that more are still to be revealed. Font-de-Gaume holds over 200 polychrome paintings. These engravings are considered the best examples of polychrome painting other than Lascaux, which is now closed to the public. The rock art in Font-de-Gaume includes depictions of more than 80 bison, approximately 40 horses, and more than 20 mammoths.

In March 2026, a multidisciplinary research team led by the French National Centre for Scientific Research (CNRS) published the first absolute radiocarbon dates for Paleolithic cave art in the Dordogne region, specifically within the Font-de-Gaume . Utilizing Raman microspectrometry and hyperspectral imaging, the study identified charcoal traces in black pigments previously characterized as purely mineral, enabling the use of accelerator mass spectrometry for carbon-14 dating. The results indicated that a bison figure was created between 13,461 and 13,162 calBP, while a figure interpreted as a mask yielded multiple dates spanning from approximately 16,000 to 8,500 years ago, suggesting phases of retouching or distinct periods of activity.

== Notable visitors ==
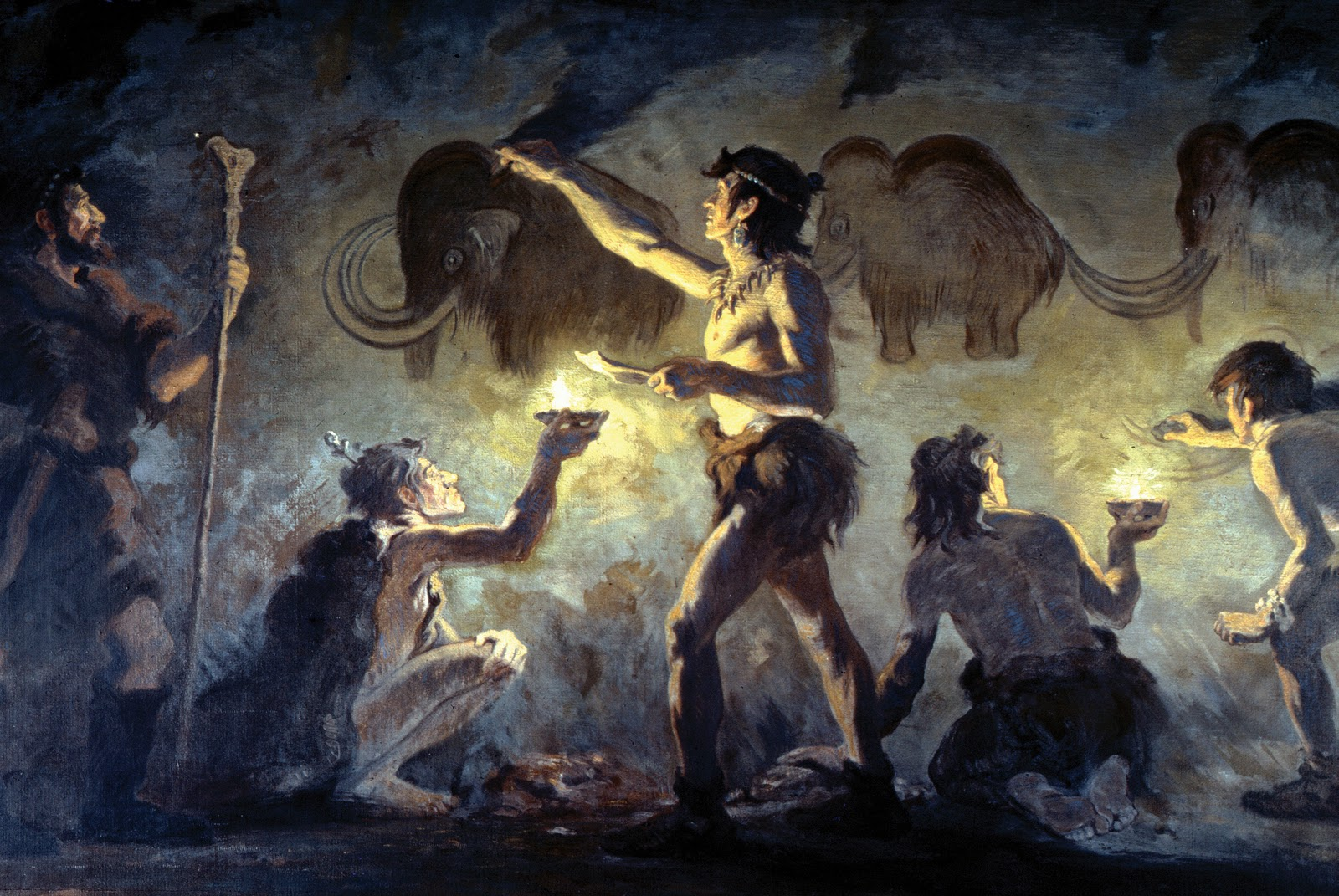
Cro-Magnon artists painting in Font-de-Gaume, by Charles R. Knight

In August 1919, the poet T. S. Eliot visited Périgueux. As part of his walking tour, he explored the then already famous Font-de-Gaume cave.

== Gallery ==
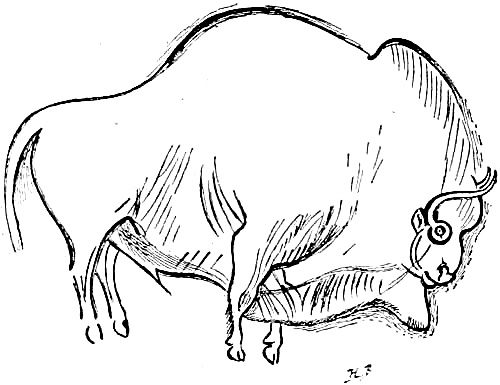
Outline of one of the bison in the Galerie des Fresques at Font-de-Gaume, showing the preliminary etching or engraving preparatory to the polychrome fresco painting. After Breuil.

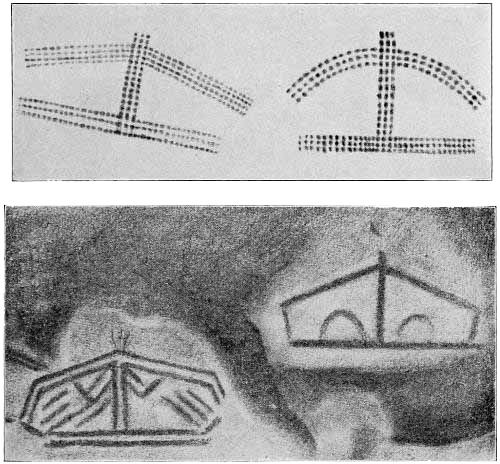
'Tectiforms'—schematic drawings in lines and dots believed to represent huts and larger shelters built of logs and covered with hides. After Breuil.

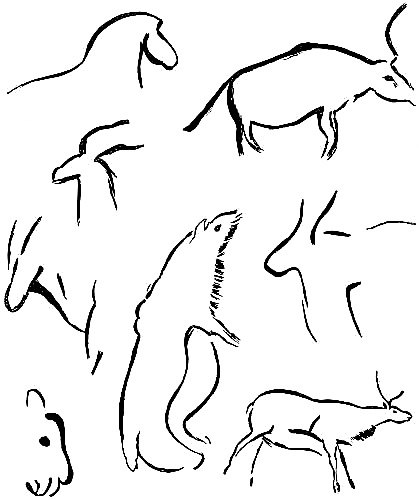
Primitive painted outlines of animals from the cavern walls, attributed by Breuil to the early Aurignacian. The outlines represent the horse, ibex, cave bear, wild cattle, and reindeer. After Breuil.

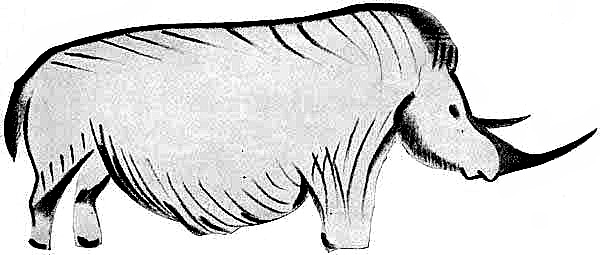
The woolly rhinoceros, painted in red ochre with shading and partial representation of the hair. Attributed by Breuil to the late Aurignacian. Possibly Magdalenian. After Breuil.

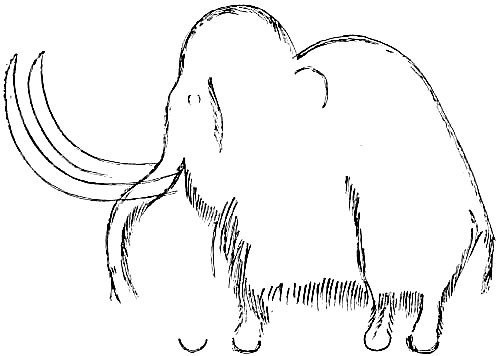
Engraved outlines and hair underlying the painting of one of the mammoths, from the wall of the Galerie des Fresques. After Breuil.

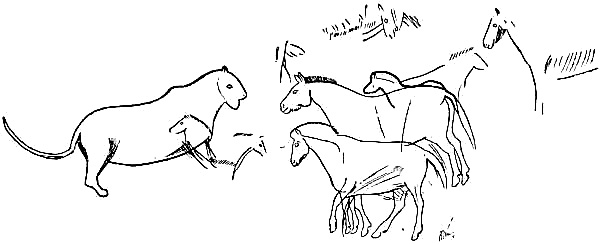
Outlines of a lioness and a small group of horses of the Celtic or Arab type, a delicate wall engraving in the Diverticule final of the cavern of Font-de-Gaume. After Breuil.

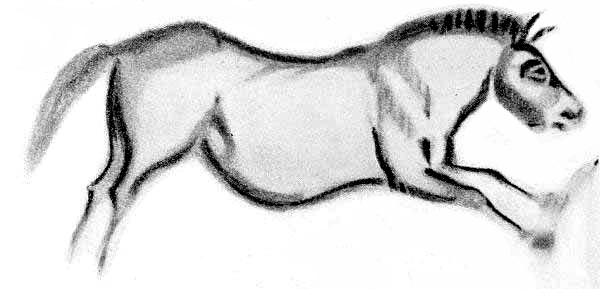
Galloping horse of the Celtic or of the steppe type painted in black and white. After Breuil.

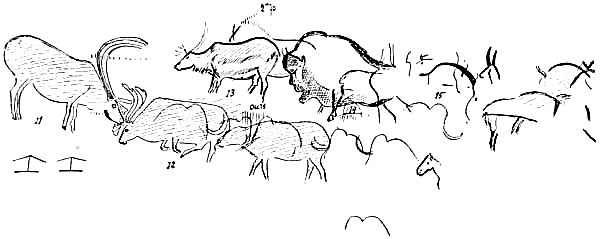
Plan of a portion of the left wall decoration in the Galerie des Fresques, showing reindeer and the procession of bison. After Breuil.

== See also ==
- List of Stone Age art
- Art of the Upper Paleolithic
