= Rouffignac-Saint-Cernin-de-Reilhac =

- Commune
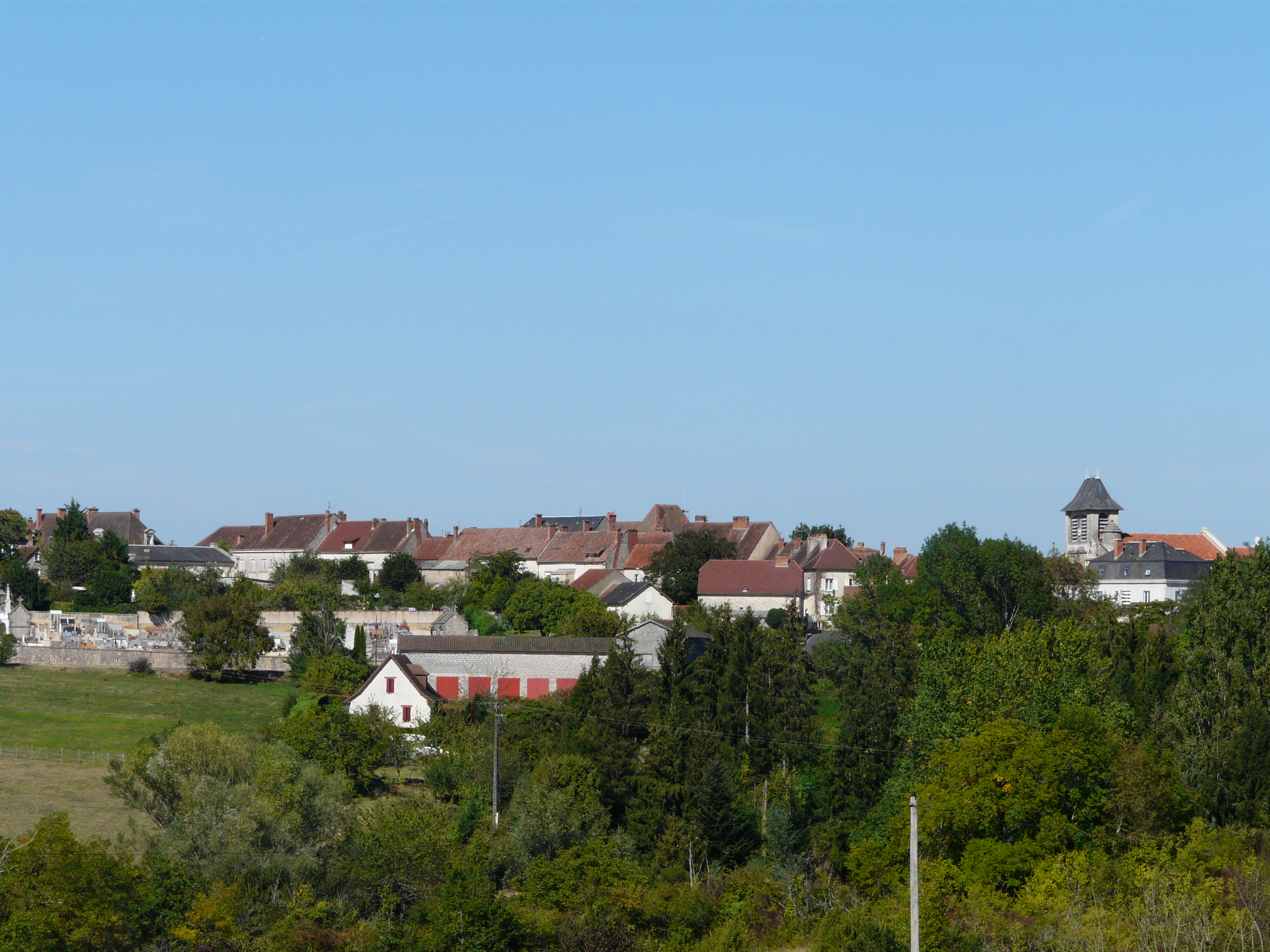
- A general view of Rouffignac-Saint-Cernin

- Coat of arms
- Location of Rouffignac-Saint-Cernin-de-Reilhac
- Location within France Location within Nouvelle-Aquitaine
- Coordinates: 45°02′55″N 0°58′12″E
- Country: France
- Region: Nouvelle-Aquitaine
- Department: Dordogne
- Arrondissement: Sarlat-la-Canéda
- Canton: Vallée de l'Homme

Government
  - Mayor (2020–2026): Raymond Marty
- Area^{1}: 59.90 km^{2} (23.13 sq mi)
- Elevation: 280 m (920 ft)
- Highest elevation: 304 m (997 ft)
- Lowest elevation: 116 m (381 ft)
- Population (2023): 1,678
  - Density: 28.01/km^{2} (72.55/sq mi)
- Time zone: UTC+01:00 (CET)
  - Summer (DST): UTC+02:00 (CEST)
- INSEE/Postal code: 24356 /24580
- ^{1} French Land Register data, which excludes lakes, ponds, glaciers > 1 km^{2} (0.386 sq mi or 247 acres) and river estuaries.

Rouffignac-Saint-Cernin-de-Reilhac (French pronunciation: [ʁufiɲak sɛ̃ sɛʁnɛ̃ də ʁɛjak]; Occitan: Rofinhac e Sent Sarnin de Relhac) is a commune in the Dordogne department in Nouvelle-Aquitaine in southwestern France.

== Geography ==
Surrounded by rolling hills and agricultural land uses, Rouffignac's nearest communities are the municipalities of Fleurac, St. Geyrac and Saint-Félix-de-Reillac-and-Mortemarts. Montignac is 15 km east. It is located 25 miles southeast of the city of Périgueux. Two tributaries of the Vézère, the Manaurie and the Vimont, run close by.

== History ==
The Château de l'Herm nearby dates from the 16th century, and construction began in the 15th. It was later abandoned, and Eugène Le Roy used it as a setting in his novel Jacquou le Croquant. The church of Saint-Germain-de-Paris is built in a roman style and has a gothic interior. It was classified as a national monument in 1900. A second church is L'église Saint-Saturnin de Saint-Cernin-de-Reillac.

On 1 January 1973, the communes of Saint-Cernin-de-Reillac and Rouffignac merged.

The town has few historic buildings as it was destroyed by the Germans in March 1944, the only remaining buildings being the church and the house adjacent. The destruction was caused because two German officers of the Brehmer Division were captured by the French Resistance during World War II. The captives were not harmed but escaped and returned to the town for retribution. No one was killed during the destruction but a rape was reported and many private families had all their possessions stolen by the German army. The destruction became widely known in France and was portrayed as Nazi barbarism.

== Rouffignac today ==
These days the town is an attractive destination. The Rouffignac Cave is an important tourist site, running many miles deep, and served by an electric underground train. It contains prehistoric cave paintings of woolly mammoths and other animals.

== Population ==
Historical population
Year	Pop.	±% p.a.
1968	1,571	—
1975	1,474	−0.91%
1982	1,429	−0.44%
1990	1,465	+0.31%
1999	1,484	+0.14%
2007	1,542	+0.48%
2012	1,574	+0.41%
2017	1,603	+0.37%
2023	1,678	+0.77%
Source: INSEE

== See also ==
- Communes of the Dordogne department
