= Cro-Magnon rock shelter =

Cave and archaeological site in France

- Abri de Cro-Magnon (French)
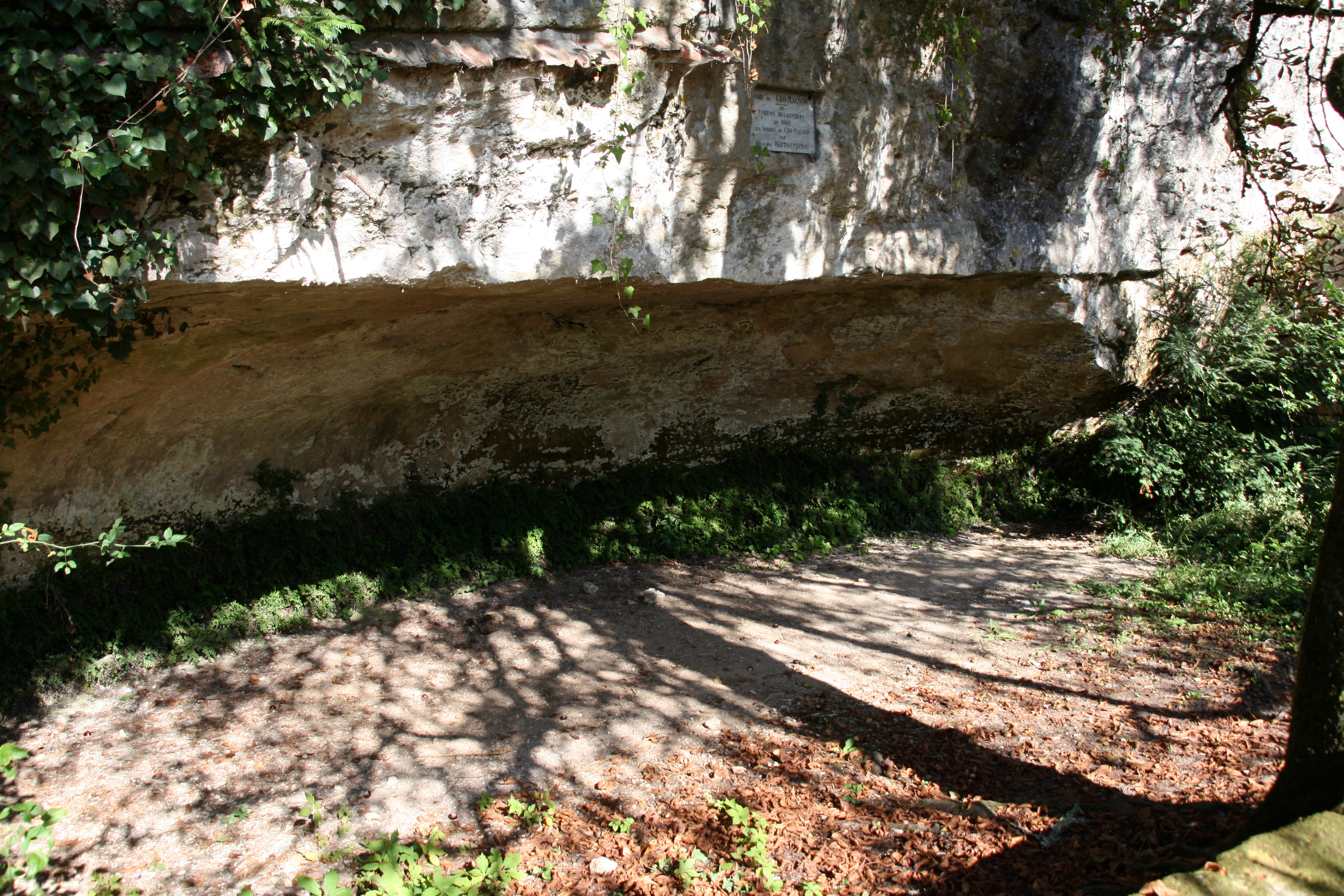
- Cro-Magnon rock shelter; a commemorative marble plaque to the right of the image's center-top reads, "Abri de Cro-Magnon: ici furent découverts en 1868 les hommes de Cro-Magnon par François Berthoumeyrou" ("Shelter of Cro-Magnon: Here in 1868 Cro-Magnon men were discovered by François Berthoumeyrou")

- Location within France
- Interactive map of Cro-Magnon rock shelter
- 44°56′25″N 01°00′35″E
- Type: Rock shelter
- Periods: Aurignacian
- Associated with: Cro-Magnons
- Location: Les Eyzies, Dordogne
- Region: Nouvelle-Aquitaine; France
- Part of: European early modern human sites

History
- Built: ~27,680 ± 270 BP

Site notes
- Material: Human remains, animal bones, flint tools
- Elevation: 73.0 m (239.5 ft)
- Excavation dates: 1868+
- Archaeologists: Louis Lartet
- Public access: Yes
- Website: Official website

UNESCO World Heritage Site
- Type: Cultural
- Criteria: i, iii
- Designated: 1979 (3rd session)
- Part of: Prehistoric Sites and Decorated Caves of the Vézère Valley
- Reference no.: 85

Cro-Magnon (/kroʊˈmænjɒn/ kroh-MAN-yon or /kroʊˈmæɡnən/ kroh-MAG-nən; French: abri de Cro-Magnon [abʁi d(ə) kʁomaɲɔ̃]; Occitan: abric de Cròsmanhon) (Note: French abri means 'rock shelter', Occitan cròs, means 'hole' (standard French creux), and Magnon is the surname of the land owner at the time.) is an Aurignacian (Upper Paleolithic) site, located in a rock shelter in the commune of Les Eyzies, Dordogne, southwestern France.

Most notably, it is the site of the discovery of anatomically modern human remains, apparently buried at the site, dated to about 28,000 years ago. The find is also called Cro-Magnon after the name of the rock shelter. Because of its archeological importance, Abri de Cro-Magnon was inscribed on the UNESCO World Heritage List as part of the Prehistoric Sites and Decorated Caves of the Vézère Valley site.

== Human remains ==
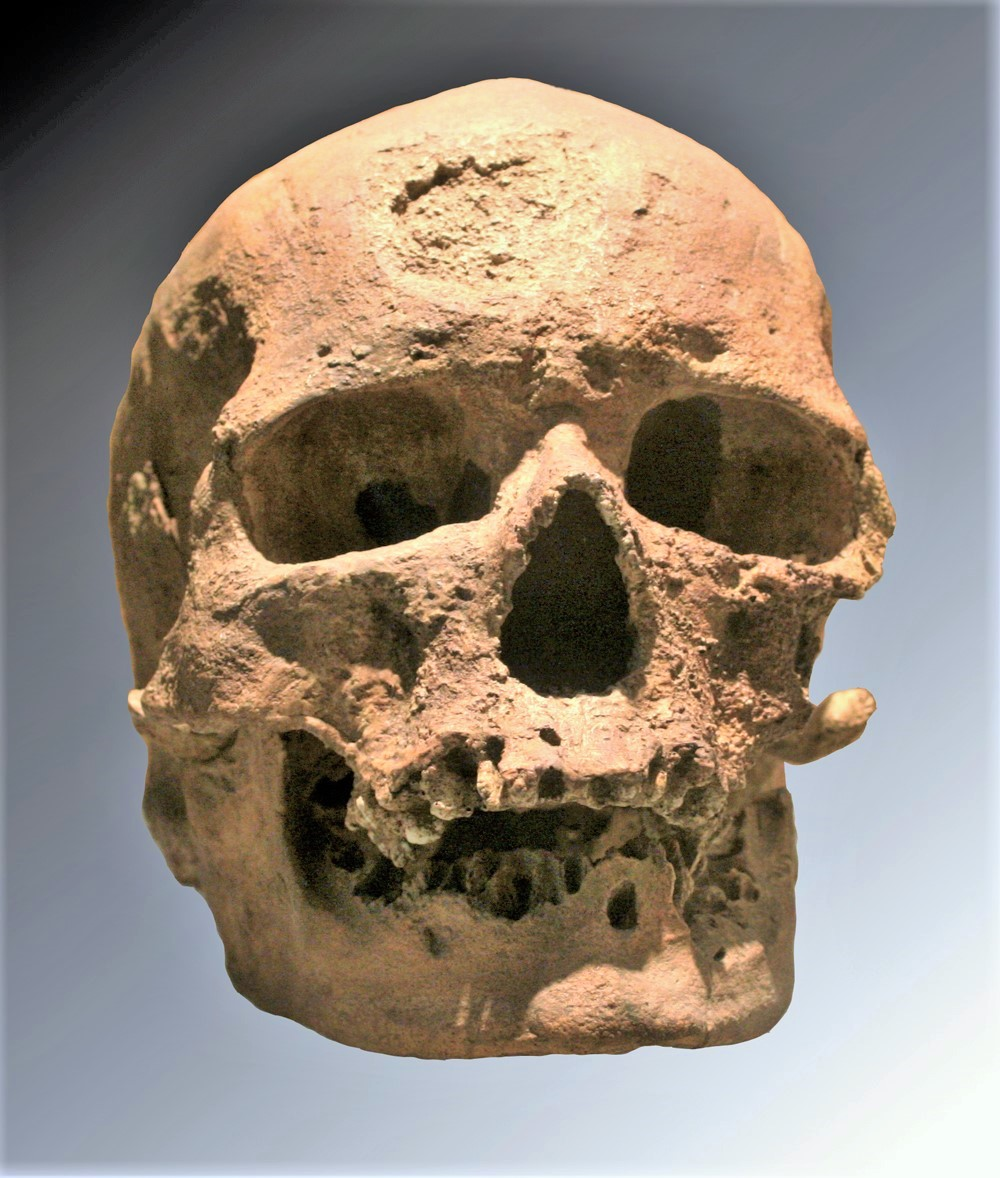
Cro-Magnon 1 (Musée de l'Homme, Paris)

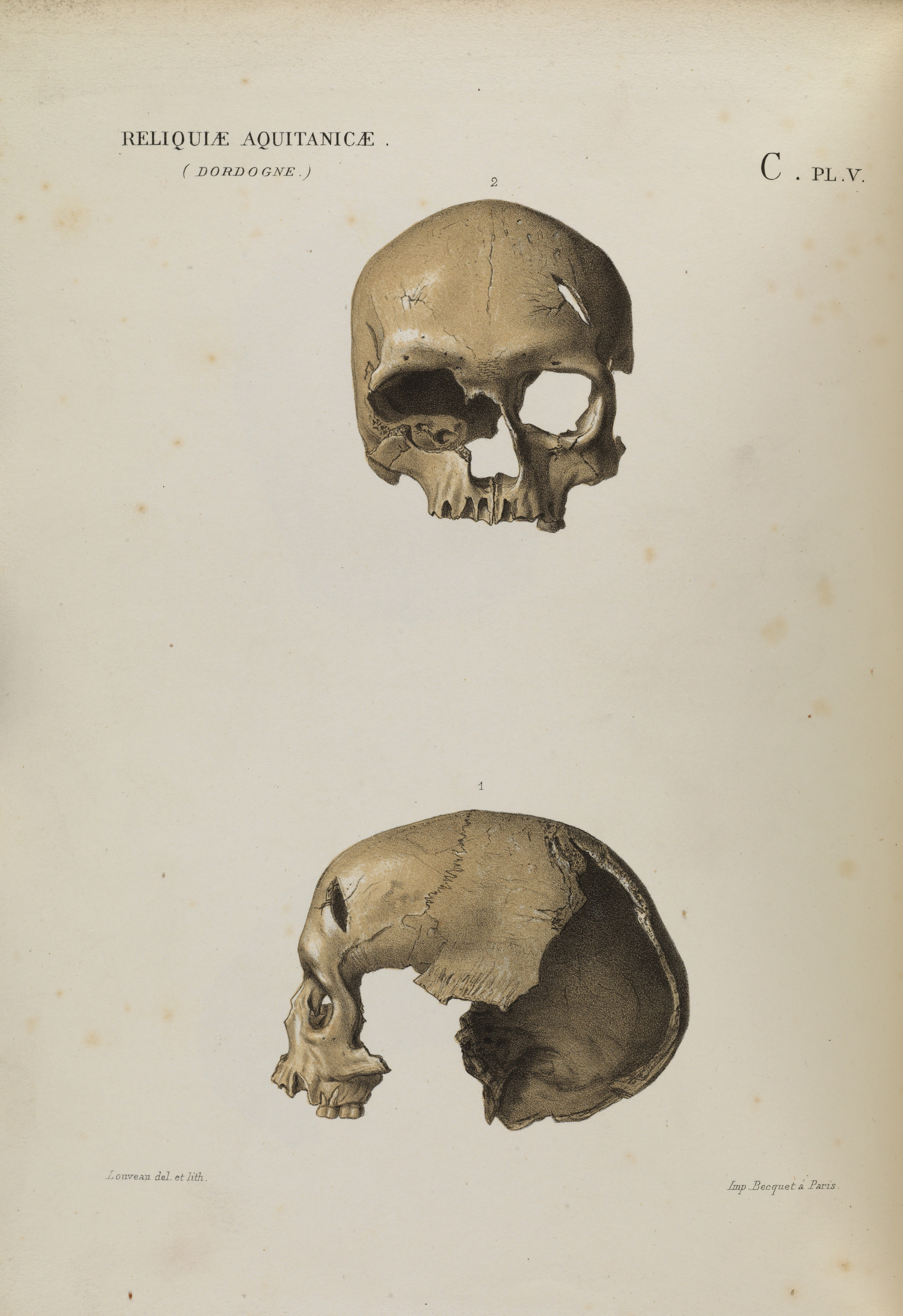
Two views of Cro-Magnon 2 (1875)

In 1868, workmen found animal bones, flint tools, and human skulls in the rock shelter. French geologist Louis Lartet was called for excavations, and found the partial skeletons of four prehistoric adults and one infant, along with perforated shells used as ornaments, an object made from ivory, and worked reindeer antler.

These "Cro-Magnon men" were identified as the prehistoric human species of Europe, as distinct from Neanderthal Man, described a few years earlier by William King based on the Neanderthal 1 fossil discovered in Germany in 1856. Lartet proposed the subspecies name Homo sapiens fossilis in 1869. The term "Cro-Magnon Man" soon came to be used in a general sense to describe the oldest modern people in Europe. By the 1970s, the term was used for any early modern human wherever found, as was the case with the far-flung Jebel Qafzeh remains in Israel and various Paleo-Indians in the Americas.

Cro-Magnon 1 consists of a skull and partial skeletal remains belonging to a male individual, approximately 40 years old. It is dated to 27,680 ± 270 Before Present (BP). The cranial cavity measures 1,600 cubic centimetres (98 cu in). The capacity of a modern adult anatomically modern human's cranial cavity is 1,200 to 1,700 cubic centimetres (73 to 104 cu in).

Cro-Magnon 2 is a partially preserved female skull with marked facial similarities to Mladeč 2.

Cro-Magnon 3 is a partial skull of a male adult.

The remains are thought to represent adults who died at an advanced age, who were placed at the site, along with pieces of shell and animal teeth in what appear to have been pendants or necklaces, in an apparent intentional burial. The presence of necklaces and tools suggests the concept of grave goods.

Analysis of the pathology of the skeletons shows that the humans of this period led a physically difficult life. In addition to infection, several of the individuals found at the shelter had fused vertebrae in their necks, indicating traumatic injury; the adult female found at the shelter had survived for some time with a skull fracture. As these injuries would be life-threatening even today, this suggests that Cro-Magnons relied on community support and took care of each other's injuries. In addition, Cro-Magnon 1 suffered from a genetic condition called Neurofibromatosis type I, which would have led him to have large cysts or tumours on his face, evident in the depression in the frontal bone and pits of the eyebrows and cheek bones.

Compared to Neanderthals, the skeletons showed the same high forehead, upright posture and slender (gracile) skeleton as modern humans. The other specimens from the site are a female, Cro-Magnon 2, and male remains, Cro-Magnon 3.

== See also ==
- Archaic human admixture with modern humans
- List of human evolution fossils
- Neanderthal extinction
- Peopling of Europe
