= Cap Blanc rock shelter =

Cave with prehistoric art in France

- Abri de Cap Blanc
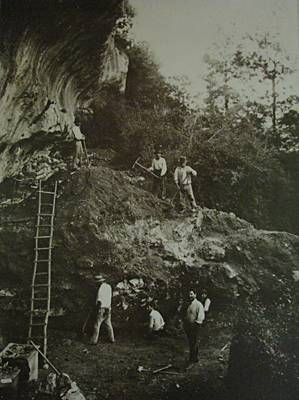
- Excavations 1911

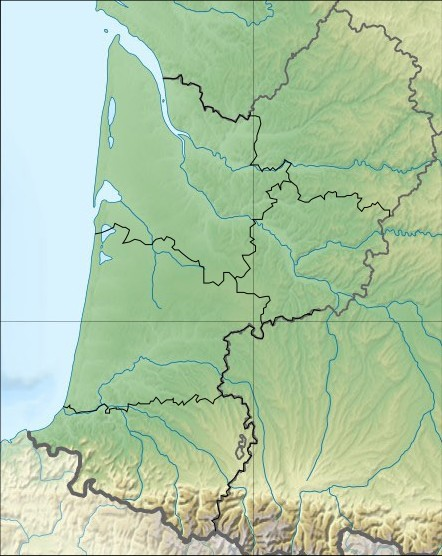
- Location in France Cap Blanc rock shelter (France)
- 44°56′44″N 1°5′49″E
- Cultures: Magdalenian
- Location: near Les Eyzies, Marquay commune
- Region: Dordogne

Site notes
- Excavation dates: 1909,
- Archaeologists: Raymond Peyrille

UNESCO World Heritage Site
- Official name: Le Cap Blanc
- Part of: Prehistoric Sites and Decorated Caves of the Vézère Valley
- Criteria: Cultural: (i), (iii)
- Reference: 85-010
- Inscription: 1979 (3rd Session)
- Area: 1.808 ha (194,600 sq ft)

The abri de Cap Blanc is a prehistoric limestone rock shelter with Magdalenian animal sculptures. It is in the Marquay commune on the right bank of the Beune River, a few kilometers west of Les Eyzies, in Dordogne.

== History ==
The site was discovered in 1908 by Raymond Peyrille under the supervision of Jean-Gaston Lalanne. Peyrille carried out its first rudimentary excavation in 1909 while Lalanne was working at the nearby site of Laussel. During this excavation a relief carving was found, one that has been described as "perhaps the most dramatic and impressive example of Upper Palaeolithic".

Following the discovery of the frieze, work was undertaken in 1911 to build a protective wall around the shelter. This included lowering the shelter floor, a procedure during which a workman hit a skull with a pick-axe, breaking it. A relatively complete skeleton was uncovered and Denis Peyrony and Louis Capitan were brought in to examine it.

== Frieze ==
The frieze depicts a number of animals, some in haut-relief, dating back 15,000 years. These include ten horses (one measuring 2.20 m long), at least three bison, ibex and several incomplete figures.

The sculpted frieze occupies 13 of the 16 meters of the shelter. Some of the carving is as much as 30 cm deep. Red ochre covers much of the frieze and some of the area around it is now difficult to see. Among other flint tools probably used to create the frieze were found Magdalenian burins and scrapers.

== Magdalenian Girl ==
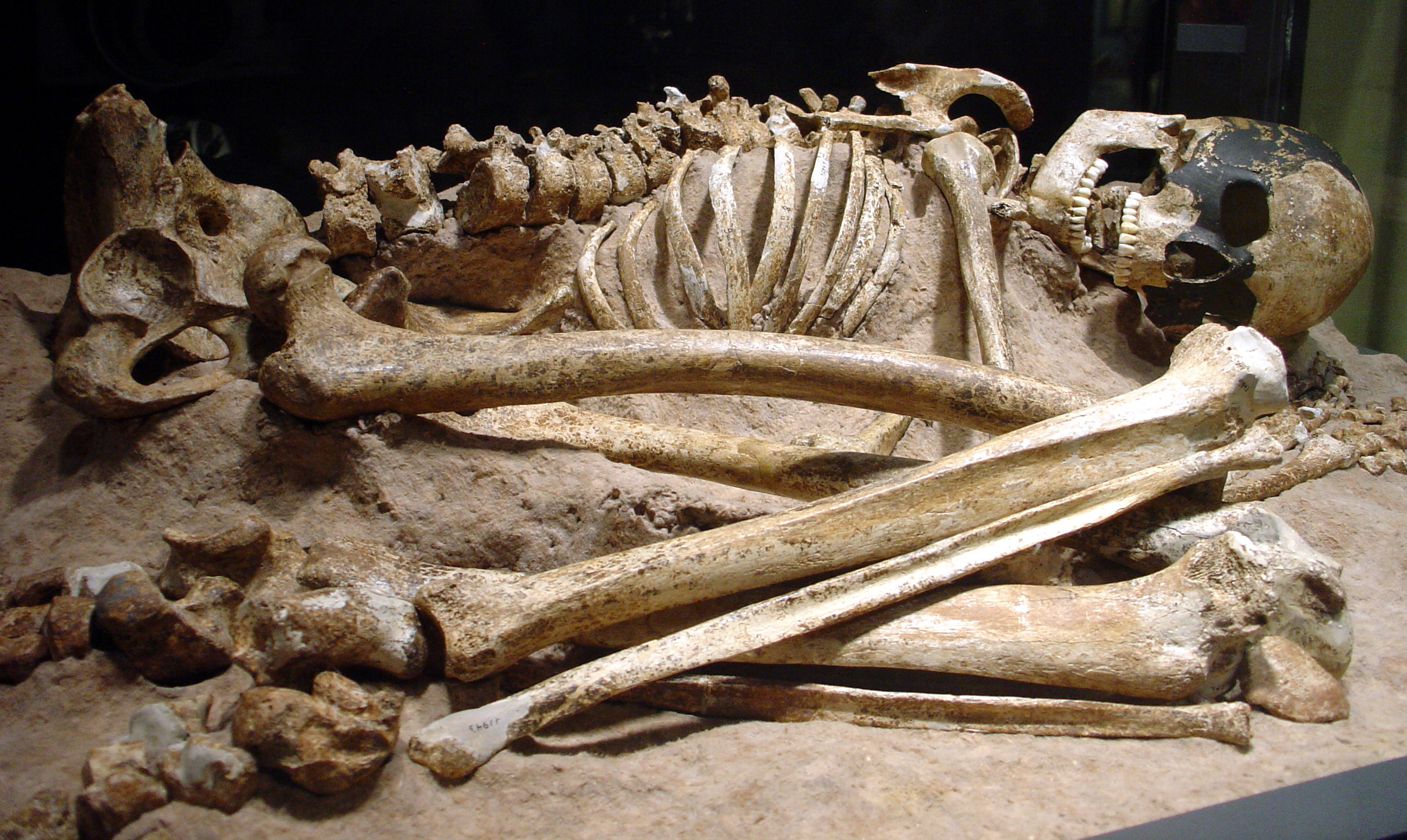
modern human skeleton of the Magdalenian cultural era, Cap Blanc rock shelter

The skeleton known as Magdalenian Girl (or sometimes Magdalenian Woman) is that of an early modern human dating from 13,000 to 11,000 BCE during the Magdalenian period. It is the most complete Upper Paleolithic skeleton in Northern Europe. When Magdalenian Girl was acquired in 1926 for the Field Museum in Chicago, Illinois, by Henry Field, then curator of Physical Anthropology, it was hailed as one of the most significant acquisitions the museum ever made. On the first day the precious specimen was exhibited, tens of thousands of visitors flocked to the museum to see it.

The skeleton is thought to have been likely buried deliberately. Paul Pettitt noted that "Large stone blocks were found over her head and feet, although no cultural items were recovered with the skeleton".

== Preservation and visits ==
The site was classified as a French historical monument in 1910, and registered as a World Heritage Site by UNESCO in 1979 as part of the Prehistoric Sites and Decorated Caves of the Vézère Valley. It was acquired by the French government on 14 April 2006.

Guided tours take place during the year and there is an on-site museum which includes a replica of Magdalenian Girl.

== See also ==
- Art of the Upper Paleolithic
- Cave of Altamira
- Cave painting
- Lascaux
- List of archaeological sites by country
- List of caves
- List of Stone Age art
- Prehistoric art
