= Les Combarelles =

Cave with prehistoric art

Les Combarelles cave
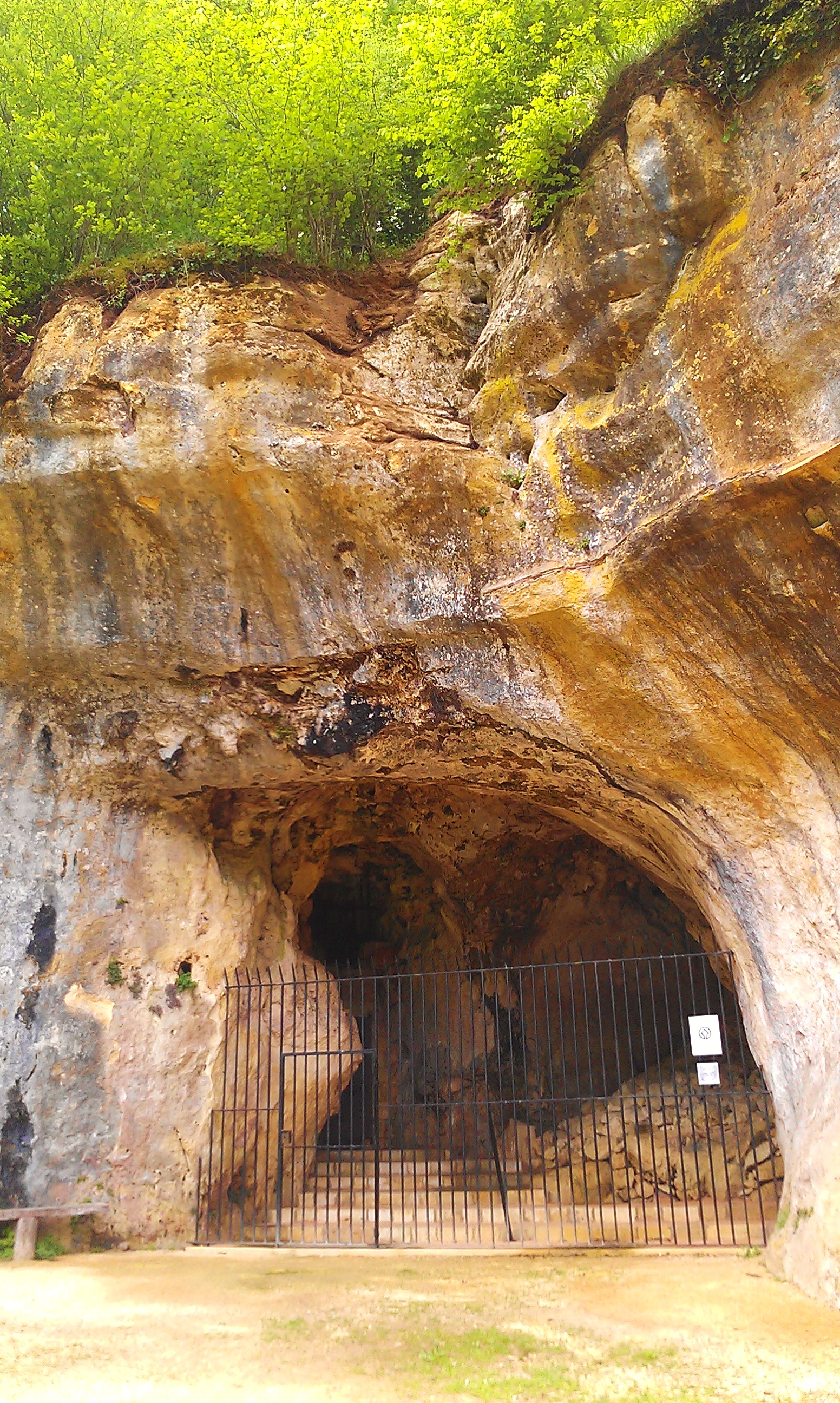
- Entrance to Les Combarelles cave

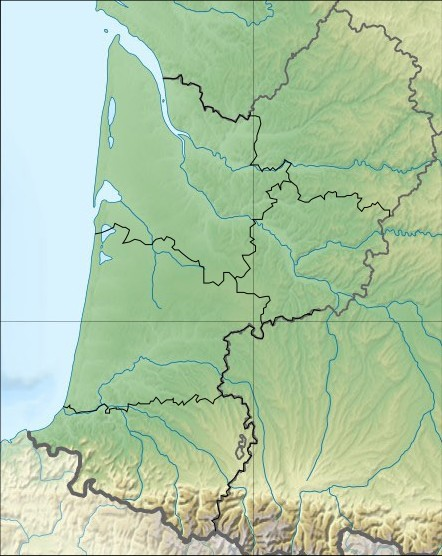
- Location in France Les Combarelles (France)
- 44°56′37″N 1°2′32″E
- Cultures: Magdalenian
- Location: near Eyzies-de-Tayac,
- Region: Dordogne, France

Site notes
- Excavation dates: 1909,
- Archaeologists: Émile River

UNESCO World Heritage Site
- Part of: Prehistoric Sites and Decorated Caves of the Vézère Valley
- Criteria: Cultural: (i), (iii)
- Reference: 85-009
- Inscription: 1979 (3rd Session)
- Area: 4.095 ha (440,800 sq ft)

Les Combarelles is a cave in Les Eyzies de Tayac, Dordogne, France, which was inhabited by Cro-Magnon people between approximately 13,000 to 11,000 years ago. Holding more than 600 prehistoric engravings of animals and symbols, the two galleries in the cave were crucial in the re-evaluation of the mental and technical capabilities of these prehistoric humans around the turn of the 20th century. In 1979, along with other nearby paleolithic sites and cave paintings, the cave was inscribed on the UNESCO World Heritage List as part of the Prehistoric Sites and Decorated Caves of the Vézère Valley.

Formed by an underground river, the cave is approximately 300 m (980 ft) long with an average width of 1 m (3.3 ft).

== Discovery ==
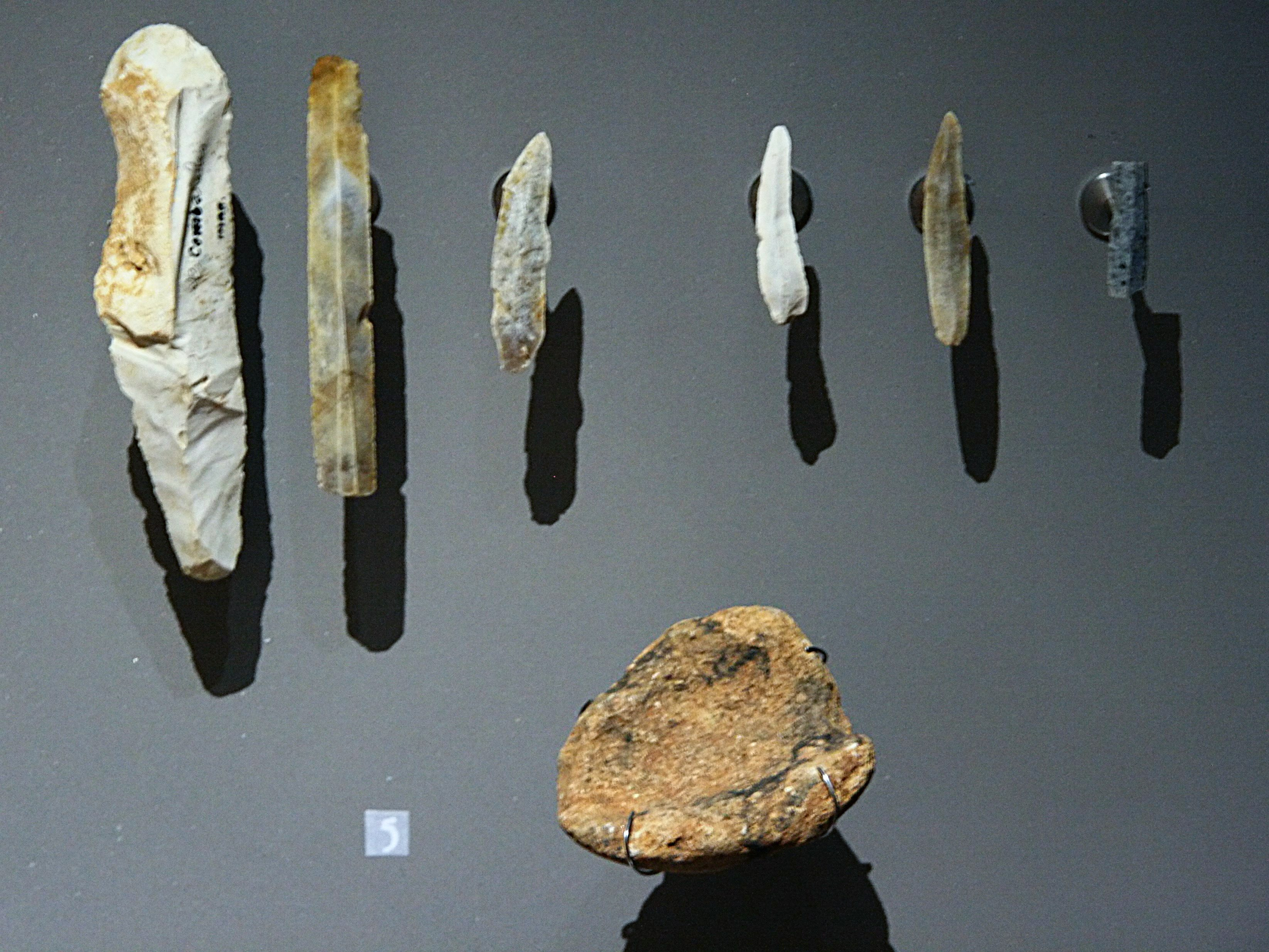
Stone tools found in the cave

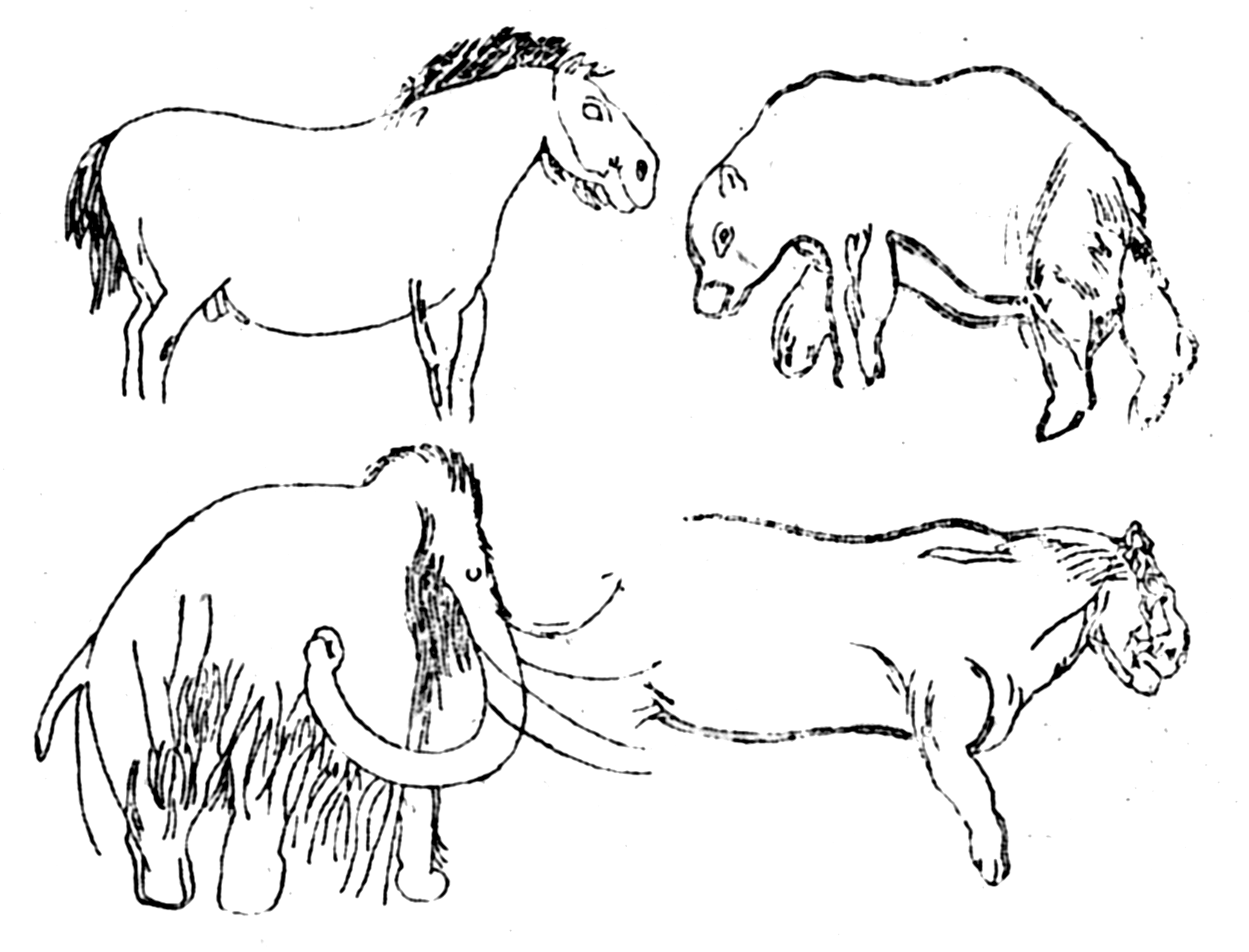
Drawings of a wild horse, a bear, a mammoth, and a cave lion

Long used as a stable by local peasants who regularly found Magdalenian artifacts in the cave, the cave and its content remained unstudied by scientists for a long period. It was officially discovered in September 1901 by pre-historians Denis Peyrony, Abbé Breuil, and Louis Capitan. The entrance of the cave and the right-hand gallery had already been excavated by Émile River between 1891 and 1894. Abbé Breuil described 291 drawings divided into 105 separate sets — a discovery he himself called an "enormous firecracker in the world of prehistory".

== Human presence ==
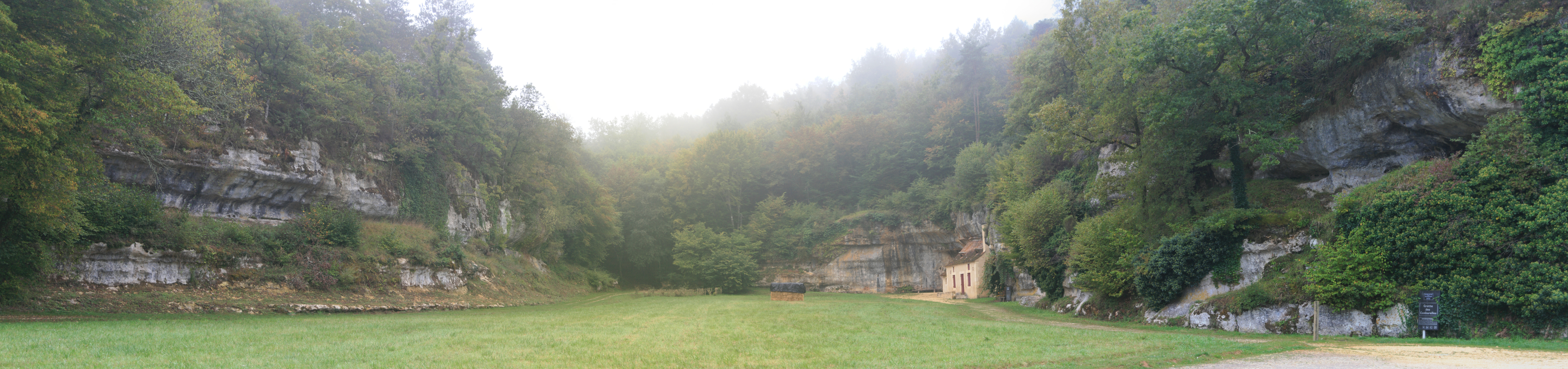
The valley of Les Combarelles

Radiocarbon dating of bones found in the cave indicate the cave was inhabited by Cro-Magnon people 13,680–11,380 years ago. During that period, these people produced hundreds of drawings on the sandy cave walls, traces of dye suggesting the engraved drawings were originally coloured.

Scientists have identified 600–800 drawings of isolated animals and undecipherable tectiforms (i.e. upward-pointing wedges) in the cave. Horses appear most frequently in these drawings — isolated, in herds, and together with other animals — but the reindeer are famous for their naturalistic appearances — some of them drawn as if drinking water from the river flowing through the cave. Other animals include cave bears, cave lions, and mammoths.

== See also ==
- List of Stone Age art
- Art of the Upper Paleolithic
