= Frederick Christy =

English cricketer and inventor

Personal information
- Full name: Frederick Collier Christy
- Born: 8 September 1822; Aperfield, Kent, England
- Died: 17 January 1909 (aged 86); South Yarra, Victoria, Australia
- Batting: Unknown
- Relatives: Alfred Christy (brother)

Career statistics
| Competition | First-class |
|---|---|
| Matches | 3 |
| Runs scored | 5 |
| Batting average | 0.83 |
| 100s/50s | –/– |
| Top score | 5 |
| Balls bowled | 0 |
| Wickets | – |
| Bowling average | – |
| 5 wickets in innings | – |
| 10 wickets in match | – |
| Best bowling | – |
| Catches/stumpings | -/- |
- Source: Cricinfo, 23 December 2018

Frederick Collier Christy (9 September 1822 – 17 September 1909) was an English first-class cricketer and inventor.

A son of John Christy and his wife Sarah De Horne, Christy was born at Aperfield in Kent in September 1822, into a Quaker family with substantial business interests. He was a nephew of businessman William Miller Christy and therefore a first cousin of banker and collector Henry Christy; another first cousin was Samuel Christy-Miller MP.

He was employed by J. and G. Rennie for a time in 1845. The following year he made his debut in first-class cricket for the Surrey Club against Marylebone Cricket Club at Lord's. He made a further first-class appearance for the Surrey Club in 1848 in a repeat of the 1846 match. His older brother Alfred would later also play cricket for Surrey.

By 1858 he had emigrated to Victoria, where he worked for the Victorian Railways as a chief mechanical engineer. He married Caroline Smith Wells at Williamstown in 1861. H. H. Stephenson toured Australia with a team the following year. A first-class match was arranged between a Surrey XI and The Rest of the World at the Melbourne Cricket Ground, with Christy playing for the Surrey XI.

In 1869, he sent a patent request to the Patent Office in London for his invention of "improvements in the construction of axle-boxes for railway carriages and other vehicles." He moved to Japan in April 1871 to work for the Japanese Government Railways as a locomotive superintendent, in what was its first year of operation. He worked in Japan for five years, returning to Australia in 1876. He died at South Yarra in September 1909.
