= Baton fragment (Palart 310) =

Paleolithic artefact from Dordogne, France

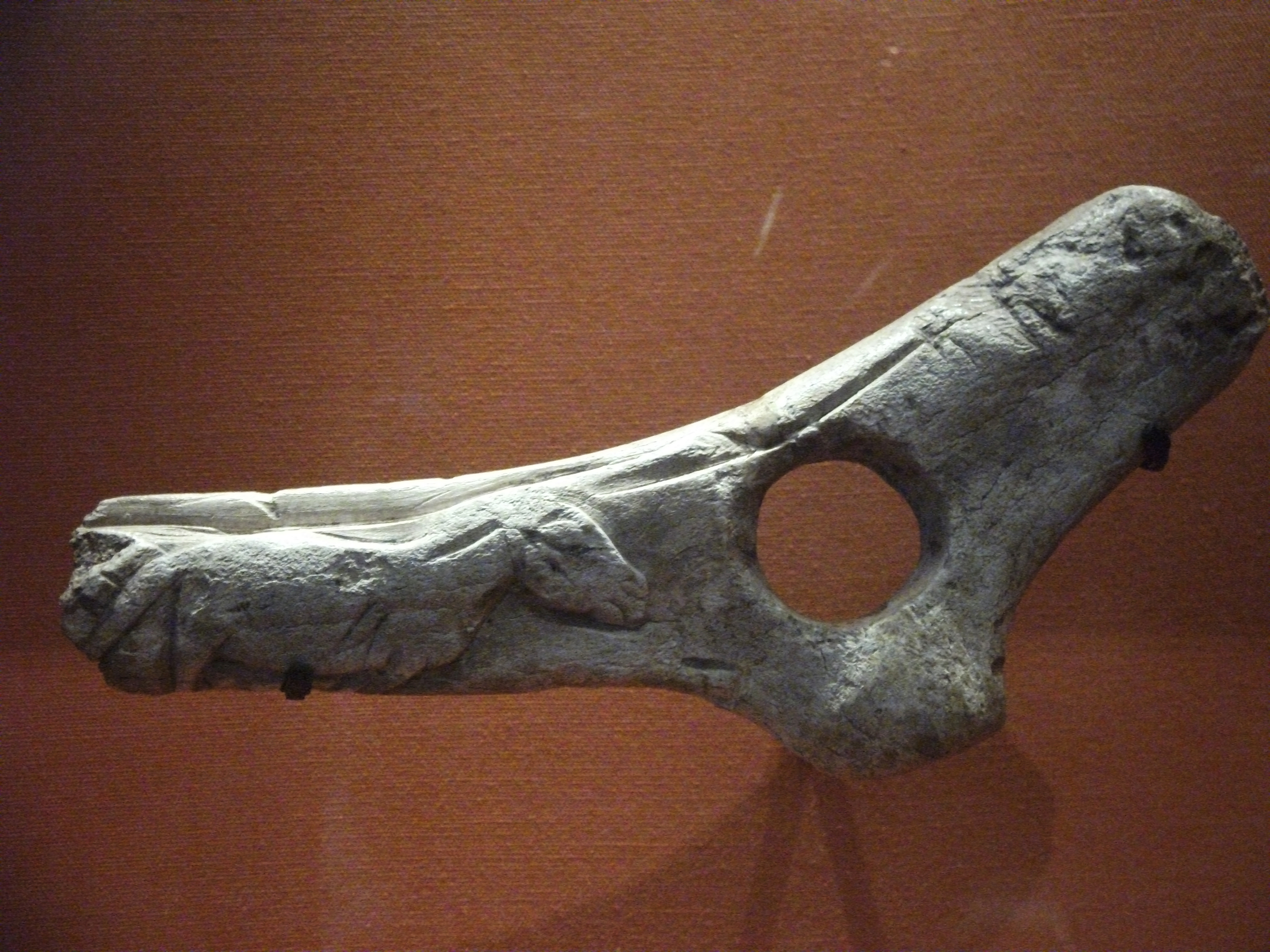
- Perforated baton with low relief horse
- Material: Antler
- Size: Length: 16.6 cm Width: 5.5 cm
- Created: 17,000 to 12,000 years ago
- Discovered: 1863; Tursac, Dordogne, France
- Discovered by: Edouard Lartet and Henry Christy
- Registration: Palart 310

An example of the art of the Upper Paleolithic in the Last Glacial Period, this decorated fragment of a perforated antler baton was discovered in 1863 by Edouard Lartet and Henry Christy at the Abri de la Madeleine, an overhanging cliff situated near Tursac, in the Dordogne département and the Aquitaine Région of South-Western France. This is the type-site for the Magdalenian culture, currently dated to around 17,000 to 12,000 years ago. It was bequeathed to the British Museum by Christy, and is now catalogued as Palart 310, but not normally on display (see below for past exhibitions).

The baton is 16.6 cm long, 5.5 cm wide and 3 cm thick. The fragment is broken at both ends and is distinguished by a near-cylindrical section, which is interrupted on one side by a horse motif, and on the other side by three deeply cut grooves. The baton has one perforated hole in the near centre, with a deep groove above it, which runs long ways just below the upper edge. Directly to the left of the perforated hole is an image of a horse; this faces to the right, and appears in low-relief. The figure has a large eye, a high angular shaped mane, and small forelegs that seem to sweep backwards. There are two incised V shapes on its flank that might suggest injury or movement.

The occurrence of a large eye is a feature found on other baton examples excavated at La Madeleine.

== Function ==
This decorated antler baton was used in the manufacture and throwing of spears. The hole is a gauge to shape the shaft of the spear. It can also be used to straighten both the tips and the shafts. By looping a strip of raw hide through the hole the tool becomes a weapon. Looping the thong around the end of the spear, turns the baton into a spear thrower. The object represents both a decorated tool and weapon; carrying kit that serves more than one function has immediate advantages when one is on the move.

== Exhibitions ==
- April to June 2010 – 'Ice Age Sculpture' at the Henry Moore Institute, Leeds.
- May to July 2006 – 'Undercover Surrealism' at Hayward Gallery, London.
- February to May 2013 – exhibition at the British Museum Ice Age Art: Arrival of the Modern Mind

== See also ==
- Art of the Upper Paleolithic
- List of Stone Age art
