= Perforated baton =

Prehistoric antler artefact

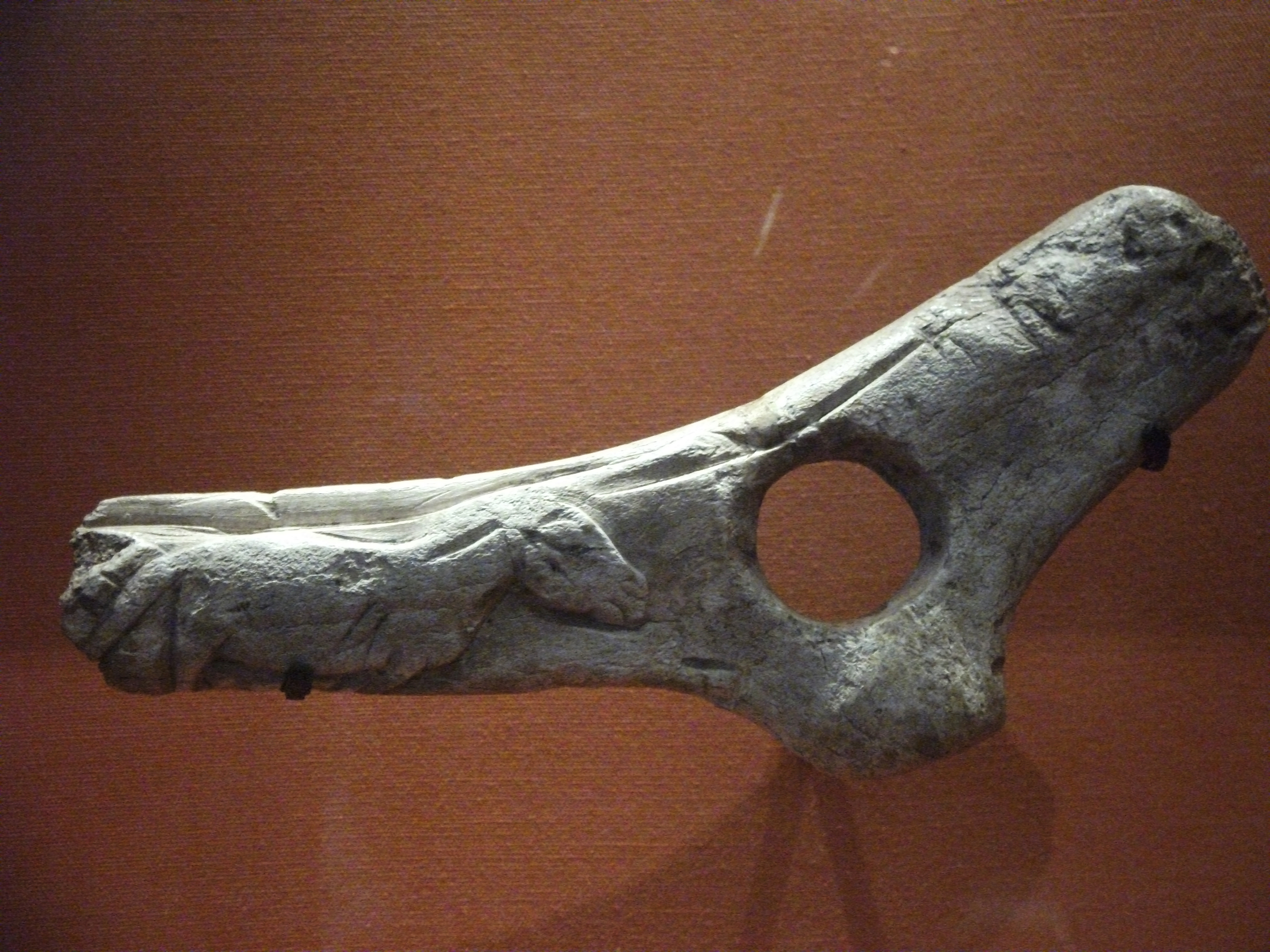
Incomplete perforated baton with low relief horse, from Abri de la Madeleine

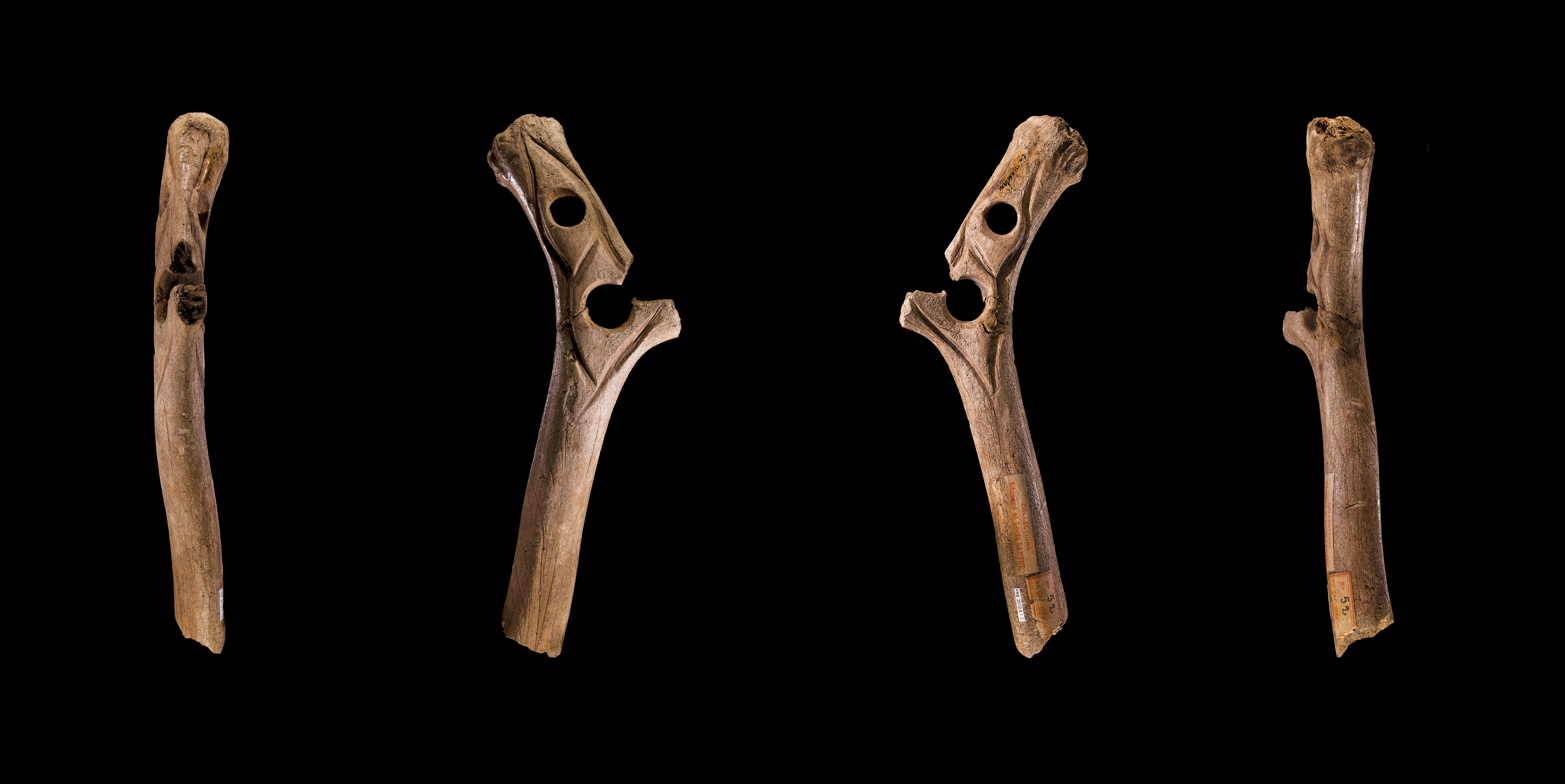
Four views of another baton from Abri de la Madeleine, now in Toulouse

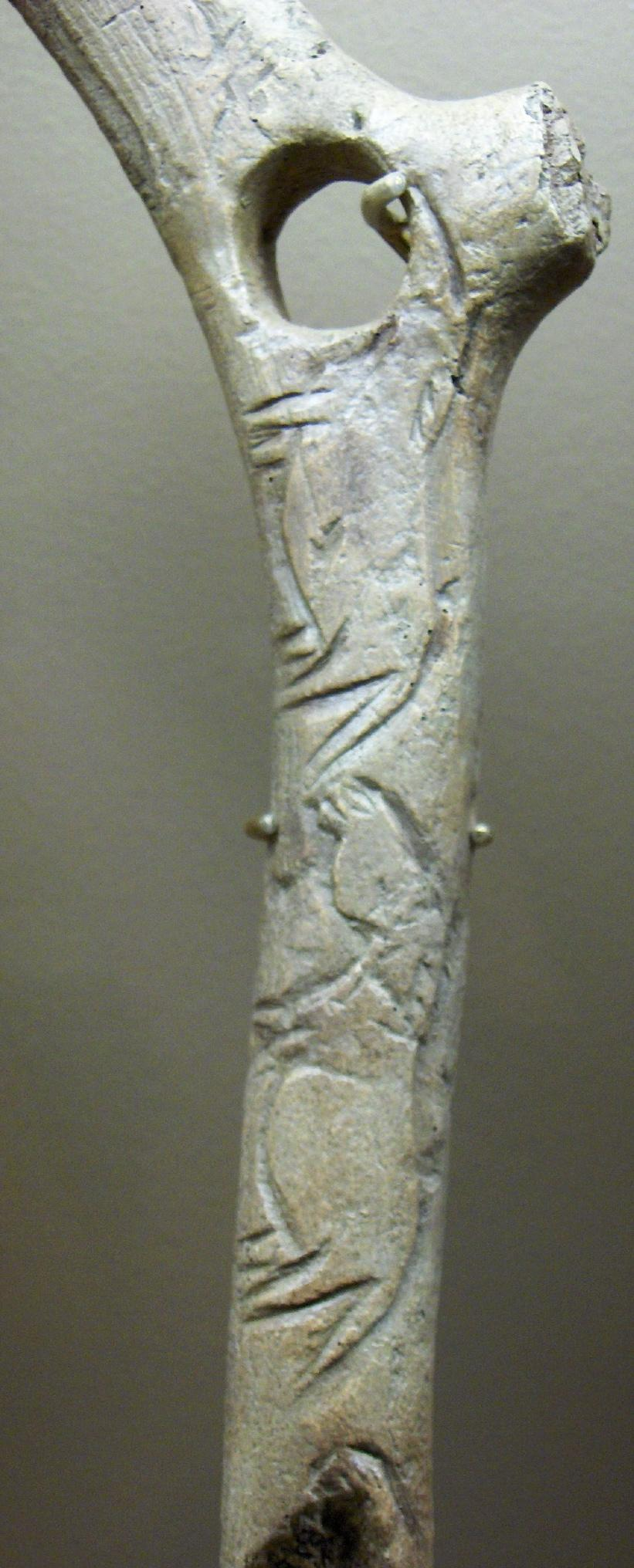
Baton with engraved wild horses from Abri de la Madeleine

In archaeology, a perforated baton, bâton de commandement or bâton percé is a type of artefact from prehistoric Europe made from antler, which probably served many functions such as being used as a spear-thrower, in rope-making, and ceremonial and other uses.

The name bâtons de commandement ("batons of command") was the name first applied to the class of artefacts, but it makes an assumption of function, as a ceremonial object or insignia held by leaders. The name bâton percé, meaning "pierced rod", or "perforated baton" (the term used by the British Museum) is a more recent term, and is descriptive of form rather than any presumed function.

Many are decorated with carved or engraved animals, and recently the most usual explanation of their use is that they were used for straightening spears and arrows, and as spear-throwers. Originally they were thought by many to be a symbolic attribute of authority.

== Description and function ==
Bâtons percés are made from a length of antler, or ivory, with at least one round hole typically made at one end. They often have abstract or animal designs etched into them (such as horses). They have been found at Aurignacian and Magdalenian sites of the Upper Paleolithic in Europe, with examples dating from 35–12,000 years ago. They have a joint at one end, often forming a T or Y shape, but always with a swelling of the antler at that end. There is a circular hole drilled through the antler just below the swelling or joint, and often a smaller second hole nearby on the shaft. Typical examples range from 6 to 8 inches (15 to 20 cm) in length. One unusual bone baton from le Souci, Lalinde has a row of eight holes of different sizes.

The purpose of the bâton percé was originally thought to be as a symbol of power or status, hence the early name bâton de commandement, or rod of command, given by Louis Laurent Gabriel de Mortillet. This interpretation is now thought unlikely; one French archaeologist wrote derisively of the name summoning up the image of "an aged general... directing... an assault on a mammoth". Other interpretations include:

- An arrow or spear-straightener, with the shaft to be straightened passing through the hole
- A spear thrower
- A symbol of fertility, with the long handle as a male phallic symbol, and the hole as representing the vagina
- A dress fastener
- A calendar used by midwives
- A tool for smoothing and shaping leather thongs.
- A dildo; few archaeologists consider these items as sex toys, but archaeologist Timothy Taylor put it, "Looking at the size, shape, and—some cases—explicit symbolism of the ice age batons, it seems disingenuous to avoid the most obvious and straightforward interpretation. But it has been avoided."
- In some instances, a rope making tool.

The British Museum "scope note" for "Perforated baton" says in 2011: "They are now understood to [be] implements used in the manufacture and throwing of spears."

Focusing only on what the objects were used for does not, however, account for why they were decorated.

== The spear thrower hypothesis ==
The use of the bâton percé as a spear-thrower has been the subject of experimental archaeology which has yielded evidence in support of the hypothesis that the bâton percé was used as a spear thrower.

The spear thrower hypothesis was first put forward in an article by artist Leon Underwood in 1965. In this, Underwood, who had previously engaged in experimental archeology working with bronze artefacts, rejected the classification of the bâton percé as a "magic wand", and drew comparisons between it and more contemporary Inuit spear throwers. Underwood's hypothesis was that the existing samples of the bâton percé were in poor shape, and may have been missing a hook, such as that found on the Inuit spear thrower and the atlatl. Underwood built two wooden models, based on different bâton percé from museum collections, but with the addition of a 'nipple' or hook to the end of the shaft opposite the hole. These reproductions were compared against Inuit designs, and were found to offer superior performance when throwing fletched spears; Underwood pointed out that the Inuit throwers, built using driftwood, were necessarily weaker and that the design reflected the available materials.

In another experiment, the bâton percé was used in the other orientation, held so that the end with the hole was outwards, and no hook was added. In this series of tests, a 5 feet (1.5 m), 1,500 grains (97 g) fletched spear was used. To use the bâton percé as a spear thrower, a length of cord is attached to the spear, near the middle of the spear. Leather would be suitable for lighter spears, while sinew would be required for heavier spears. The addition of the cord turns the spear into a large Swiss arrow. Using the spear thus equipped as a Swiss arrow resulted in a 43% increase in range, compared to a hand thrown spear.

The bâton percé is used by feeding the cord through the hole, and laying the cord along the length of the shaft. The bâton percé is held in the hand with the solid end held in the hand near the pinkie and the pierced end emerging from the other end of the fist. The loose end of the cord is grasped between thumb and forefinger, and the spear is laid along the bâton percé. The spear may be twisted up to one and a half turns, which serves to stabilize the spear during the throw. The bâton percé is held over the shoulder, and thrown overhand. The length of the bâton percé serves to increase the thrower's leverage, providing more speed, and the cord acts as it does in a Swiss arrow, extending the leverage further. Use of the bâton percé in this way results in a 127% increase in range over the same hand-thrown spear.

=== Experimental observations ===
Most bâton percé examples are curved to some degree, either from the natural curve of the antler from which they are made, or as the result of deliberate alteration. Straight or curved handles both produce similar gains in range, but the experimenters found that curved handles provided better ergonomics than a straight handle, with left-handed throwers preferring one direction of curve, and right-handed throwers preferring the other. Straight handles had the advantage of being usable by both left and right-handed throwers.

While the T or Y shape is not required for use as a spear thrower, an example with a T or Y shape is less sensitive to the direction and amount of twist in the cord, and thus easier to use. Used in the method described, even the bâton percé's hole can be dispensed with, though the resulting spear thrower would be far more difficult to load and use.

The cord used works well when it is long enough that about 8 inches (200 mm) of cord extends from the hole of the bâton percé to the knot on the spear. Longer cords up to 12 inches (300 mm) may provide higher velocities. Cord attachment points can vary from the middle of the spear to the centre of mass, depending on the length, and a significantly front-heavy spear works best.

The spear should be long enough to project about 1 foot (0.30 m) in front of the bâton percé when ready to throw. When using a long spear, a longer bâton percé can also be used, though a short version works as well. The longer bâton percé may provide additional velocity over the shorter version.

== The spear straightener hypothesis ==
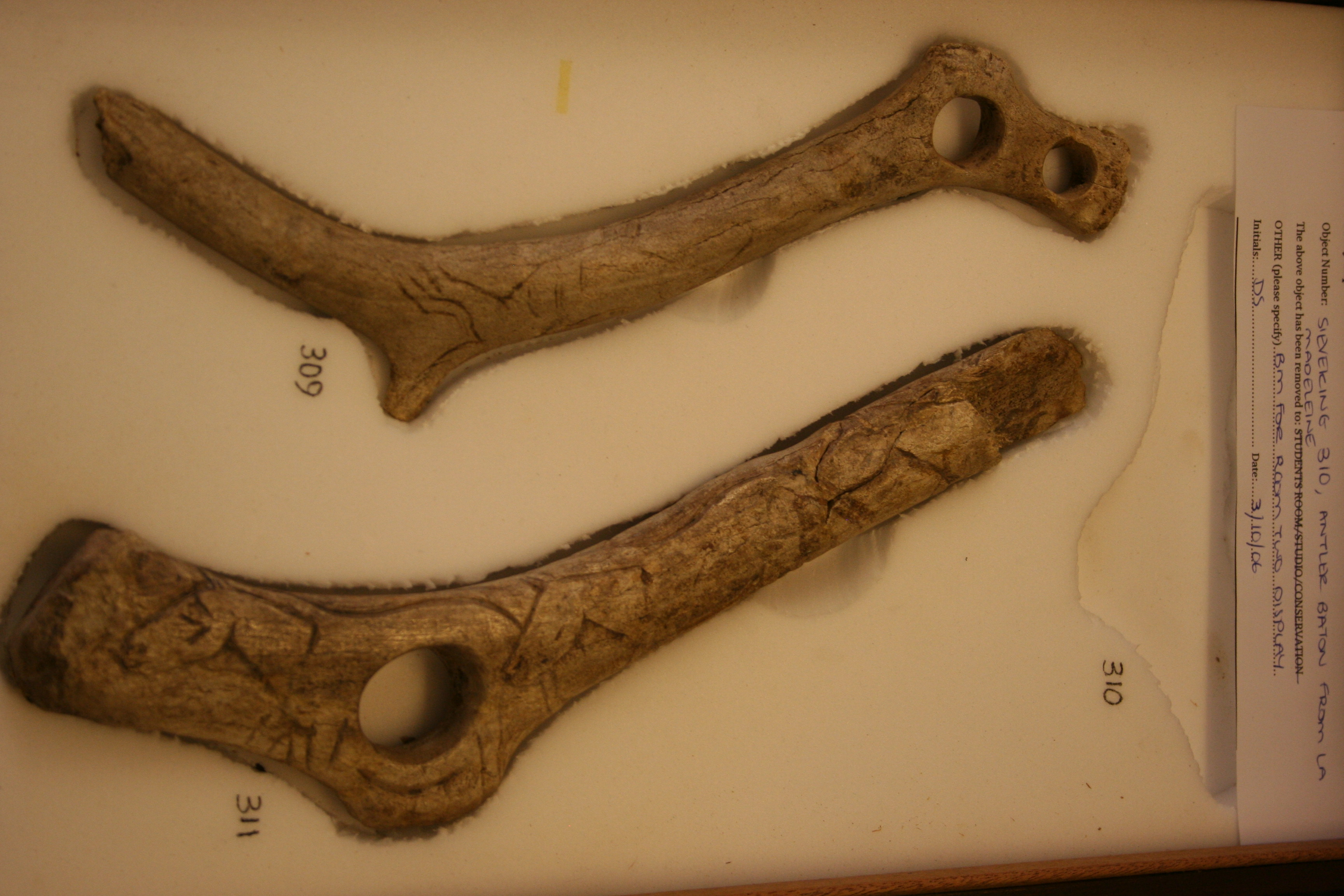
Two French batons with engraved horses, British Museum

The hypothesis that the batons were used to help fashion spears, darts, and arrows does not necessarily conflict with their use as spear-throwers.

The straighteners may have operated in two main ways. Firstly, the holes may have been used as a "shaft wrench" to lever a wooden shaft straight, perhaps after heating the shaft. The shaft would be noticeably smaller than the hole, and placed through it. By applying pressure on the baton bends in the shaft could be straightened. The second method is to put the shaft through the hole, and then spin the baton round and round, with the rough inside of the hole either wearing away the wood to achieve a tapering point, or marking areas to be whittled; it could then be fire-hardened. Smoothing leather thongs placed through the hole in a similar way is another possible use.

== Rope making ==
Some batons, especially those with multiple holes and/or spiral grooves around the holes, can function as tools for making rope, and have been found with chemical evidence suggesting this use. Also see Hohle Fels.

== Collections ==
There are examples in museums in many parts of Europe, but there are especially good holdings of decorated batons, mostly from the excavations of Magdalenian sites by Henry Christy and Édouard Lartet, in the Musée d'Archéologie Nationale, British Museum and Muséum de Toulouse. In 2013 a number of batons were displayed in an exhibition at the British Museum Ice Age Art: Arrival of the Modern Mind.

== Unique North American example ==
The "Murray Springs shaft wrench" appears to be a unique North American example of a similar tool made of bone and comes from the Clovis culture. It dates to about 9,000 years ago and was found in Arizona, where it is now in the Arizona State Museum. It is 259mm long and undecorated, with a simple shaft with a larger end, which has a single, rather oval, hole 25–30 mm across. Similar but smaller tools from much later Native American cultures are known, which are regarded as arrow-straighteners.
