= Samuel Holt =

Samuel or Sam Holt may refer to:

- Samuel Holt (politician) (1880–1929), Irish politician
- Samuel Holt (weaver) (1811–1887), British weaver, inventor and industrialist
- Sam B. Holt (1902–1986), American football, basketball, and baseball coach and athletics administrator
- Samuel C. O. Holt (born 1936), public television and radio executive
- Lynching of Sam Hose (aka Sam Holt, c. 1875 – 1899), African American lynched in Coweta County, Georgia
