= Bison Licking Insect Bite =

Prehistoric carving found in France

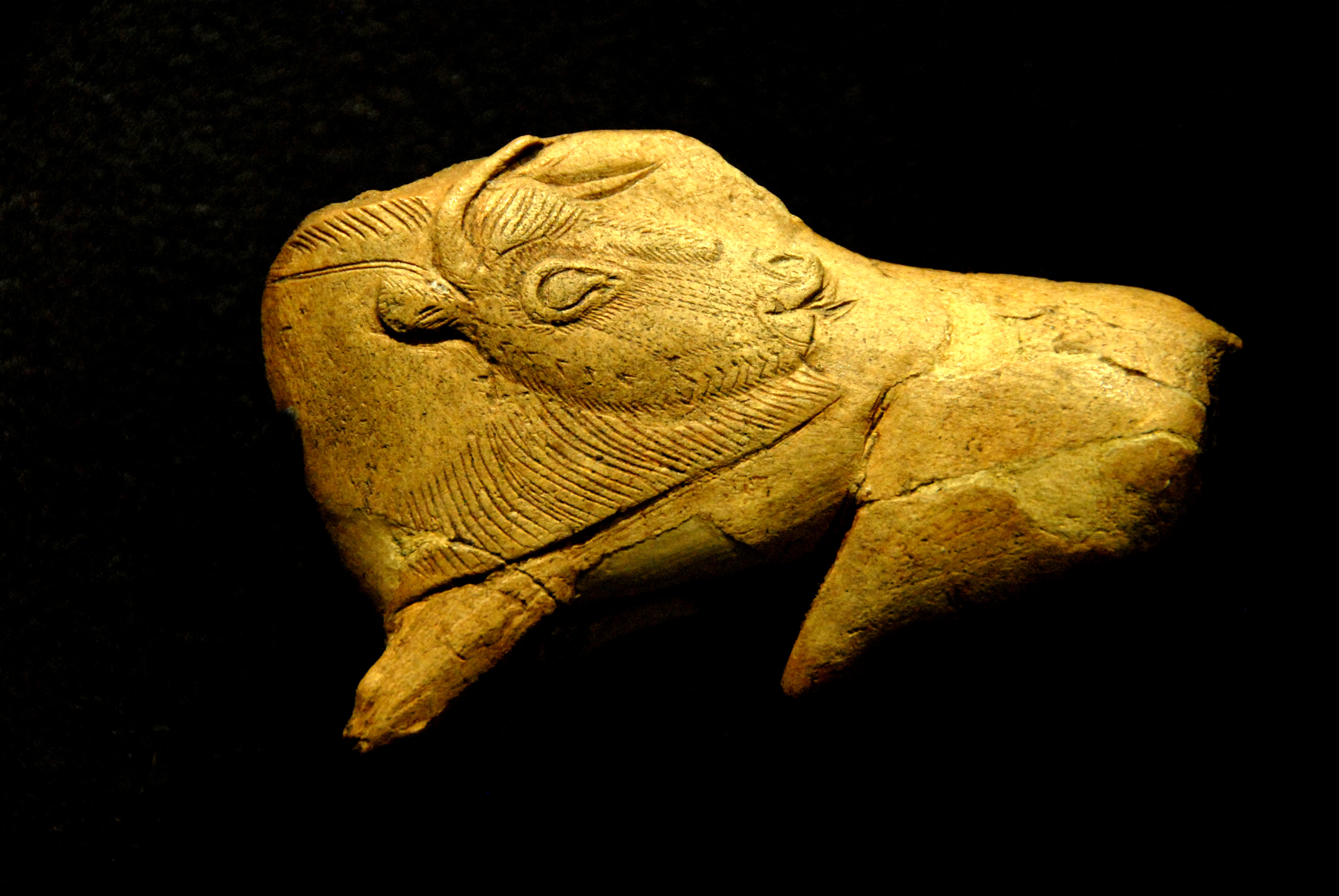
- Bison carved on reindeer antler fragment, National Museum of Prehistory in Les Eyzies
- Material: Reindeer antler
- Width: 10.5 cm
- Created: c.15,000 years before present
- Discovered: Tursac, Dordogne, France
- Present location: Les Eyzies, Dordogne, France

Bison Licking Insect Bite is a prehistoric carving from the Upper Paleolithic, found at Abri de la Madeleine near Tursac in Dordogne, France, the type-site of the Magdalenian culture, which produced many fine small carvings in antler or bone.

Created sometime between 20,000 and 12,000 BP (15,000 BP according to the museum), it was formerly in the Musee des Antiquites Nationales, St. Germain-en-Laye, but has been transferred to the expanded National Museum of Prehistory in Les Eyzies-de-Tayac-Sireuil that opened in 2004, not far from its findspot. It is a carved and engraved fragment of a spear-thrower made of reindeer antler. It depicts the 10.5 cm figure of a bison, of the now extinct species steppe wisent (Bison priscus) with its head turned around and showing its tongue extended. It is thought the spear-thrower was broken into roughly its present shape before the carving was made from the fragment, hence the need to show the turned-back head of the animal in order to fit the existing structure.

== See also ==
- List of Stone Age art
