= Alfred Christy =

English cricketer

Alfred Christy (17 January 1818 – 23 March 1876) was an English cricketer who played for Surrey. The son of John Christy of Aperfield and Sarah De Horne, he was born in Southwark and died at Aperfield, the family estate near Cudham, Kent. He belonged to an influential Quaker family with business in the textile industry, and was a first cousin of Henry Christy and Samuel Christy-Miller.

Christy made a single first-class appearance, in 1857, against Cambridgeshire. Batting as a tailender, he scored a duck in each innings in which he batted.

Christy's younger brother Frederick had played three first-class matches in the 1840s.
