= Waffle fabric =

Type of woven or knit fabric

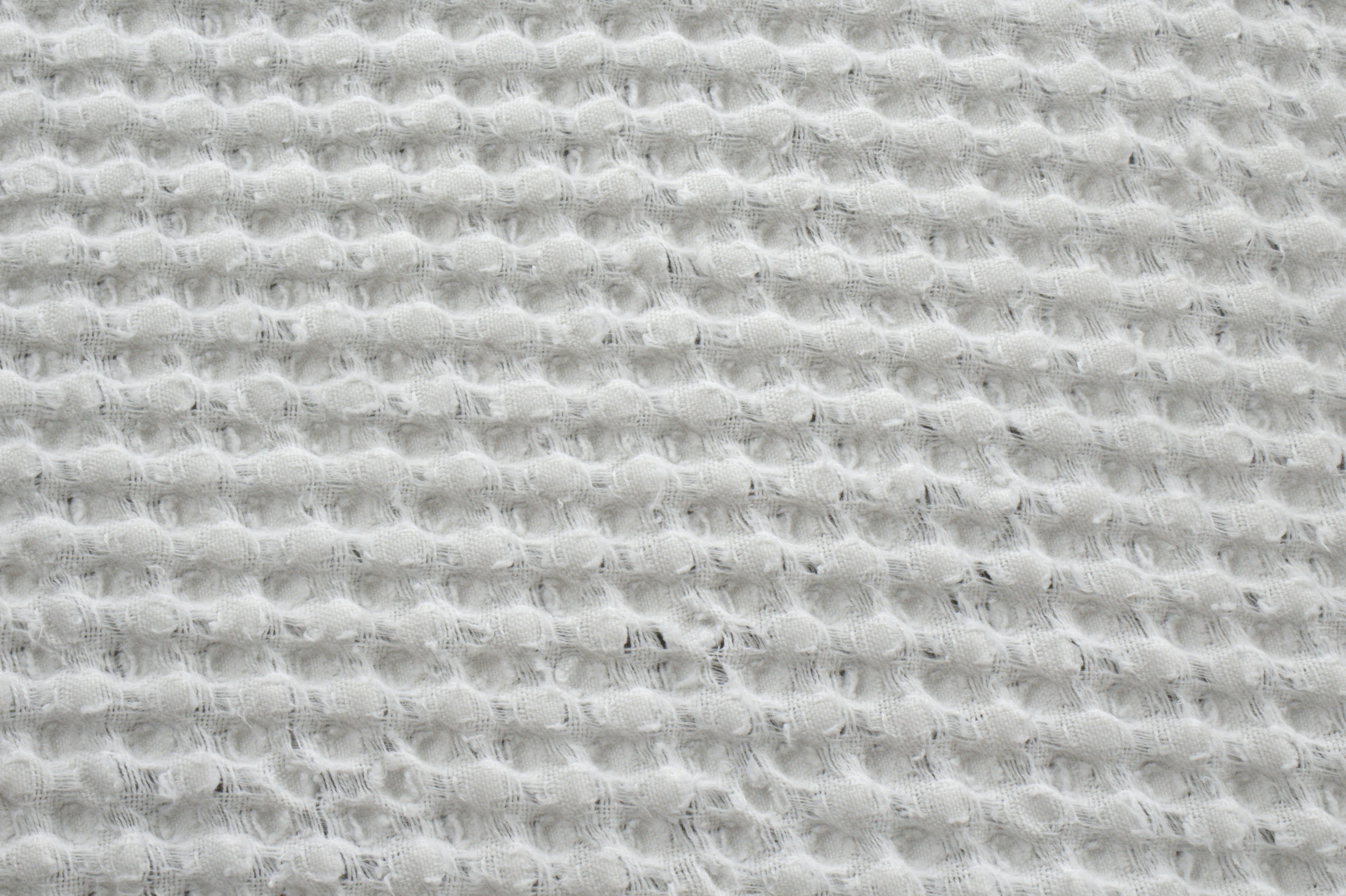
An example of waffle fabric

Waffle fabric, also known as honeycomb fabric, has a surface texture that looks like a waffle with raised threads that form small rectangles, hence the name. Waffle weave is a further exploitation of plain weave and twill weave which produces a three-dimensional effect. The combination of warp and weft floats creates the structure. It is woven partly on tabby (plain) areas surrounded by ridges of long floats. The weave consists of warp and weft floats arranged around a plain weave center. The warp and weft threads are interlaced and floating in a way that creates small square ridges and hollows in the fabric in a regular pattern.

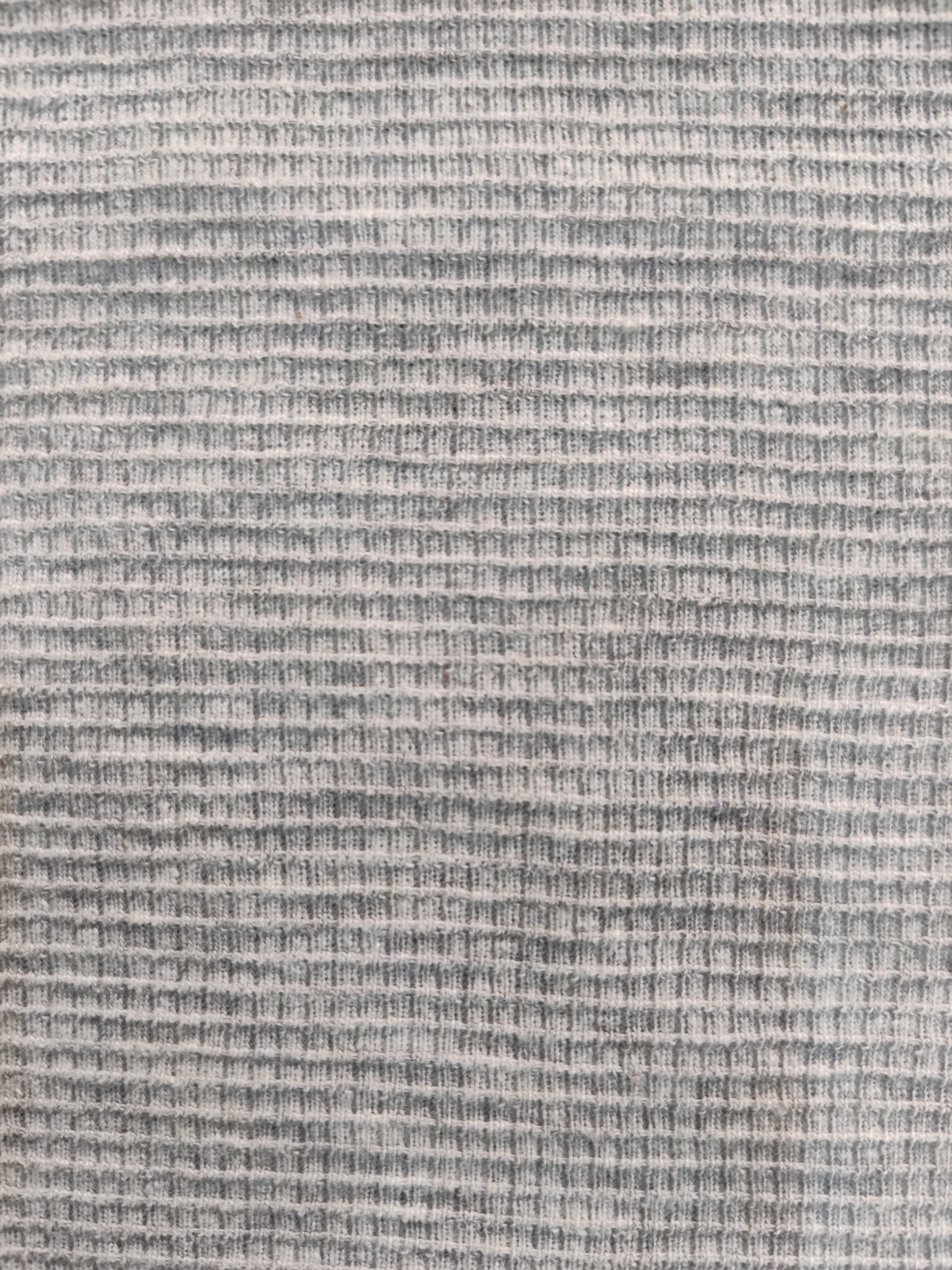
An example of waffle fabric

Waffle fabric can be woven. It can also be knitted on a double jersey knitting machine by selecting the needle position for knitting and tucking the loops for the formation of the structure similar to floating warps and weft in weaving. The knitted waffle, also known as thermal fabric, can be produced in big waffle and mini waffle variants.

== Characteristics ==
The "face" is a weaver's term that refers to whether the warp or weft dominates the fabric. The three-dimensional face/texture of waffle make it more absorbent, useful for absorbing liquids, typically as a towel. Waffle fabric is usually made of cotton or microfibre, sometimes of linen, and is woven in a way that makes it very absorbent. The waffle weave allows air to flow through the fabric so that it dries quickly. Waffle fabrics are made in a range of weights.

Some towels are made in light weights with waffle weave on one side, terry on the other, sometimes described as terry waffle or hybrid waffle. They are claimed to combine the comfort of terry with the quick drying of waffle.

== Uses ==
The texture of waffle fabric makes it more absorbent than other weaves, making it suitable as an alternative to terry towelling for bathrobes, towels, and wipes for cleaning surfaces. It is also used for apparel.
