= Christy (towel manufacturer) =

British manufacturer

Christy UK
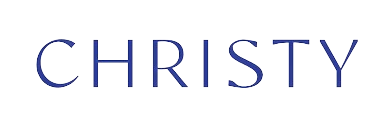
- Industry: Home Textiles
- Founded: 1850
- Founders: William Miller Christy; Henry Christy
- Headquarters: United Kingdom
- Products: Towels; Bedlinen
- Parent: Welspun India
- Website: http://www.christy.co.uk

Christy (also known as Christy UK and Christy Towels) is a manufacturer of household linens and is known as the inventor of the first industrially produced looped cotton (terrycloth) towel. It was founded in 1850 in the English mill town of Droylsden, Lancashire (now part of Greater Manchester).

== History ==
John Rylands Library archives show that the roots of the Christy company date from at least 1833, when the Stockport firm of W. M. Christy & Sons Ltd – established by banker and hatter William Miller Christy – was manufacturing cotton goods. Christy's son, the noted collector and ethnologist Henry Christy, discovered the product that would make the company famous. While travelling in Istanbul, he saw an example of the looped pile fabric that is known today as terry towelling, but which was initially known as the 'Turkish towel'. The company found a method of weaving the looped pile fabric on an industrial scale using a machine designed by one of their employees Samuel Holt, who patented the design. The first Christy towels factory opened in Droylsden in 1850. A year later, Christy towels were displayed at The Great Exhibition at Crystal Palace, Queen Victoria became an early client. By 1891, the company's Fairfields Mill in Droylsden had 310 looms and 30,000 spindles, according to Worrall's Cotton Spinners Directory.

Christy was purchased by Fine Spinners and Doublers in 1955, and became part of the Courtaulds group eight years later. The company relocated from its Droylsden base to Hyde, Greater Manchester in the late 1980s. When Courtaulds spun off its textile businesses in 2000, Christy was sold to a management buyout team.

== The company today ==
Christy became a subsidiary of Welspun India Ltd in 2006, shifting towel manufacturing from its base in Hyde, Greater Manchester to Gujarat in 2010. The company's UK headquarters was relocated to Cheadle in 2012. In addition to retailing towels, bathrobes and bedlinen in stores throughout the UK, the company sells online and in Europe, the U.S. and Australia. Notably, it supplies towels to Bloomingdale's.

Christy also produces for other brands, including Harlequin and Agent Provocateur. The company has a long-term relationship with tennis, producing the towels used by players at Wimbledon since 1987. In 2012, the company produced over 99,000 Wimbledon towels, which are also sold to tournament attendees.

The Times reported in 2013 that only a third of the towels Christy supplies to the Championship are returned, due to the players keeping them or throwing them into the crowd as mementos.

== External sources ==
- Christy website detailing company history
- W.M. Christy & Sons Ltd archive at the University of Manchester Library
