= Terrycloth =

Absorbent textile with a looped pile

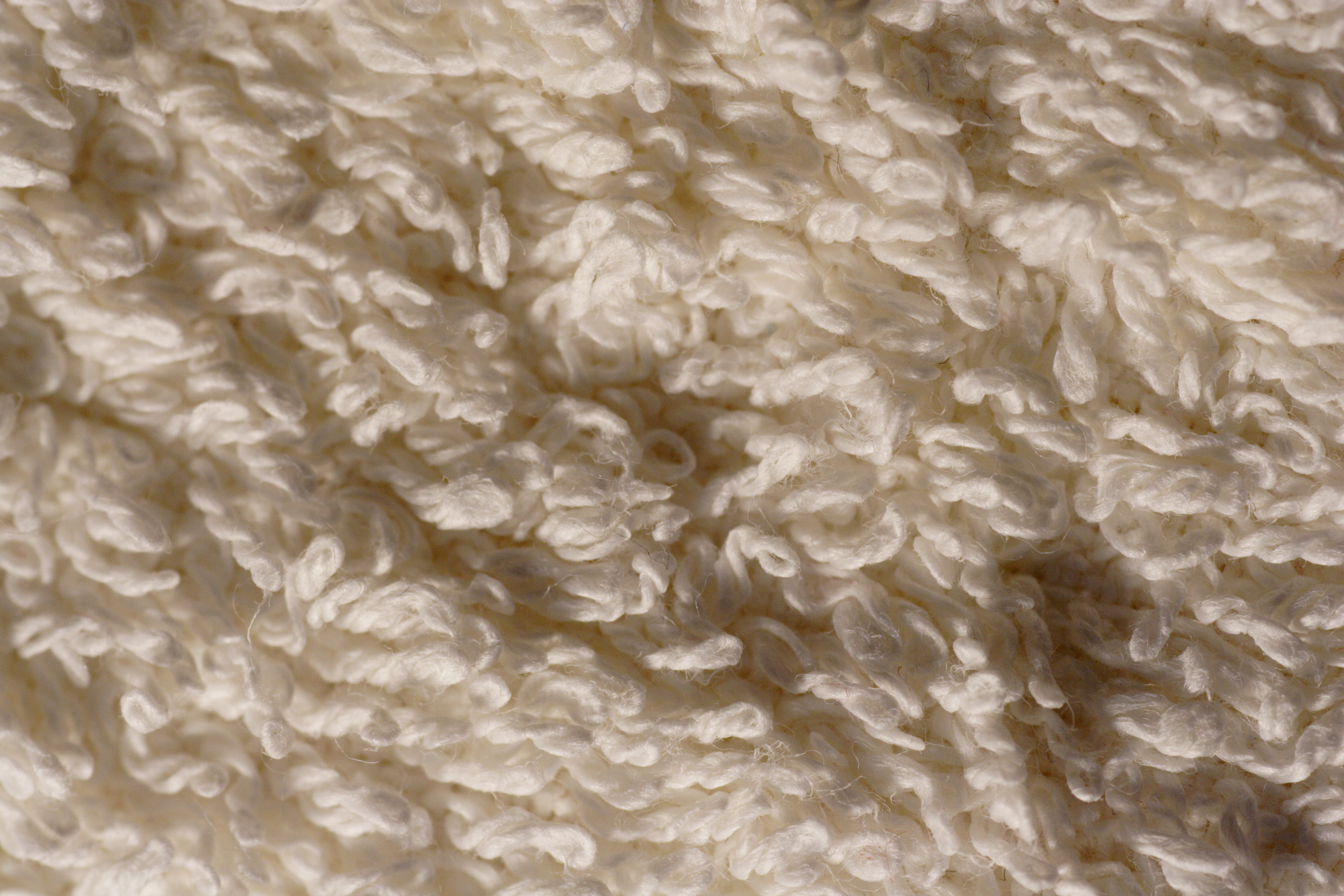
Terrycloth (close-up)

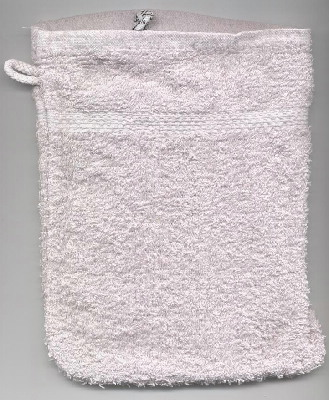
Terrycloth wash mitt

Terrycloth, terry cloth, terry cotton, terry towelling, towelling, terry towel, or simply terry is a fabric woven with many protruding loops of thread which can absorb large amounts of water. It can be manufactured by weaving or knitting. Terrycloth is woven on special looms that have two beams of longitudinal warp through which the filler or weft is fired laterally.

== History ==
Fabrics with a pile formed from loops of loosened, uncut warp threads were woven in ancient Egypt and pre-Columbian Peru; there is linen terrycloth from 4000 BCE.

The modern form, however, was introduced to the West in the mid-19th century. The English towel manufacturer Christy started industrial production in 1850, based on observations of handwoven terrycloth in Turkey, and produced using a machine designed by one of their staff, Samuel Holt. Queen Victoria approved the name "Royal Turkish Towels".

In the United States, they became popular after World War I.

The origin of the word is unclear; it may derive from French tiré 'drawn', and was originally used for uncut velvet, called terry pile or terry velvet.

== About ==
There are two types of terry fabrics:

Towel terry
This is a woven fabric with long loops that can absorb large amounts of water. Its content is usually 100% cotton, but may sometimes contain polyester.
French terry
This is a type of fabric used in clothing. Ranging from items such as hoodies, pants and even shirts. The inside of the fabric is crossed with loops, while the outer part is smooth and flat. It can be 100% cotton or be made from a variety of fibers, sometimes with spandex (also known as elastane or lycra). It is often warp-knitted, and the term French terry is colloquially used for all warp-knitted terry.

It is the length of loops that determines how much fluid is absorbed by the cloth as longer loops provide more surface area to come in contact with and absorb the fluid.

Items that may be made from terrycloth include babies' reusable diapers (or "nappies" in British English), towels, bathrobes, and sweatbands for the wrist or head. Terrycloth is also sometimes used to make sweat-jackets. Terry-toweling hats with a shallow brim were once popular with cricketers (like English wicketkeeper Jack Russell), but are no longer in fashion.

A slow method of machine-making French terry results in a soft, sturdy variety called loopwheel. Loopwheel machines can only produce one yard an hour. It was invented in the 1920s and was at the height of its popularity in the forties and fifties, at which point it was overtaken by side-seam manufacturing. Only two factories remain.

Another fabric used for towels is waffle fabric. A modern cheaper alternative is a short-loop tight-woven nonabsorptive (but somewhat wicking) fabric made of synthetic microfiber.

== General and cited sources ==
- Yilmaz, Nasire Deniz; Powell, Nancy B.; Durur, Güngör (Summer 2005). "The Technology of Terry Towel Production" (PDF). Journal of Textile and Apparel, Technology and Management. 4 (4). University of North Carolina State: 115–160. ISSN 1533-0915. Archived from the original on 9 September 2006.
