= Abri de la Madeleine =

Cave and archaeological site in France

- Magdalene rock shelter
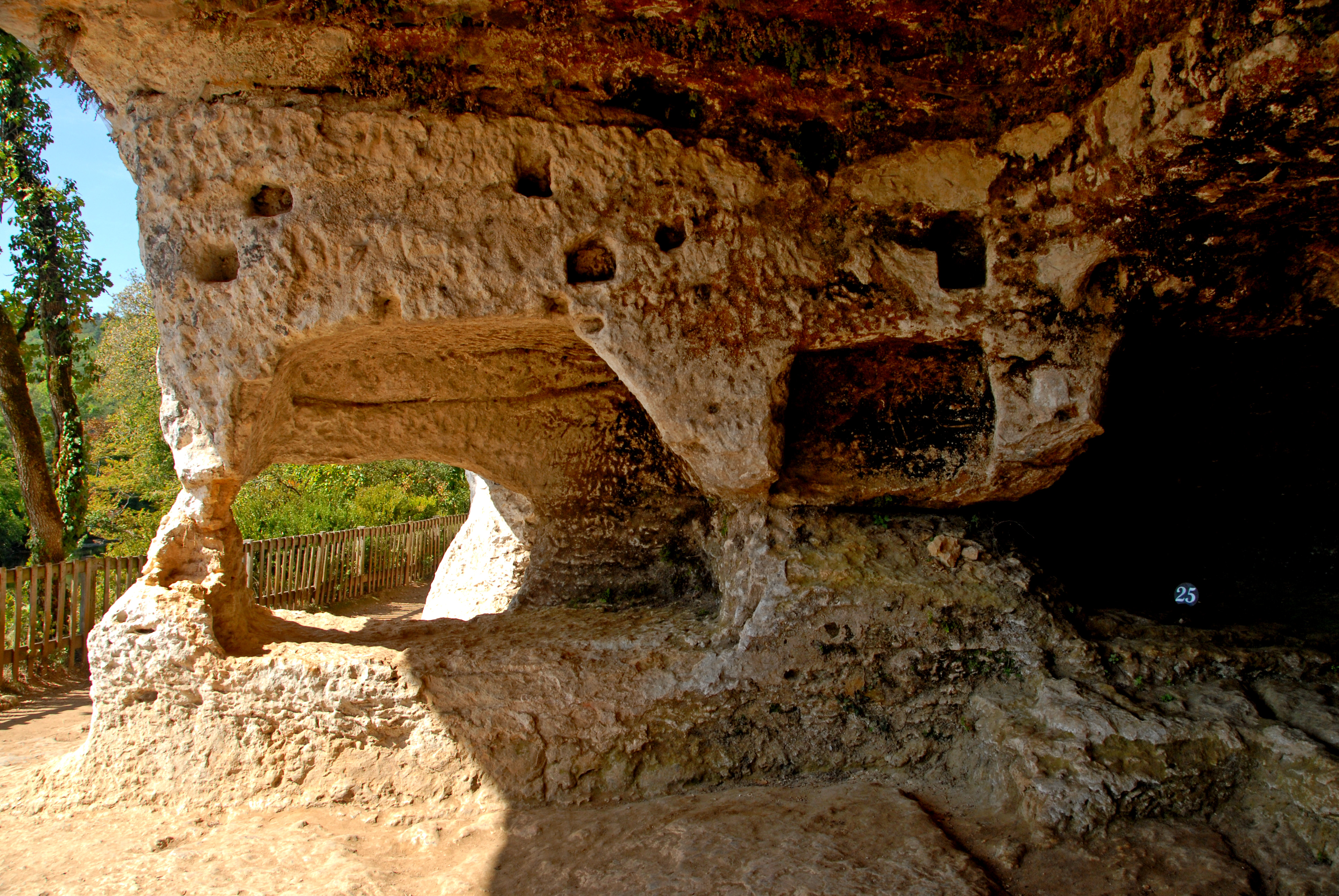
- La Madeleine rock shelter

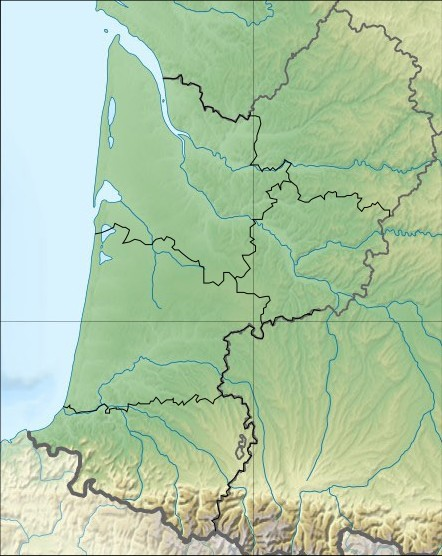
- La Madeleine rock shelter location in France Abri de la Madeleine (France)
- 44°58′05″N 1°01′44″E
- Periods: Upper Palaeolithic,
- Cultures: Magdalenian
- Associated with: European early modern humans
- Location: Near Tursac, Dordogne département
- Region: Aquitaine région, southwestern France

Site notes
- Excavation dates: 1875
- Archaeologists: Édouard Lartet, Henry Christy

UNESCO World Heritage Site
- Criteria: Cultural: (i)(iii)
- Designated: 1979 (3rd session)
- Part of: Prehistoric Sites and Decorated Caves of the Vézère Valley
- Reference no.: 85bis-015

The archaeological site Abri de la Madeleine (Magdalene Shelter) is a rock shelter under an overhanging cliff situated near Tursac, in the Dordogne département of the Aquitaine région of southwestern France. It represents the type site of the Magdalenian culture of the Upper Paleolithic. The shelter was also occupied during the Middle Ages. The medieval castle of Petit Marsac stands on the top of the cliff just above the shelter.

== Excavations ==
Édouard Lartet, financed and helped by the Englishman Henry Christy, were the first systematic excavators of the site, starting in 1863, and published their findings in 1875 under the name of the Age of the Reindeer ("L'âge du renne"). Objects that were found at the la Madeleine site are distributed among a number of museums, including the Muséum de Toulouse, the Musee des Antiquites Nationales, St. Germain-en-Laye and the British Museum.

Artifacts excavated from the site include:

- The Bison Licking Insect Bite, a 20,000 year old carving (15,000 BP according to the National Museum of Prehistory) of exceptional artistic quality.
- A perforated baton with low relief horse aka. Baton fragment (Palart 310).
- An engraved bone rod that depicts, according to Timothy Taylor (1996), a lioness licking the opening of either a gigantic human penis or a vulva.

== Conservation ==
The Abri de la Madeleine is classified as a Monument historique since 1956.

In 1979, the Abri de la Madeleine was inscribed on the UNESCO World Heritage List as part of the Prehistoric Sites and Decorated Caves of the Vézère Valley because of its unique paleolithic artwork and archeological importance.

== Gallery ==
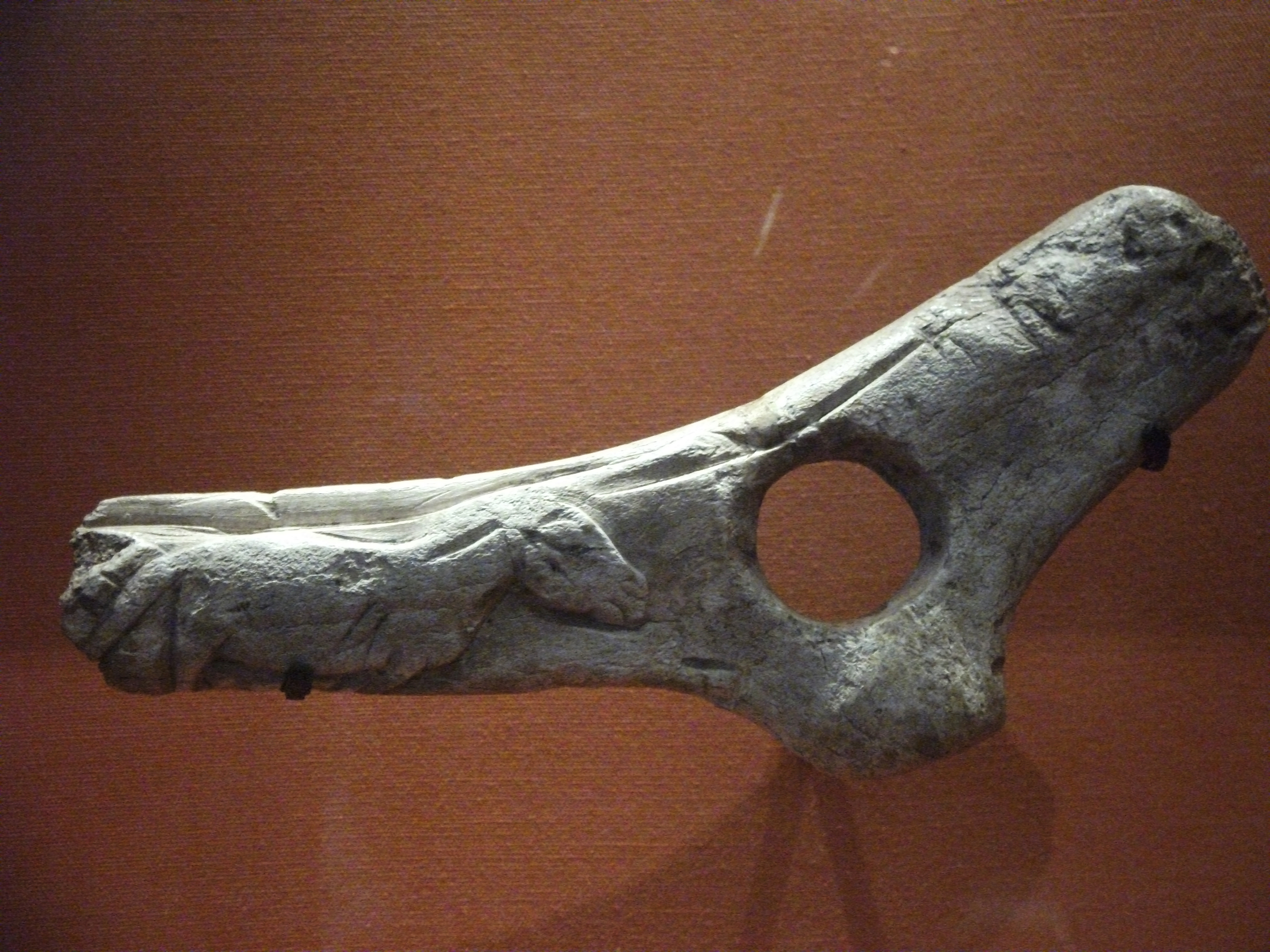
Perforated baton with low relief horse, from the Abri de la Madeleine, British Museum

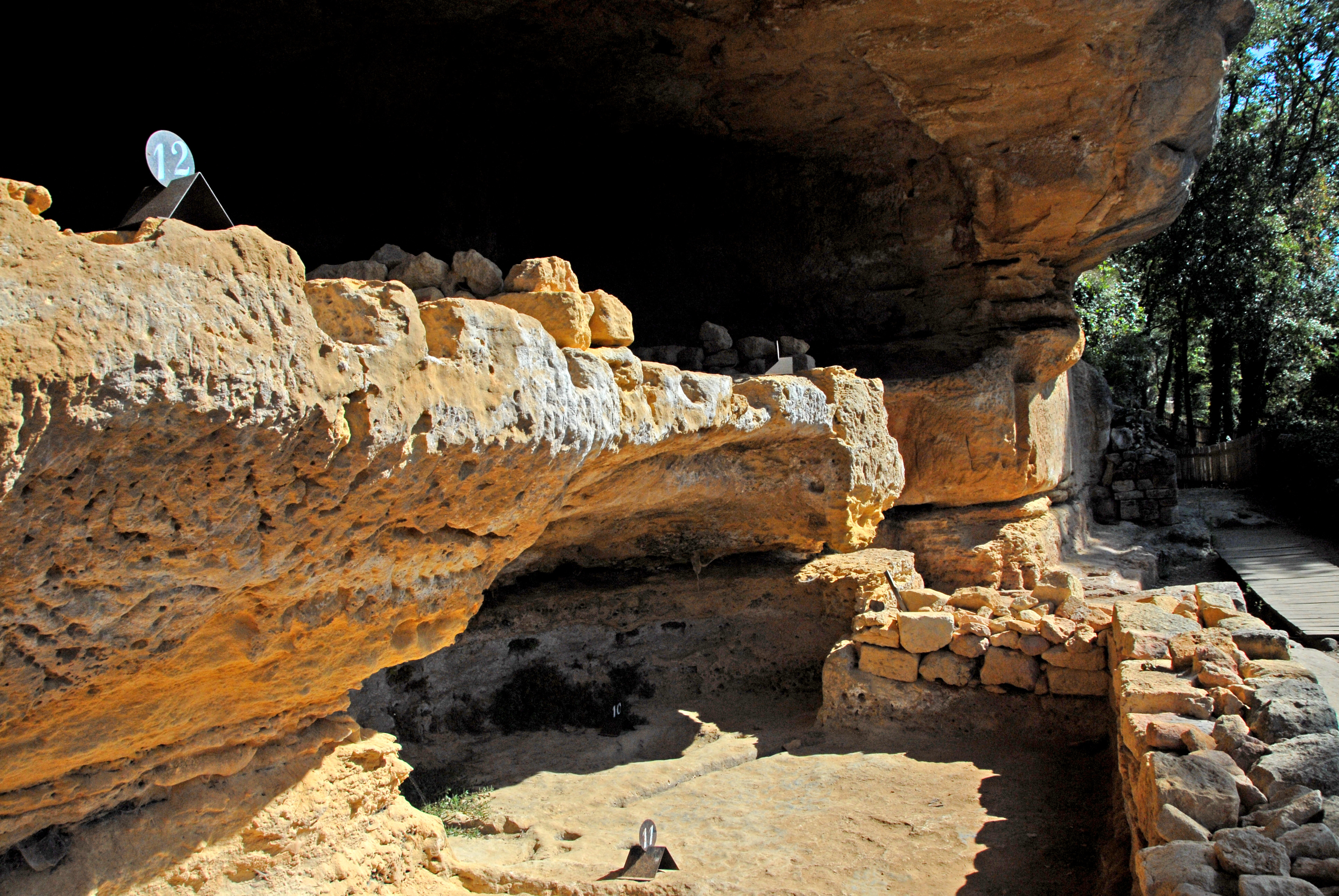

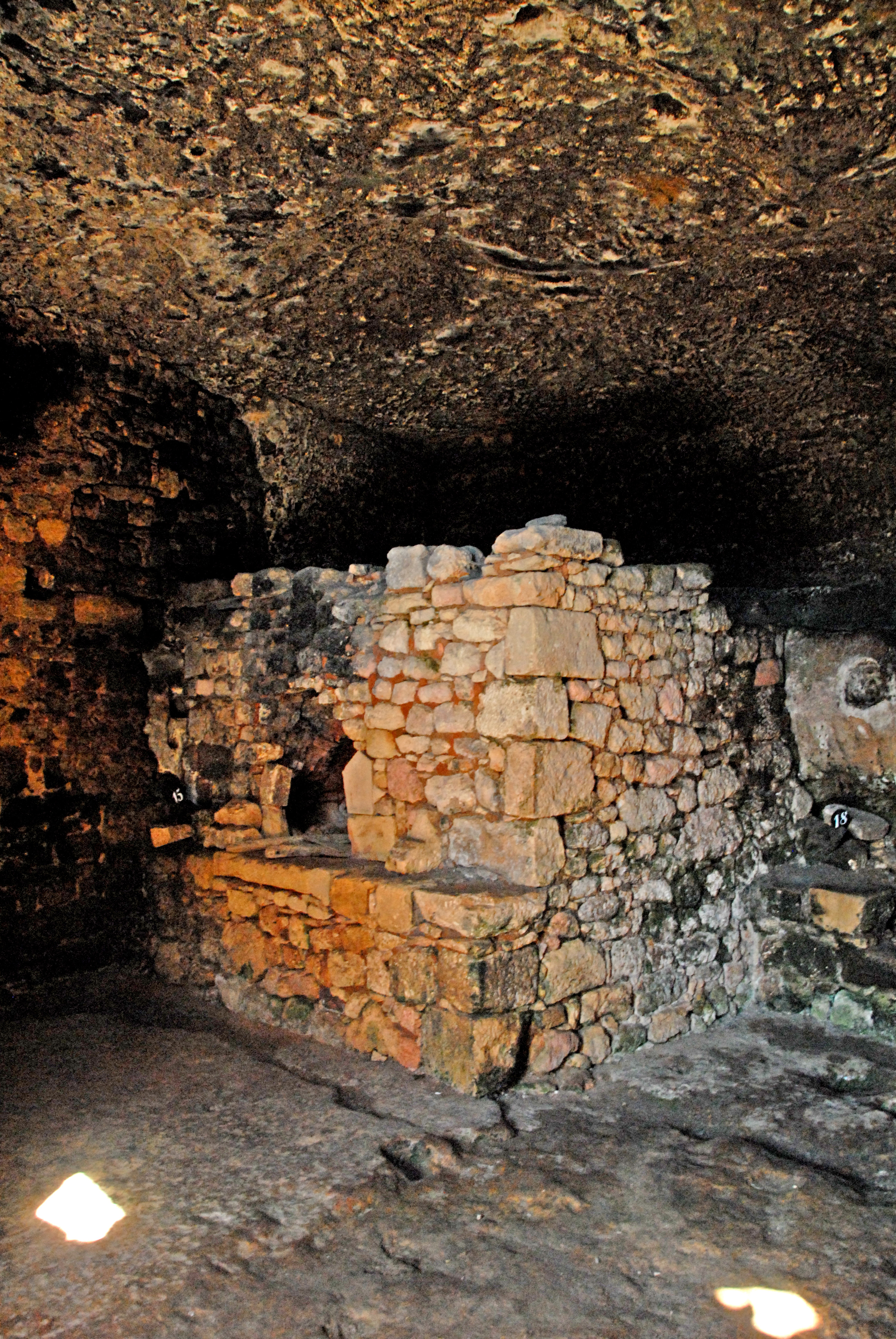

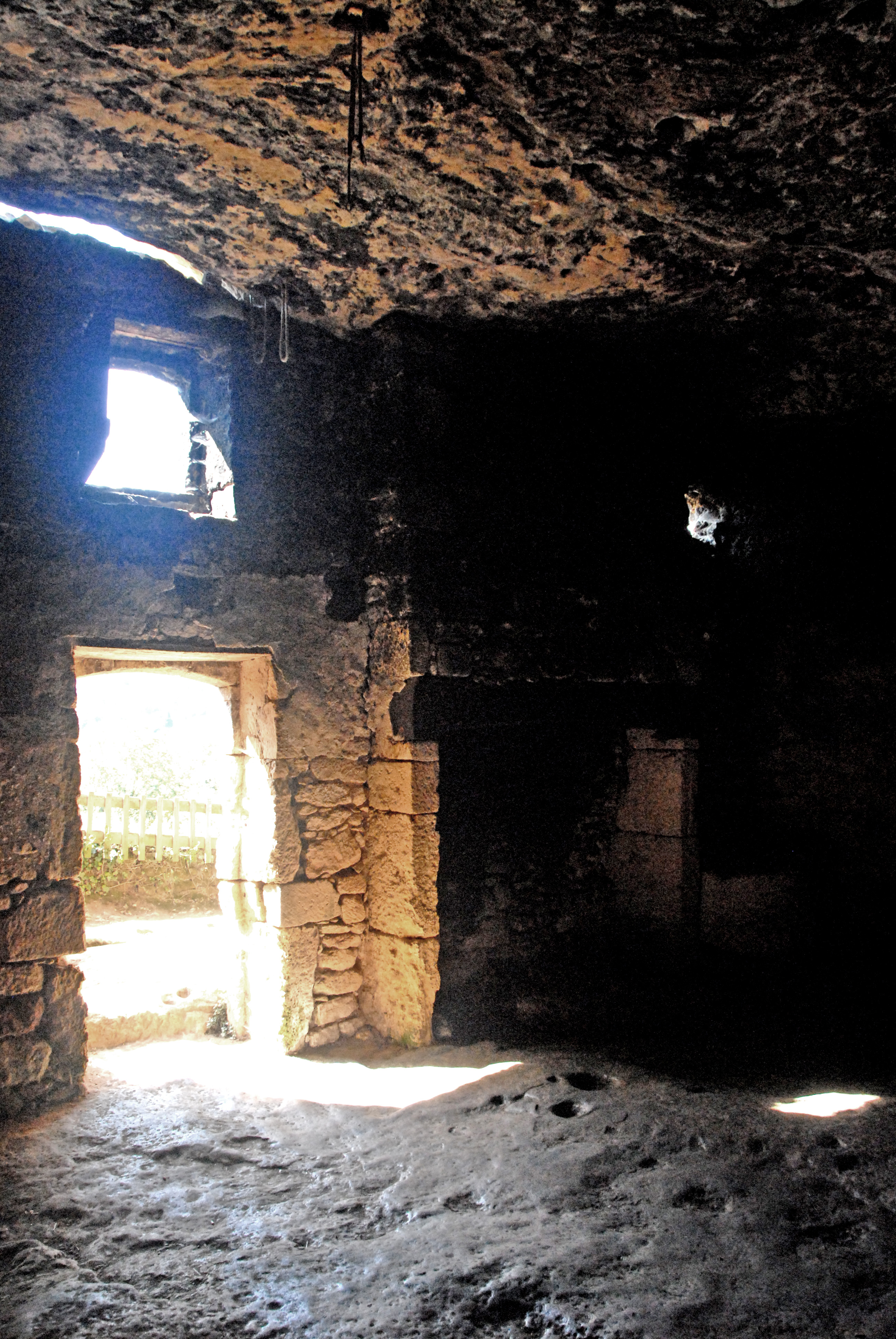

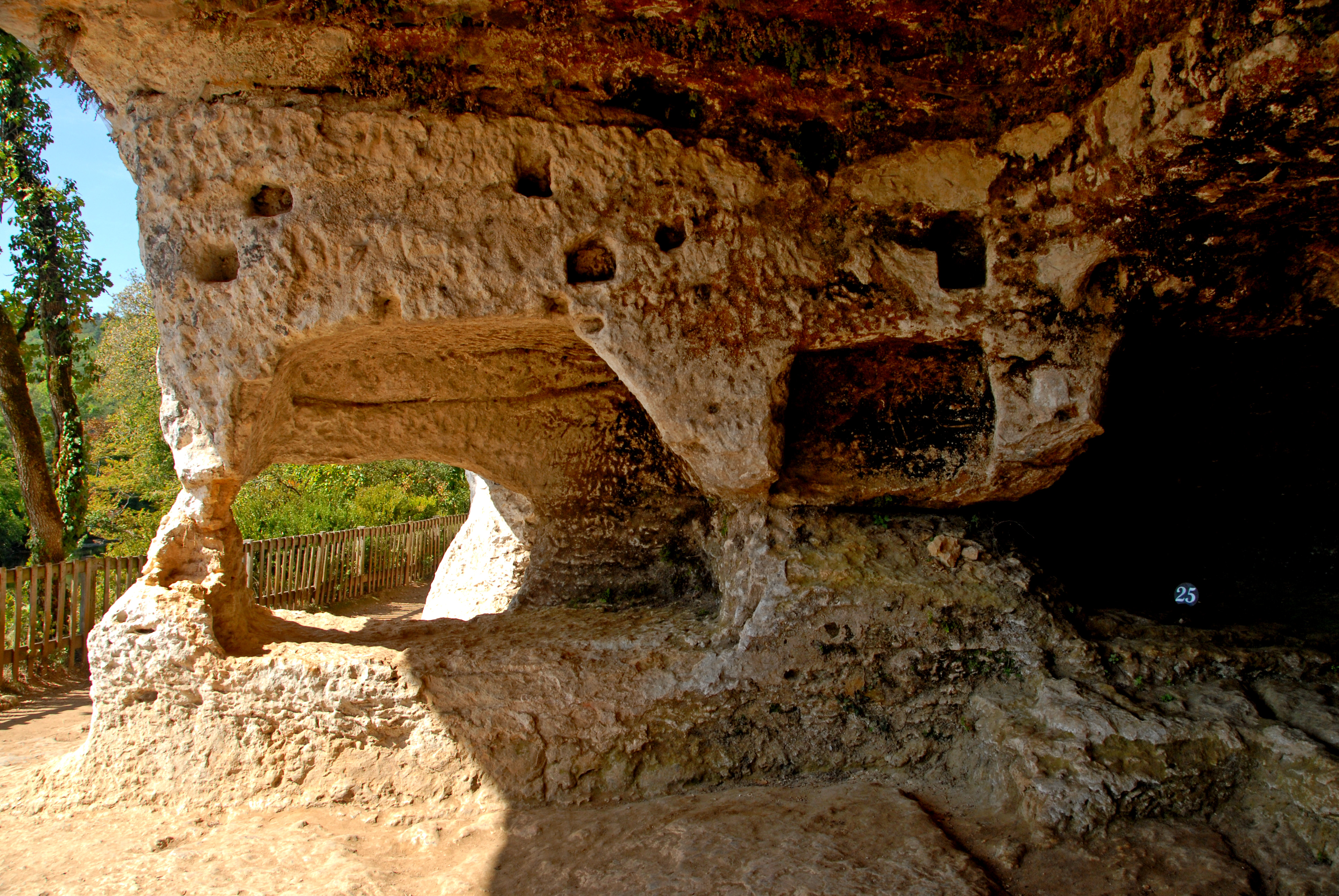

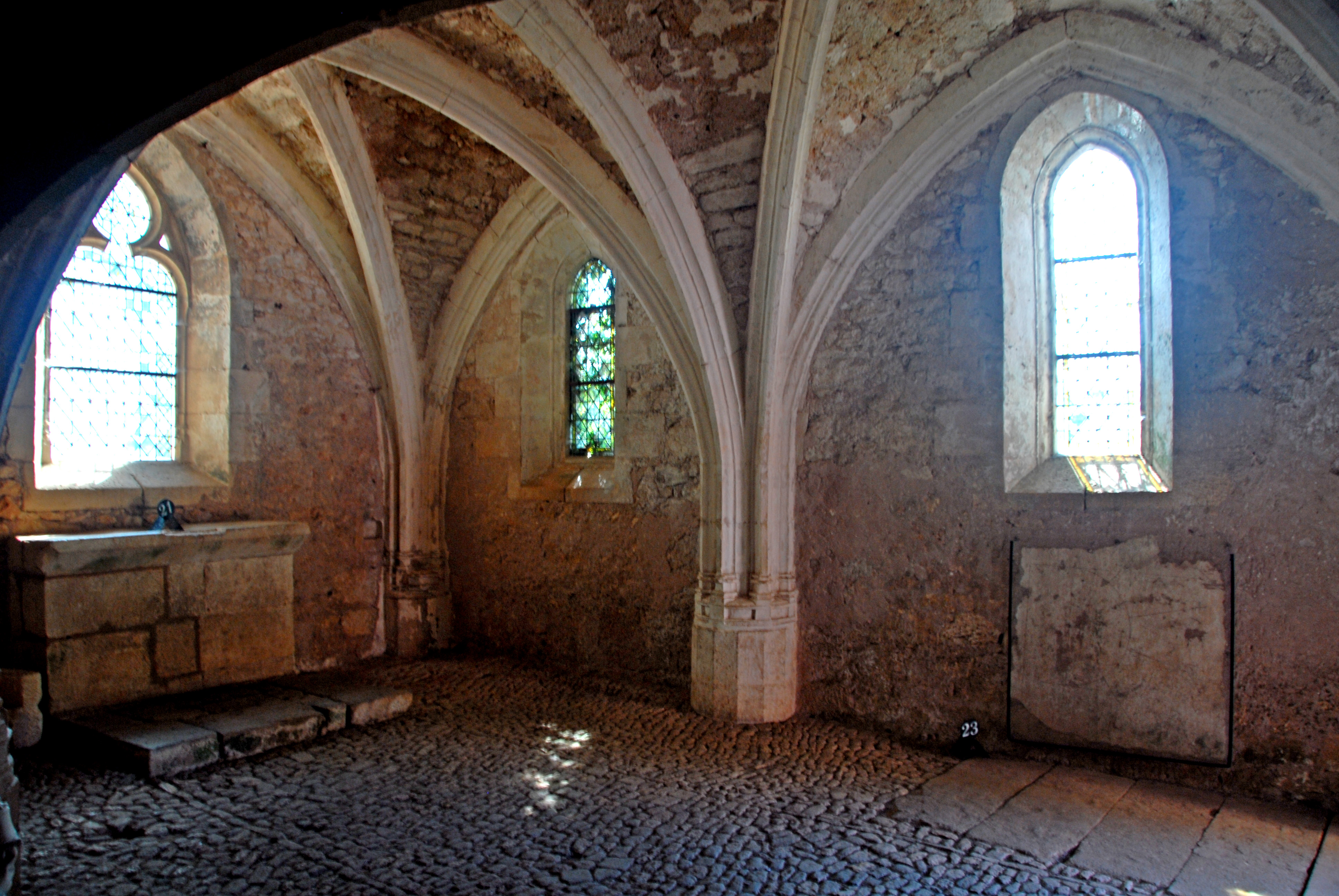

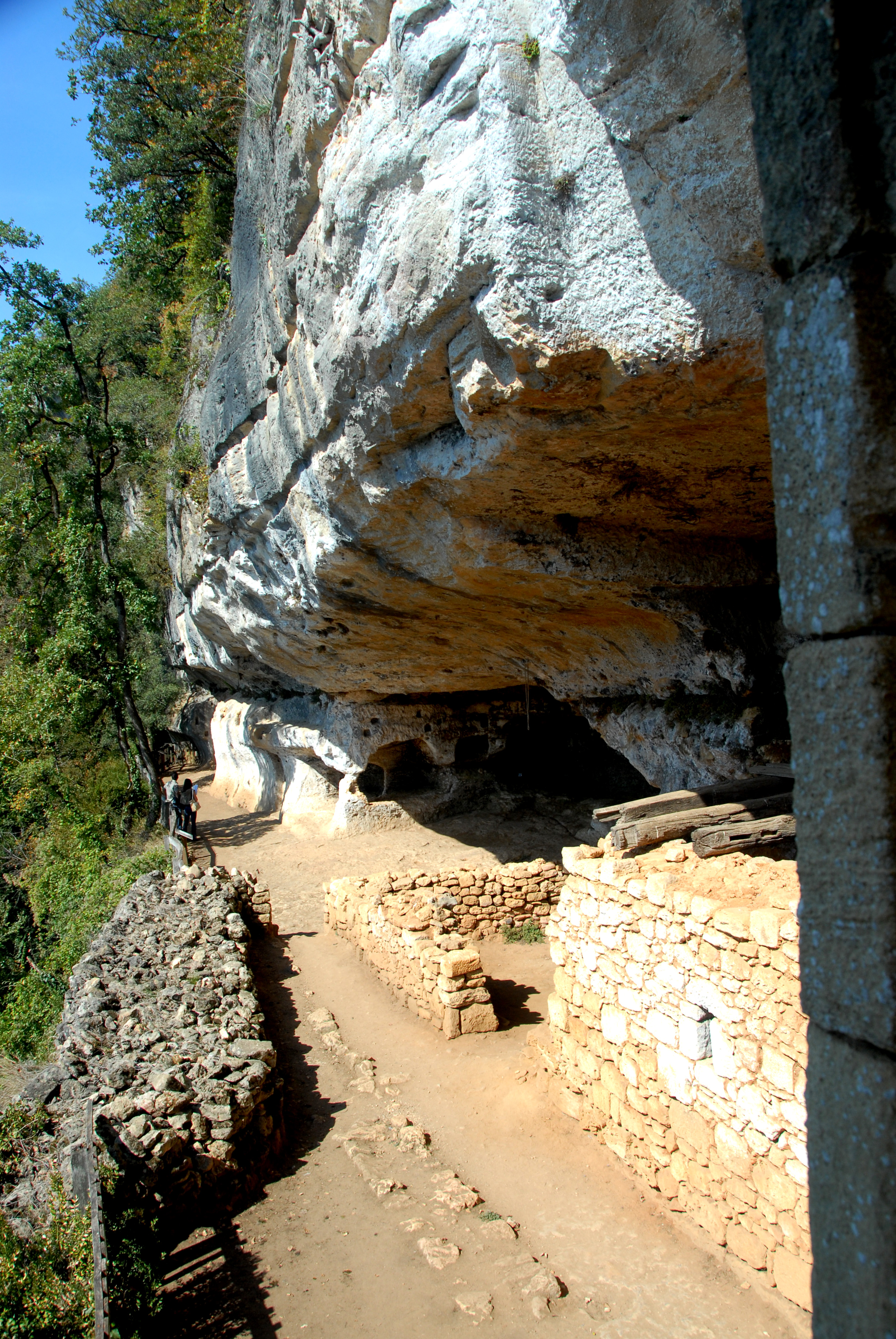

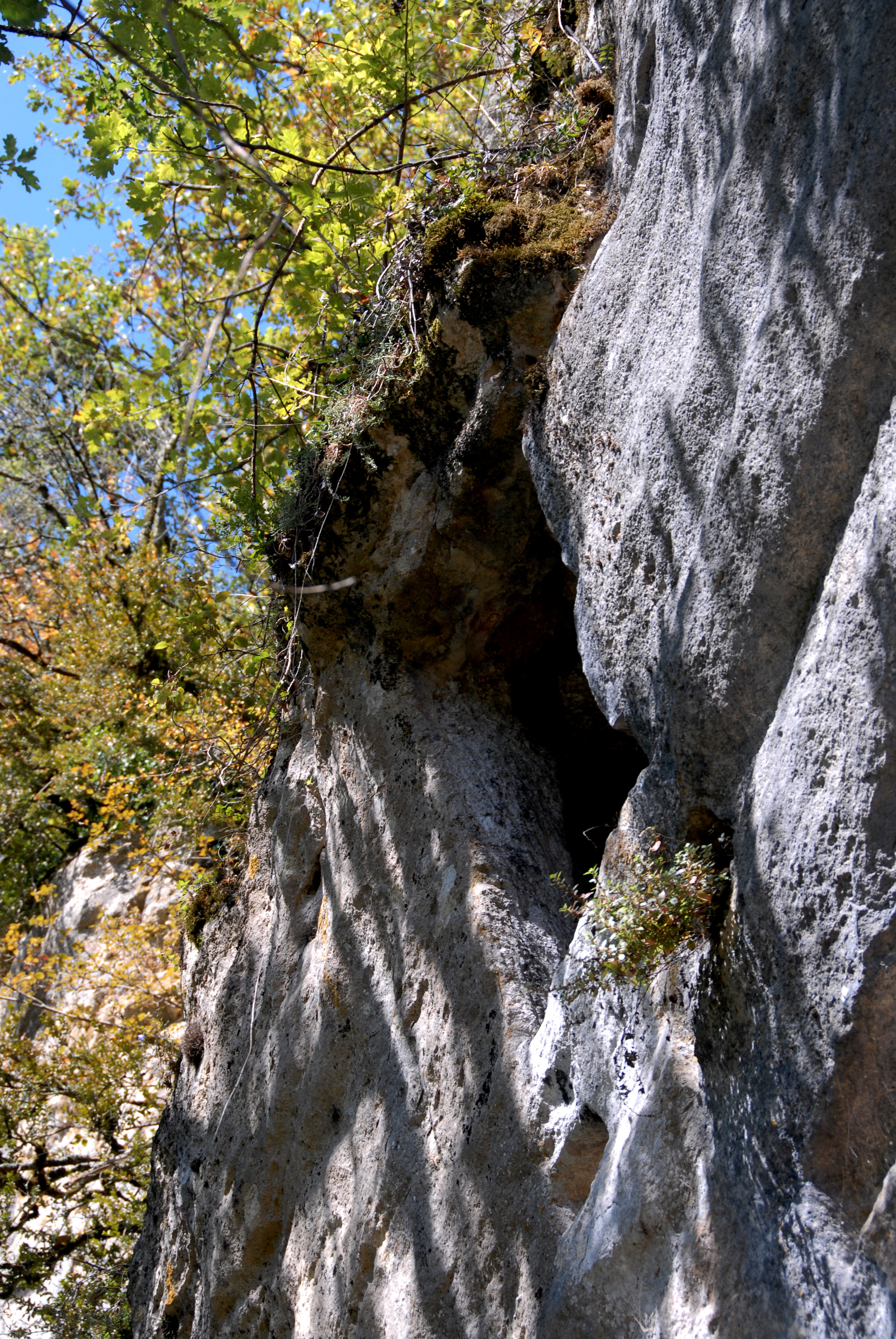

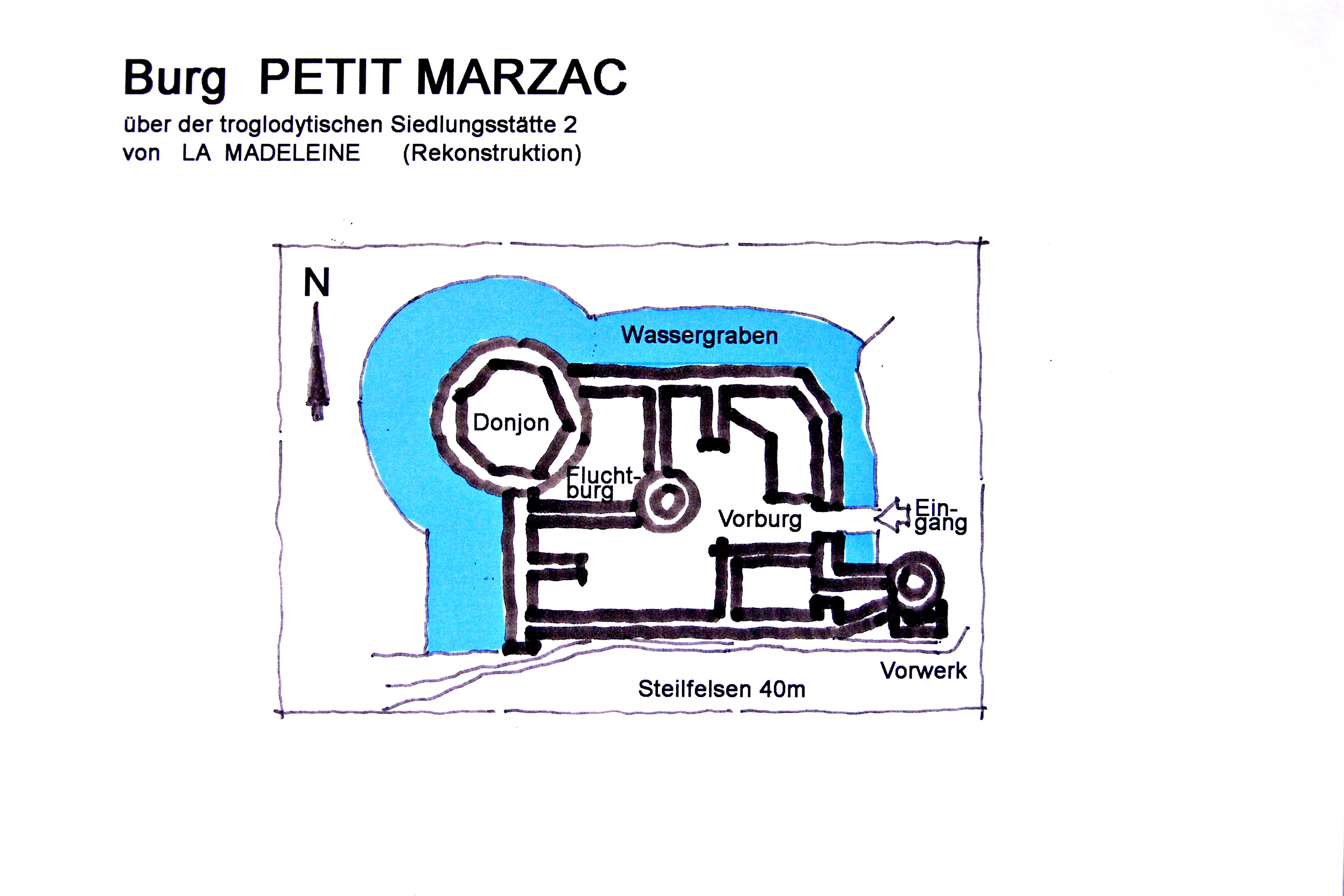

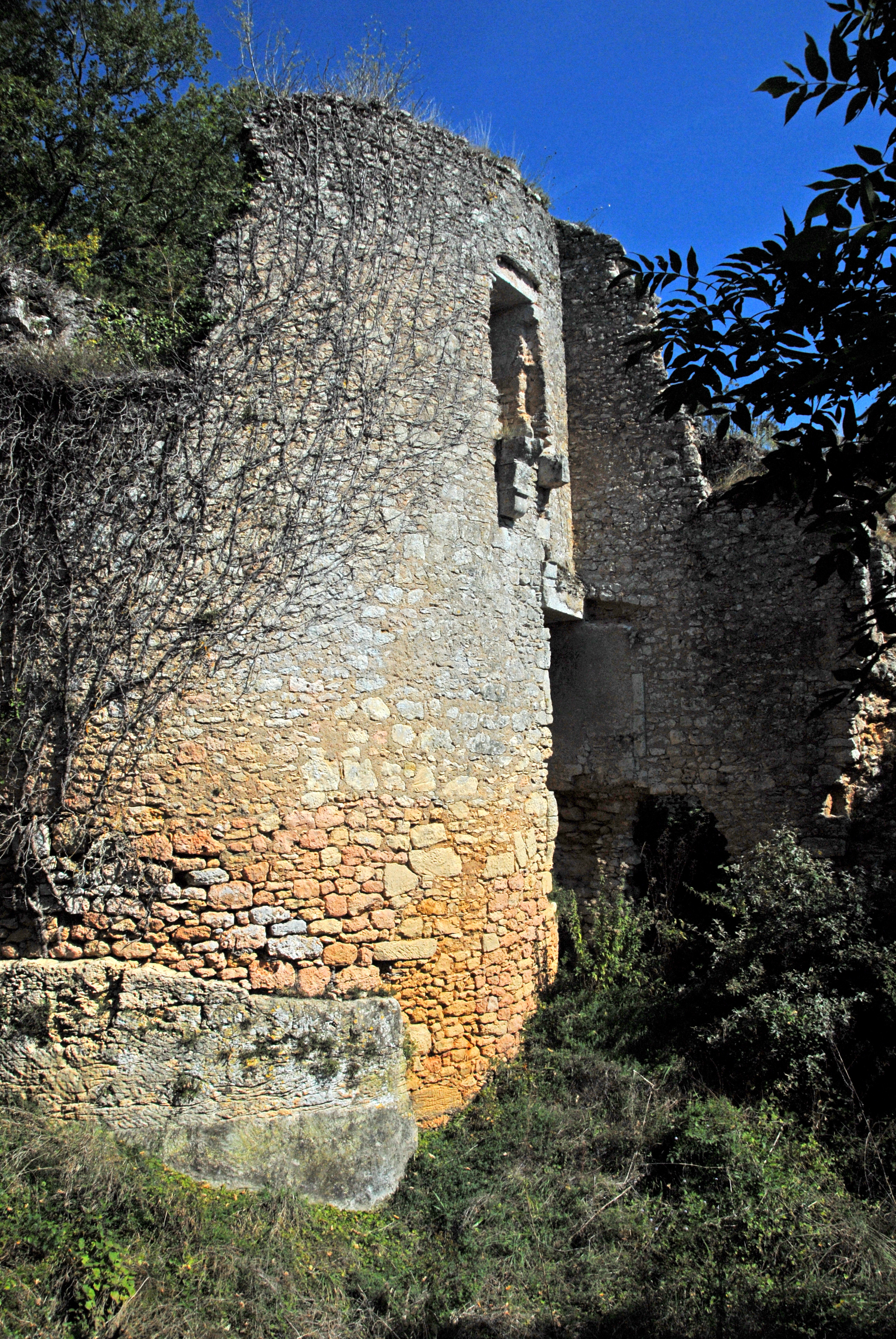

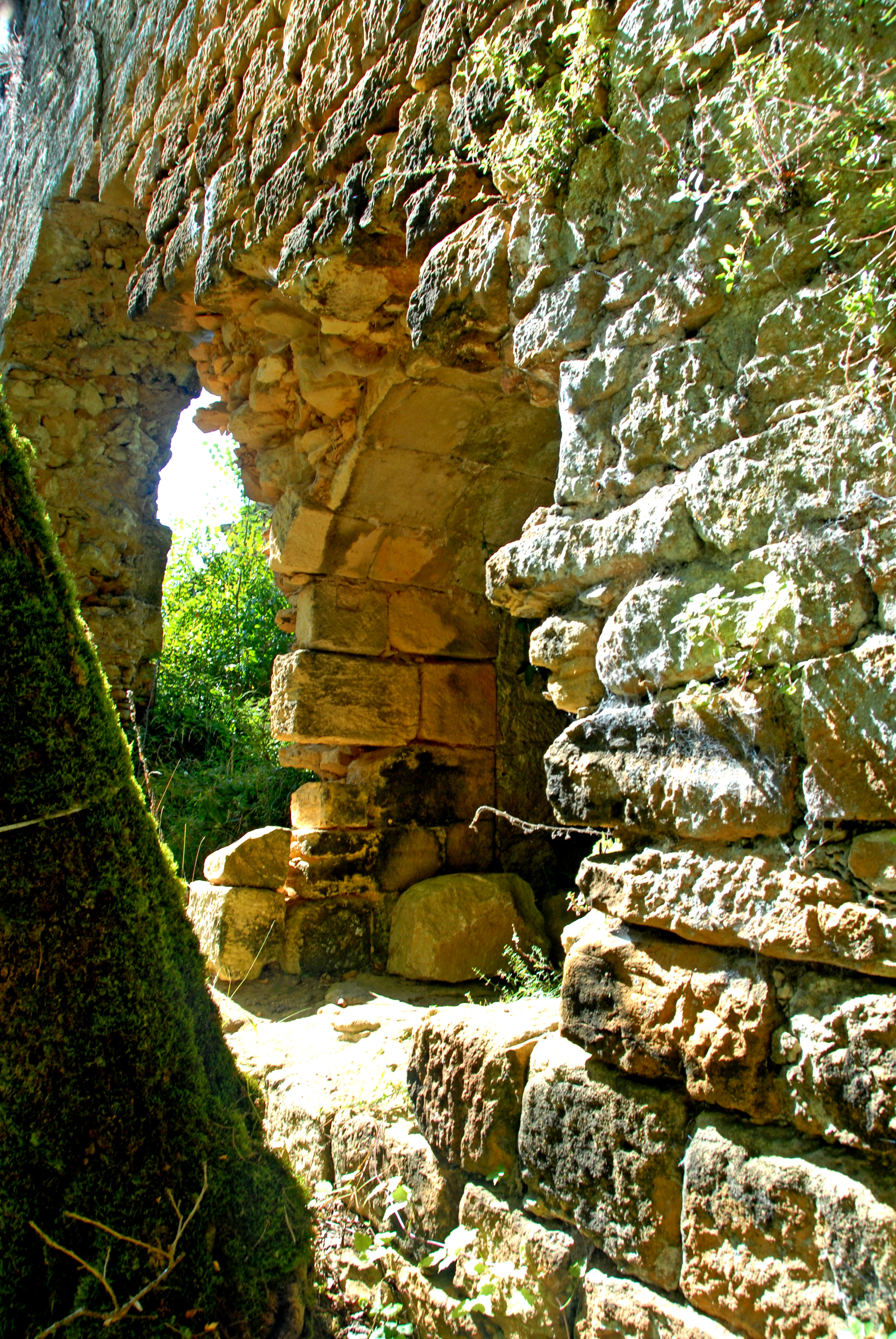

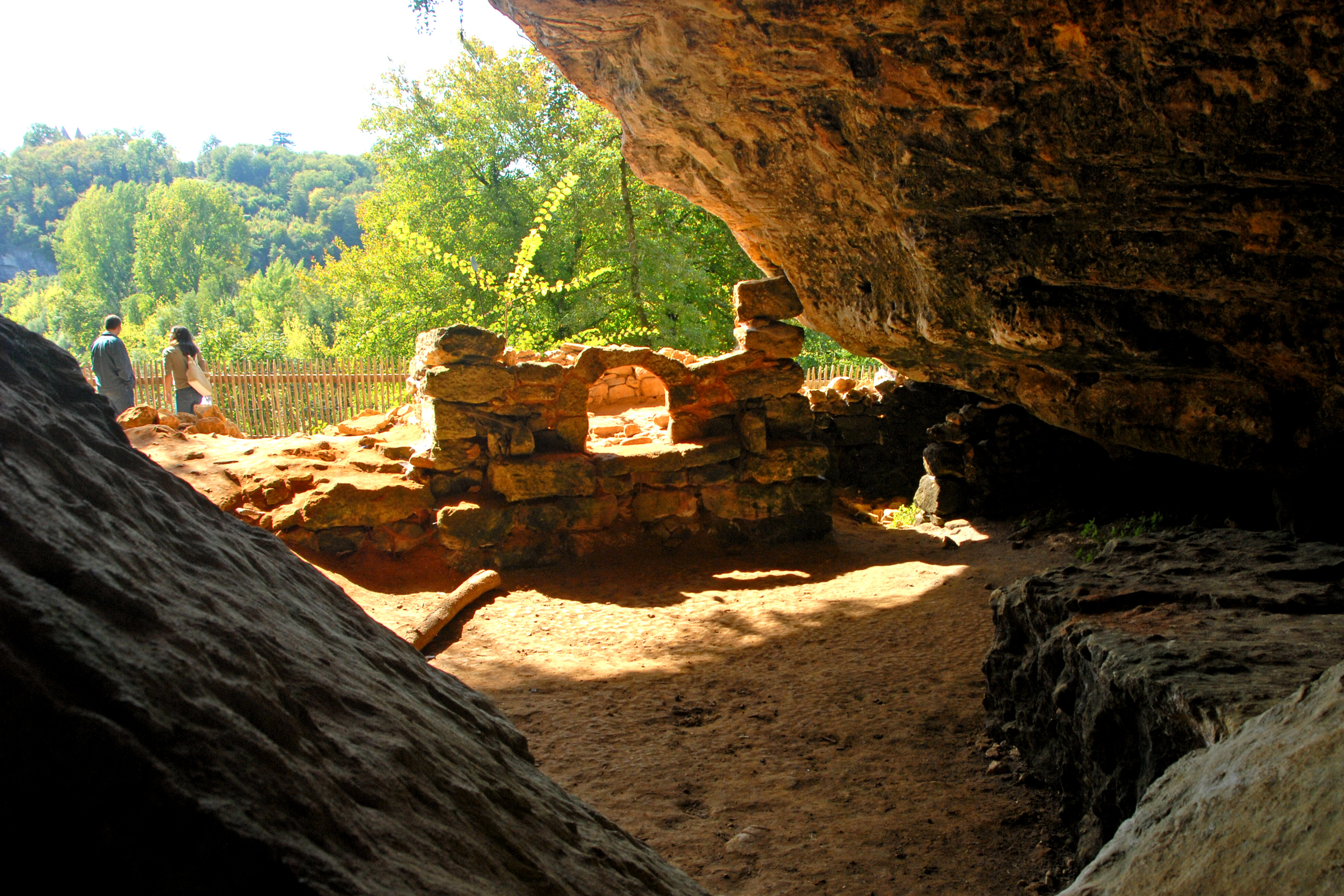

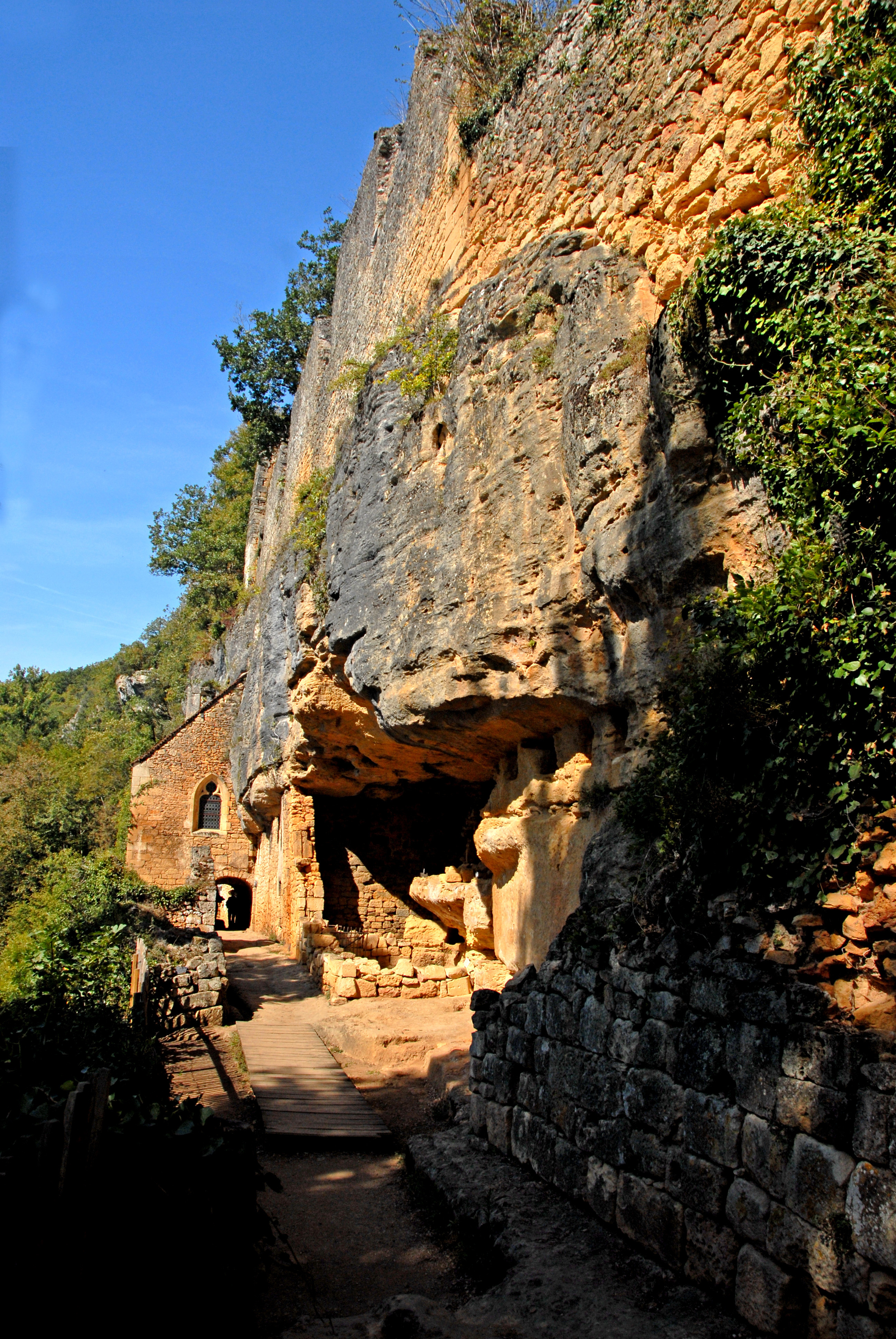

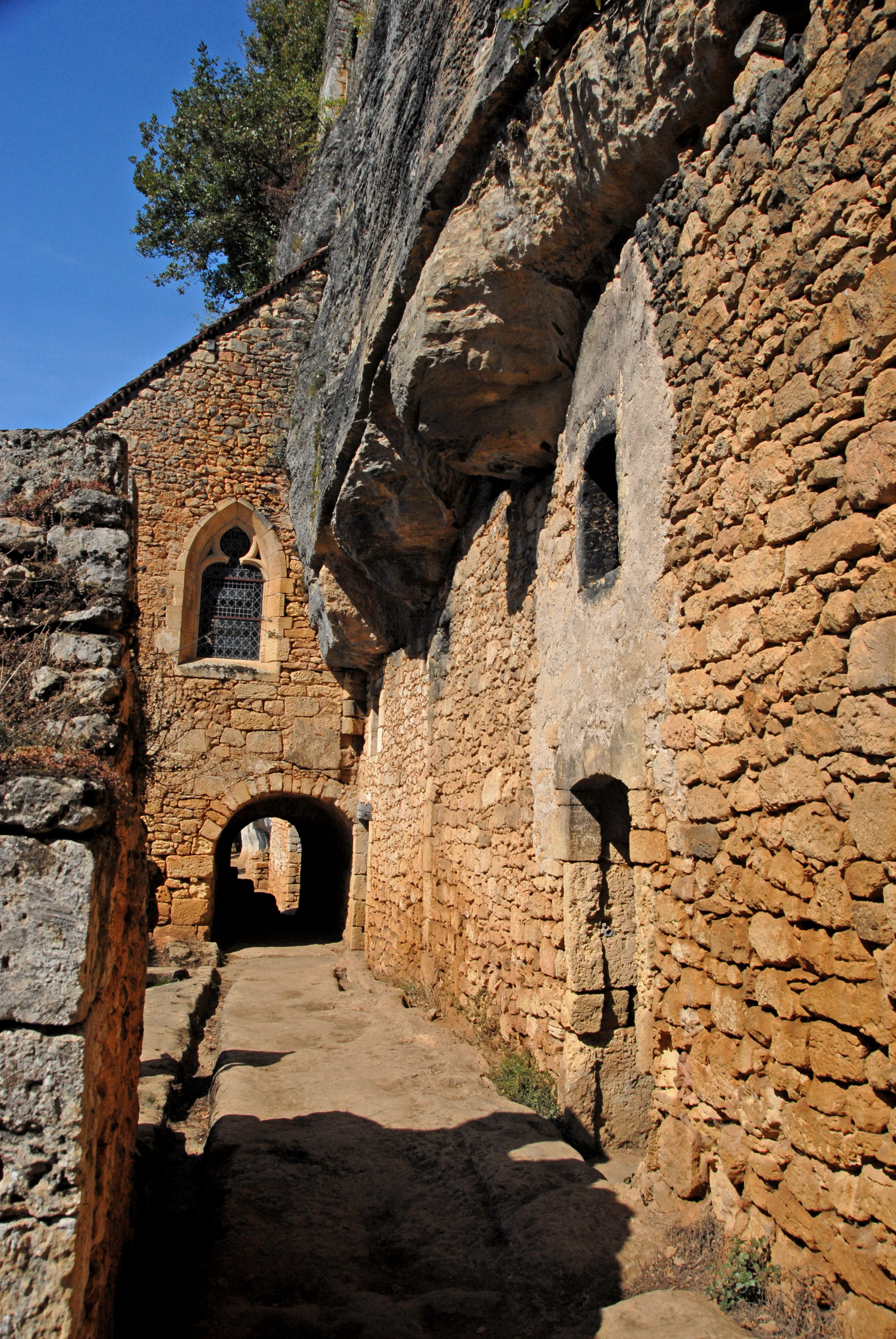
