= Samuel Holt (weaver) =

Weaver, Inventor and Manufacturer

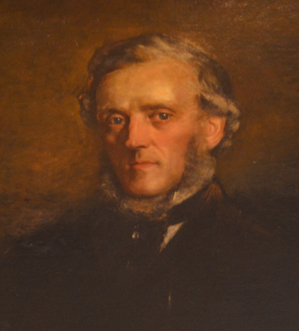
Samuel Holt c.1850

Samuel Holt (7 February 1811 – 16 September 1887) was a British weaver, inventor and industrialist who emigrated to the United States in later life.

He started work aged 7 in a Manchester print works, rising to become a manager and superintendent in the textile industry. He invented a loom to produce Turkish towels (Terry towels), and later established his own company in the US.

== Life ==
Samuel Holt was born 7 February 1811 in Taunton, Ashton-under-Lyne, Lancashire, England. At the age of seven he started work at Otho Hulme & Sons print works in Droylsden. Two years later, his father John Holt apprenticed him to work with him in the cotton and silk weaving side of Otho Hulme & Sons business, where he worked until he was twenty-five.

In 1834, he had joined W M Christy & Co., at Hillgate Mill, Stockport, which manufactured hats and later branched into cotton. Four years later he rose to be manager and superintendent of the firm's Fairfield mill. In the 1840s Henry Christy, the brother of Holt's employer, visited Ottoman Turkey. There he observed ladies hand-weaving Turkish Towels in the Harem of the Sultan. Being an avid ethologist he obtained a swatch of the material and brought it back to England. On his return home he gave it to his brother, Richard Christy, who recognized its sales potential if it could be produced. Christy asked Samuel Holt, his foreman, to look into the possible machine manufacture of the material. Holt succeeded and had his first machine running in 1848, and by 1851, a second design using two warps on a loom, one of which formed the looped surface and reproduced the unique pile of the handmade item.

Holt patented his invention which would soon bring terry cloth into mass manufacture for the first time and within the price range of average people. The first examples of the Turkish towelling(which were knotted by his wife Ann) were displayed at the Great Exhibition at Crystal Palace, London, where it caught the eye of Queen Victoria. The exhibition awarded Samuel Holt a gold medal. Queen Victoria was so impressed with the soft towels that on 14 April 1851, she gave an order for six-dozen towels, and granting the new product the endorsement as "Royal Turkish Towels". Samuel Holt's employers quickly turned to mass production of the soft toweling cloth and made a deal for Holt's patents. In 1860 Holt assigned his invaluable patents over to W M Christy & Co for a yearly annuity of £30.

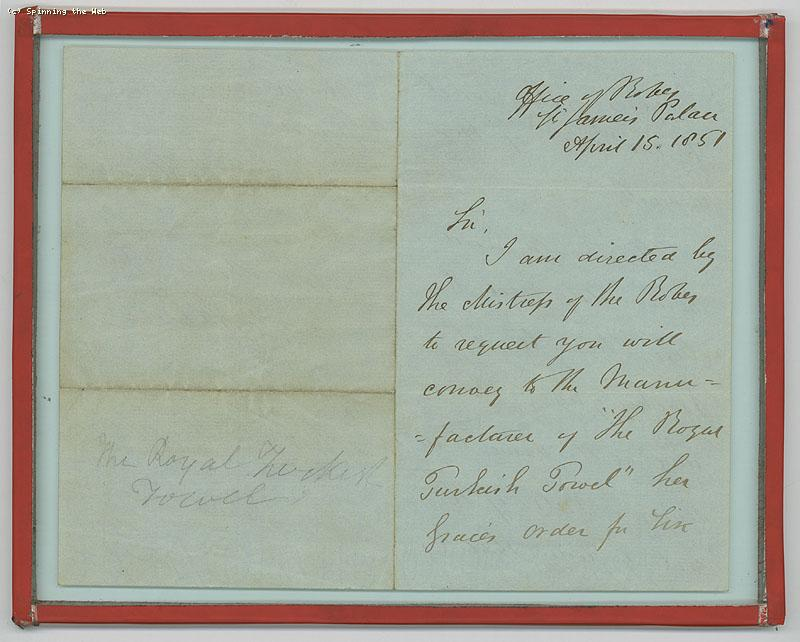
Order from the Royal Household for towels

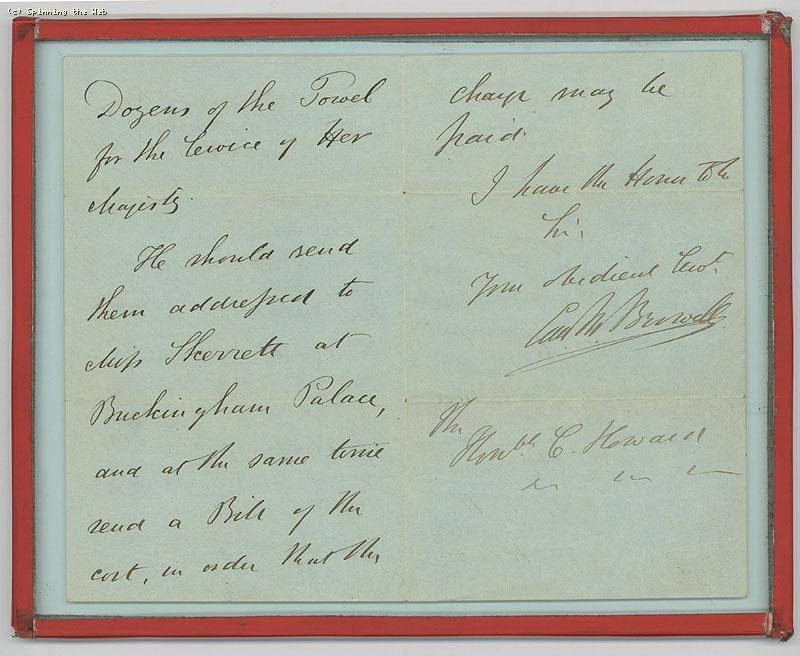
Order from the Royal Household for towels

In 1864, Holt was persuaded by a Charles A. Buckley to emigrate to the USA. Samuel Holt left his employer of thirty years and travelled to America, where he helped build and set up the American Velvet Company. Holt brought with him 20 – 30 experienced hands (some family members) from Ashton-under-Lyne.

He first worked at a mill on Bank Street, Newark, New Jersey until The American Velvet Company Mill was built on Essex and Madison, Paterson, New Jersey and which still stands today. By 1866-67, the firm took some of Holt's other patents and sold them for $250,000 but soon ran into lawsuits and the partnership failed. Newspapers of the time reported that Holt had taken heavy loss in the legal battle, but in an article written by his son William Holt in Textile World Journal, he stated that “my father never lost a fortune or any part of one in business”.

He continued as Samuel Holt & Co. The company prospered and he soon employed 30 operatives making Turkish towels, silks, velvet and plushes. His next mill was the Franklin Mill built (1871) in Paterson, New Jersey, and when that burnt down he built a mill (1872) for himself in the rear of his residence at 108 Straight Street, Paterson New Jersey. The mill was, thirty-two by fifty-two feet, three stories high. From 1870 to 1879 his half-brother, Robert Holt, was in partnership with him. The firm changed to Samuel Holt & Sons, - Samuel Holt, Jr., and William Holt being the younger members

In 1914, his grandson, Samuel Holt Jr., carried on the business.

== Personal life ==
Holt first married in 1833, Elisabeth Hibbert, of Taunton, Ashton-under-Lyne, who died in 1841, leaving two sons, John, b. 1834 and James, b. 1836, both of whom stayed in England. His second wife was Ann Aspinall, whom he married in 1847, and who died in Paterson, December 3, 1881, leaving three children, — Samuel, b. 1848, William, b. 1855, and Mary Ann (Annie) b. 1857.

The Holt family were a Christian family following the Swedenborgian faith.

=== Patents attributed to Samuel Holt ===
- 24 March 1851 – improvement in the manufacture of textile fabrics UK Patent No. 13572
- 24 September 1851 – Certain improvements in the manufacture of textile fabrics. Irish Patent
- 15 November 1852 – improvement in weaving cut piled fabrics. Patent No. 761
- 11 April 1855 – improvement in weaving plush or piled fabrics. Patent No. 801
- 13 January 1859 – a new or improved manufacture of woven silk fabrics. Patent No. 122
- 7 March 1865 – weaving pile fabric US Patent 46754.
