= William Miller Christy =

English Quaker hat and textile

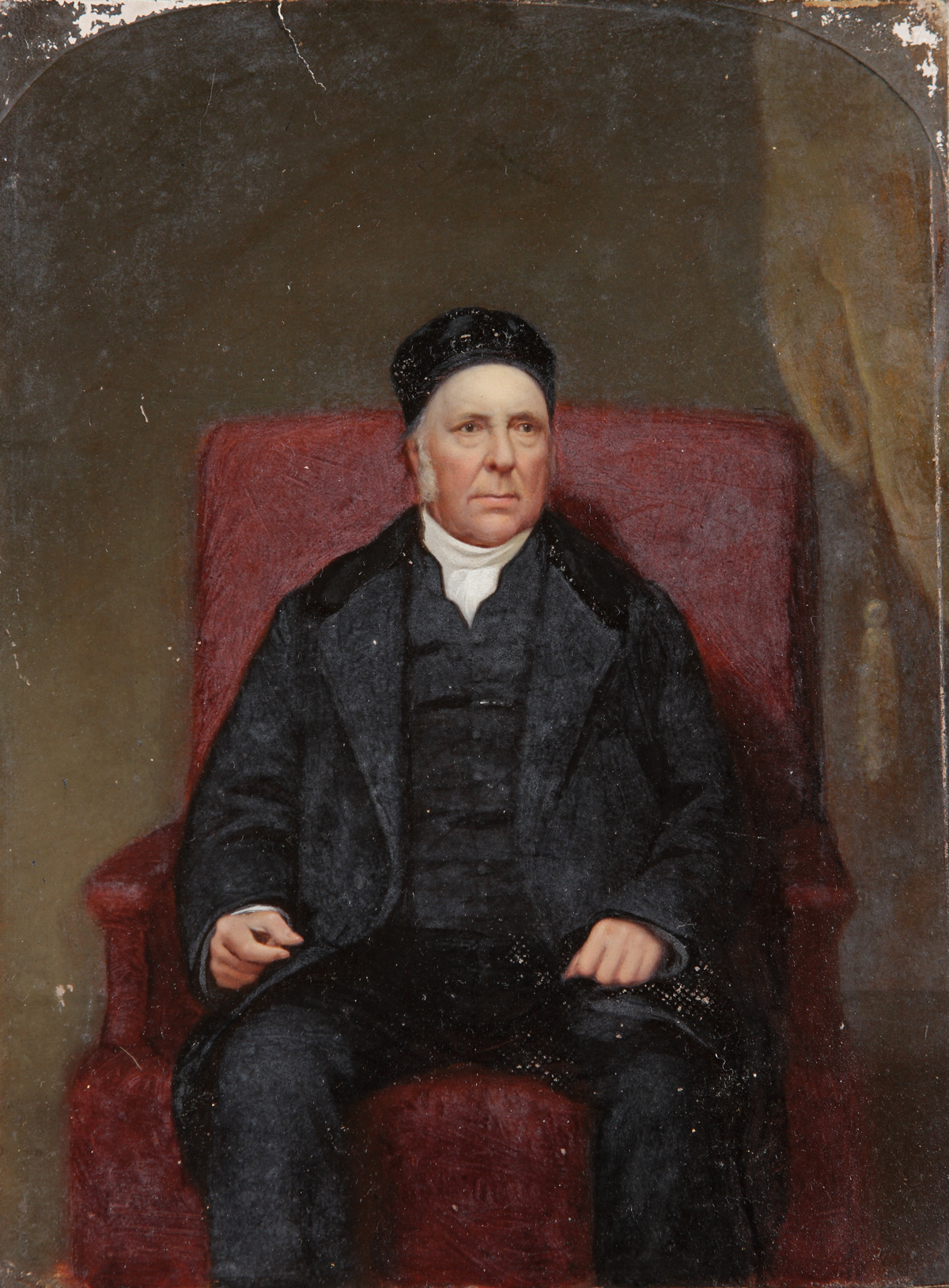
William Miller Christy

William Miller Christy (1778–1858) was an English Quaker hat and textile manufacturer, known also as a banker. He is credited with the invention of the penny receipt-stamp.

== Life ==
He was the second son of Miller Christy (1748–1820) and Ann Rist. The Christy family had a hat-making business at 35 Gracechurch Street, and Christy himself was apprenticed to a hatter.

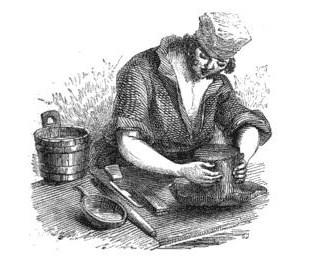
Female worker at Christy's hat factory, 1843

The firm developed manufacturing interests in Bermondsey and Stockport, and Christy was a founder of the London Joint Stock Bank. In 1824 he was a founder of Christy, Lloyd & Co, the Stockport and East Cheshire Bank, with Isaac Lloyd and two other partners. The immediate challenge of the panic of 1825 was handled with the support of Hanbury & Co., the bank's London associates.

The bank was sold in 1829, and Christy acquired capital, with which he entered the cotton business, in Stockport and then Droylsden. The enterprise later made a major success of the Christy towel. In 1841 the Christy Bermondsey works was reputedly the largest manufacturer of hats in the world and had 500 employees; silk coverings for hats were made in Stockport, and the factory there had more workers. The business dropped off later in the century, as the beaver hat went out of style.

== Family ==
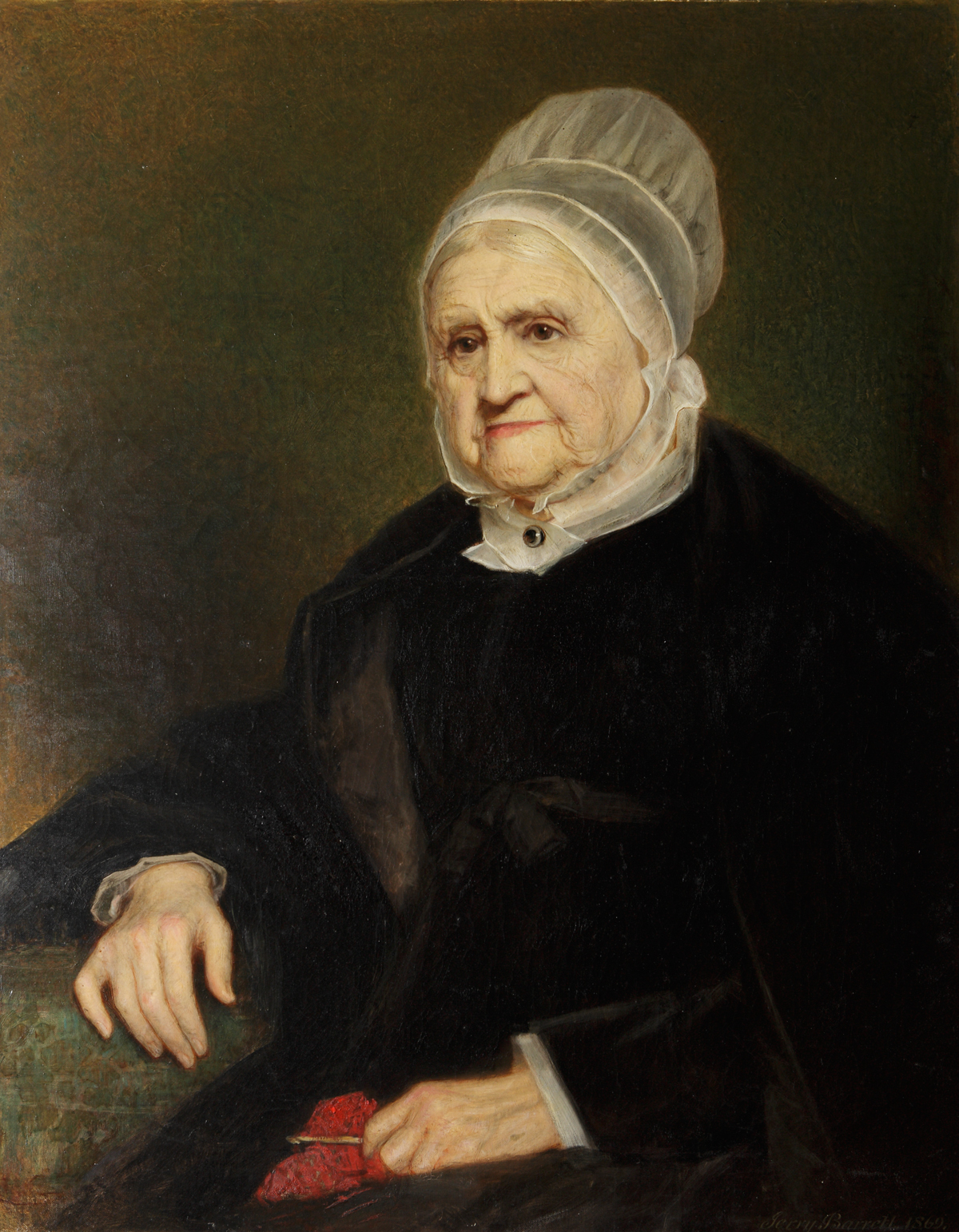
Ann Christy, 1869 portrait by Jerry Barrett

Miller married Ann Fell, and they had seven sons and three daughters. The second son was Henry Christy. His nephew Samuel Christy-Miller MP (a son of his older brother Thomas) was the eventual heir of their relative William Henry Miller MP, a first cousin of his father Miller Christy.
