= Tursac =

- Commune
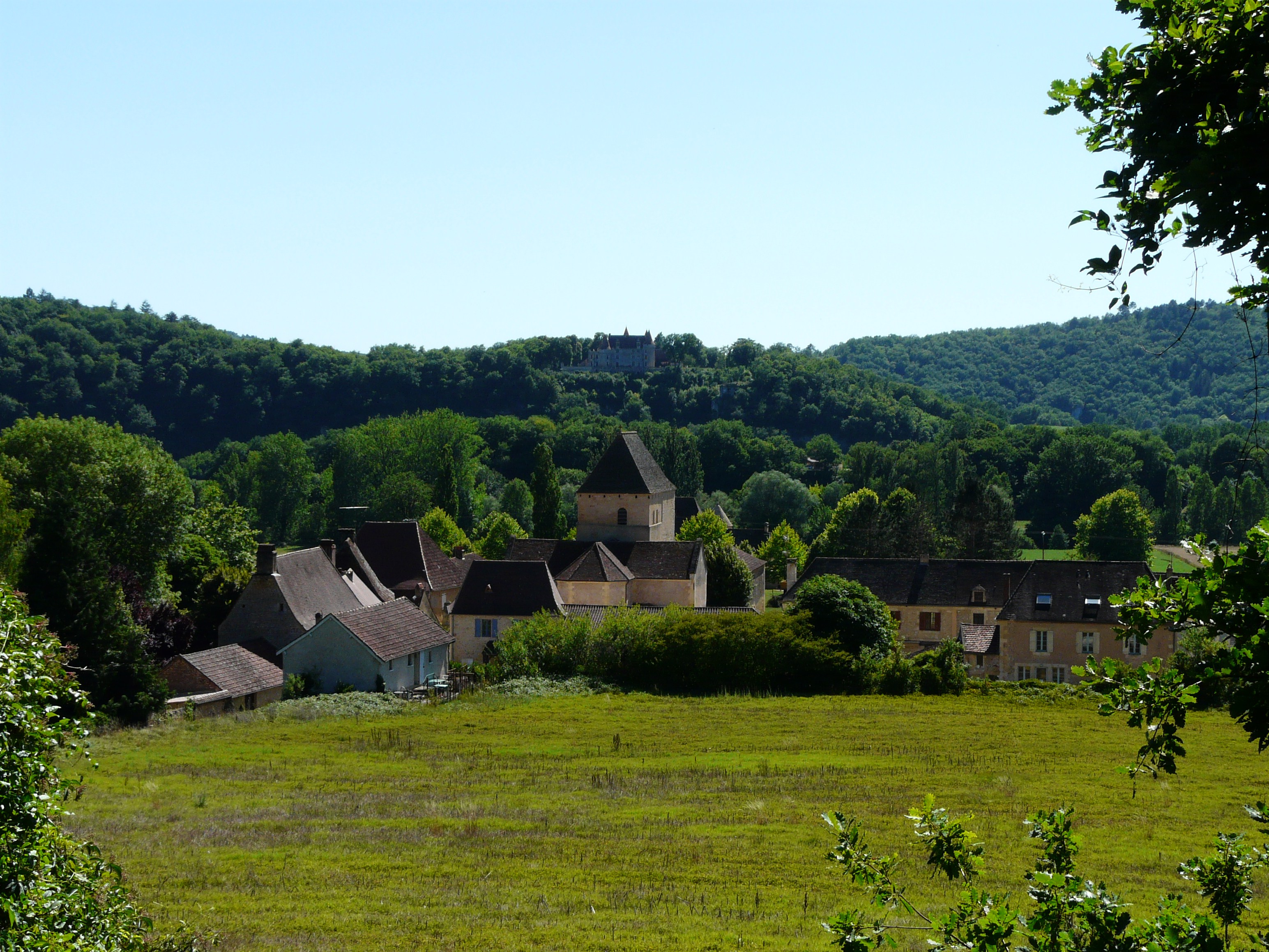
- A general view of Tursac

- Coat of arms
- Location of Tursac
- Location within France Location within Nouvelle-Aquitaine
- Coordinates: 44°58′12″N 1°02′43″E
- Country: France
- Region: Nouvelle-Aquitaine
- Department: Dordogne
- Arrondissement: Sarlat-la-Canéda
- Canton: Vallée de l'Homme

Government
  - Mayor (2020–2026): Michel Talet
- Area^{1}: 17.71 km^{2} (6.84 sq mi)
- Elevation: 79 m (259 ft)
- Highest elevation: 237 m (778 ft)
- Lowest elevation: 56 m (184 ft)
- Population (2023): 346
  - Density: 19.5/km^{2} (50.6/sq mi)
- Time zone: UTC+01:00 (CET)
  - Summer (DST): UTC+02:00 (CEST)
- INSEE/Postal code: 24559 /24620
- ^{1} French Land Register data, which excludes lakes, ponds, glaciers > 1 km^{2} (0.386 sq mi or 247 acres) and river estuaries.

Tursac (French pronunciation: [tyʁsak]) is a commune in the Dordogne department in Nouvelle-Aquitaine in southwestern France. Abri de la Madeleine is the site of Magdalenian prehistoric finds.

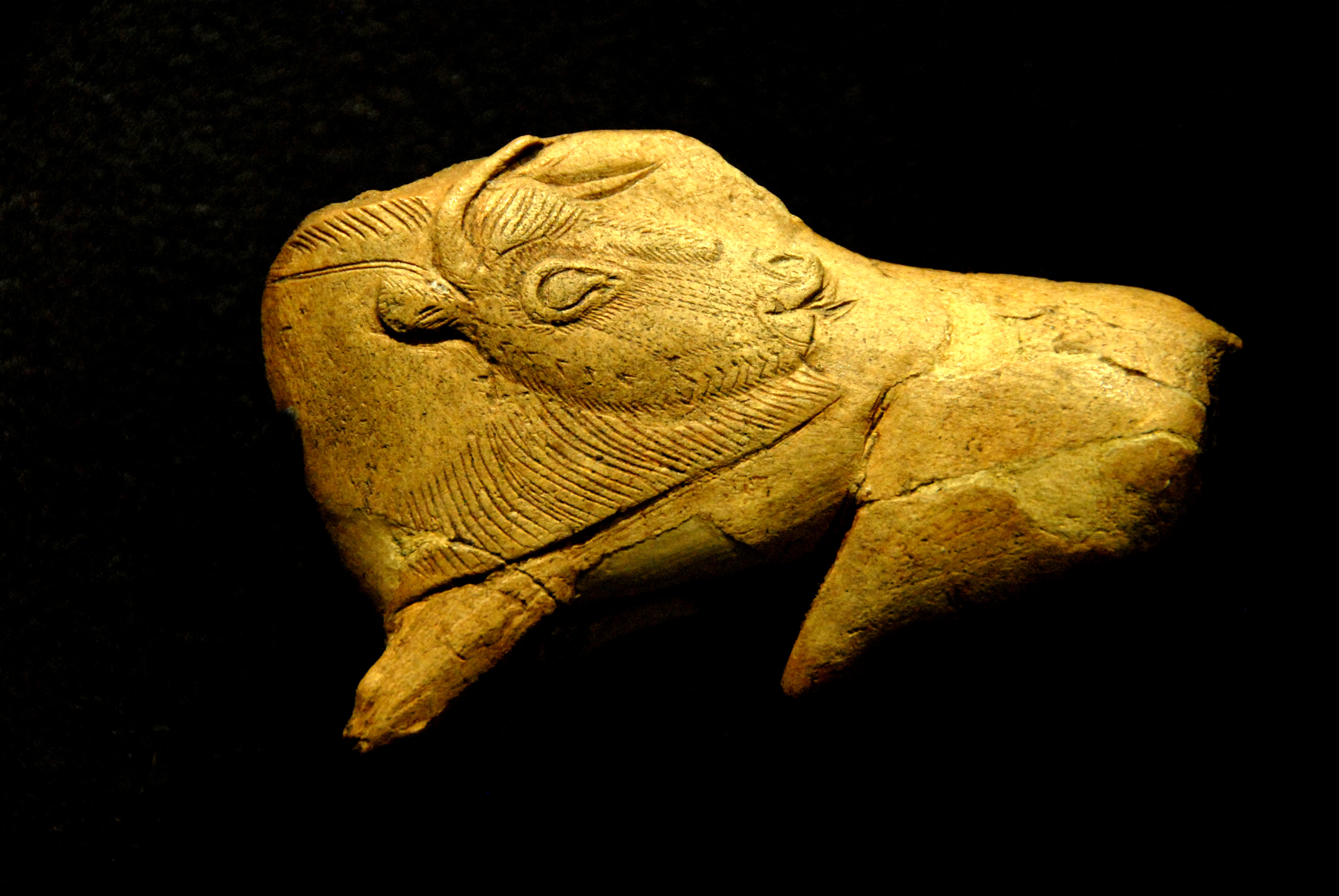
Prehistoric artifact found at La Madeleine in Tursac

== Population ==
Historical population
Year	Pop.	±% p.a.
1968	217	—
1975	238	+1.33%
1982	263	+1.44%
1990	316	+2.32%
1999	340	+0.82%
2007	321	−0.72%
2012	338	+1.04%
2017	339	+0.06%
2023	346	+0.34%
Source: INSEE

== See also ==
- Communes of the Dordogne department
