= Henry Christy =

British banker and collector (1810–1865)

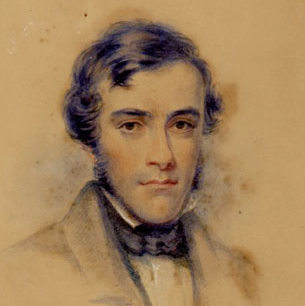
- Born: 26 July 1810; Kingston upon Thames
- Died: 4 May 1865 (aged 54)
- Occupation: Banker
- Employer: London Joint-Stock Bank
- Known for: Ethnographic collection, British Museum

Henry Christy (26 July 1810 – 4 May 1865) was an English banker and collector, who left his substantial collections to the British Museum.

== Early life ==
Christy was born at Kingston upon Thames, the second son of William Miller Christy of Woodbines, a Quaker banker who started out in hat manufacture with interests in Stockport, before becoming a financier.

Trained to business by his father, Henry Christy became a partner in the house of Christy & Co. in Gracechurch Street, and succeeded his father as a director of the London Joint-Stock Bank. He was still a board member of the bank at the end of his life, despite other activities. Henry contributed to the success of the family firm, known as W. M. Christy & Sons Ltd. once his father took it over. Samples of textiles he brought home from the Ottoman Empire provided the idea for looped cotton towelling, taken up by his brother Richard, and amenable to mechanical manufacture with a technique devised by an employee, Samuel Holt. Christy also innovated with woven silk rather than beaver for the manufacture of top hats.

== Interests ==
Christy was a philanthropist, active in the Great Famine and other causes. With other Quakers Christy took the approach of buying seeds for other vegetable crops, to reduce the potato monoculture. With committee members Robert Forster and Samuel Fox, he also lobbied the government for practical help in improving Irish fisheries. He was one of the founders of the Aborigines' Protection Society. In 1857 he visited, with Lord Althorp and John W. Probyn, the Elgin settlement of free blacks in Ontario, writing afterwards to its founder William King, and giving money. He was also a committee member of the British and Foreign School Society.

Christy was also involved in numerous learned societies. He belonged to both the Ethnological Society of London and the Anthropological Society of London, representing different strands arising from early ethnology. He became a Fellow of the Linnean Society in 1856, and joined the Geological Society in 1858. He took part in both the archaeological societies of the period, and the Royal Geographical Society. He was also a Fellow of the Society of Antiquaries of London, and sponsored the application for membership there of Augustus Lane Fox (later Pitt Rivers), the other major British collector of the time in the ethnographic field.

== Travels and collecting ==
In 1850 Christy began to visit foreign countries. Among the fruits of his first expedition to the East were an extensive collection of Eastern fabrics, and a large series of figures from Cyprus, which are now in the British Museum.

After the Great Exhibition of 1851, Christy began the study of tribal peoples. In 1852, and again in 1853, he travelled in Denmark, Sweden, and Norway. The public collections of antiquities at Stockholm and Copenhagen were a revelation to him, and from this time he collected objects from contemporary and prehistoric periods. The year 1856 was devoted to America. Travelling over Canada, the United States, and British Columbia, Christy met Edward Burnett Tylor in Cuba, and they went on together to Mexico, where Christy made many purchases. Their Mexican travels were described by Tylor in his Anahuac (London, 1861).

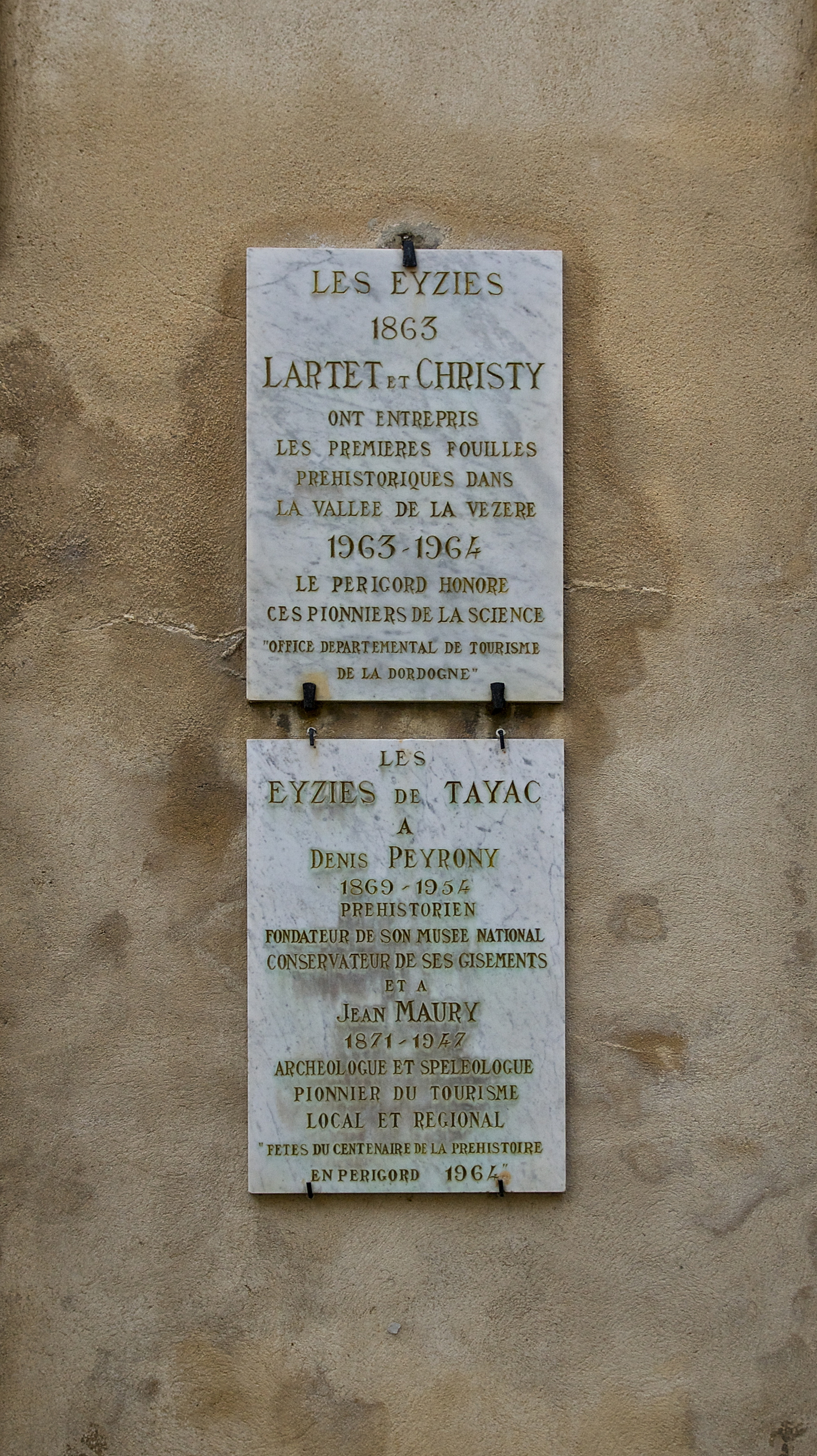
Plaques in tribute to Edouard Lartet and Henry Christy, Les Eyzies de Tayac, Dordogne, France.

In 1858, the antiquity of man was proved by the discoveries of Boucher de Perthes on flint implements in France; Christy joined the Geological Society that year. He went with the French palæontologist Edouard Lartet in the examination of the caves along the valley of the Vézère, a tributary of the Dordogne, in the south of France. Remains are embedded in the stalagmites of these caves. Thousands of specimens were obtained, some of them being added to Christy's collection. The sites they investigated included Le Moustier, the Abri de la Madeleine, both important type sites.

== Death ==
In April 1865, Christy left England with a small party of geologists to examine some caves which had recently been discovered in Belgium, near Dinant. While at work he caught a severe cold. A subsequent journey with M. and Mme. Lartet to Lapalisse brought on inflammation of the lungs, of which he died on 4 May 1865.

== Collections and legacy ==
By his will, Christy bequeathed his collections of modern objects to the nation; his archaeological collection went to the nation, but with the finds from excavations in France to be shared with the French Musée d'Archéologie Nationale, which was to get the most important pieces. He also left £5000 which established the Christy fund that allowed the British Museum to purchase many more artefacts; with a sum of money to be applied to public exhibition. As there was then no spare room at the British Museum, the trustees secured the suite of rooms at 103 Victoria Street, London SW (in which Christy himself had lived) and here the collection was exhibited, under the care of A. W. Franks, until 1884. The young Charles Hercules Read, later Franks's successor as Keeper at the British Museum, was based there doing the cataloguing, in his first work for the museum. In that year the removal of the natural history department to South Kensington made room for the collection at the British Museum.

Christy had a partial catalogue of his collections made in 1862, by Carl Ludvig Steinhauer. In 1864 he wrote an account of the work which was being carried out at his expense in the Vézère Valley; these notices appeared in the Comptes rendus (29 February 1864) and Transactions of the Ethnological Society of London (21 June 1864). They referred mainly to the "reindeer period", as the time of the cavemen in southern France then came to be styled. Christy's funding contributed to the discovery of Cro-Magnon man in 1868 in a cave near Les Eyzies. An account of the explorations appeared in a half-finished book left by Christy, entitled Reliquiae Aquitanicae, being contributions to the Archaeology and Paleontology of Périgord and the adjacent provinces of Southern France; this was completed by Christy's executors, first by Lartet and, after his death in 1870, by Thomas Rupert Jones.
