= Tayac =

Tayac may refer to:

== People ==
- Gabrielle Tayac, American historian and curator
- Sébastien Tayac (born 1975), French gymnast
- Turkey Tayac, legally Philip Sheridan Proctor (1895–1978), American activist

== Places ==
- Les Eyzies-de-Tayac-Sireuil, Dordogne, France
- Tayac, Gironde, France

== Other ==
- Château de Tayac, Dordogne, France
