= Jean-Pierre Buffi =

Franco-Italian architect

- Born: February 16, 1937 (age 89); Florence, Italy
- Education: Institut français d'architecture (French Institute of Architecture)
- Occupation: Architect

Jean-Pierre Buffi (February 16, 1937, Florence, Italia) is a Franco-Italian architect.

== Biography ==
Jean-Pierre Buffi was born in Florence in 1937. He graduated from the Faculty of Architecture in Florence. He left Italy in 1964, moving to Paris to work with architect Jean Prouvé.

In 1979, together with Marianne Buffi, he founded an architecture and urban planning firm. The firm became Buffi Associés in 1995. Jean-Pierre Buffi has been responsible for numerous architectural projects, including the construction of IBM headquarters in Lille and Bordeaux, Collines de la Défense and Front de Parc de Bercy in Paris.

== Projects ==
- 1997: Avignon University
- 1998: Faculty of Medicine and Pharmacy, Rouen
- 1998: Stade Vélodrome, Marseille
- 2000: Sanofi-Synthélabo headquarters, Paris (quai de la Rapée)
- 2004: Médiathèque José Cabanis, Toulouse
- 2004: Musée national de Préhistoire, Les Eyzies
- 2007: Nouveau Grand Bazar (Lyon)
- 2008: Iride thermal power plant, Turin
- 2013: Immeuble Le Cinq, Bordeaux
- 2016: Gaumont Convention Cinema, Paris
