= National Museum of Prehistory (France) =

Coordinates: 44.93596°N 1.013464°E

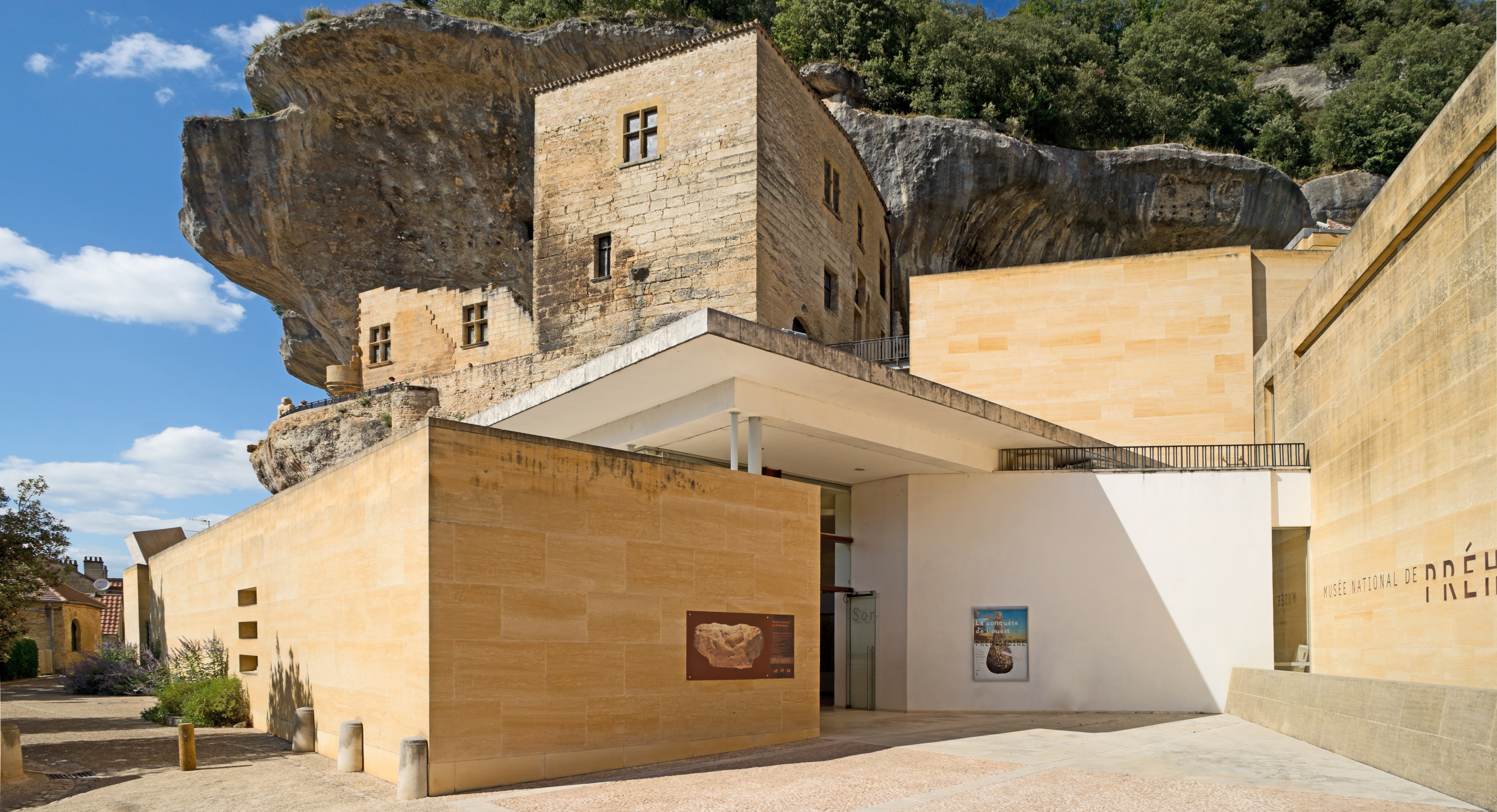
- Established: 1918
- Location: Les Eyzies-de-Tayac-Sireuil, France
- Type: Museum of Prehistory
- Website: Official website

The National Museum of Prehistory (French: Musée national de Préhistoire) is a French institution founded in 1918 by Denis Peyrony in the commune of Les Eyzies-de-Tayac (now the commune of Les Eyzies), in the Dordogne. Officially inaugurated on September 30, 1923, it is housed in what was formerly the Château de Tayac, purchased for this purpose by the State in 1913. In 2004, a new museum, designed by Jean-Pierre Buffi, was inaugurated on the emblematic cliff face of Les Eyzies. It preserves a collection of 6,000,000 items.

== Presentation ==
The National Museum of Prehistory presents the prehistoric past in situ, and conserves some 6 million objects. A site museum avant la lettre, it is located in the Vézère Valley "museum site" which was declared a World Heritage Site by UNESCO in 1979 for the importance of its Paleolithic remains. It now houses one of France's most important Paleolithic collections: lithic and bone industry, art furniture, burials, fauna and the world's first collection of Paleolithic art on engraved or sculpted blocks.

The museum reveals the ancient traces left by humans in France. Stone tools, bone and ivory artefacts, life-size reconstructions of prehistoric humans and extinct animals, and an understanding of human evolution over the last 400,000 years are all showcased in a contemporary architectural setting.

== Extension ==
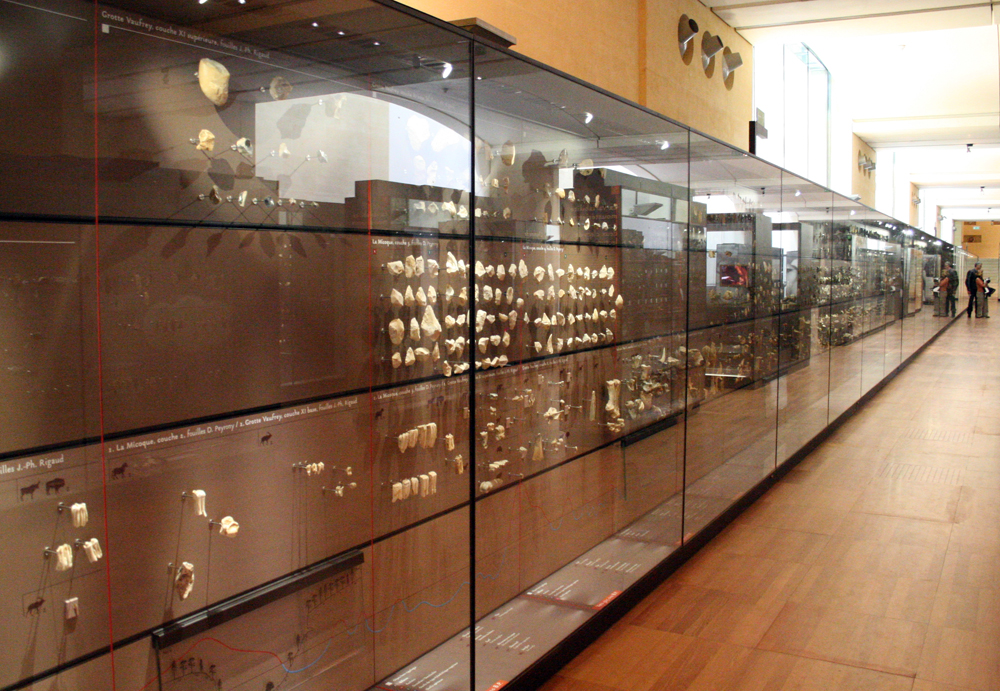

The new extension, completed in 2004, occupies new buildings designed by architect Jean-Pierre Buffi, with over 3,600 m2 of new floor space, including 700 m2 of exhibition galleries.

== Management ==
In December 2020, Nathalie Fourment, a doctorate in prehistory and specialist in the Upper Palaeolithic, became Director of the Museum, succeeding Jean-Jacques Cleyet Merle, Director for 32 years.

== Gallery ==
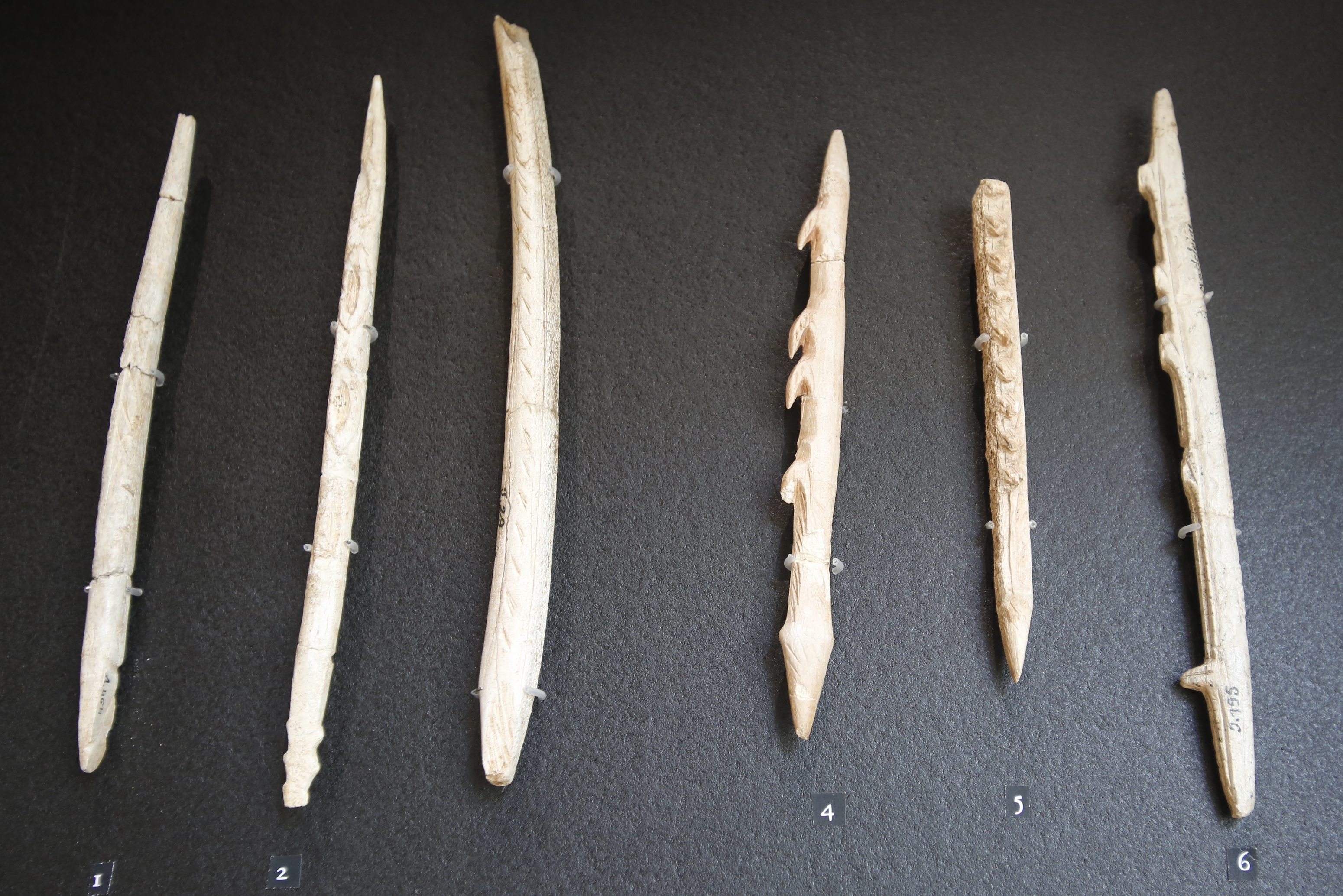
Set of bone carved harpoons and harpoons from La Madeleine, Les Marseilles and Fourneau-du-Diable

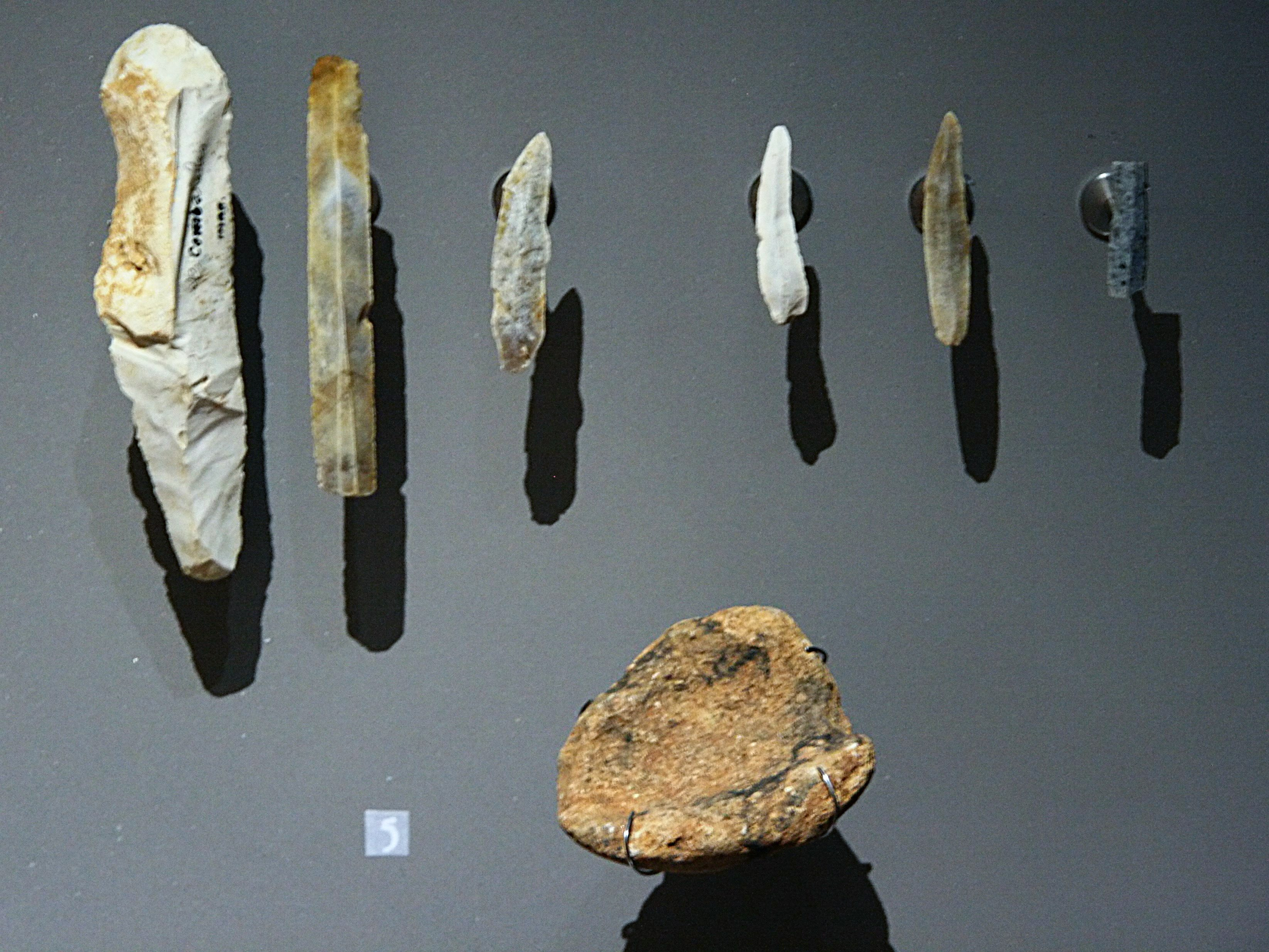
Set of Magdalenian lithic tools from Les Combarelles

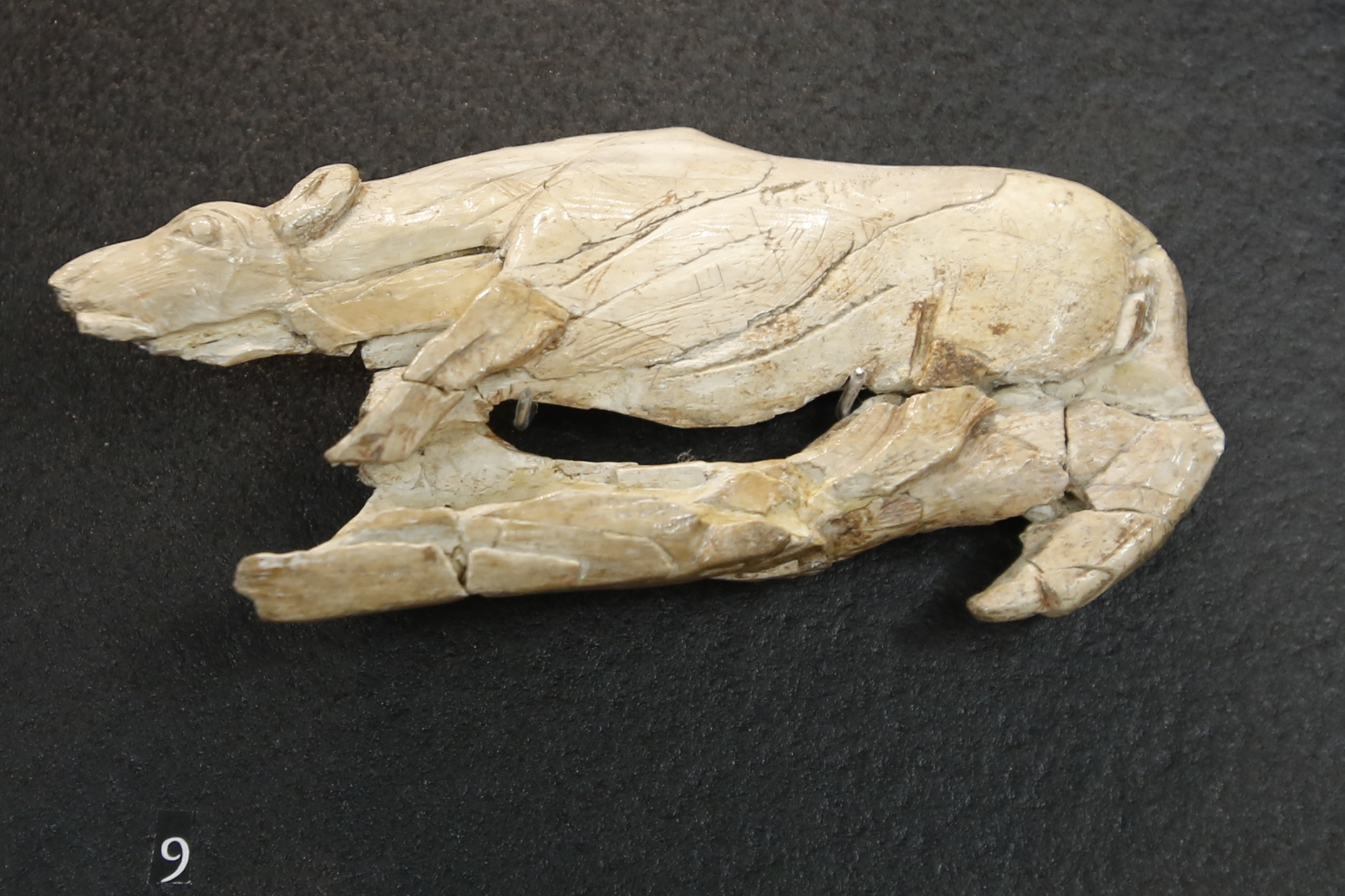
Magdalenian propellant carved in bone found at La Madeleine

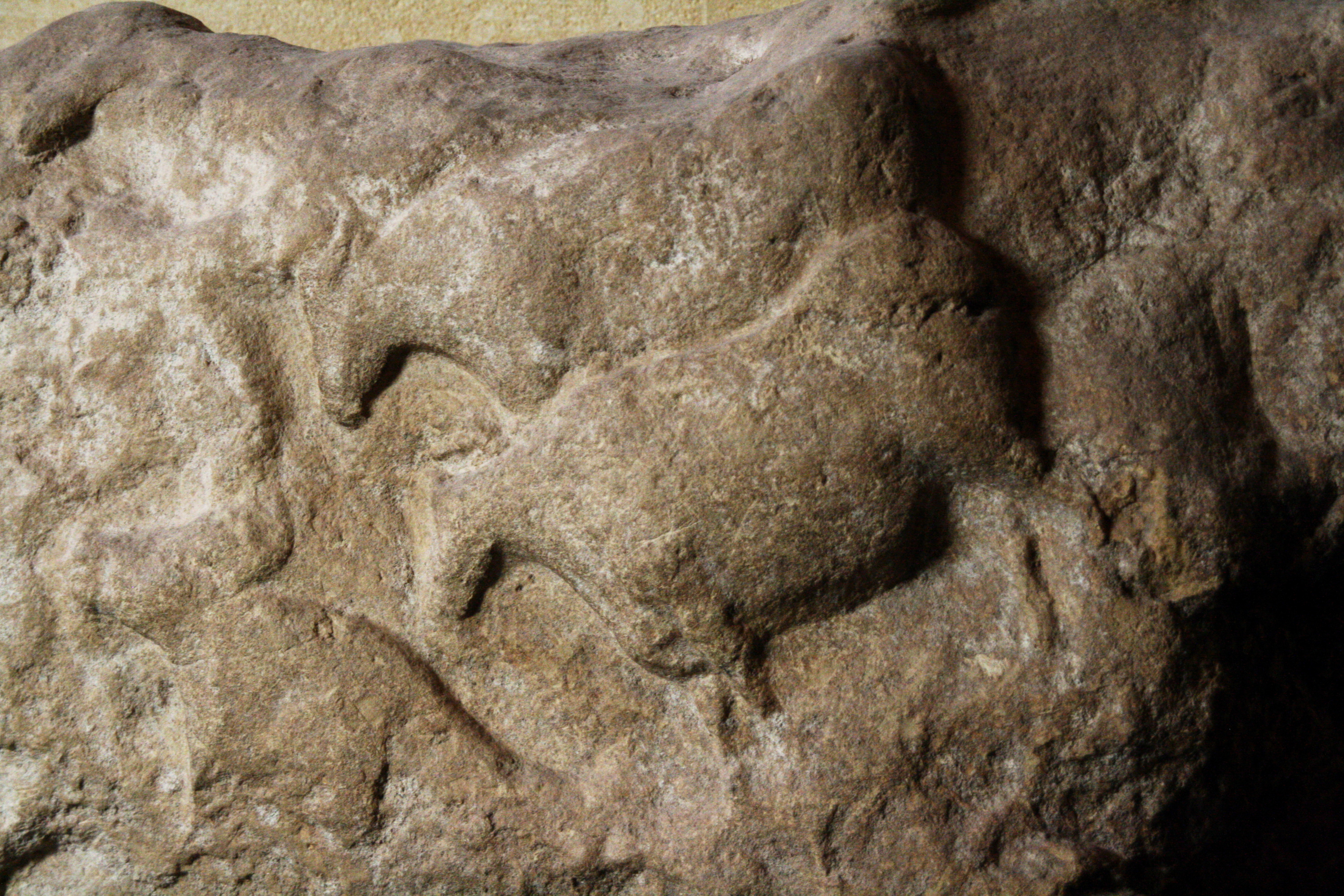
Solutrean rock art from Fourneau du Diable

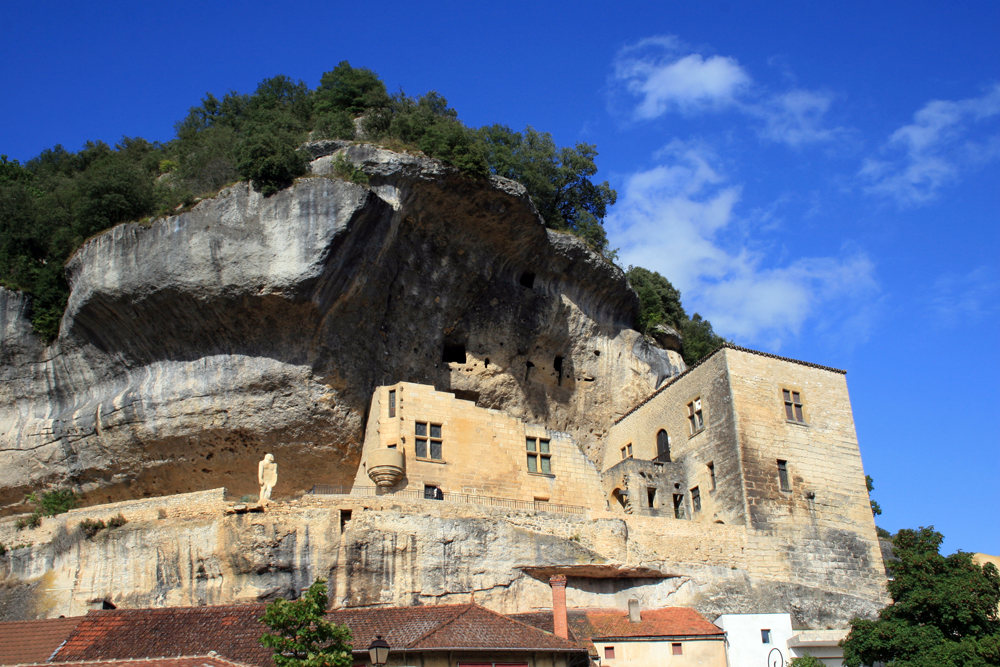
View of the exterior of the National Museum of Prehistory.

== Bibliography ==
- Blanc, Claude (1992). "Séverin BLANC, préhistorien (1893-1970)". Paléo, Revue d'Archéologie Préhistorique. 4 (1): 5–8. doi:10.3406/pal.1992.1186.
- Maurice Bourgon, « Le paléolithique ancien des plateaux au sud des Eyzies », dans Bulletin de la Société historique et archéologique du Périgord, 1939, t. 66, p. 550-569, 1940, t. 67 p. 57-68
- Maurice Bourgon, « Étude sur le Quaternaire aux environs des Eyzies (essai de chronologie) », dans Congrès préhistorique de France. Compte-rendu de la 11^{e} session. Périgueux. 1934, p. 312-317 (lire en ligne)
