= Saint-Cirq =

Saint-Cirq may refer to the following places in France:

- Saint-Cirq, Dordogne, a commune in the Dordogne department
- Saint-Cirq, Tarn-et-Garonne, a commune in the Tarn-et-Garonne department

== See also ==
- Saint-Cricq (disambiguation)
