= Saint-Cricq (disambiguation) =

Saint-Cricq is a commune in the Gers department, France.

Saint-Cricq may also refer to:

== Places ==
- Saint-Cricq-Chalosse, a commune in the Landes department
- Saint-Cricq-du-Gave, a commune in the Landes department
- Saint-Cricq-Villeneuve, a commune in the Landes department

== People ==
- Nathalie Saint-Cricq (born 1960), French journalist

== Other ==
- Lycée Saint Cricq, a public high school in Pau, France

== See also ==
- Saint-Cirq (disambiguation)
