= Manaurie =

- Part of Les Eyzies
- Location of Manaurie
- Location within France Location within Nouvelle-Aquitaine
- Coordinates: 44°57′40″N 0°59′31″E
- Country: France
- Region: Nouvelle-Aquitaine
- Department: Dordogne
- Arrondissement: Sarlat-la-Canéda
- Canton: Vallée de l'Homme
- Commune: Les Eyzies
- Area^{1}: 9.97 km^{2} (3.85 sq mi)
- Elevation: 78 m (256 ft)
- Highest elevation: 210 m (690 ft)
- Lowest elevation: 60 m (200 ft)
- Population (2023): 146
  - Density: 14.6/km^{2} (37.9/sq mi)
- Time zone: UTC+01:00 (CET)
  - Summer (DST): UTC+02:00 (CEST)
- Postal code: 24620
- ^{1} French Land Register data, which excludes lakes, ponds, glaciers > 1 km^{2} (0.386 sq mi or 247 acres) and river estuaries.

Manaurie (French pronunciation: [manoʁi]; Occitan: Manàuria) is a former commune in the Dordogne department in Nouvelle-Aquitaine in southwestern France. On 1 January 2019, it was merged into the new commune Les Eyzies.

== See also ==
- Communes of the Dordogne department
