= Château de Commarque =

Castle in Nouvelle-Aquitaine, France

Coordinates: 44°56′30″N 1°6′7″E

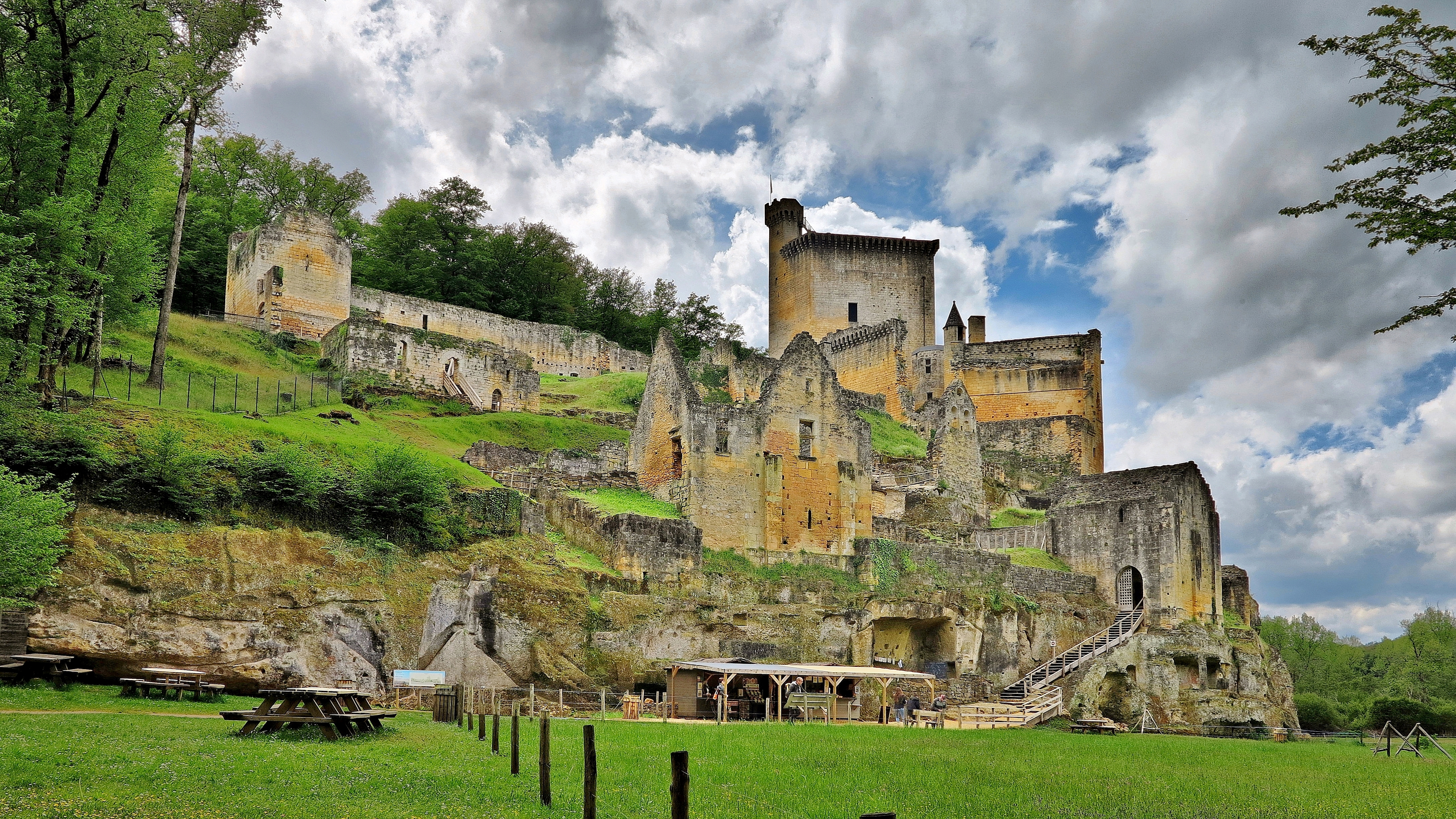
Château de Commarque

The Château de Commarque is a hillside castle located between Sarlat and Les Eyzies, in the commune of Les Eyzies in the Dordogne department in southern France. It stands on a rocky outcrop in the valley of the river La Beune in the Vézère valley region.

== History ==
The castle was founded during the 12th century, or possibly slightly prior to it, upon the request of the abbots of Sarlat. At this time the Château de Commarque was only a wooden tower, and its primary concerns were to protect the abbey, to discourage the ambitions of the Beynac family and to ensure the safety of the valley. It was placed at the crossing of two important commercial roads: the road from Périgueux to Cahors and the road from Brive-la-Gaillarde to Bergerac.

After the Beynac family took the control of the castle, the wooden tower was replaced by a stone keep. The fortification was enhanced, and the keep was gradually heightened until the 18th century. The Beynacs, lords of the area, dwelt in the keep.

During the Hundred Years' War, it was captured by the English who held the place for several years. Later during the French Wars of Religion, the castle was taken by the Catholics, due to the Beynacs being Protestant partisans.

Abandoned in the 18th century, the castle was bought in 1972 by Hubert de Commarque who began the rescue of the site. The castle has been undergoing restoration since 1994. It has been listed since 1943 as a monument historique by the French Ministry of Culture.

There is a prehistoric cave under the castle.

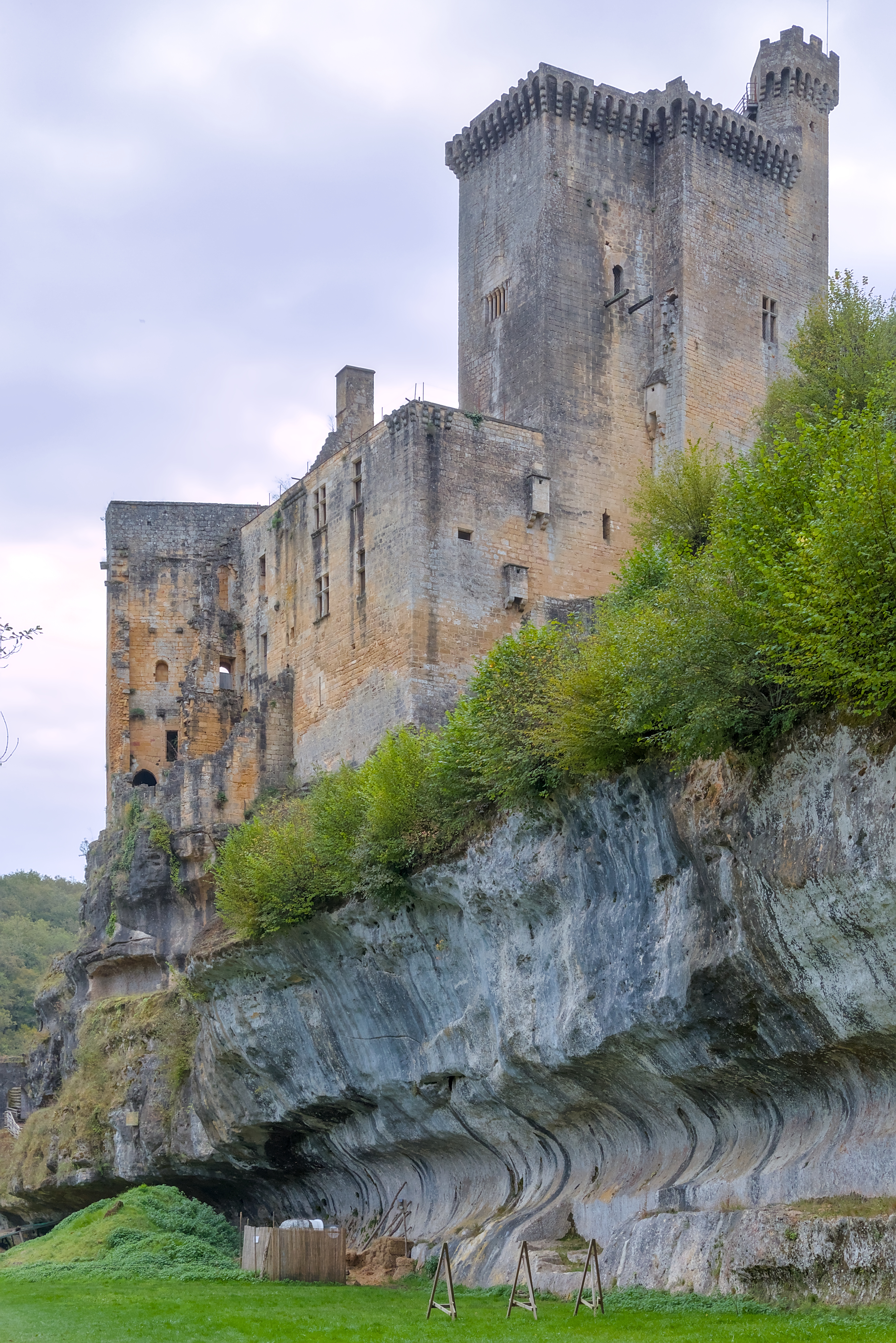
The castle.

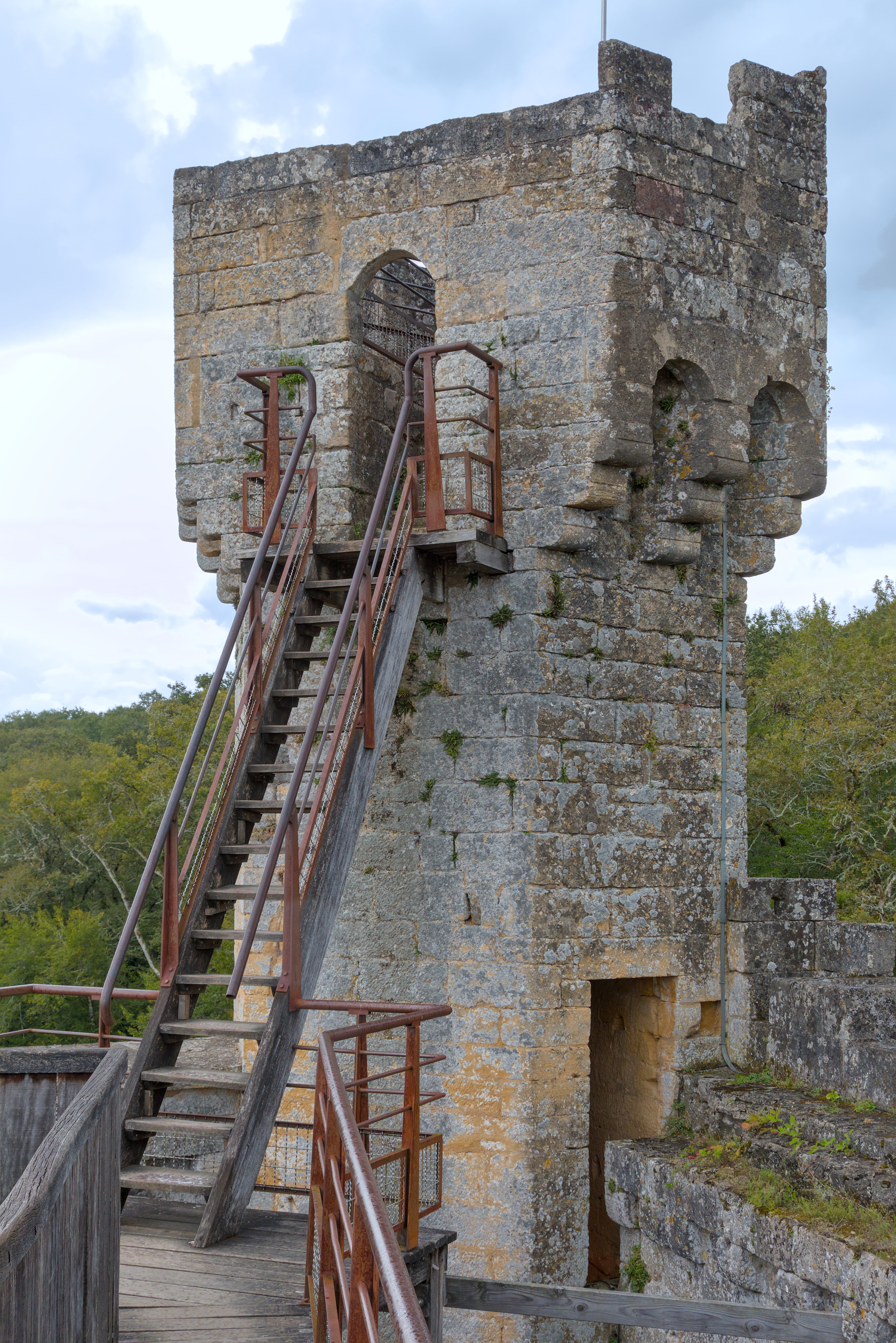
The keep's tower.

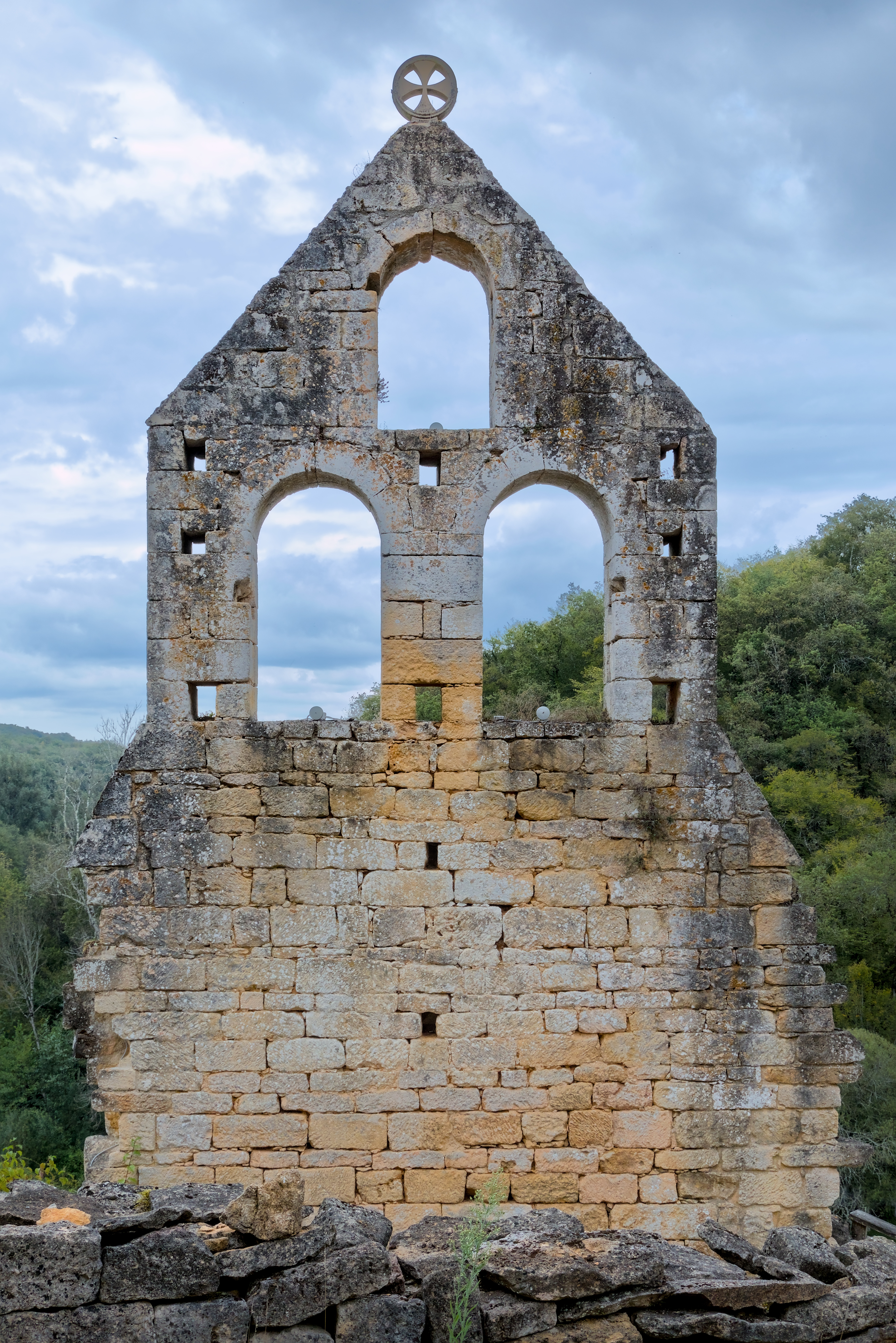
Façade of a ruined building, with the Knights Templar cross at the top.

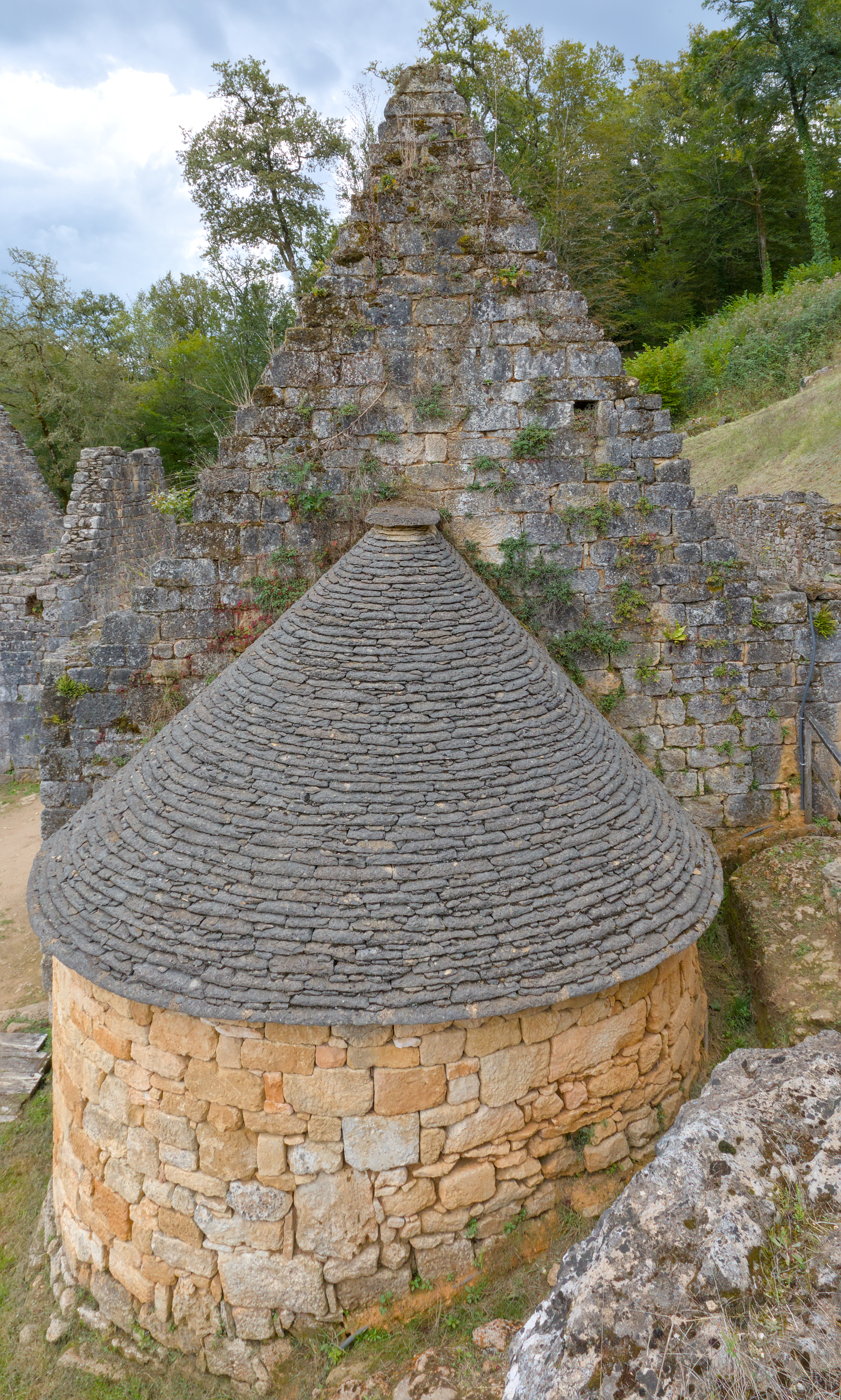
Oven's House and remains of a gable.

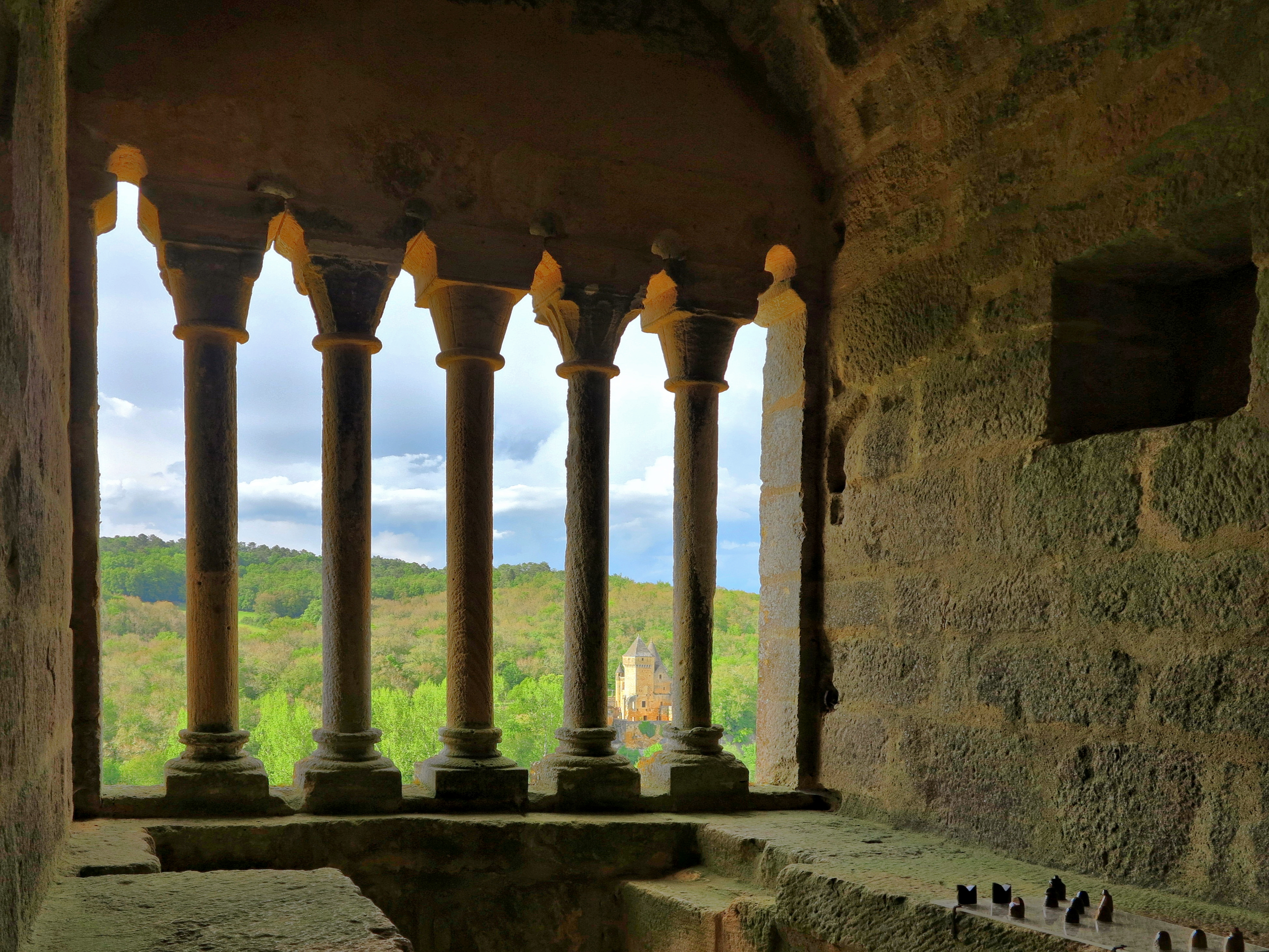
View of Laussel castle through a window in the keep.

== See also ==
- List of castles in France
- Château de Beynac
- The Duellists - filming location for the 1977 film by Ridley Scott
