= Micoquien =

Middle Paleolithic Tool Industry

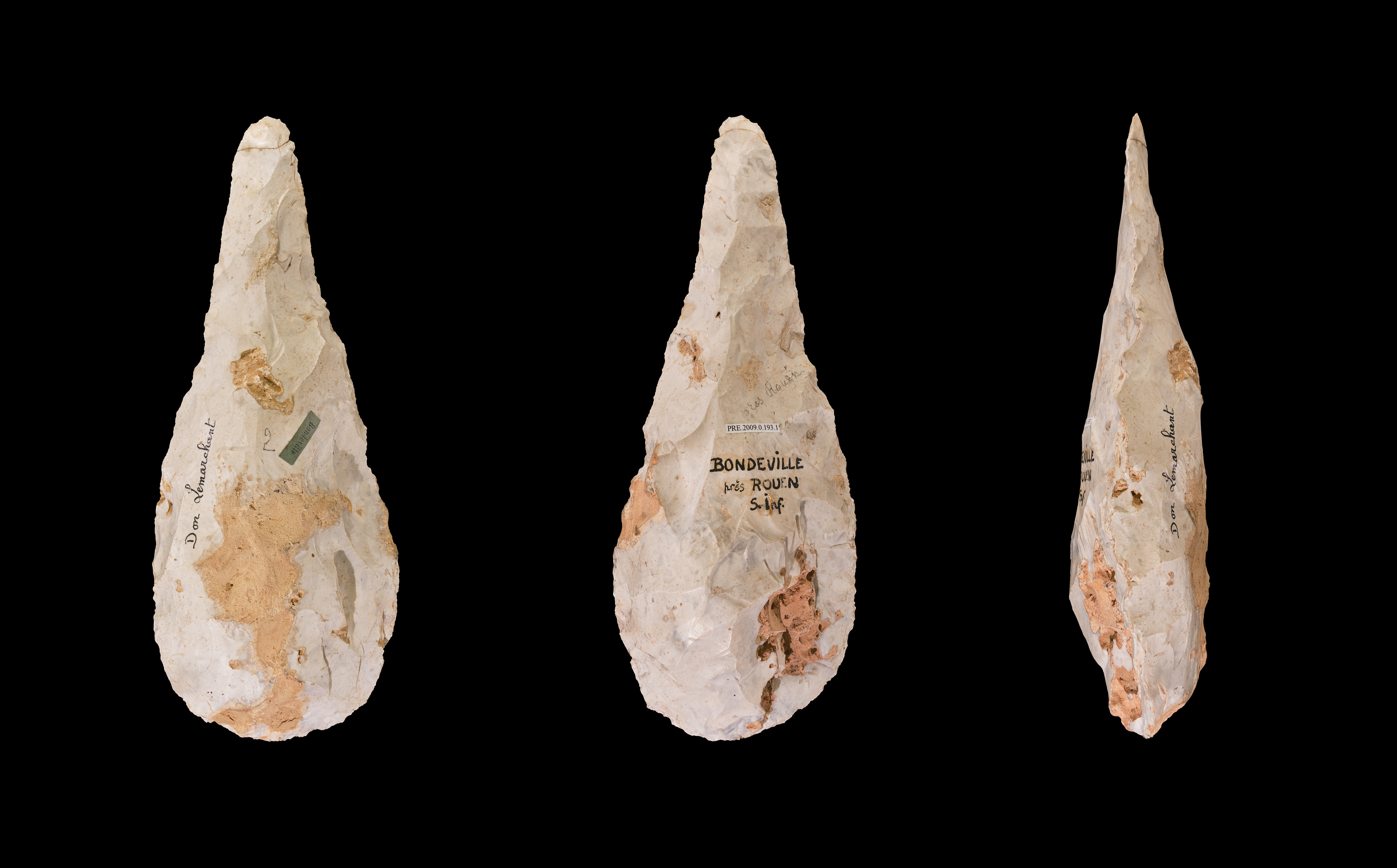
- Alternative names: Micoquain
- Geographical range: Europe
- Period: Middle Paleolithic
- Dates: c. 130,000 – c. 60,000 BCE (up to 22,000 BCE in some locations, notably in Ukraine)
- Type site: La Micoque
- Major sites: Balve Cave, Eem, Les Eyzies-de-Tayac-Sireuil
- Preceded by: Acheulean, Mousterian
- Followed by: Mousterian

Selected Micoquien sites from the ROAD database (CC BY-SA 4.0 ROCEEH)

The Micoquien is an early Middle Paleolithic industry, that is found in the Eemian and in an early episode of the Würm glaciation (about 130,000 to 60,000 BCE). The Micoquien is distinguished technologically by the appearance of distinctly asymmetrical bifaces. Its discoverer and namer was the archeologist and art trader Otto Hauser. Hauser then sold a great number of so-called Micoque-wedges that he found in excavations in La Micoque (in Les Eyzies-de-Tayac-Sireuil, Dordogne, France) to museums and collectors.

The specially formed handaxes from La Micoque exhibited an often rounded base. The problem with the term Micoquien is that later excavations have revealed an older time placement for the La Micoque axes, which are now dated in the Riss glaciation.

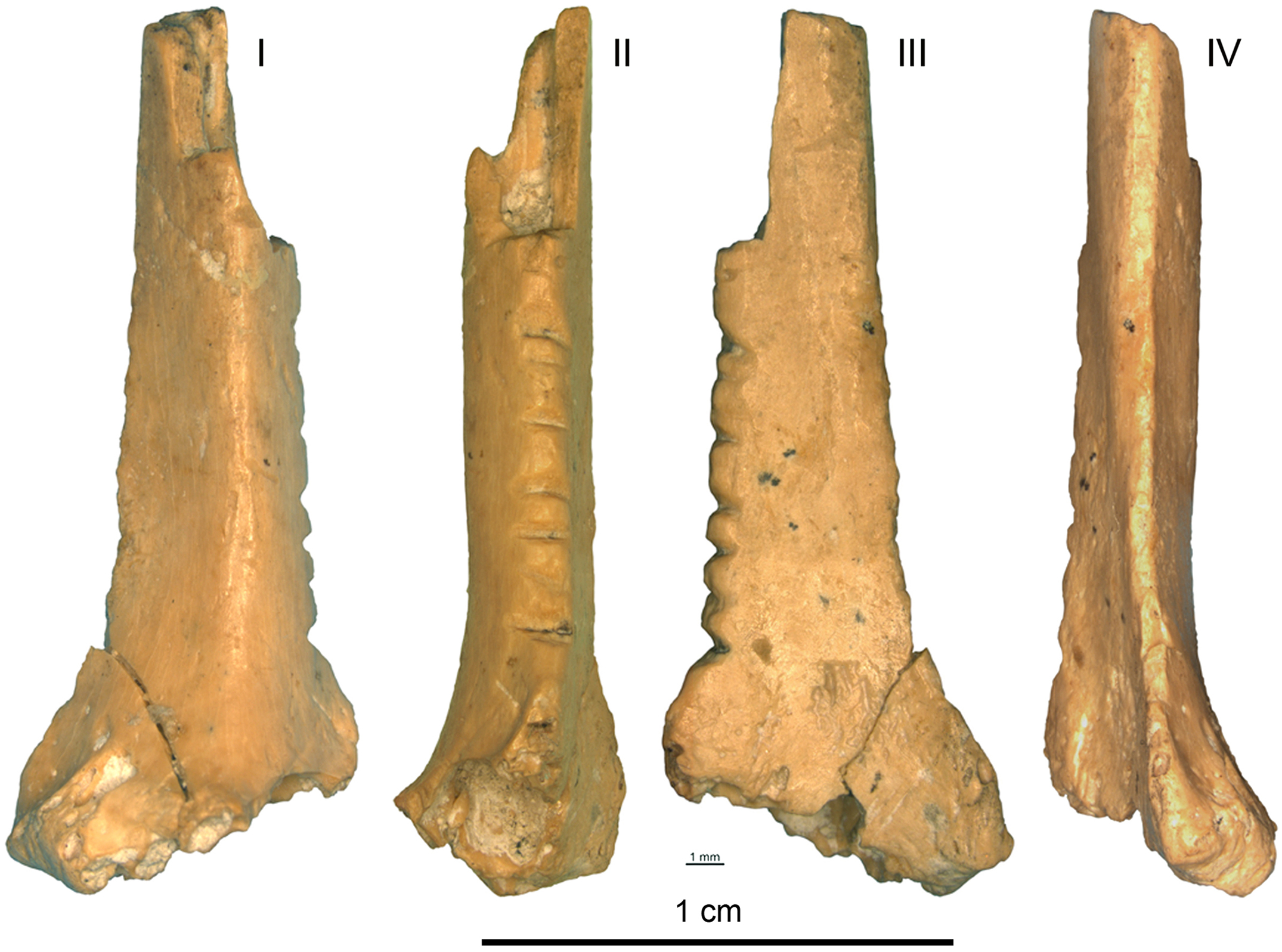
Incision-decorated raven bone from the Zaskalnaya VI (Kolosovskaya) Neanderthal site, Crimea, Micoquien industry dated to between cal. 43,000 and 38,000 BP

A wider artifact from the Micoquien is the Keilmesser (bifacially worked knife), which has a clearer chronology in Central Europe. From this, some archeologists have proposed substituting the term Keilmesser group for Micoquien.

Micoquien artifacts are distributed across all of Eastern Europe and Central Europe. In Germany, they can be found at Balver Höhle and Lonetal.
