= Les Eyzies-de-Tayac-Sireuil =

- Part of Les Eyzies
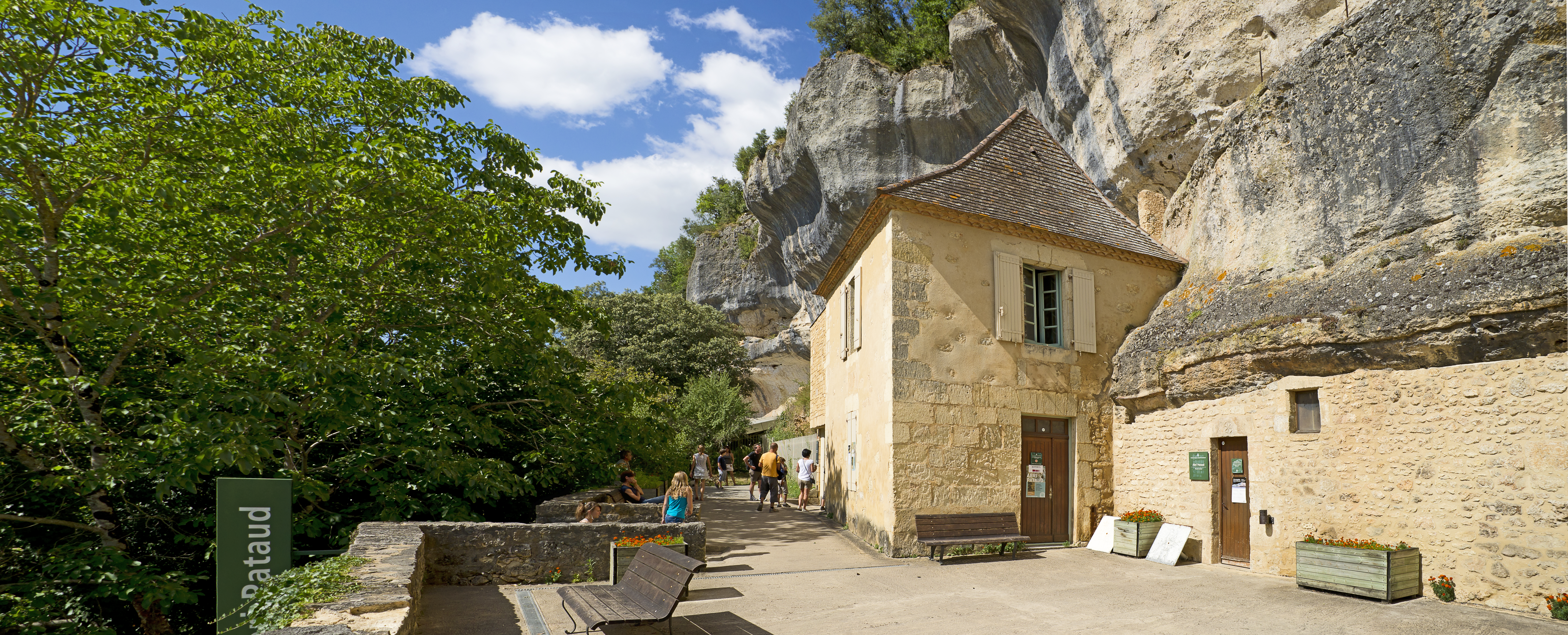
- Location of Les Eyzies-de-Tayac-Sireuil
- Location within France Location within Nouvelle-Aquitaine
- Coordinates: 44°56′10″N 1°01′05″E
- Country: France
- Region: Nouvelle-Aquitaine
- Department: Dordogne
- Arrondissement: Sarlat-la-Canéda
- Canton: Vallée de l'Homme
- Commune: Les Eyzies
- Area^{1}: 37.44 km^{2} (14.46 sq mi)
- Elevation: 74 m (243 ft)
- Highest elevation: 245 m (804 ft)
- Lowest elevation: 55 m (180 ft)
- Population (2023): 853
  - Density: 22.8/km^{2} (59.0/sq mi)
- Time zone: UTC+01:00 (CET)
  - Summer (DST): UTC+02:00 (CEST)
- Postal code: 24620
- ^{1} French Land Register data, which excludes lakes, ponds, glaciers > 1 km^{2} (0.386 sq mi or 247 acres) and river estuaries.

Les Eyzies-de-Tayac-Sireuil (French pronunciation: [le.z‿ezi də tajak siʁœj]; Occitan: Las Aisiás de Taiac e Siruèlh) is a former commune in the Dordogne department in Nouvelle-Aquitaine in southwestern France. It was created in 1973 by the merger of two former communes: Les Eyzies-de-Tayac and Sireuil. On 1 January 2019, it was merged into the new commune Les Eyzies.

Les Eyzies-de-Tayac-Sireuil lies in the Périgord Noir area. It is served by the Gare des Eyzies railway station. This locale is home to the Musée national de Préhistoire (National Museum of Prehistory) and the area contains several important archaeological sites, including the Font-de-Gaume, Grotte du Grand-Roc and Lascaux cave prehistoric rock dwellings. The many prehistoric sites and cave paintings in the area were inscribed on the UNESCO World Heritage List as Prehistoric Sites and Decorated Caves of the Vézère Valley in 1979.

== Geography ==
=== Location ===
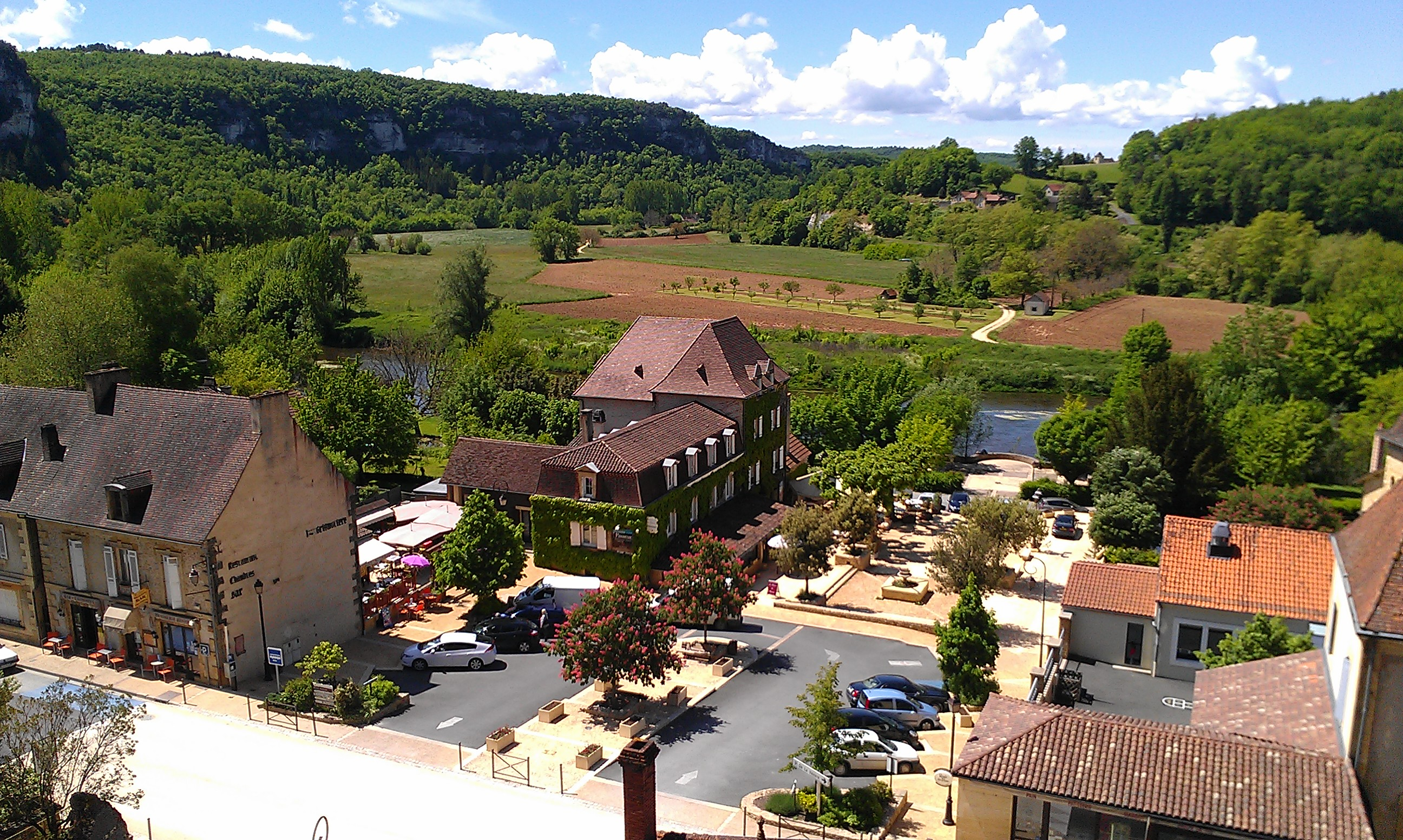
The town centre

The commune is located at the confluence of the Vézère and the Beune rivers. It is accessible by the SNCF network at the Gare des Eyzies, by the A89 motorway, exit 16 Périgueux-East (Bordeaux – Périgueux axis) and then by the D710 road or by Montignac via Terrasson (Lyon - Terrasson-Lavilledieu axis). In the north-west, the commune is also watered by another small tributary of the Vézère, the Manaurie.

=== Climate ===
In the Dordogne department, the highest temperature was recorded on 4 and 5 August 2003 at Les Eyzies-de-Tayac-Sireuil, with 43 °C.

== Toponymy ==
In Occitan, the commune bears the name Las Aisiás de Taiac e Siruèlh.

== History ==
In March 1868, the geologist Louis Lartet, financed by Henry Christy, discovered the first five skeletons of Cro-Magnons, the earliest known examples of Homo sapiens sapiens, in the Cro-Magnon rock shelter at Les Eyzies-de-Tayac. These skeletons included a foetus, and the skulls found were remarkably modern-looking and much rounder than the earlier Neanderthal.

== Economy ==
As at 31 December 2013, the municipality has 209 establishments, including 151 in the field of commerce, transport or services, twenty relating to the administrative sector, education, health or social action, eighteen in construction, thirteen in the industry, and seven in agriculture, forestry or fishing.

== Places and monuments ==
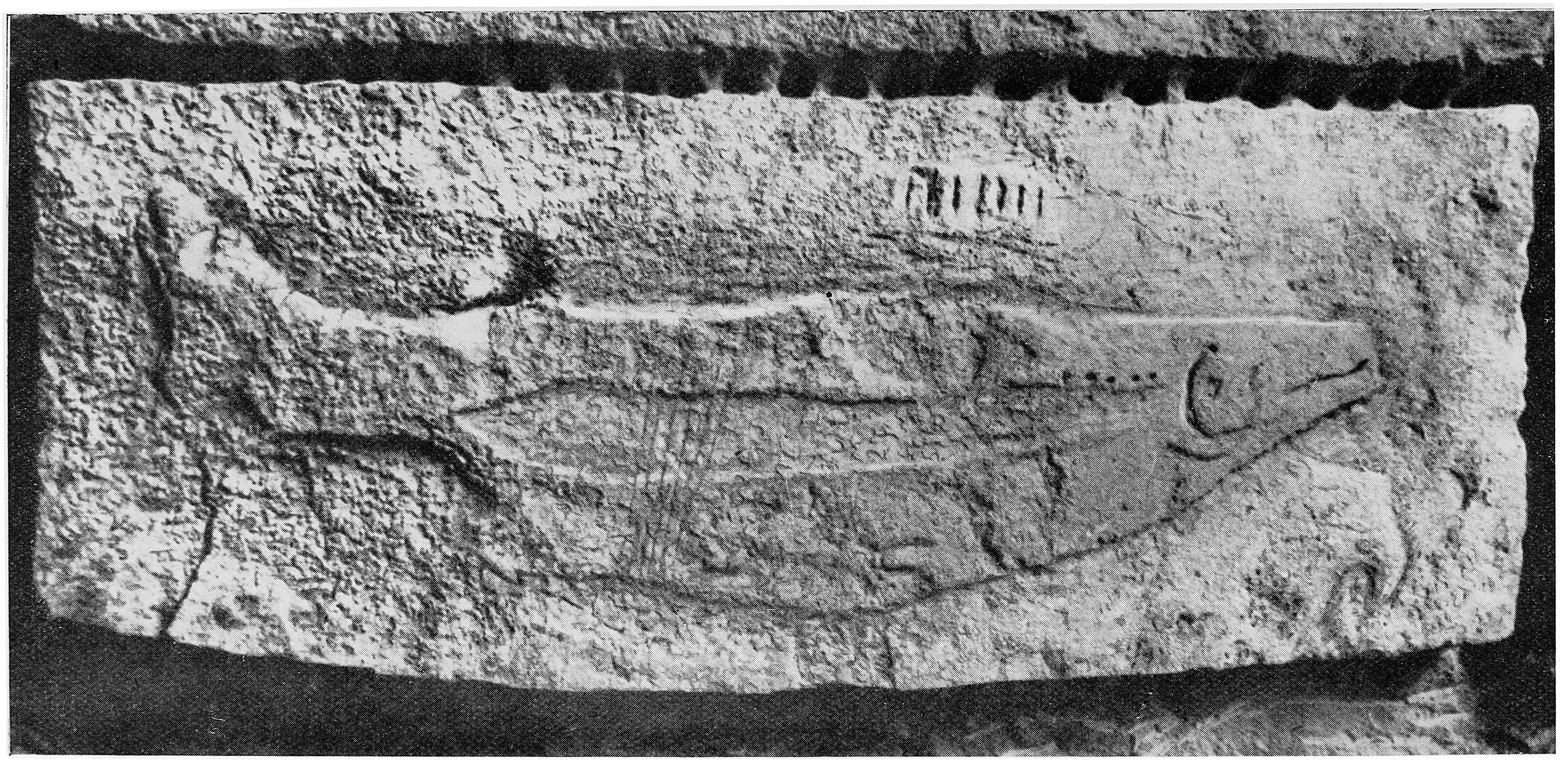
The low relief sculpture of a salmon, an example of prehistoric cave art discovered in the Abri du Poisson near Eyzies.

- L'Homme primitif is a statue by Paul Dardé, inaugurated in 1931 and placed on a natural platform that dominates the village of Les Eyzies; It can be approached during the visit of the National Museum of Prehistory.

=== Natural Sites ===
- Grotte du Grand Roc, cave with natural eccentric crystallisations comparable to corals.

=== Prehistoric sites ===
The municipality has many prehistoric archaeological sites including:

- The Grotte de Font-de-Gaume, the last cave with prehistoric polychrome paintings still open to visit in the region
- Les Combarelles - 600 pre-historic engravings of animals and symbols
- Grotte de la Mouthe - ornate cave of the Upper Paleolithic period
- La Grotte de Bernifal
- The deposit of La Micoque - discovery of numerous testimonies of the lithic industries of the Paleolithic (Tayacian, Micoquien and Mousterian)
- Abri Chadourne, named after its owner
- L'abri Audi
- L'abri de Cro-Magnon, the eponymous site of the Cro-Magnon man.
- L'abri Pataud, a site studied under the responsibility of the National Museum of Natural History. The stratigraphic sequences comprises Upper Paleolithic levels, in particular, from bottom to top, Aurignacian, Gravettian, and Protomagdalénien
- Laugerie-Basse and Laugerie-Haute - paleolithic sites
- L'abri du Poisson - carved in low relief at the ceiling of the vault, raised in red colour a salmon
- Le vallon de Gorge d'enfer - ( private site ) - home to the grand abri and the vallée éternelle scientific research foundation.
- Les grottes du Roc de Cazelle constitute a troglodytic site occupied from prehistoric times until 1960.

Many of these sites have been classified as World Heritage Sites by UNESCO as Prehistoric Sites and Decorated Caves of the Vézère Valley. The discovery of these shelters within a restricted radius around Les Eyzies, their methodical exploration and the study of the deposits they concealed allowed prehistory to build up as a science and explains why the city claims the status of world capital of the prehistory, as the publicity leaflets recall.

=== Museum ===
The National Museum of Prehistory, where many prehistoric discoveries are preserved, is located in the heart of the village. Very rich in carved flints, it is especially aimed at specialists.

=== Historical Sites ===
- Château de Commarque, 12th century, 14th century, 15th century, classified.
- Château de Tayac and its dependencies, 12th century 14th century 15th century.

== Personalities related to the municipality ==
Pioneers of Archaeology:

- Louis and Édouard Lartet
- Denis Peyrony
- Élie Peyrony
- Henri Breuil
- Louis Capitan
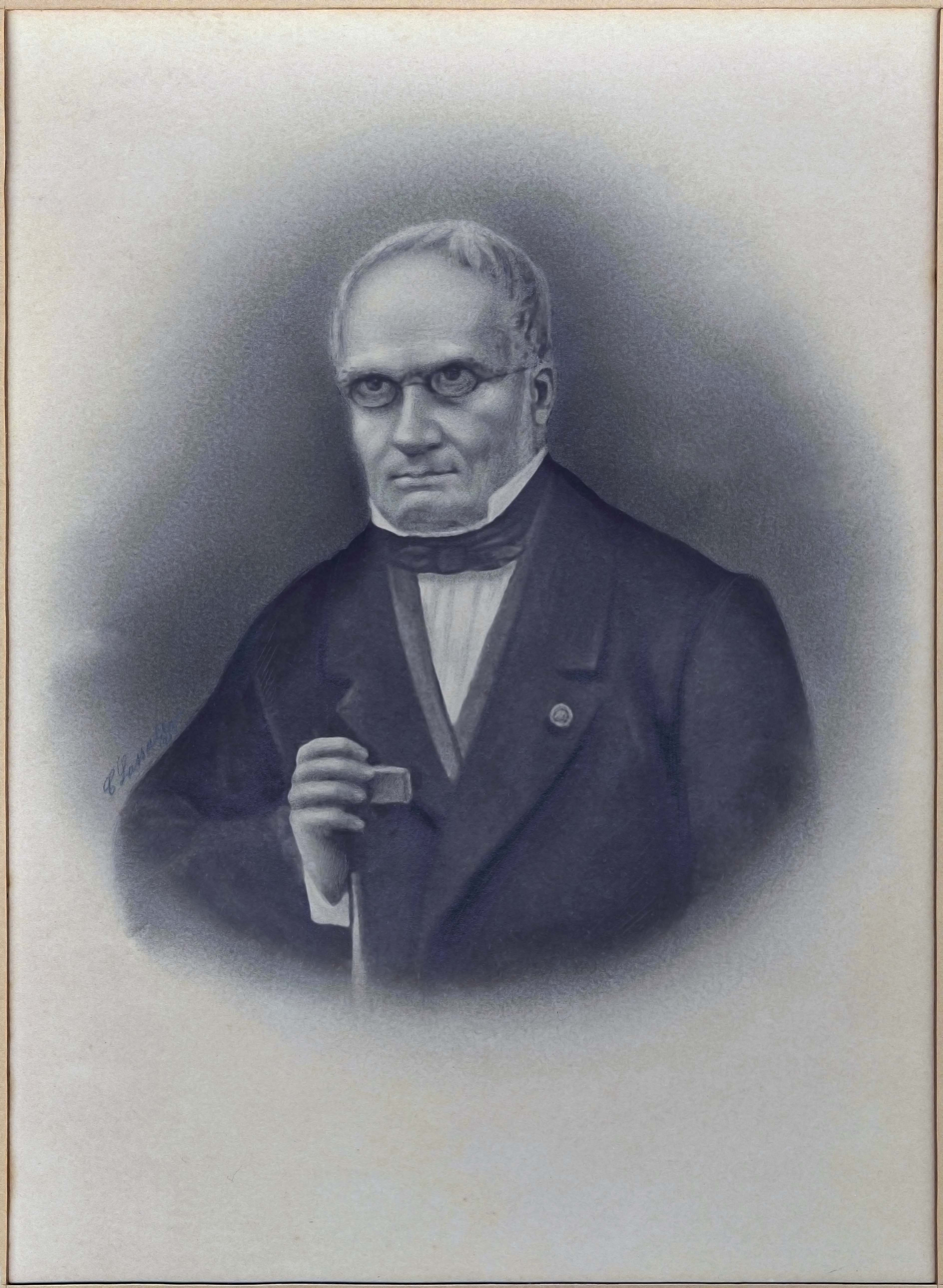
Édouard Lartet

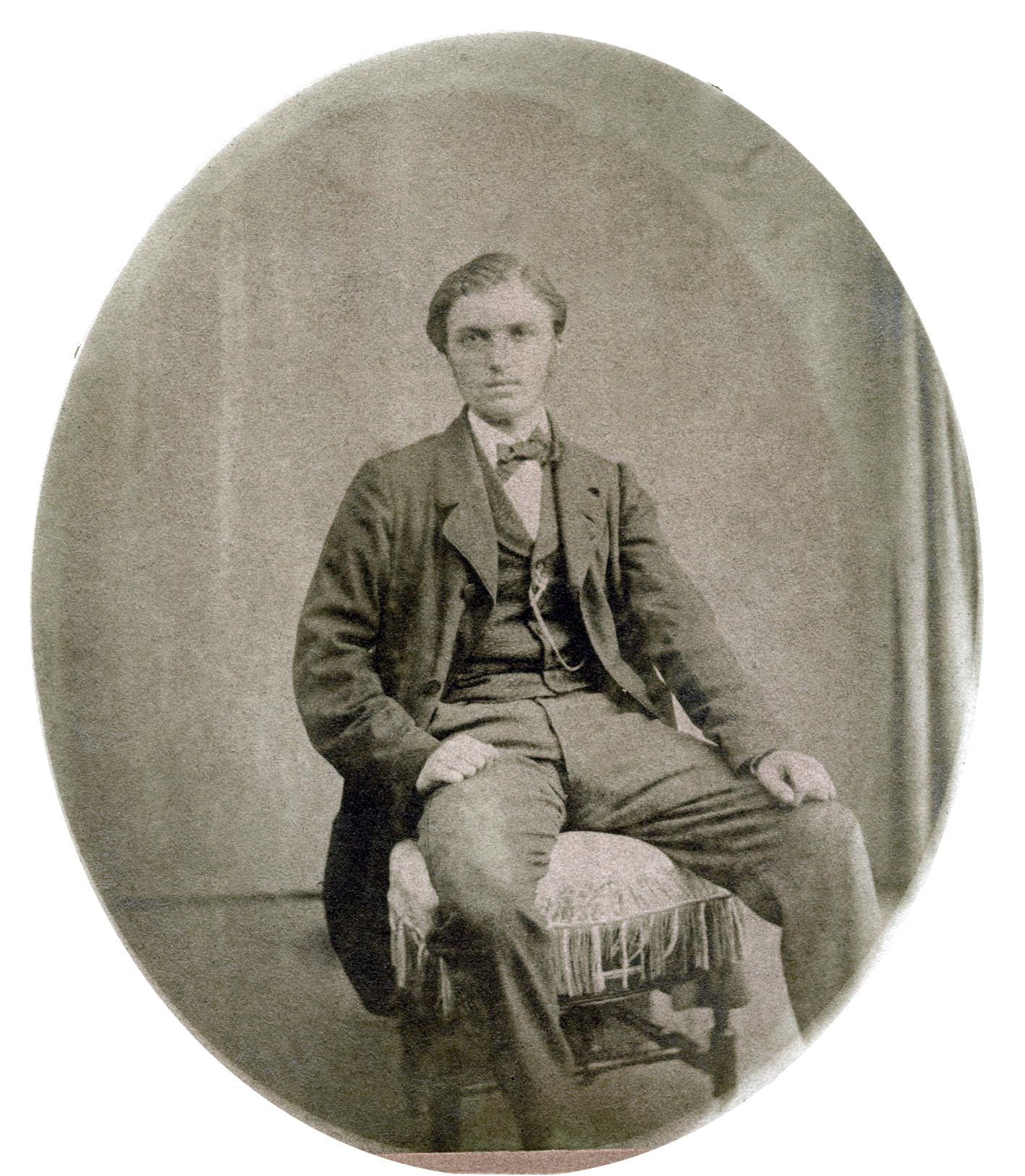
Louis Lartet

== Gallery ==
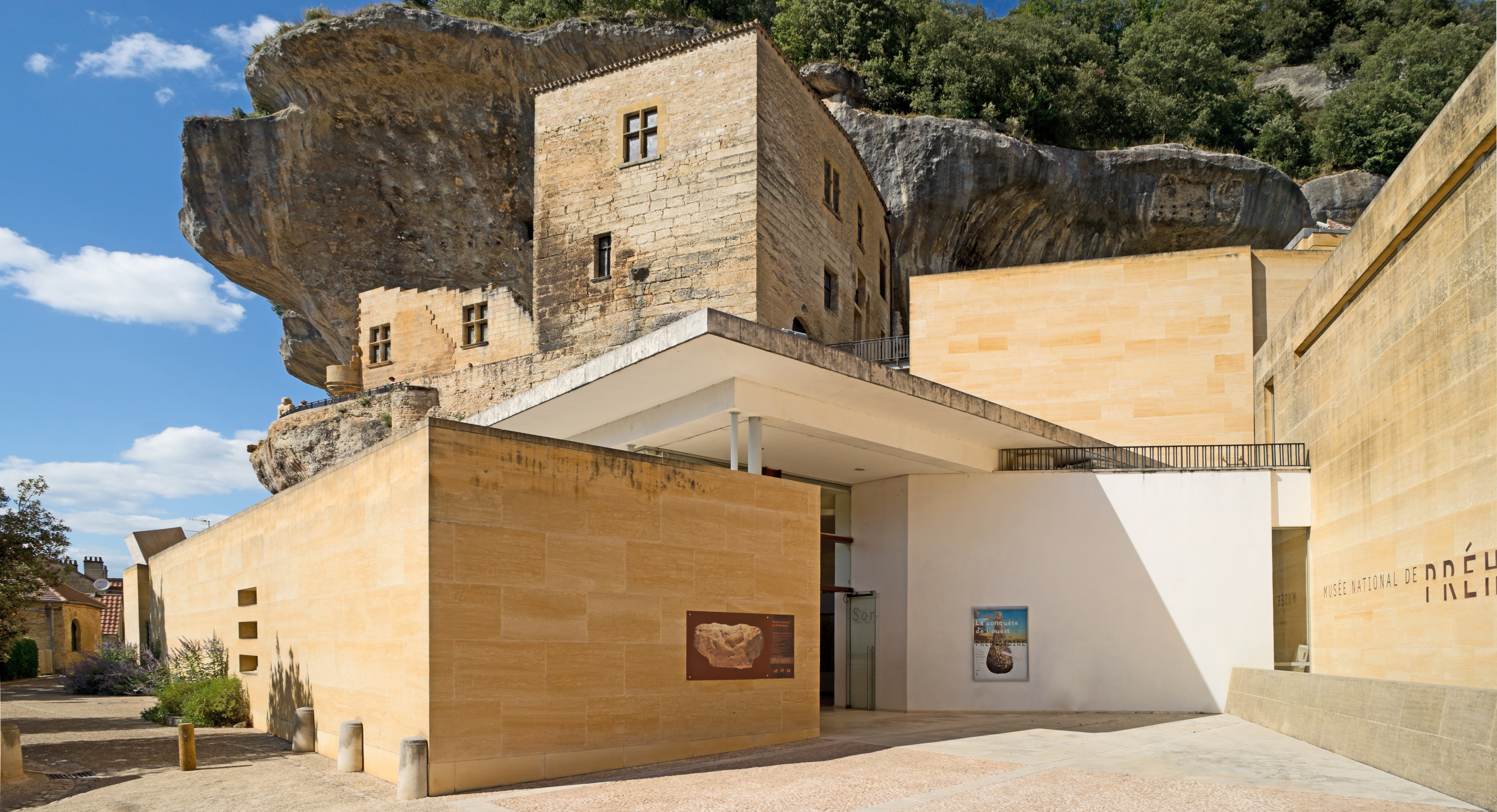
National Museum of Prehistory

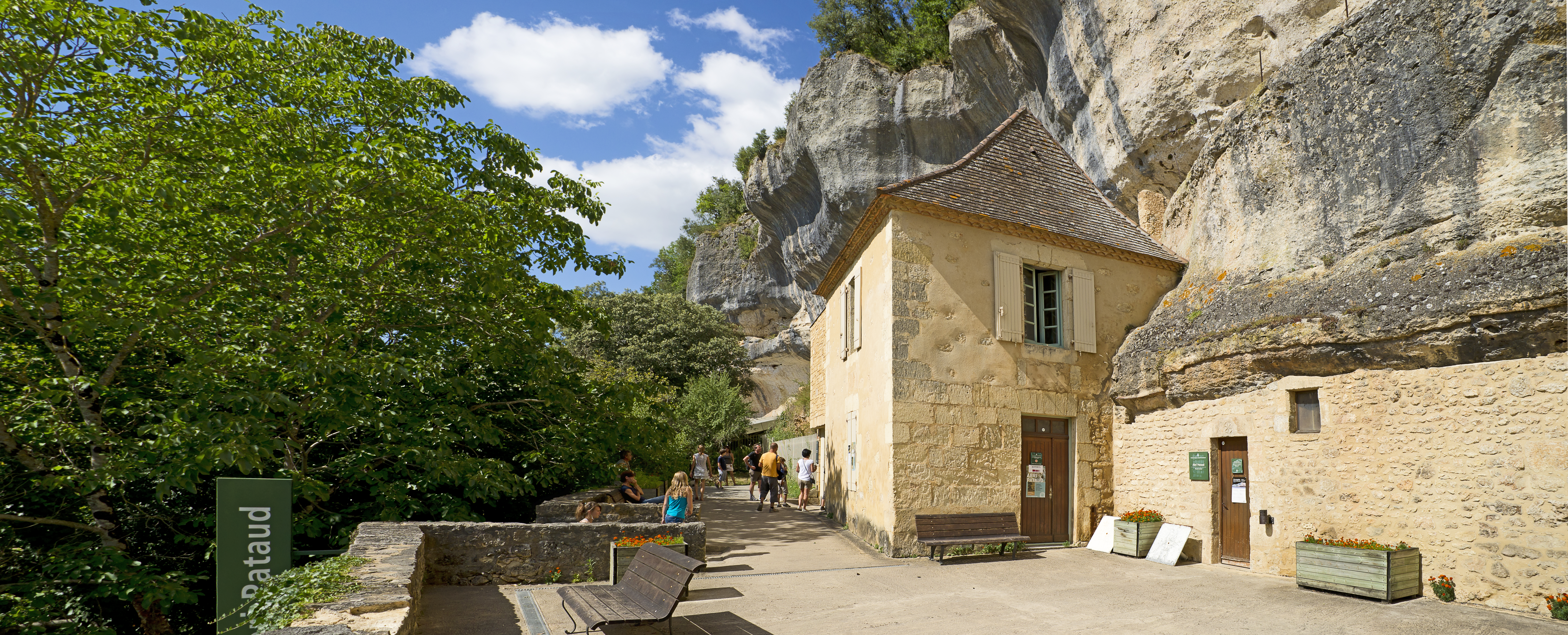
Abri Pataud

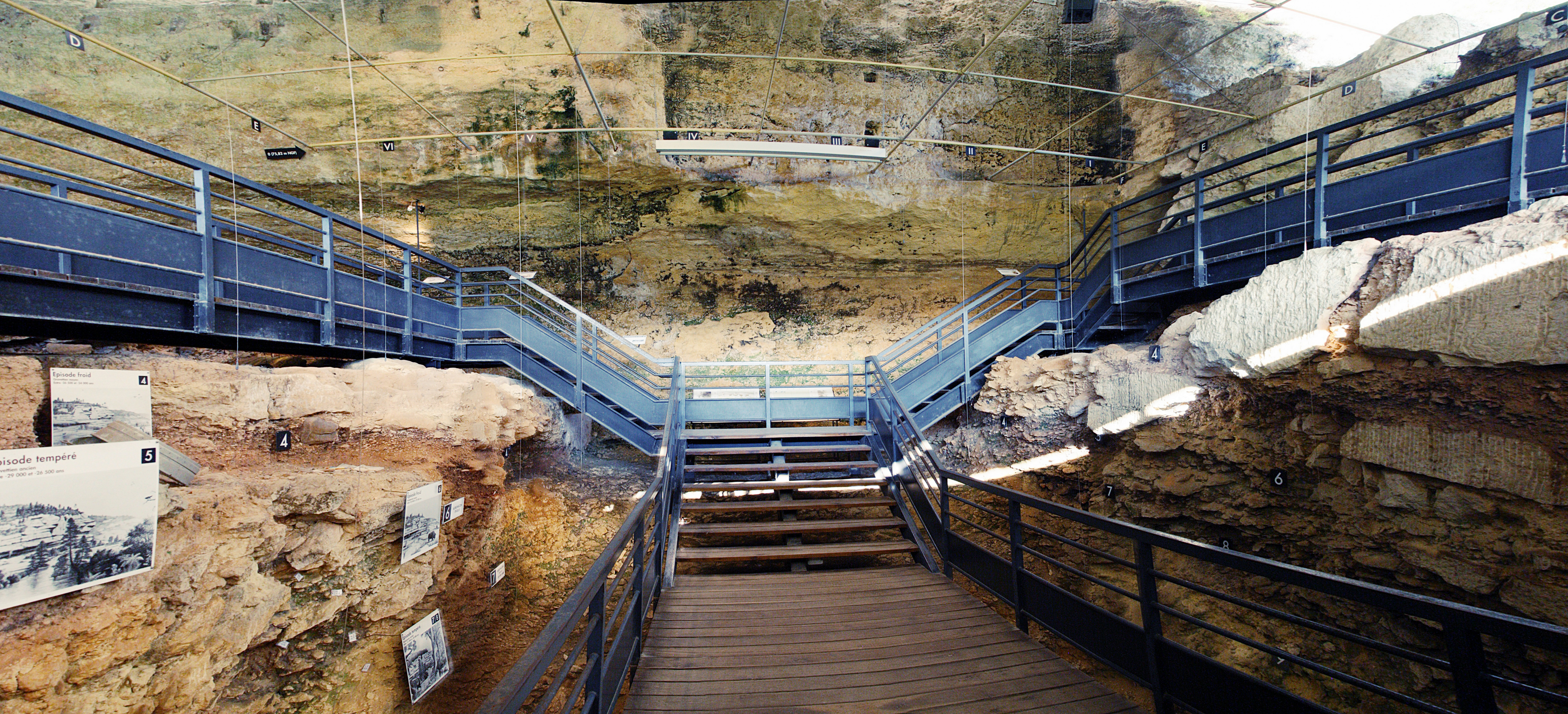
Abri Pataud

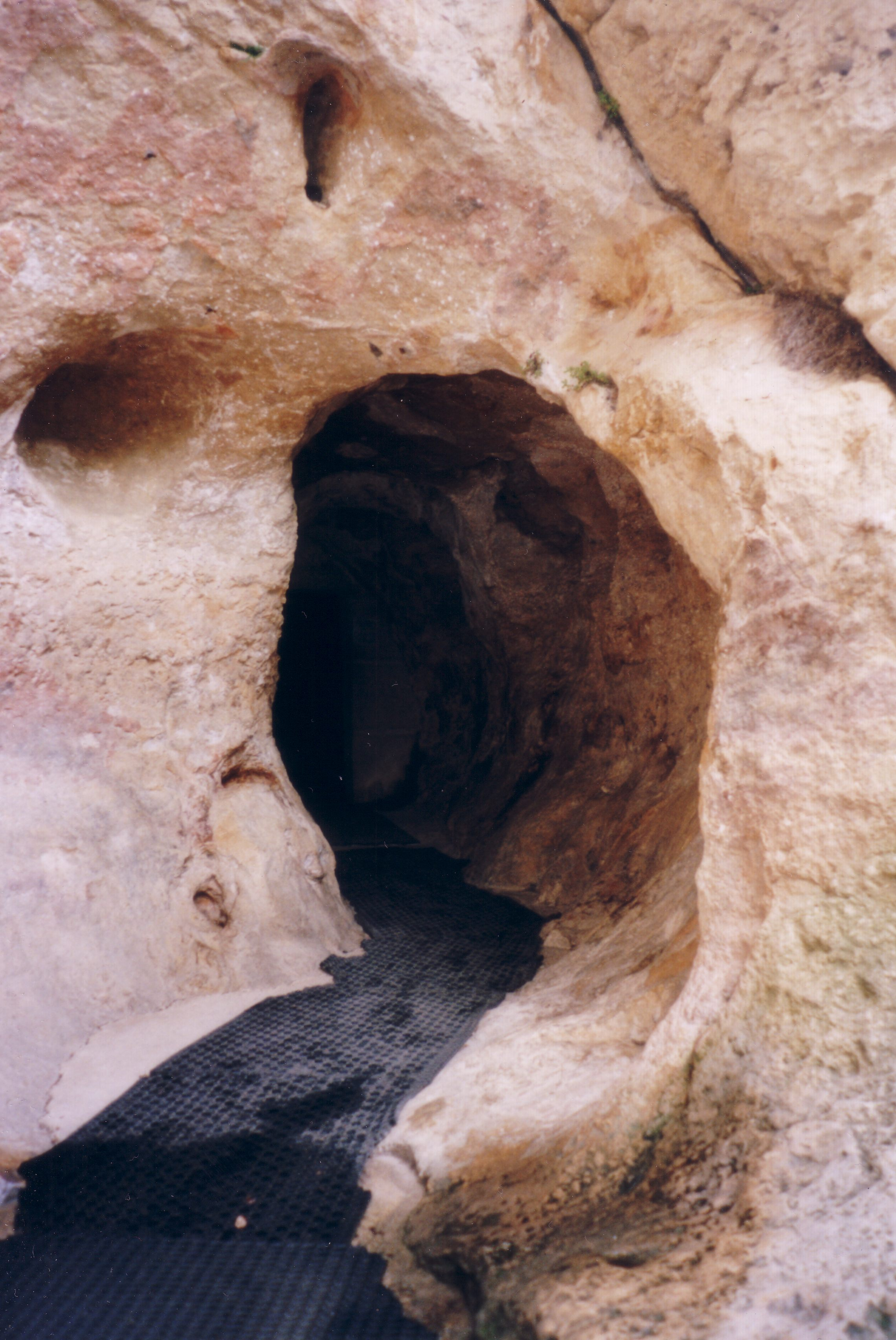
Grotte de Font-de-Gaume

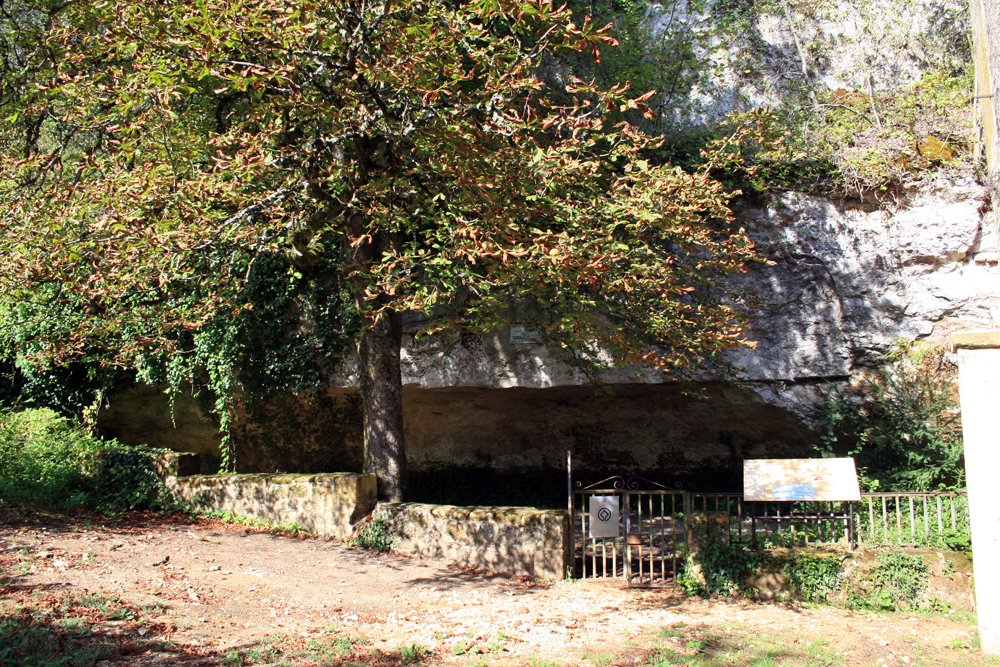
Cro-Magnon rock shelter

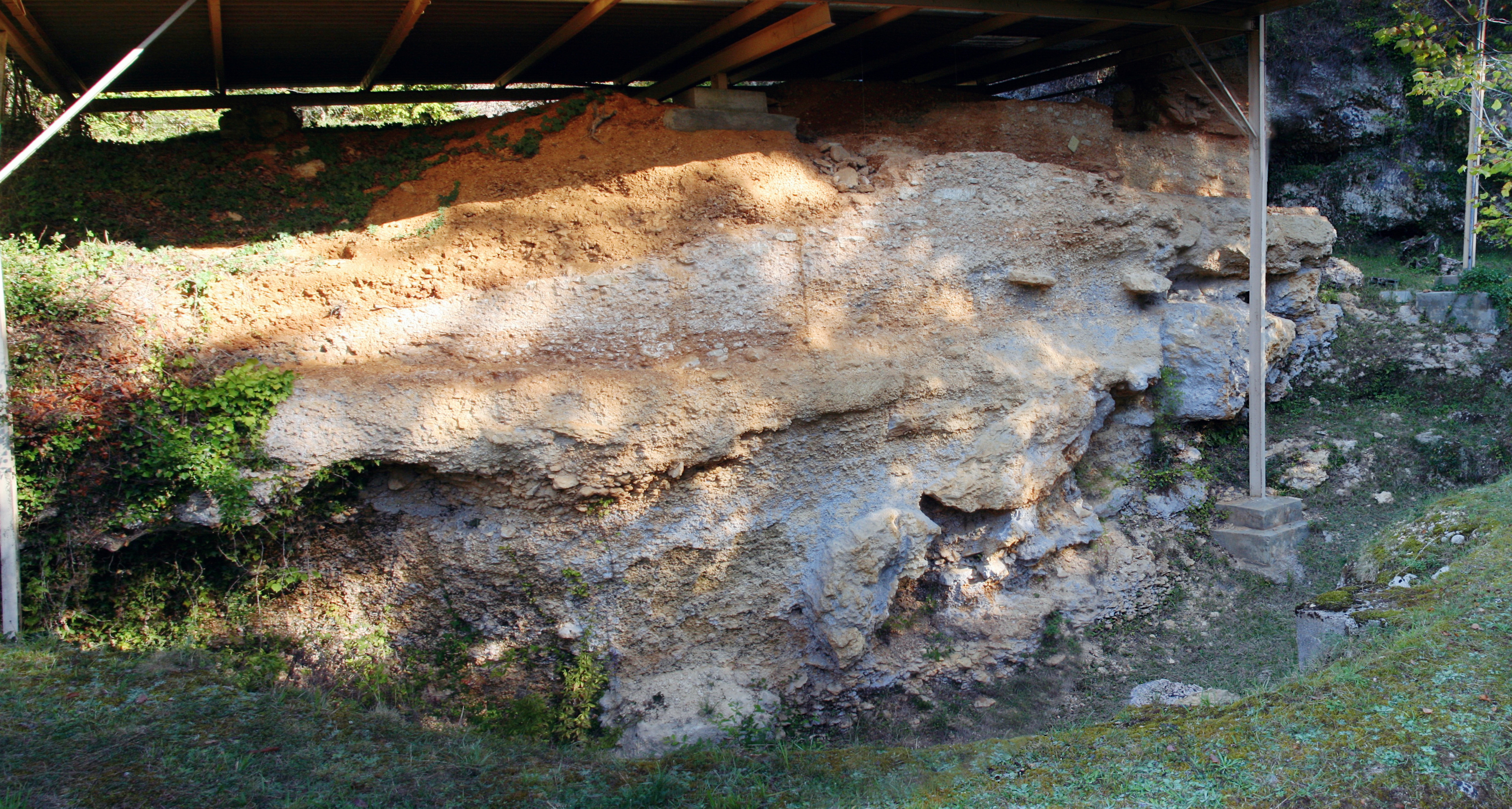
La Micoque

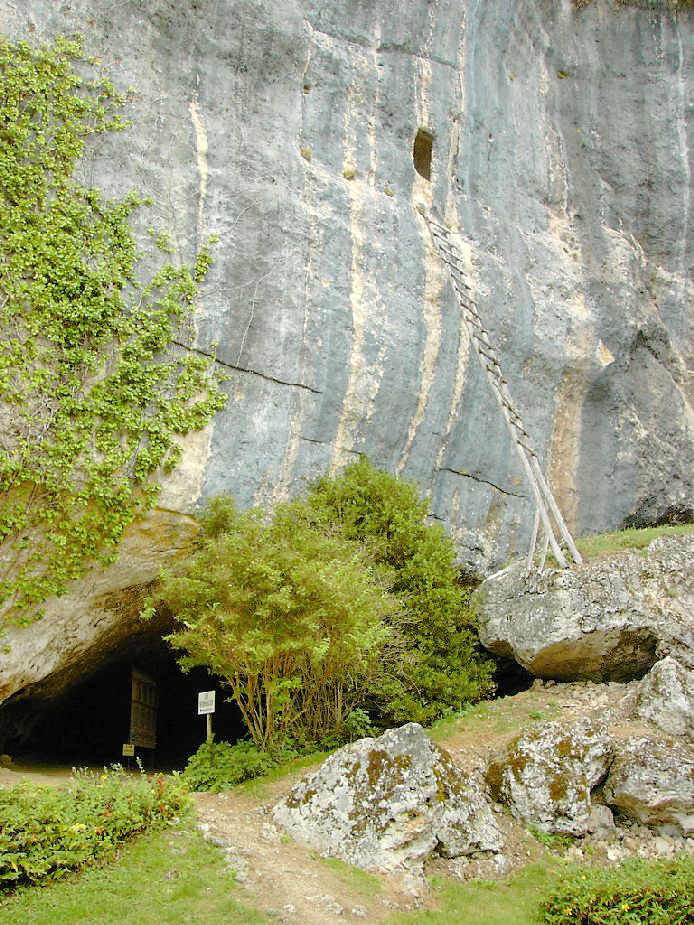
Laugerie-Basse

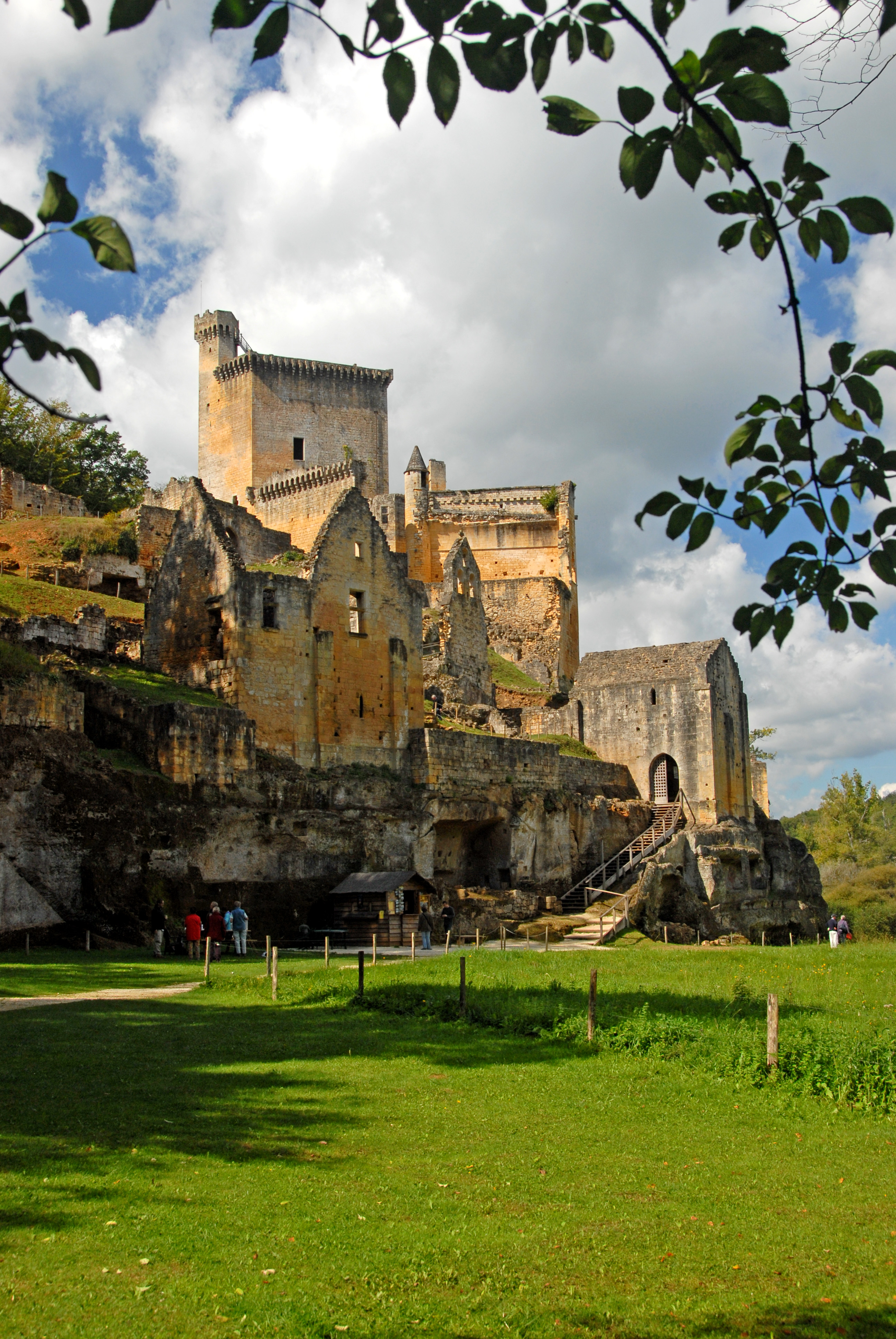
Château de Commarque

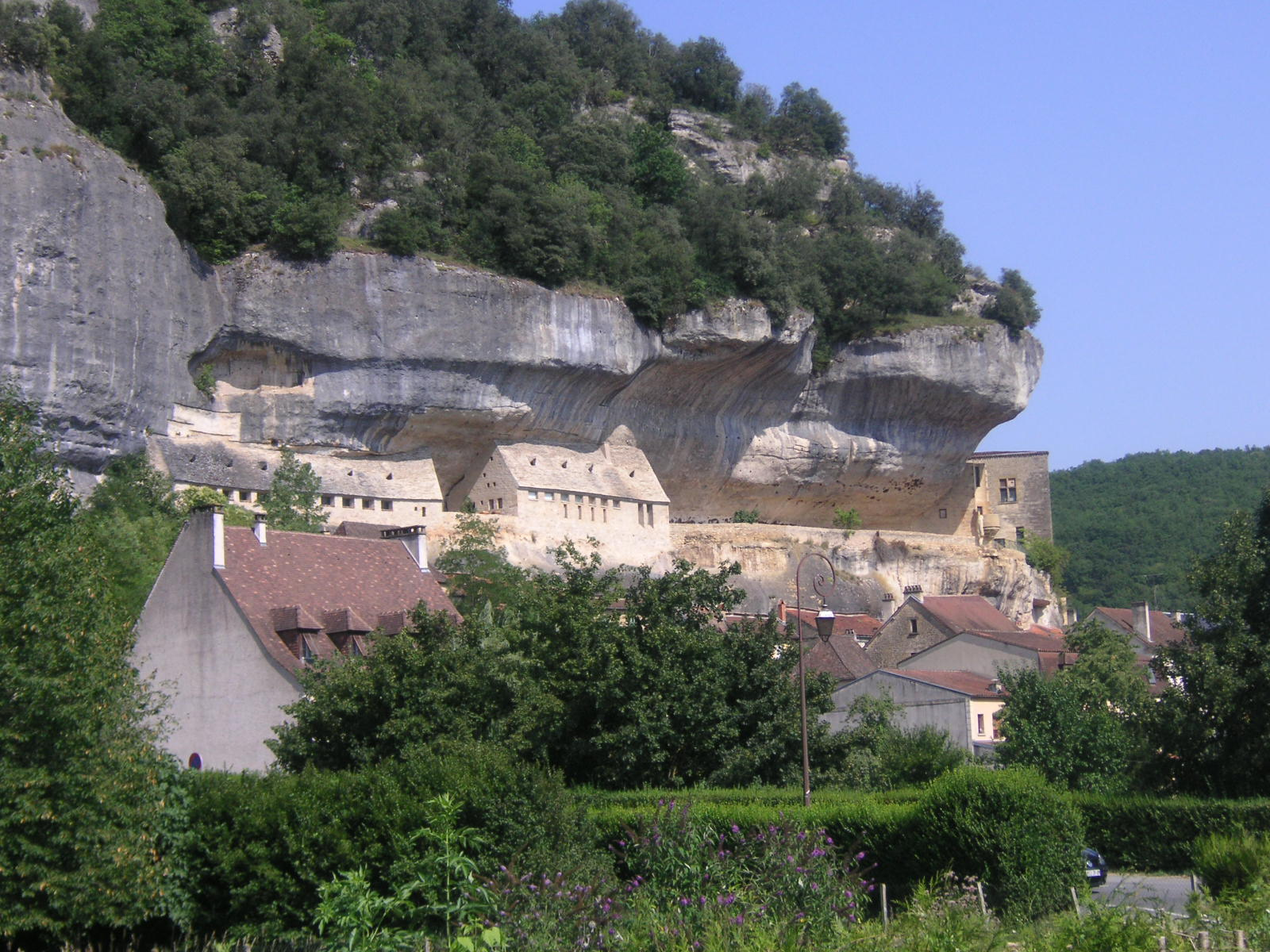
The cliffs overlooking
Les Eyzies

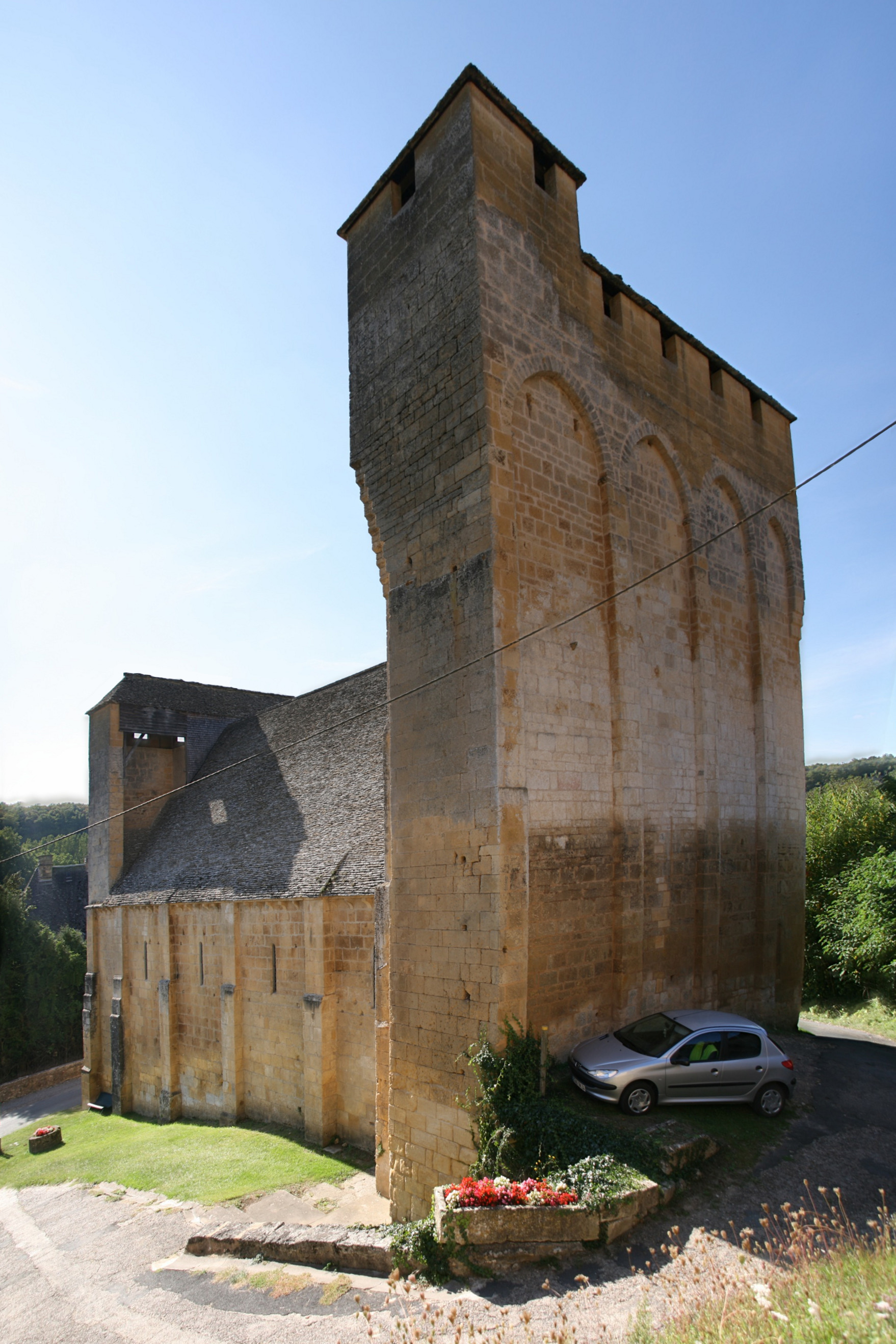
The fortified church at Tayac

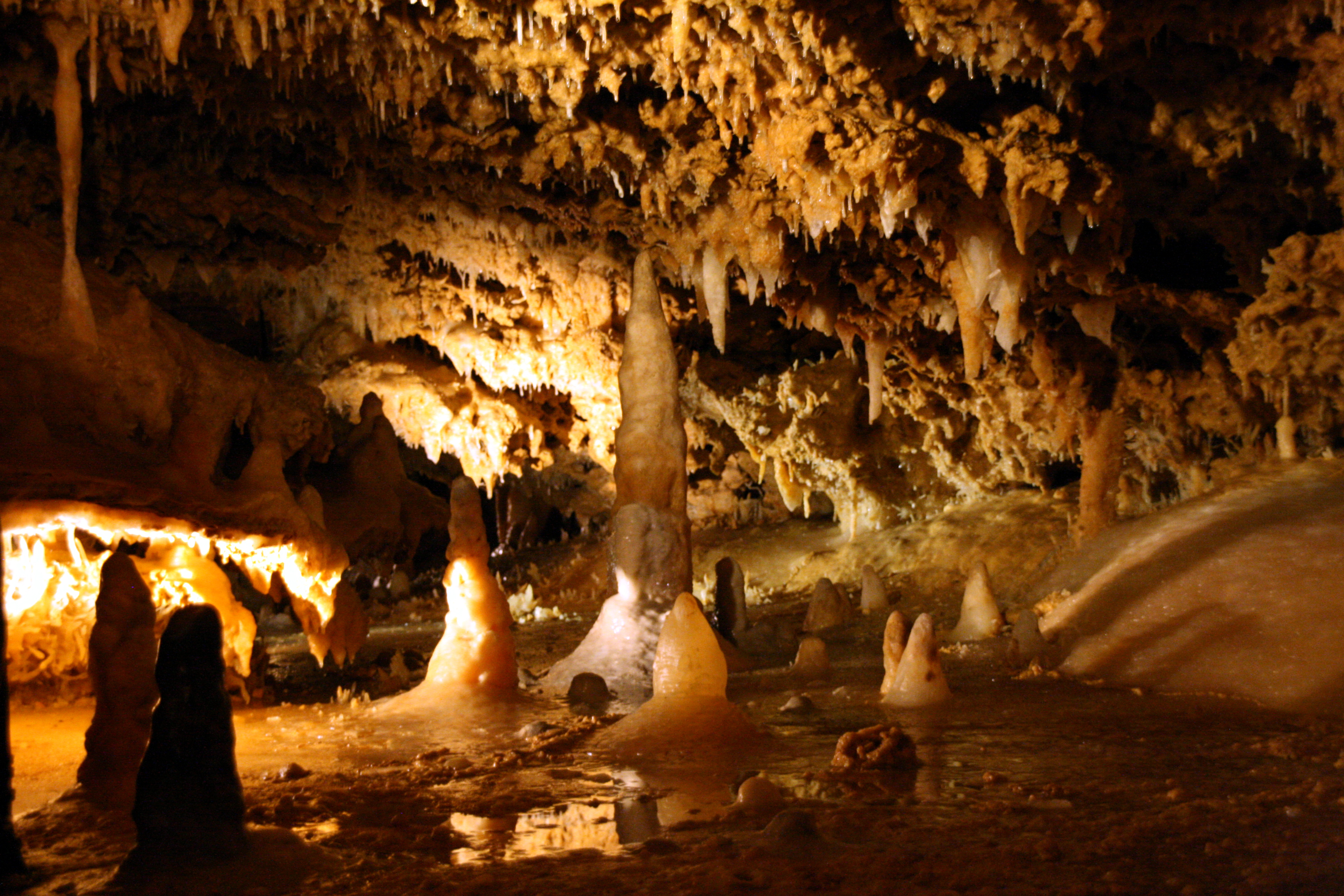
Grotte du Grand Roc

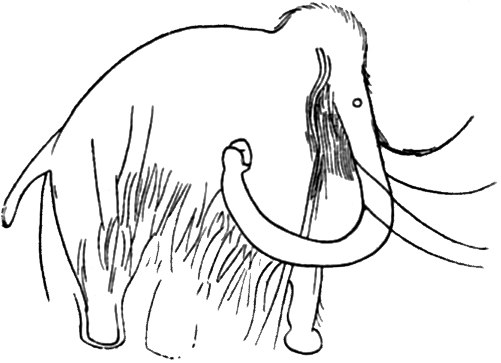
Copy of engraved mammoth from Les Combarelles

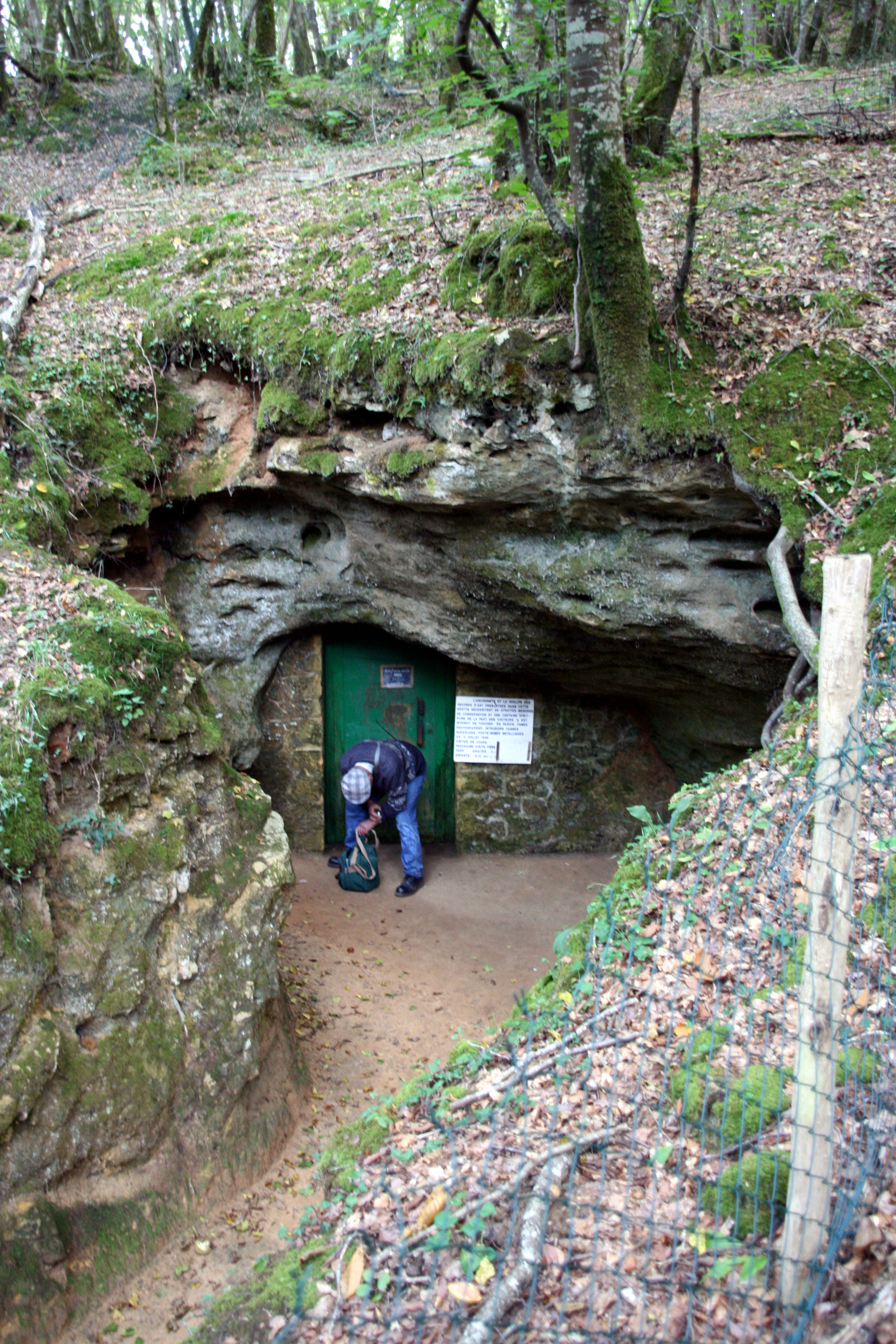
Entrance to the Grotte de Bernifal

== See also ==
- Abri Pataud
- Font-de-Gaume
- Château de Commarque
- Communes of the Dordogne department
- Les Combarelles
- Micoquien
