= Château de Tayac =

French fortified castle

Coordinates: 44°56′10″N 1°00′49″E

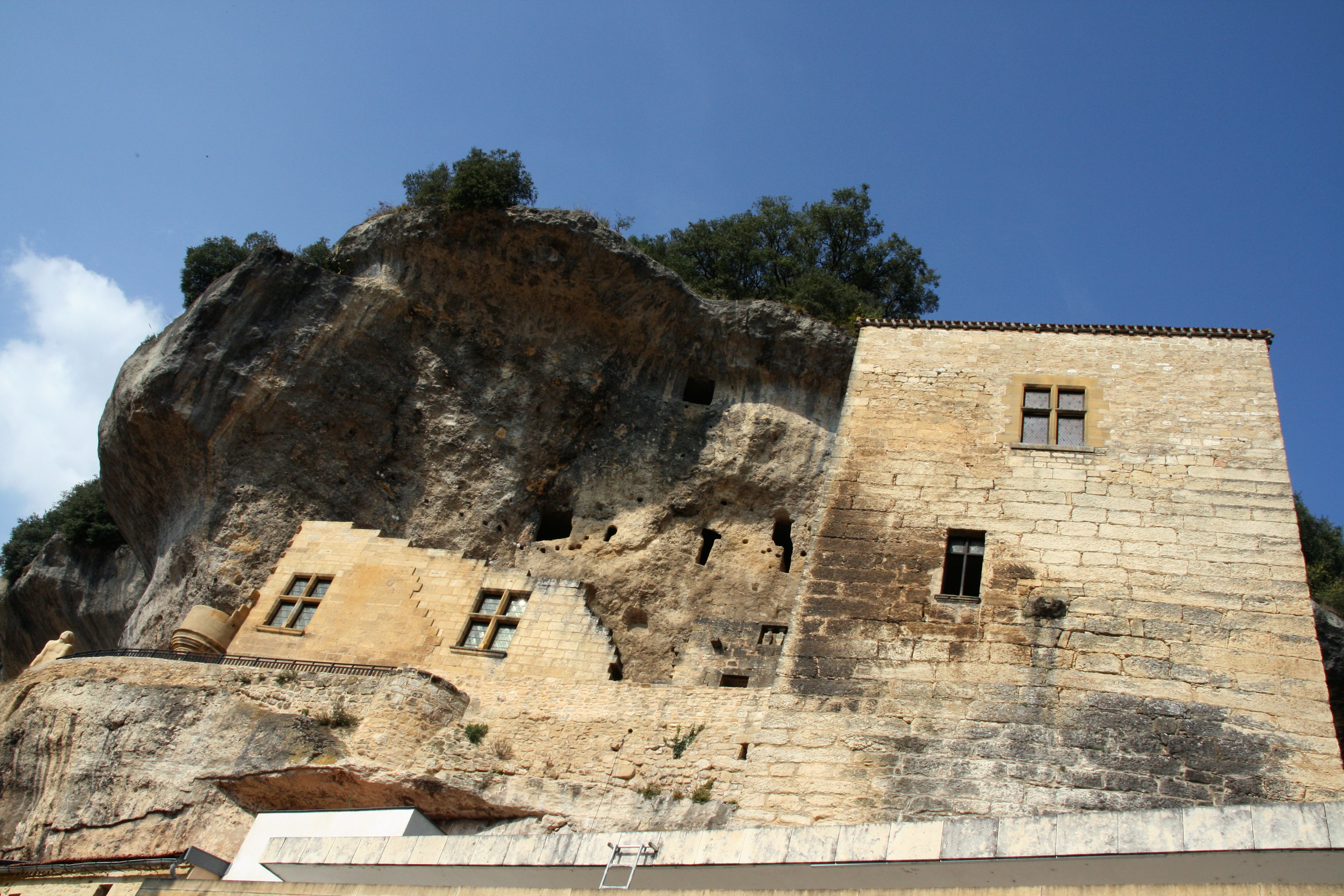

The Château de Tayac is a castle in the commune of Les Eyzies-de-Tayac-Sireuil in the Dordogne département of France.

== History ==
The castle stands on a platform in a cliff. This platform was occupied in prehistoric times; Magdelanian and Azilian artifacts have been found. Then known as the Roc de Tayac, the early castle was built in the 13th century. During the course of the Hundred Years' War, it was held alternately by the English and the French, suffering successive sieges. It had to be rebuilt in the 16th century. In 1595, it suffered a siege during the Jacquerie des Croquants, an uprising of peasants against the king (1590–1600). In 1606, the king ordered the castle's demolition, undoubtedly following the execution of Jean Guy de Beynac who had been implicated in the Duke of Bouillon's conspiracy.

== Description ==
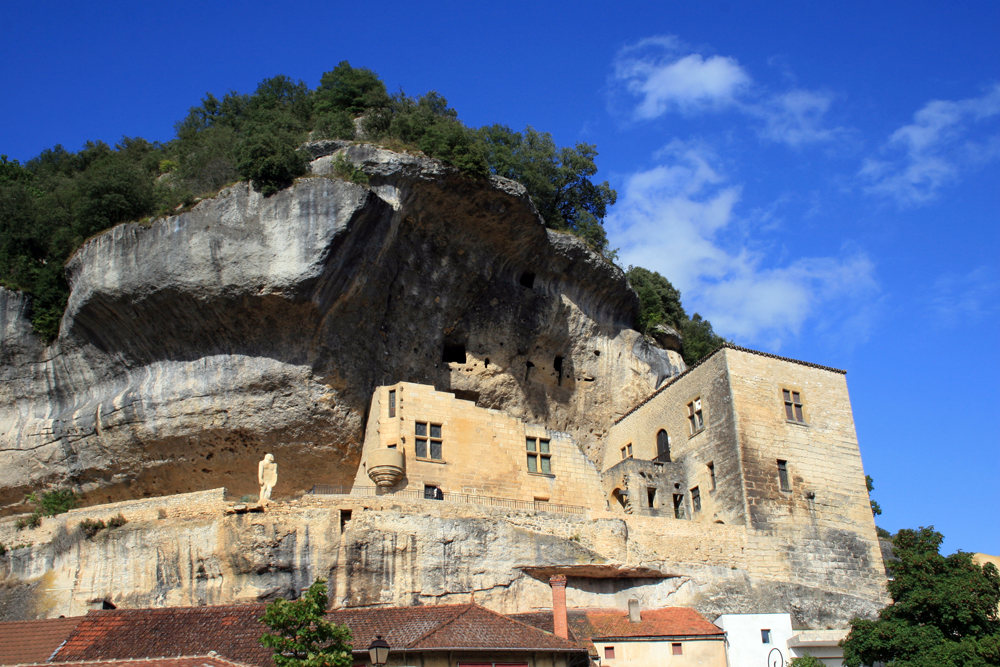
The Château de Tayac houses part of the collections of the Musée national de Préhistoire.

The edifice is partly cut out of the rock and partly built. Its defensive walls rise on a corbelling of the cliff. The rooms, corridors and stairways are cut from the rock. Access is through a doorway beneath a semicircular arch of large stones. This entrance leads to a passage, partly excavated, partly built, under the building at right angles to the main façade, which barred access to the platform. The corps de logis, parallel to the cliff, has a turret in its south west corner supported by corbels.

The castle site is state property. It has been listed since 1968 as a monument historique by the French Ministry of Culture.

== See also ==
- List of castles in France
