= Saint-Cirq, Dordogne =

Saint-Cirq
- Part of Les Eyzies
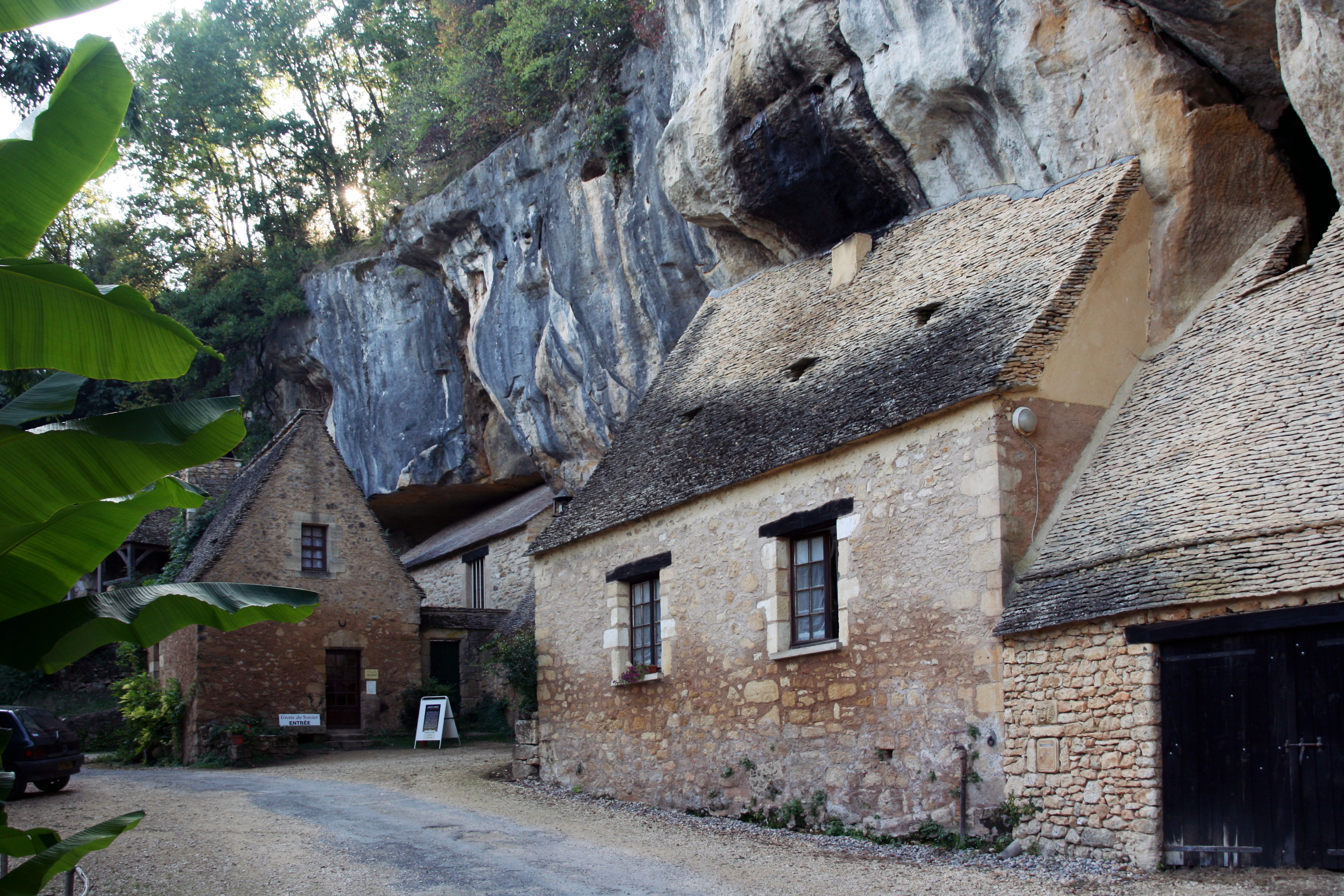
- Upper village
- Location of Saint-Cirq
- Location within France Location within Nouvelle-Aquitaine
- Coordinates: 44°55′37″N 0°58′12″E
- Country: France
- Region: Nouvelle-Aquitaine
- Department: Dordogne
- Arrondissement: Sarlat-la-Canéda
- Canton: Vallée de l'Homme
- Commune: Les Eyzies
- Area^{1}: 5.96 km^{2} (2.30 sq mi)
- Elevation: 70 m (230 ft)
- Highest elevation: 215 m (705 ft)
- Lowest elevation: 54 m (177 ft)
- Population (2023): 135
  - Density: 22.7/km^{2} (58.7/sq mi)
- Time zone: UTC+01:00 (CET)
  - Summer (DST): UTC+02:00 (CEST)
- Postal code: 24260
- ^{1} French Land Register data, which excludes lakes, ponds, glaciers > 1 km^{2} (0.386 sq mi or 247 acres) and river estuaries.

Saint-Cirq (French pronunciation: [sɛ̃ siʁk]; Occitan: Sent Circ) is a former commune in the Dordogne department in Nouvelle-Aquitaine in southwestern France. On 1 January 2019, it was merged into the new commune Les Eyzies.

== See also ==
- Communes of the Dordogne department
