= Les Eyzies =

- Commune
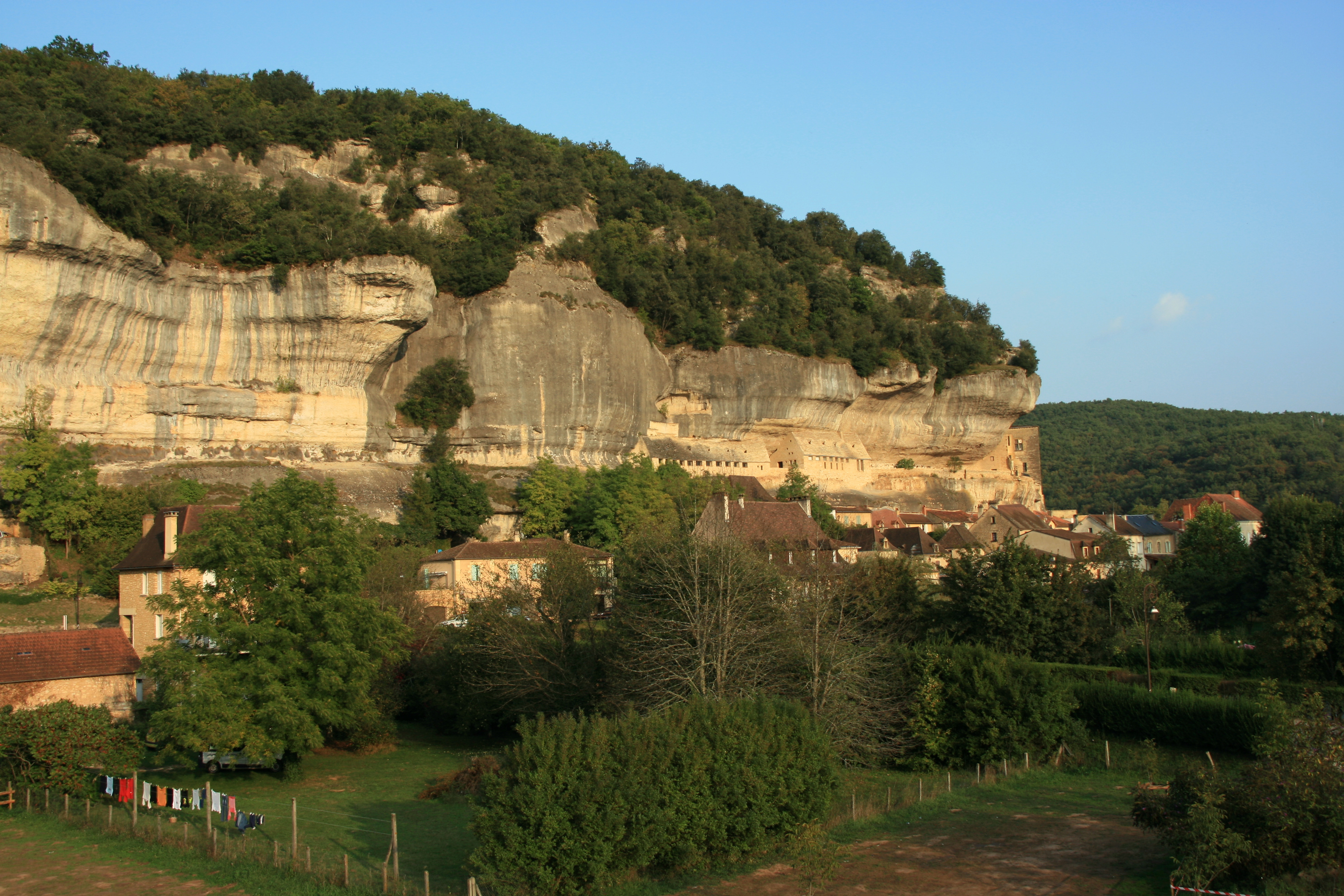
- A general view of Les Eyzies-de-Tayac
- Location of Les Eyzies
- Location within France Location within Nouvelle-Aquitaine
- Coordinates: 44°56′10″N 1°01′05″E
- Country: France
- Region: Nouvelle-Aquitaine
- Department: Dordogne
- Arrondissement: Sarlat-la-Canéda
- Canton: Vallée de l'Homme
- Intercommunality: Vallée de l'Homme

Government
  - Mayor (2020–2026): Philippe Lagarde
- Area^{1}: 53.37 km^{2} (20.61 sq mi)
- Highest elevation: 245 m (804 ft)
- Lowest elevation: 54 m (177 ft)
- Population (2023): 1,134
  - Density: 21.25/km^{2} (55.03/sq mi)
- Time zone: UTC+01:00 (CET)
  - Summer (DST): UTC+02:00 (CEST)
- INSEE/Postal code: 24172 /24620
- ^{1} French Land Register data, which excludes lakes, ponds, glaciers > 1 km^{2} (0.386 sq mi or 247 acres) and river estuaries.

Les Eyzies (French pronunciation: [le.z‿ezi]; Occitan: Las Aisiás) is a commune in the Dordogne department in Nouvelle-Aquitaine in southwestern France. It was established on 1 January 2019 by merger of the former communes of Les Eyzies-de-Tayac-Sireuil (the seat), Manaurie and Saint-Cirq. Les Eyzies station has rail connections to Périgueux and Agen.
