= Cave painting =

Paintings, often prehistoric, on cave walls and ceilings

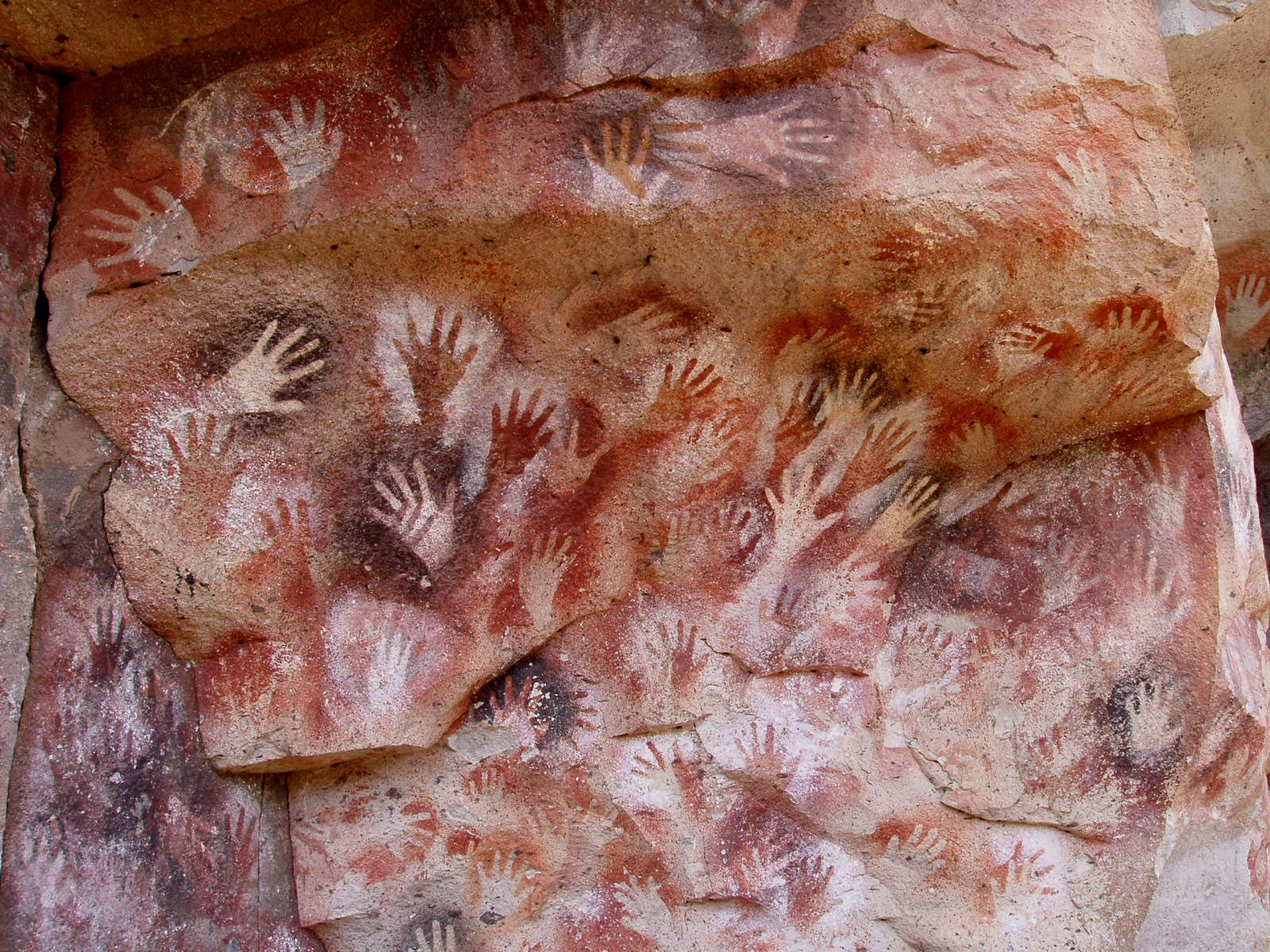
Cueva de las Manos, Perito Moreno, Argentina. The art in the cave is dated between 7,300 BC and 700 AD; (Note: The UNESCO dates the art to 13,000–9,000 BP.) stenciled, mostly left hands are shown.

In archaeology, cave paintings are a type of parietal art (which category also includes petroglyphs, or engravings), found on the wall or ceilings of caves. The term usually implies prehistoric origin. Some of these paintings may not have been created by Homo sapiens, but by other human species. By 2026, the earliest known examples of rock painting dates back 73,000 years.

Discussion around prehistoric art is important in understanding the history of Homo sapiens and how human beings express that they have abstract thoughts. Some point to these prehistoric paintings as possible examples of creativity, spirituality, and sentimental thinking in prehistoric humans.

== Dating ==
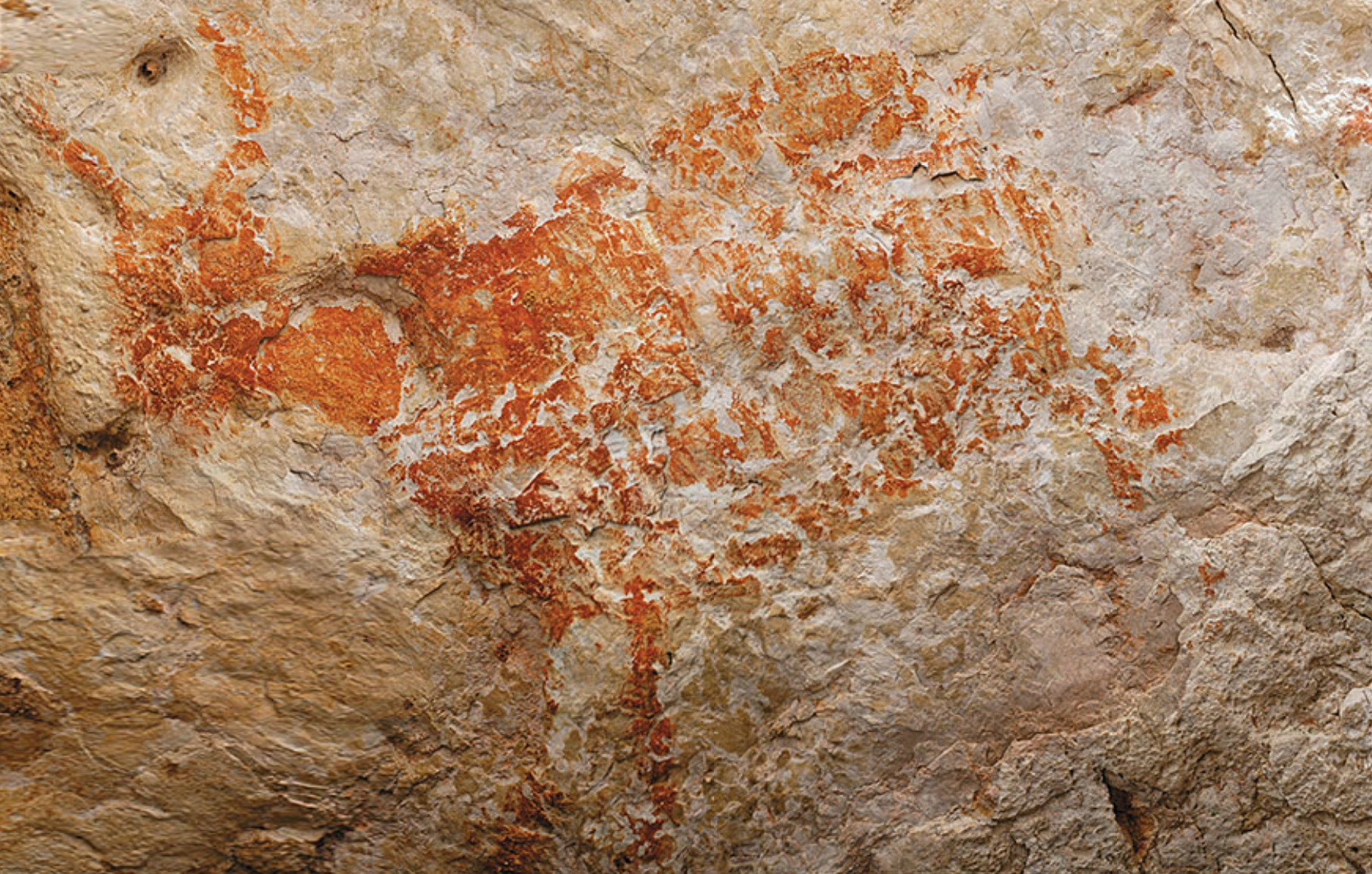
One of the oldest known figurative paintings, a depiction of an unknown bovine, was discovered in the Lubang Jeriji Saléh cave and dated to be more than 40,000 (perhaps as old as 52,000) years old.

Nearly 350 caves have been discovered in France and Spain that contain art from prehistoric times. Initially, the age of the paintings had been a contentious issue, since methods such as radiocarbon dating may produce misleading results if contaminated by other samples, and caves and rocky overhangs (where parietal art is found) typically are littered with debris from many time periods. But subsequent technology has made it possible to date the paintings by sampling the pigment itself, torch marks on the walls, or the formation of carbonate deposits on top of the artwork. The subject matter also may indicate chronology: for instance, the reindeer depicted in the Spanish cave of Cueva de las Monedas places the drawings in the last Ice Age.

The oldest claimed cave painting is from Liang Metanduno on Muna Island, a stencil or handprint dated at least 67,800 years old. This artwork predates by at least 1,100 years a cave painting previously thought to be the oldest, found in the Maltravieso cave, which has been suggested to have been made by a Neanderthal based on its age. The oldest date given to a figurative cave painting is a depiction of several human figures hunting pigs in the caves in the Maros-Pangkep karst of South Sulawesi, Indonesia, in 2019 dated to be more than 43,900 years old. Before that finding, the oldest known figurative cave painting were those of a bull dated to 40,000 years at Lubang Jeriji Saléh cave, East Kalimantan, Indonesian Borneo, and a depiction of a pig with a minimum age of 35,400 years at Timpuseng cave in Sulawesi.

All these age estimates that are based on uranium-lead dating, have been contested, because they do not account for the potential for leaching of uranium, which if not accounted for would artificially skew the date for the cave paintings too old.

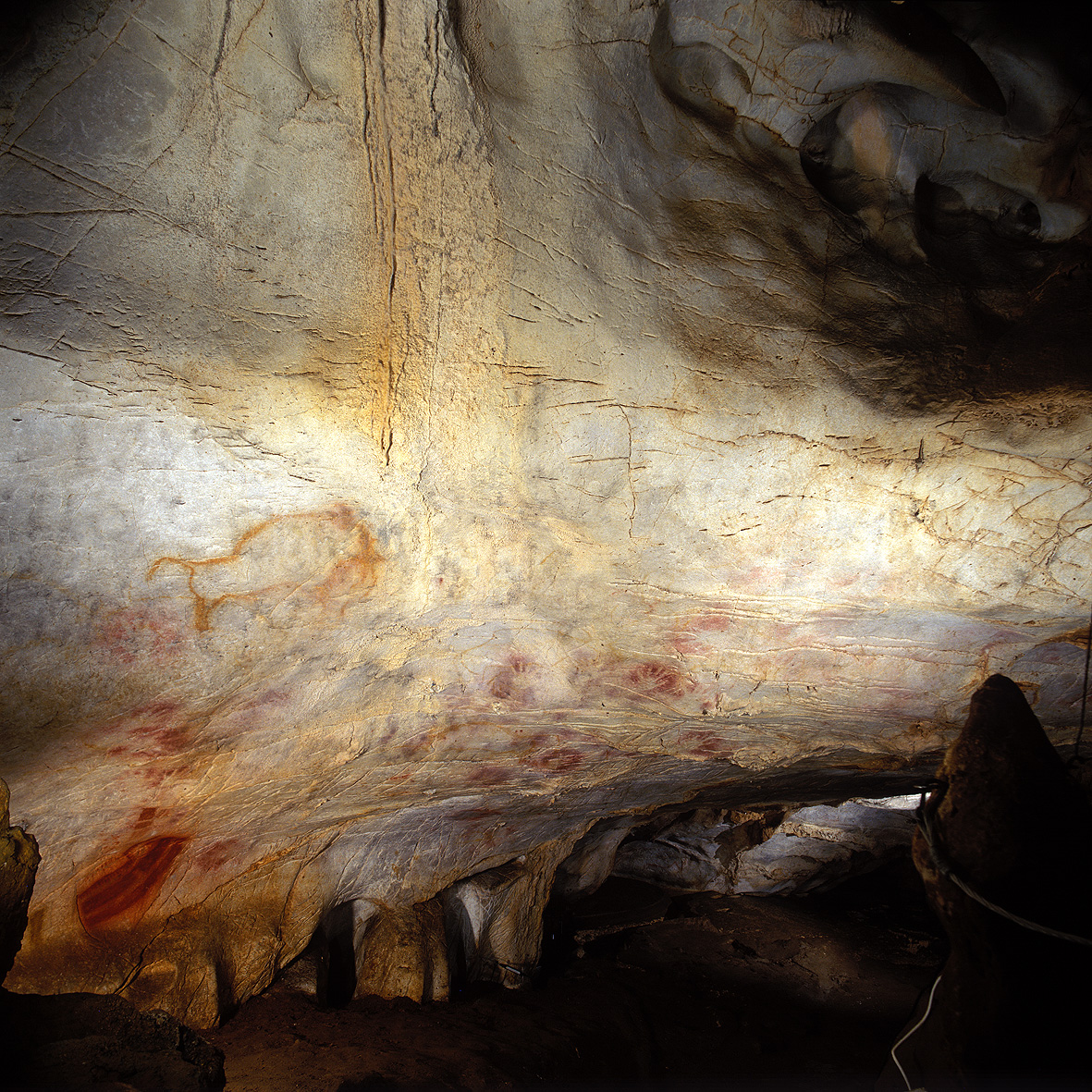
Inside of the Cave of El Castillo in Puente Viesgo, Cantabria (Spain). Dating back to 40,000 BC, El Castillo hosts the earliest figurative cave painting in Europe known to date.

The oldest known rock painting (by 2026) is not found in a cave, however, but was found in a South African excavation site. The hand-drawn lines on the small piece of rock are dating back 73,000 years.

The earliest known European figurative cave paintings are those of the Cave of El Castillo in Spain, which a 2012 study using uranium-thorium dated back to at least 40,000 BC. Prior to this announcement, it was believed that the oldest figurative cave paintings were those of the Chauvet Cave in France, dating to earlier than 30,000 BC in the Upper Paleolithic according to radiocarbon dating. Some researchers believe the drawings are too advanced for this era and question this age. More than 80 radiocarbon dates had been obtained by 2011, with samples taken from torch marks and from the paintings themselves, as well as from animal bones and charcoal found on the cave floor. The radiocarbon dates from these samples show that there were two periods of creation in Chauvet: 35,000 years ago and 30,000 years ago. One of the surprises was that many of the paintings were modified repeatedly over thousands of years, possibly explaining the confusion about finer paintings that seemed to date earlier than cruder ones.

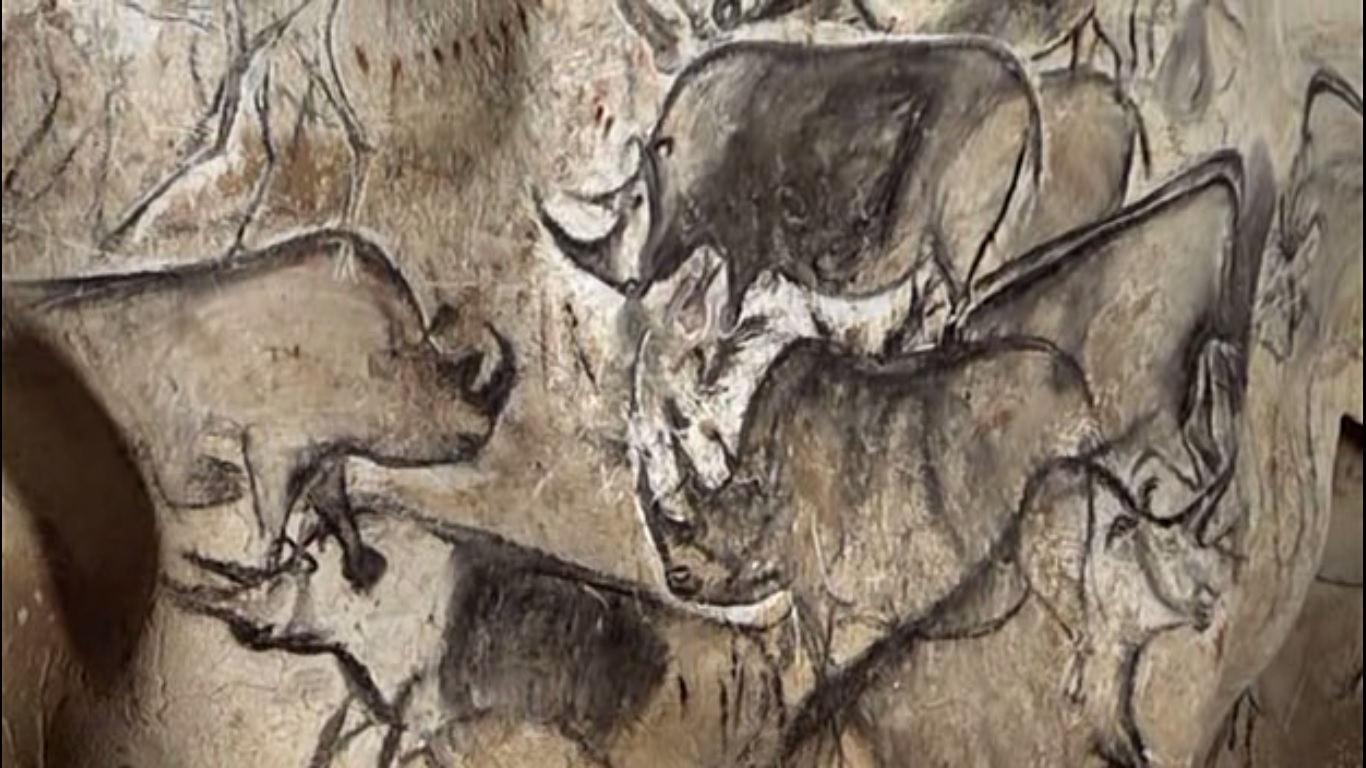
An artistic depiction of a group of rhinoceros was completed in the Chauvet Cave 30,000 to 32,000 years ago.

In 2009, cavers discovered drawings in Coliboaia Cave in Romania, stylistically comparable to those at Chauvet. An initial dating puts the age of an image in the same range as Chauvet: approximately 32,000 years old.

In Australia, cave paintings have been found on the Arnhem Land plateau showing megafauna that are thought to have been extinct for more than 40,000 years, making this site another candidate for oldest known painting; however, the proposed age is dependent on the estimate of the extinction of the species seemingly depicted. Another Australian site, Nawarla Gabarnmang, has charcoal drawings that have been radiocarbon-dated to 28,000 years, making it the oldest site in Australia and among the oldest in the world for which reliable date evidence has been obtained.

Other examples may date as late as the Early Bronze Age, but the well-known Magdalenian style seen at Lascaux in France (c. 15,000 BC) and Altamira in Spain died out at approximately 10,000 BC, coinciding with the advent of the Neolithic period. Some caves probably continued to be painted over a period of several thousands of years.

The next phase of surviving European prehistoric painting, the rock art of the Iberian Mediterranean Basin, was very different, concentrating on large assemblies of smaller and much less detailed figures, with at least as many humans as animals. This phase was created roughly between 10,000 and 5,500 years ago, and painted in rock shelters under cliffs or shallow caves, in contrast to the recesses of deep caves used in the earlier (and much colder) period. Although individual figures are less naturalistic, they are grouped in coherent grouped compositions to a much greater degree. Over a long period of time, the cave art has become less naturalistic and has graduated from beautiful, naturalistic animal drawings to simple ones, and then to abstract shapes.

== Subjects, themes, and patterns in cave painting ==
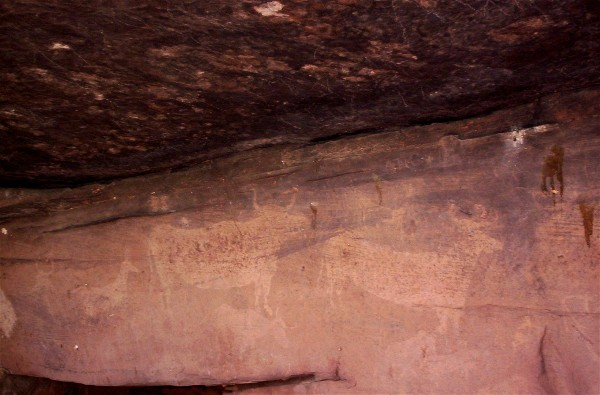
Prehistoric cave painting of animals at Albarracín, Teruel, Spain (rock art of the Iberian Mediterranean Basin)

Cave artists used a variety of techniques such as finger tracings, modeling in clay, engravings, bas-relief sculpture, hand stencils, and paintings done in two or three colors. Scholars classify cave art as "Signs" or abstract marks. The most common subjects in cave paintings are large wild animals, such as bison, horses, aurochs, and deer, and tracings of human hands as well as abstract patterns, called finger flutings. The species found most often were suitable for hunting by humans, but were not necessarily the typical prey found in associated deposits of bones; for example, the painters of Lascaux have mainly left reindeer bones, but this species does not appear at all in the cave paintings, where equine species are the most common. Drawings of humans were rare and are usually schematic as opposed to the more detailed and naturalistic images of animal subjects. Images of vegetation were also rare as plants account for less than 1% of symbols depicted in European cave art. This is peculiar to scientists as the majority of Earth’s biomass is plants. These artists would have used plants for food, medicine, and shelter yet it remains under represented.

A 2012 study found that prehistoric cave artists depicted the walking gait of four-legged animals with greater accuracy than modern artists do, suggesting close observation of prey animals was important for survival. Kieran D. O'Hara, geologist, suggests in his book Cave Art and Climate Change that climate controlled the themes depicted. Pigments used include red and yellow ochre, hematite, manganese oxide, and charcoal. Sometimes the silhouette of the animal was incised in the rock first, and in some caves all or many of the images are only engraved in this fashion, taking them somewhat out of a strict definition of "cave painting". Similarly, large animals are also the most common subjects in the many small carved and engraved bone or ivory (less often stone) pieces dating from the same periods. But these include the group of Venus figurines, which with a few incomplete exceptions have no real equivalent in Paleolithic cave paintings. One counterexample is a figure of a woman in the Chauvet Cave, as described in an interview with Dominique Baffier in Cave of Forgotten Dreams.

Hand stencils, formed by placing a hand against the wall and covering the surrounding area in pigment result in the characteristic image of a roughly round area of solid pigment with the negative shape of the hand in the centre, these may then be decorated with dots, dashes, and patterns. Often, these are found in the same caves as other paintings, or may be the only form of painting in a location. Some walls contain many hand stencils. Similar hands are also painted in the usual fashion. A number of hands show a finger wholly or partly missing, for which a number of explanations have been proposed. Hand images are found in similar forms in Europe, Eastern Asia, Australia, and South America. One site in Baja California features handprints as a prominent motif in its rock art. Archaeological study of this site revealed that, based on the size of the handprints, they most likely belonged to the women of the community. In addition to this, they were likely used during initiation rituals in Chinigchinich religious practices, which were commonly practiced in the Luiseño territory where this site is located.

=== Theories and interpretations ===
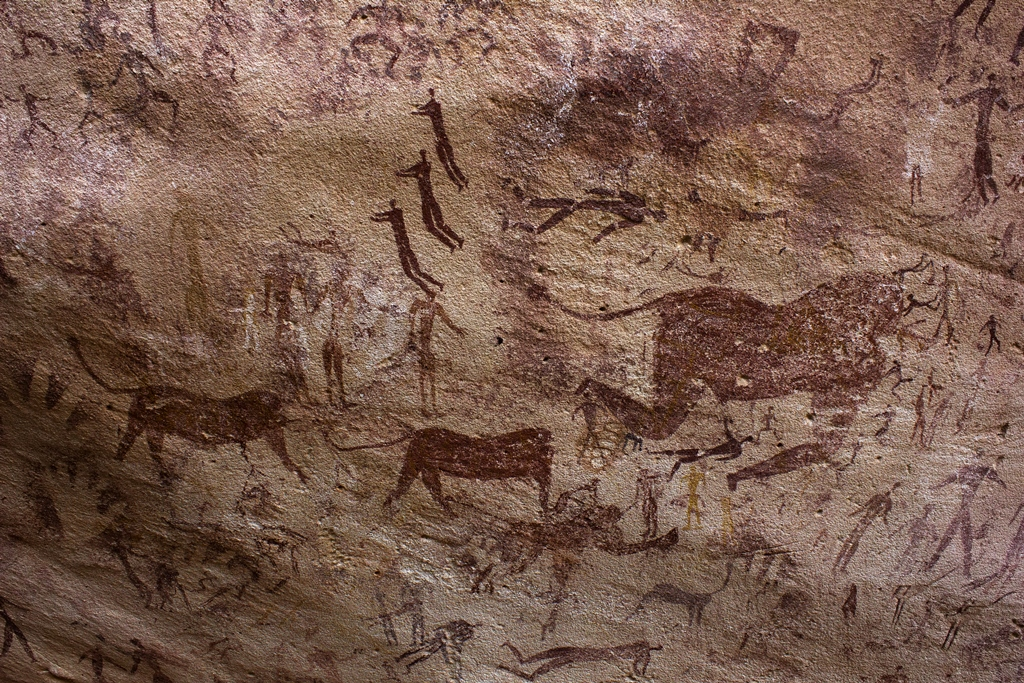
Rock paintings from the Cave of Beasts (Gilf Kebir, Libyan Desert) Estimated 7000 BP

In the early 20th century, following the work of Walter Baldwin Spencer and Francis James Gillen, scholars such as Salomon Reinach, Henri Breuil and Count Bégouën interpreted the paintings as 'utilitarian' hunting magic to increase the abundance of prey. Jacob Bronowski states, "I think that the power that we see expressed here for the first time is the power of anticipation: the forward-looking imagination. In these paintings the hunter was made familiar with dangers which he knew he had to face but to which he had not yet come."

Another theory, developed by David Lewis-Williams and broadly based on ethnographic studies of contemporary hunter-gatherer societies, is that the paintings were made by paleolithic shamans. The shaman would retreat into the darkness of the caves, enter into a trance state, then paint images of their visions, perhaps with some notion of drawing out power from the cave walls themselves.

R. Dale Guthrie, who has studied both highly artistic and lower quality art and figurines, identifies a wide range of skill and age among the artists. He hypothesizes that the main themes in the paintings and other artifacts (powerful beasts, risky hunting scenes and the representation of nude women) are the work of adolescent males, who constituted a large portion of cave painters, based on surrounding hand print analysis. However, in analyzing hand prints and stencils in French and Spanish caves, Dean Snow of Pennsylvania State University has proposed that a proportion of them, including those around the spotted horses in Pech Merle, were of female hands.

Analysis in 2022, led by Bennett Bacon, an amateur archaeologist, along with a team of professional archeologists and psychologists at the University of Durham, including Paul Pettitt and Robert William Kentridge, suggested that lines and dots (and a commonly seen, if curious, "Y" symbol, which was proposed to mean "to give birth") on upper palaeolithic cave paintings correlated with the mating cycle of animals in a lunar calendar, potentially making them the earliest known evidence of a proto-writing system and explaining one object of many cave paintings.

== Paleolithic cave art by region ==
=== Europe ===
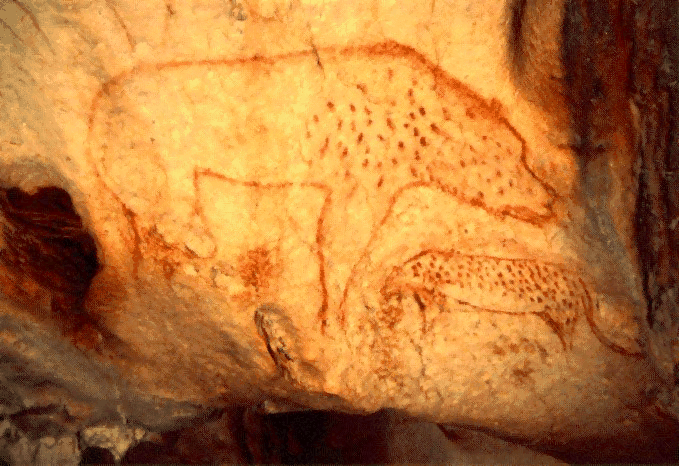
30,000-year-old cave hyena painting found in the Chauvet Cave, France

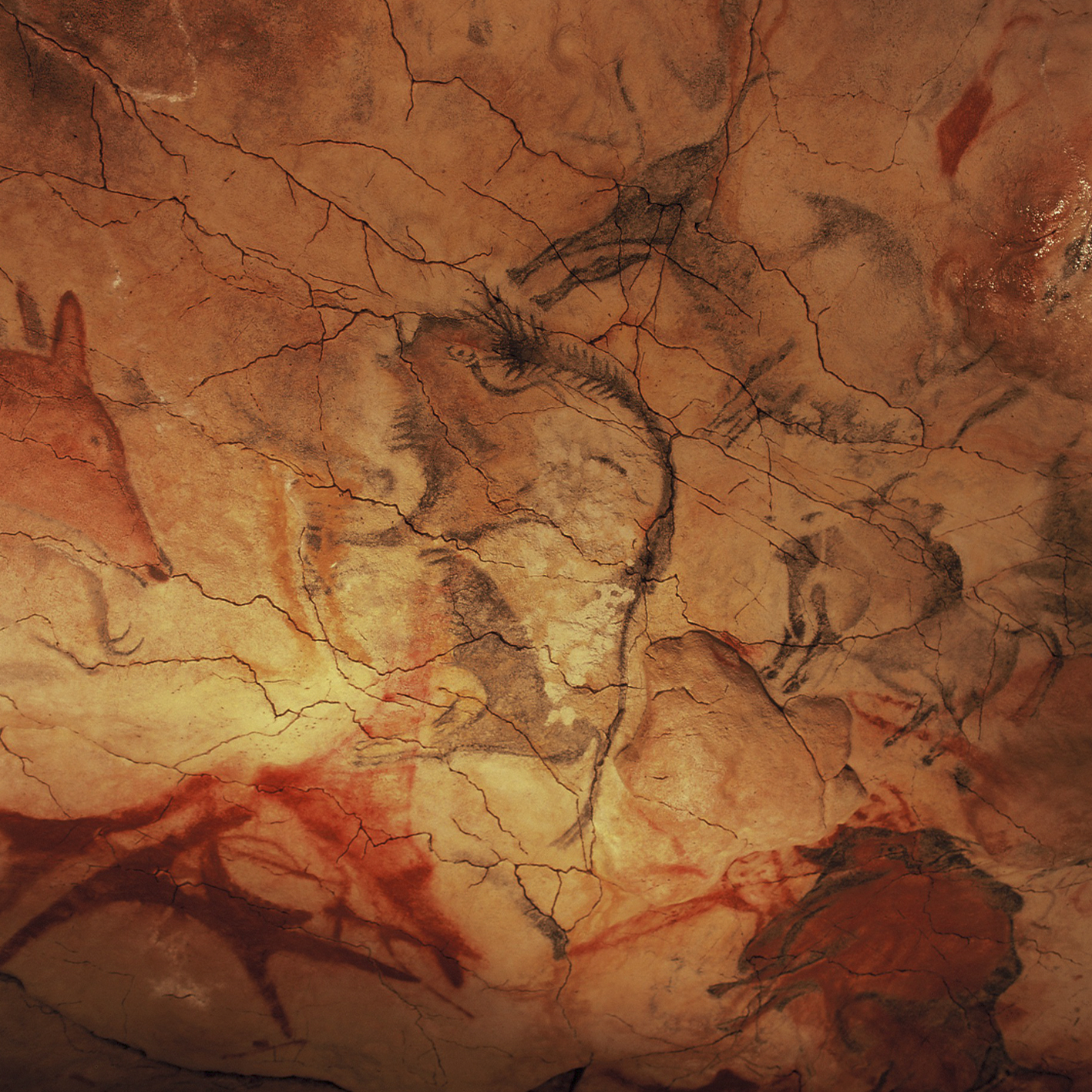
Cave of Altamira and Paleolithic Cave Art of Northern Spain

Well-known cave paintings include those of:

- Cave of El Castillo, Spain (~40,000 y.o.)
- Chauvet Cave, near Vallon-Pont-d'Arc, France (~35,000 y.o.)
- Cave of La Pasiega, Cuevas de El Castillo, Cantabria, Spain (~30,000 y.o.?)
- Caves of Arcy-sur-Cure, France (~28,200 y.o.)
- Cosquer Cave, with an entrance below sea level near Marseille, France (~27,000 y.o.)
- Caves of Gargas, France (~27,000 y.o.)
- Grotte de Cussac, France (~25,000 y.o.)
- Pech Merle, near Cabrerets, France (25,000 y.o.)
- Kapova Cave, Bashkortostan, Russia (~18,000 y.o.), the first cave paintings publicized outside Western Europe
- Lascaux, France (~17,000 y.o.)
- Cave of Niaux, France (~17,000 y.o.)
- Font-de-Gaume, in the Dordogne Valley, France (~17,000 y.o.)
- Badanj Cave, Stolac, Bosnia and Herzegovina (~16,000 y.o., very few engravings are pigmented)
- Cave of Altamira, near Santillana del Mar, Cantabria, Spain (~15,500 y.o.)
- La Marche, in Lussac-les-Châteaux, France (~15,000 y.o.)
- Les Combarelles, in Les Eyzies de Tayac, Dordogne, France (~13,600 y.o.)
- Cave of the Trois-Frères, in Ariège, France (~13,000 y.o.)
- Magura Cave, Bulgaria (~10,000 y.o.)
- Solsem cave, Norway (~3,000 y.o.)

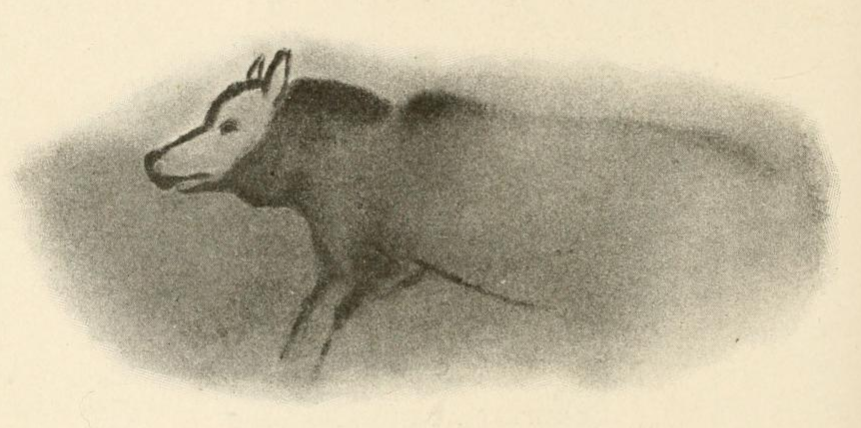
Polychrome cave painting of a wolf, Font-de-Gaume, France

The Ignatievka Cave in the Ural Mountains, which contains the image of a mammoth and 160 other paintings, is supposed to be the northernmost Paleolithic cave painting site, but its dating is problematic. About 60 ochre images in a similar manner have been described from the nearby Serpievka-2 cave.

Sites discovered in the 21st century include Creswell Crags, Nottinghamshire, England (~14,500 ys old cave etchings and bas-reliefs, but no paintings discovered so far) and Peștera Coliboaia in Romania (~29,000 y.o. art?).

Rock painting was also performed on cliff faces; but fewer of those have survived because of erosion. One example is the rock paintings of Astuvansalmi (3,000–2,500 BC) in the Saimaa area of Finland.

When Marcelino Sanz de Sautuola first encountered the Magdalenian paintings of the Cave of Altamira in Cantabria, Spain in 1879, the academics of the time considered them hoaxes. Recent reappraisals and numerous additional discoveries have since demonstrated their authenticity, while at the same time stimulating interest in the artistry and symbolism of Upper Palaeolithic peoples.

=== East and Southeast Asia ===
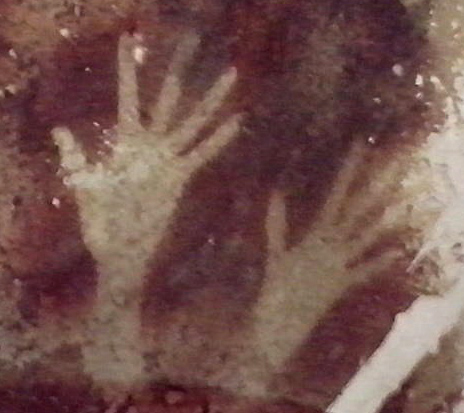
Caves in the Maros-Pangkep karst (Sulawesi, Indonesia). Stencils of right hands estimated between 35,000 and 40,000 BP

In Indonesia the caves in the district of Maros in Sulawesi are famous for their hand prints. About 1,500 negative handprints have also been found in 30 painted caves in the Sangkulirang area of Kalimantan; preliminary dating analysis as of 2005 put their age in the range of 10,000 years old. A 2014 study based on uranium–thorium dating dated a Maros hand stencil to a minimum age of 39,900 years. A painting of a babirusa was dated to at least 35.4 ka, placing it among the oldest known figurative depictions worldwide.

In November 2018, scientists reported the discovery of the oldest known figurative art painting, over 40,000 (perhaps as old as 52,000) years old, of an unknown animal, in the cave of Lubang Jeriji Saléh on the Indonesian island of Borneo.

And more recently, in 2021, archaeologists announced the discovery of cave art at least 45,500 years old in Leang Tedongnge cave, Indonesia. According to the journal Science Advances, the cave painting of a warty pig is the earliest evidence of human settlement of the region. It has been reported that it is rapidly deteriorating as a result of climate change in the region.

Originating in the Paleolithic period, the rock art found in Khoit Tsenkher Cave, Mongolia, includes symbols and animal forms painted from the walls up to the ceiling. Stags, buffalo, oxen, ibex, lions, Argali sheep, antelopes, camels, elephants, ostriches, and other animal pictorials are present, often forming a palimpsest of overlapping images. The paintings appear brown or red in color, and are stylistically similar to other Paleolithic rock art from around the world but are unlike any other examples in Mongolia.

The Padah-Lin Caves of Burma contain 11,000-year-old paintings and many rock tools.

=== India ===
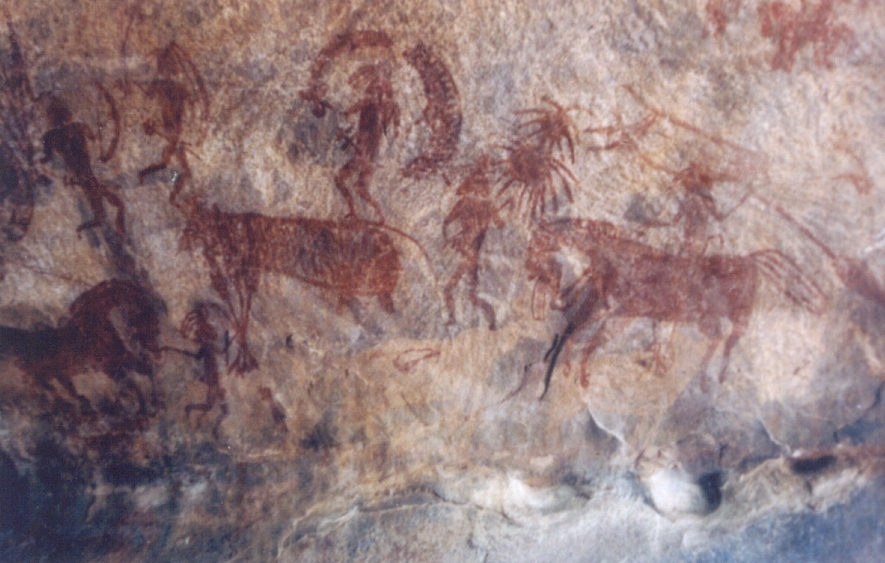
Bhimbetka rock painting

aThe Ambadevi rock shelters have the oldest cave paintings in India, dating back to 25,000 years. The Bhimbetka rock shelters are dated to about 8,000 BC. Similar paintings are found in other parts of India as well. In Tamil Nadu, ancient Paleolithic Cave paintings are found in Kombaikadu, Kilvalai, Settavarai and Nehanurpatti. In Odisha they are found in Yogimatha and Gudahandi. In Karnataka, these paintings are found in Hiregudda near Badami. The most recent painting, consisting of geometric figures, date to the medieval period. Executed mainly in red and white with the occasional use of green and yellow, the paintings depict the lives and times of the people who lived in the caves, including scenes of childbirth, communal dancing and drinking, religious rites and burials, as well as indigenous animals.

Three prehistoric rock paintings in white ochre, believed to be approximately 2,500 years old, were discovered at Mealpattimalai, about 5 km from Krishnagiri town on the Krishnagiri–Maharajakadai road in Tamil Nadu. The paintings depict two human figures riding horses on either side of a boulder, with an unidentified symbol in the centre. Archaeologist Murugan suggested that the paintings may have been created in tribute to soldiers who died in a war. Krishnagiri district contains 16 known prehistoric rock art sites, many located on dolmens and the ceilings of rock shelters.

=== Southern Africa ===
Cave paintings found at the Apollo 11 Cave in Namibia are estimated to date from approximately 25,500–27,500 years ago.

In 2011, archaeologists found a small rock fragment at Blombos Cave, about 300 km (190 mi) east of Cape Town on the southern cape coastline in South Africa, among spear points and other excavated material. After extensive testing for seven years, it was revealed that the lines drawn on the rock were handmade and from an ochre crayon dating back 73,000 years. This makes it the oldest known rock painting.

=== Australia ===
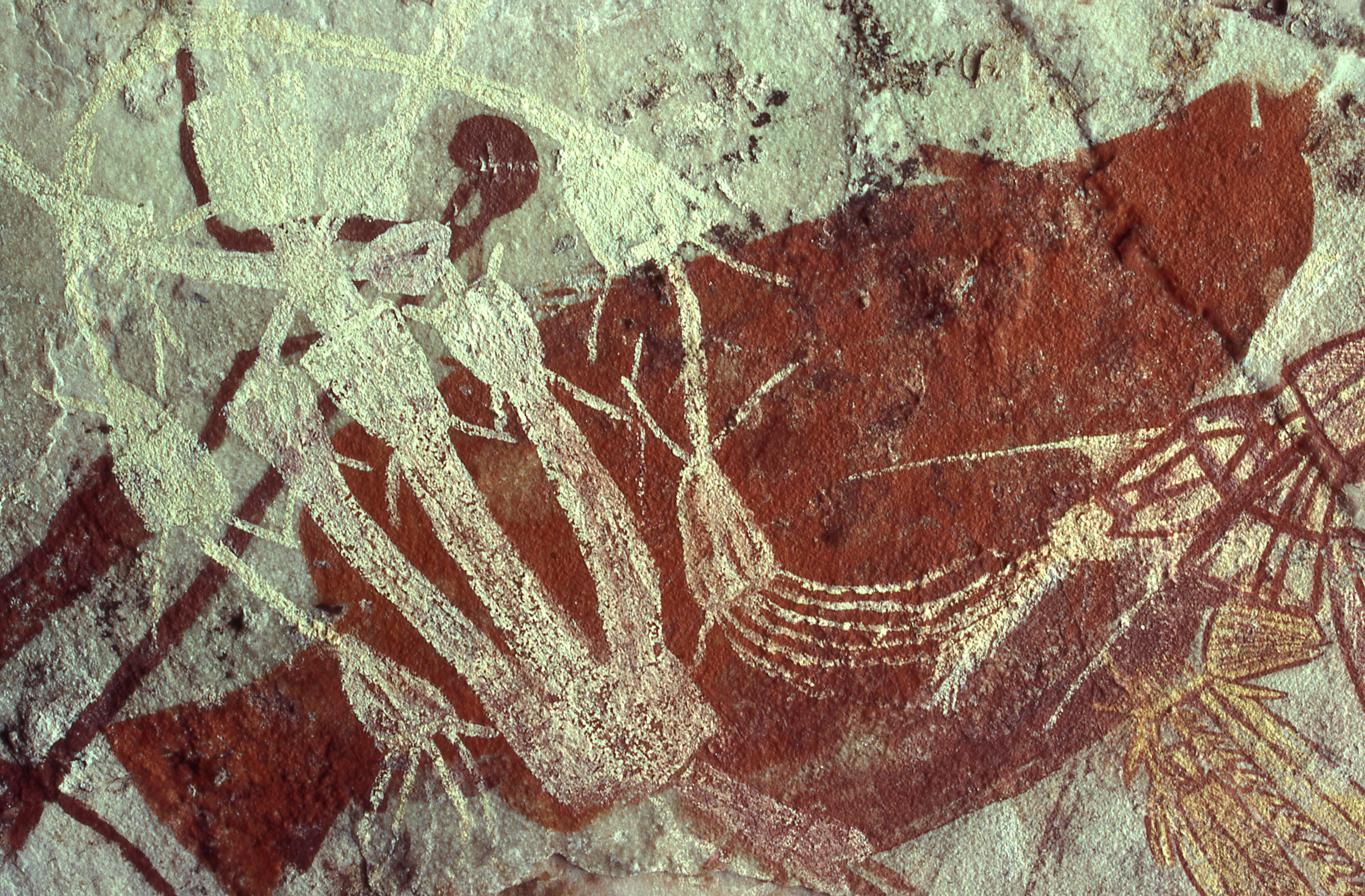
Painting at Jabiru Dreaming, Kakadu National Park

Significant early cave paintings, executed in ochre, have been found in Kimberley and Kakadu, Australia. Ochre is not an organic material, so carbon dating of these pictures is often impossible. The oldest so far dated at 17,300 years is an ochre painting of a kangaroo in the Kimberley region, which was dated by carbon dating wasp nest material underlying and overlying the painting. Sometimes the approximate date, or at least, an epoch, can be surmised from the painting content, contextual artifacts, or organic material intentionally or inadvertently mixed with the inorganic ochre paint, including torch soot.

A red ochre painting, discovered at the centre of the Arnhem Land Plateau, depicts two emu-like birds with their necks outstretched. They have been identified by a palaeontologist as depicting the megafauna species Genyornis, giant birds thought to have become extinct more than 40,000 years ago; however, this evidence is inconclusive for dating. It may suggest that Genyornis became extinct at a later date than previously determined.

Hook Island in the Whitsunday Islands is also home to a number of cave paintings created by the seafaring Ngaro people.

== Holocene cave art ==
=== Asia ===
The Edakkal Caves of Kerala, India, contain drawings that range over periods from the Neolithic as early as 5,000 BC to 1,000 BC.

=== Horn of Africa ===
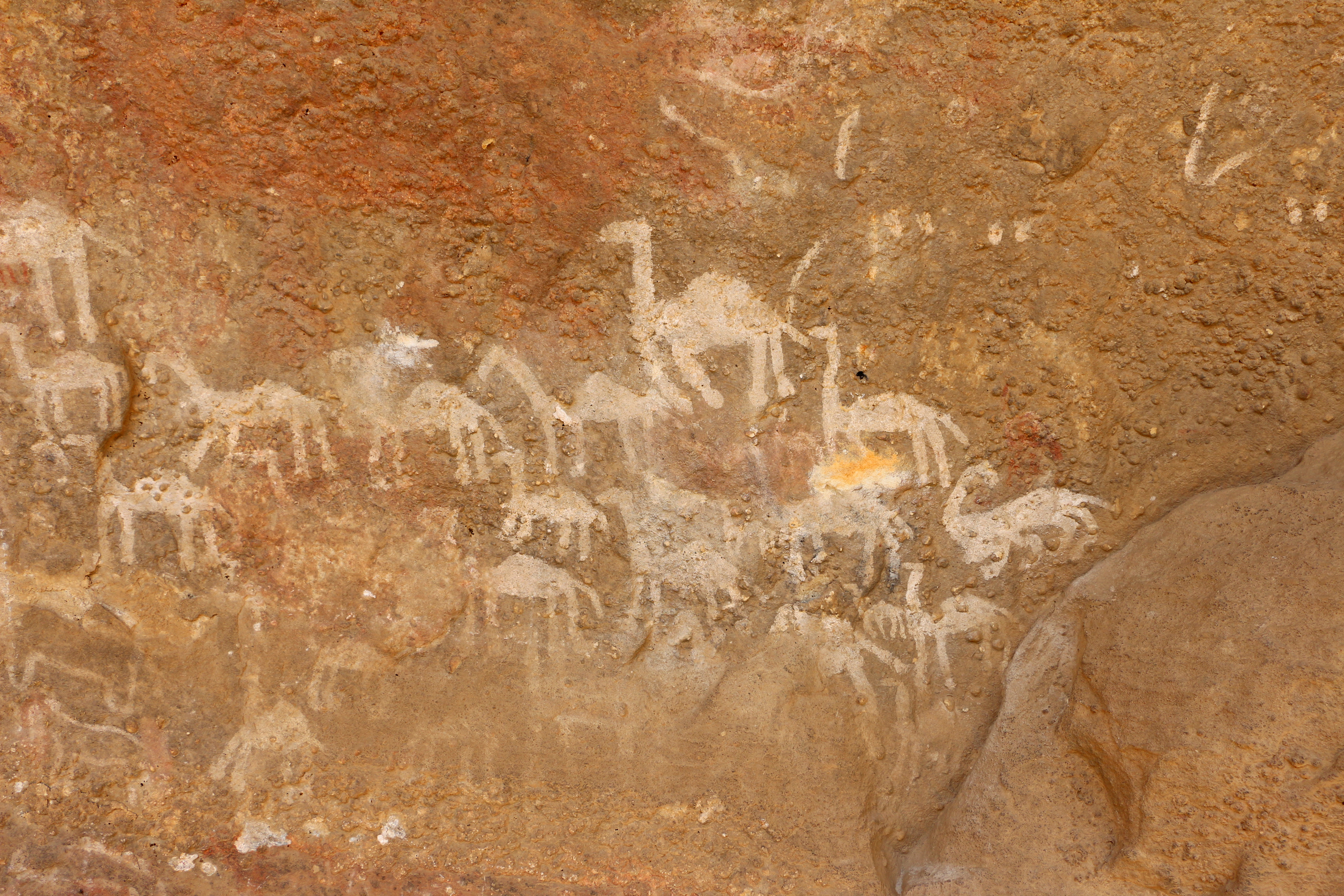
Rock art in the Adi Alauti cave, Eritrea

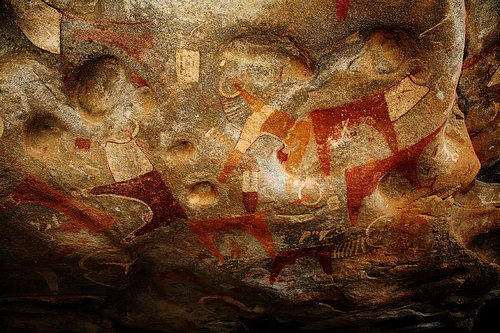
Cave paintings at the Laas Geel complex in northern Somaliland.

Rock art near Qohaito appears to indicate habitation in the area since the fifth millennium BC, while the town is known to have survived to the sixth century CE. Mount Emba Soira, Eritrea's highest mountain, lies near the site, as does a small successor village. Much of the rock art sites are found together with evidence of prehistoric stone tools, suggesting that the art could predate the widely presumed pastoralist and domestication events that occurred 5,000– 4,000 years ago.

In 2002, a French archaeological team discovered the Laas Geel cave paintings on the outskirts of Hargeisa in Somaliland. Dating back around 5,000 years, the paintings depict both wild animals and decorated cows. They also feature herders, who are believed to be the creators of the rock art. In 2008, Somali archaeologists announced the discovery of other cave paintings in Dhambalin region, which the researchers suggest includes one of the earliest known depictions of a hunter on horseback. The rock art is dated to 1000 to 3000 BCE.

Additionally, between the towns of Las Khorey and El Ayo in Karinhegane is a site of numerous cave paintings of real and mythical animals. Each painting has an inscription below it, which collectively have been estimated to be around 2,500 years old. Karihegane's rock art is in the same distinctive style as the Laas Geel and Dhambalin cave paintings. Around 25 miles from Las Khorey is found Gelweita, another key rock art site.

In Djibouti, rock art of what appear to be antelopes and a giraffe are also found at Dorra and Balho.

=== North Africa ===
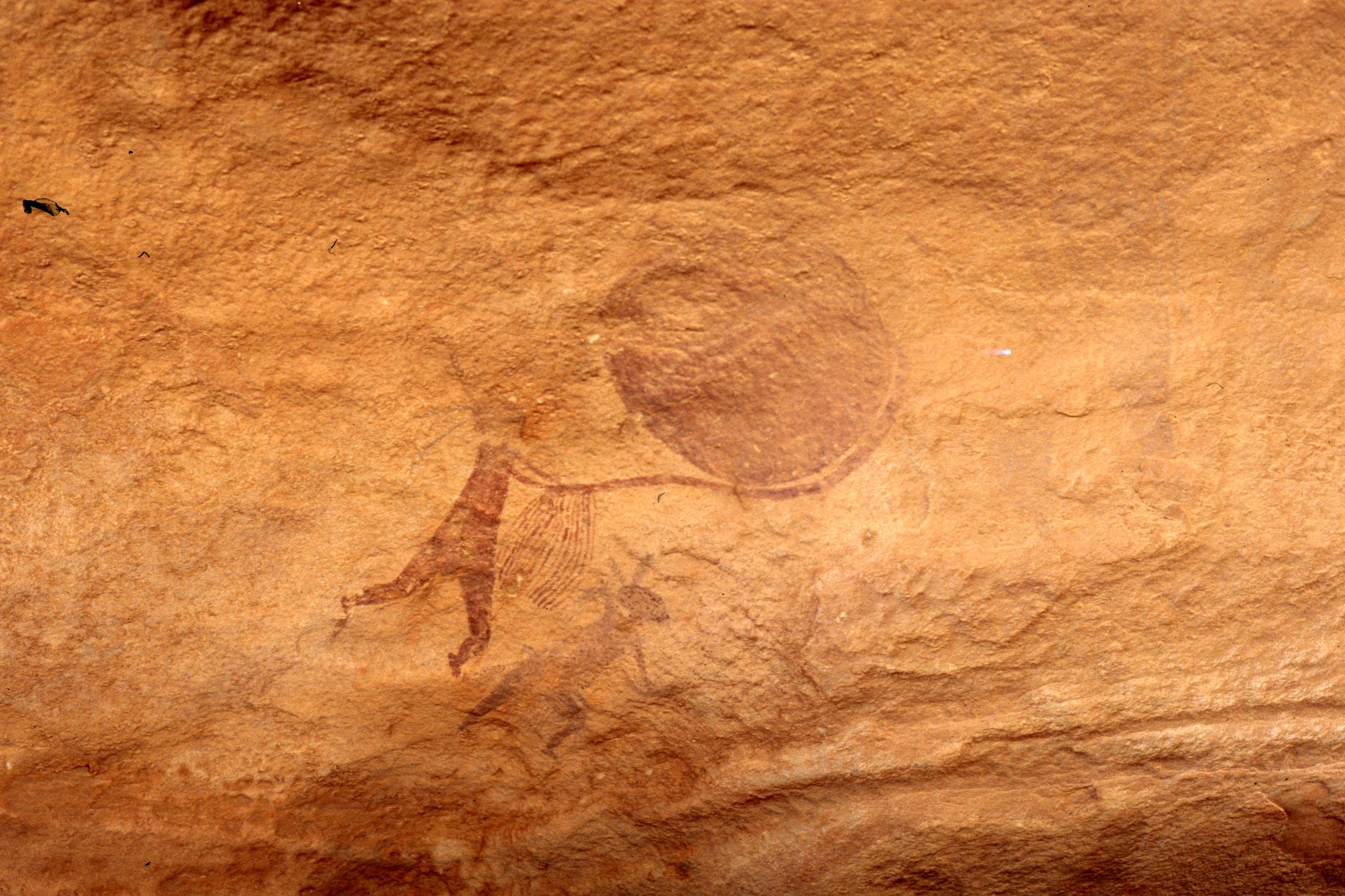
Cave painting at the Tassili n'Ajjer UNESCO World Heritage Site in southeast Algeria.

Many cave paintings are found in the Tassili n'Ajjer mountains in southeast Algeria. A UNESCO World Heritage Site, the rock art was first discovered in 1933 and has since yielded 15,000 engravings and drawings that keep a record of the various animal migrations, climatic shifts, and change in human inhabitation patterns in this part of the Sahara from 6000 BC to the late classical period. Other cave paintings are also found at the Akakus, Mesak Settafet and Tadrart in Libya and other Sahara regions including: Ayr mountains, Niger and Tibesti, Chad.

The Cave of Swimmers and the Cave of Beasts in southwest Egypt, near the border with Libya, in the mountainous Gilf Kebir region of the Sahara Desert. The Cave of Swimmers was discovered in October 1933 by the Hungarian explorer László Almásy. The site contains rock painting images of people swimming, which are estimated to have been created 10,000 years ago during the time of the most recent Ice Age.

In 2020, limestone cave decorated with scenes of animals such as donkeys, camels, deer, mule and mountain goats was uncovered in the area of Wadi Al-Zulma by the archaeological mission from the Tourism and Antiquities Ministry. Rock art cave is 15 meters deep and 20 meters high.

=== Southern Africa ===
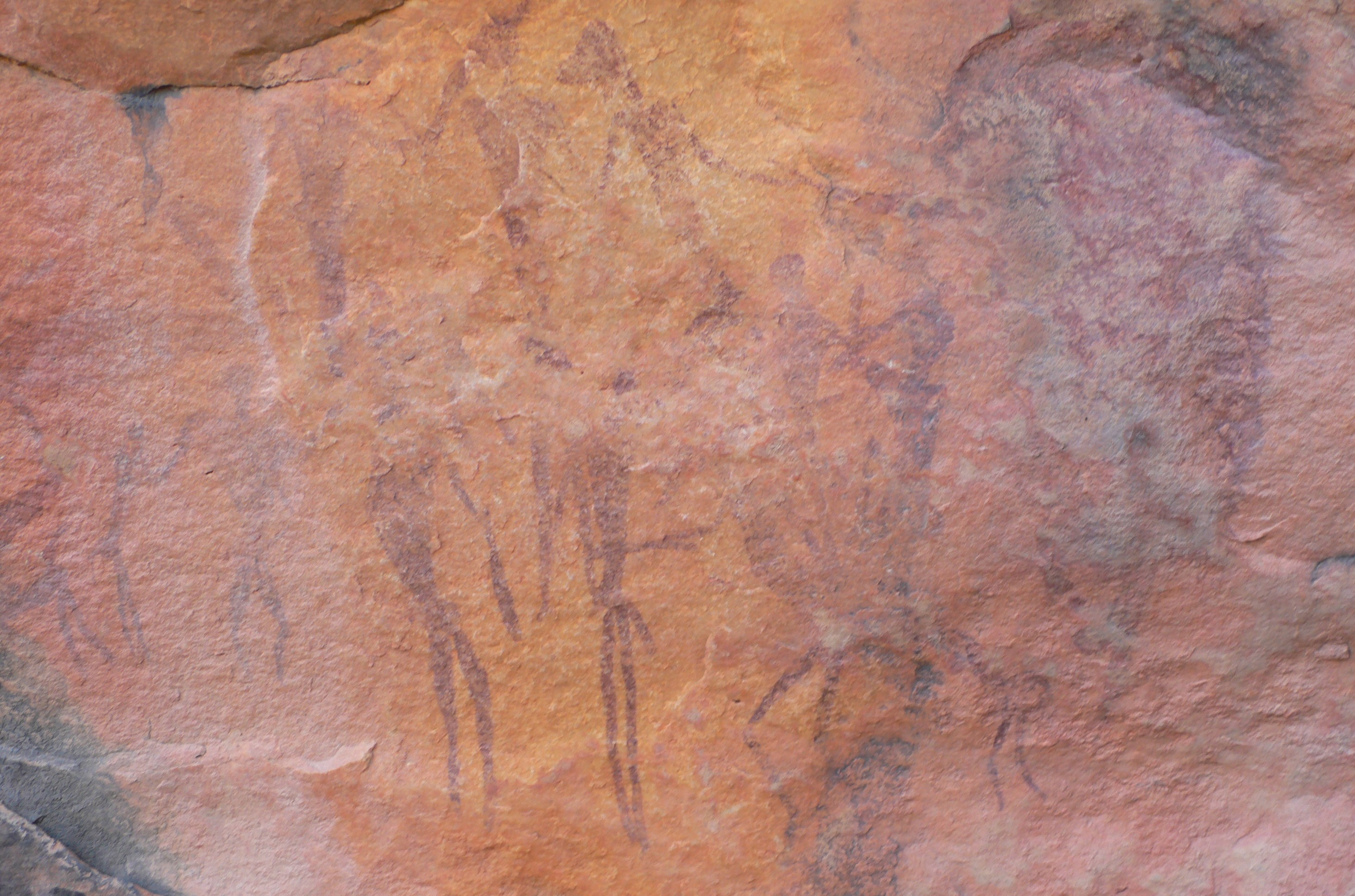
San rock paintings from the Western Cape in South Africa.

At uKhahlamba / Drakensberg Park, South Africa, now thought to be some 3,000 years old, the paintings by the San people who settled in the area some 8,000 years ago depict animals and humans, and are thought to represent religious beliefs. Human figures are much more common in the rock art of Africa than in Europe.

=== North America ===
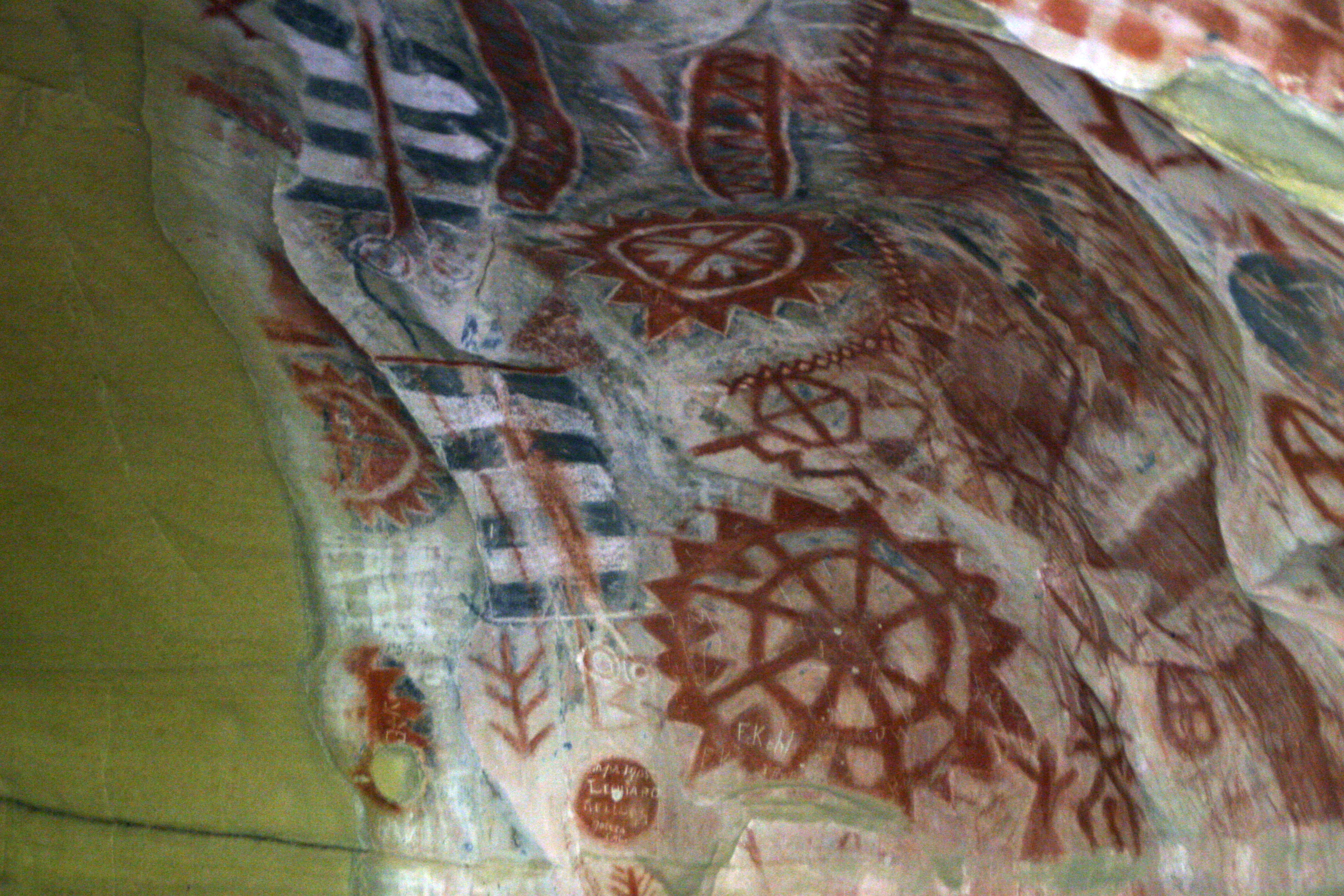
Painted Cave, Santa Barbara County, California

Distinctive monochrome and polychrome cave paintings and murals exist in the mid-peninsula regions of southern Baja California and northern Baja California Sur, consisting of Pre-Columbian paintings of humans, land animals, sea creatures, and abstract designs. These paintings are mostly confined to the sierras of this region, but can also be found in outlying mesas and rock shelters. According to recent radiocarbon studies of the area, of materials recovered from archaeological deposits in the rock shelters and on materials in the paintings themselves, suggest that the Great Murals may have a time range extending as far back as 7,500 years ago.

California

Native artists in the Chumash tribes created cave paintings that are located in present-day Santa Barbara, Ventura, and San Luis Obispo Counties in Southern California in the United States. They include examples at Burro Flats Painted Cave and Chumash Painted Cave State Historic Park.

There are also Native American pictogram examples in caves of the Southwestern United States. Cave art that is 6,000 years old was found in the Cumberland Plateau region of Tennessee.

Native American tribes have contributed to the makings of Californian cave art, whether it be in Northern or Baja California. The Chumash people of Southern and Baja California made paintings in Swordfish Cave. It was given its name after the swordfish that are painted on its walls and is a sacred site for religious and cultural practices of the Chumash tribe. It was under attack of demolition, which prompted the start of its conservation with cooperation between the Vandenberg Air Force Base and the Tribal Elders Council of the Santa Ynez Band of Chumash. These two parties were able to stabilize and conserve the cave and its art. When previously studied, there were many conclusions about how the paintings were made but not a lot of conclusions about the symbolic value of the rock art and what its meaning to the Chumash tribe. The excavation of the inside of the cave became a viewing area for archaeologists and anthropologists, specifically Clayton Lebow, Douglas Harrow, and Rebecca McKim, to find out the symbolic meaning of the art. Some of the tools that were used to make the pictographs were found in the site and were connected to the two early occupations that were in the area. This pushed back the general knowledge of understood antiquity of rock art on California's Central Coast by more than 2,000 years.

==== Northern and Baja California ====
The National Institution of Anthropology and History (INAH) established in Mexico recorded over 1,500 rock art related archaeological monuments in Baja California. A little under 300 of the sites were connected to Native American Tribes. Throughout these 300 sites, 65% have paintings, 24% have petroglyphs, 10% have both paintings and petroglyphs, and 1% have geoglyphs. Five of these sites located in Baja California show hand designs or paintings, and they all spread out in that area. These sites include Milagro de Guadalupe (23 imprints), Corral de Queno (6 imprints), Rancho Viejo (1 drawing), Piedras Gordas (5 imprints), and finally Valle Seco (3 imprints).

=== South America ===
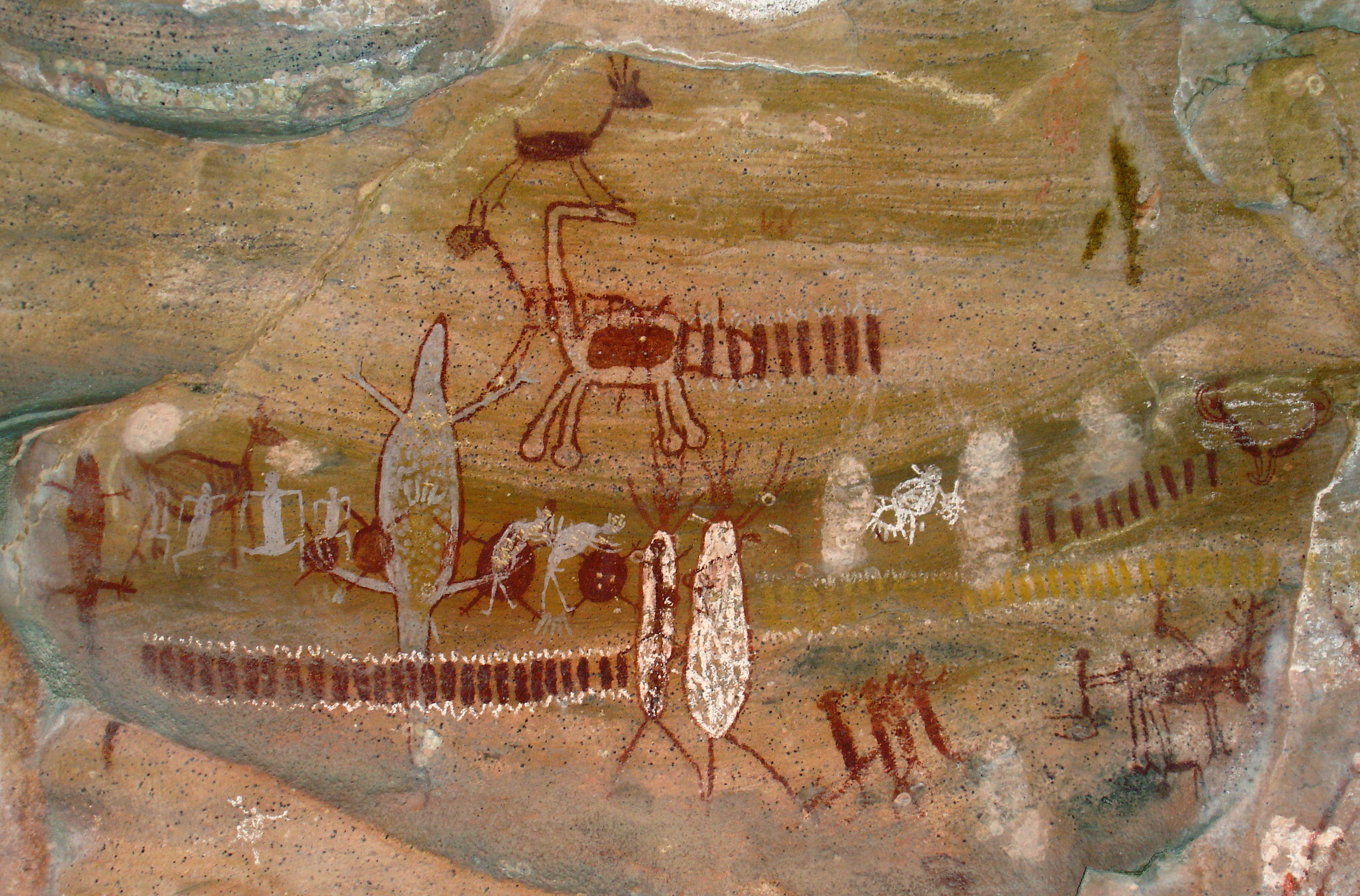
Cave painting at Serra da Capivara National Park, Brazil

Serra da Capivara National Park is a national park in the north east of Brazil with many prehistoric paintings; the park was created to protect the prehistoric artifacts and paintings found there. It became a World Heritage Site in 1991. Its best known archaeological site is Pedra Furada.

It is located in northeast state of Piauí, between latitudes 8° 26' 50" and 8° 54' 23" south and longitudes 42° 19' 47" and 42° 45' 51" west. It falls within the municipal areas of São Raimundo Nonato, São João do Piauí, Coronel José Dias and Canto do Buriti. It has an area of 1291.4 square kilometres (319,000 acres). The area has the largest concentration of prehistoric small farms on the American continents. Scientific studies confirm that the Capivara mountain range was densely populated in prehistoric periods.

Cueva de las Manos (Spanish for "Cave of the Hands") is a cave located in the province of Santa Cruz, Argentina, 163 km (101 mi) south of the town of Perito Moreno, within the borders of the Francisco P. Moreno National Park, which includes many sites of archaeological and paleontological importance.

The hand images are often negative (stencilled). Besides these there are also depictions of human beings, guanacos, rheas, felines and other animals, as well as geometric shapes, zigzag patterns, representations of the sun, and hunting scenes. Similar paintings, though in smaller numbers, can be found in nearby caves. There are also red dots on the ceilings, probably made by submerging their hunting bolas in ink, and then throwing them up. The colours of the paintings vary from red (made from hematite) to white, black or yellow. The negative hand impressions date to around 550 BC, the positive impressions from 180 BC, while the hunting drawings are calculated to more than 10,000 years old. Most of the hands are "left hands" (that is, with thumb on the right, even though this pattern can be obtained as easily with both right and left hands, depending on whether the back or front is used) which has been used as an argument to suggest that painters held the spraying pipe with their right hand.

=== Southeast Asia ===
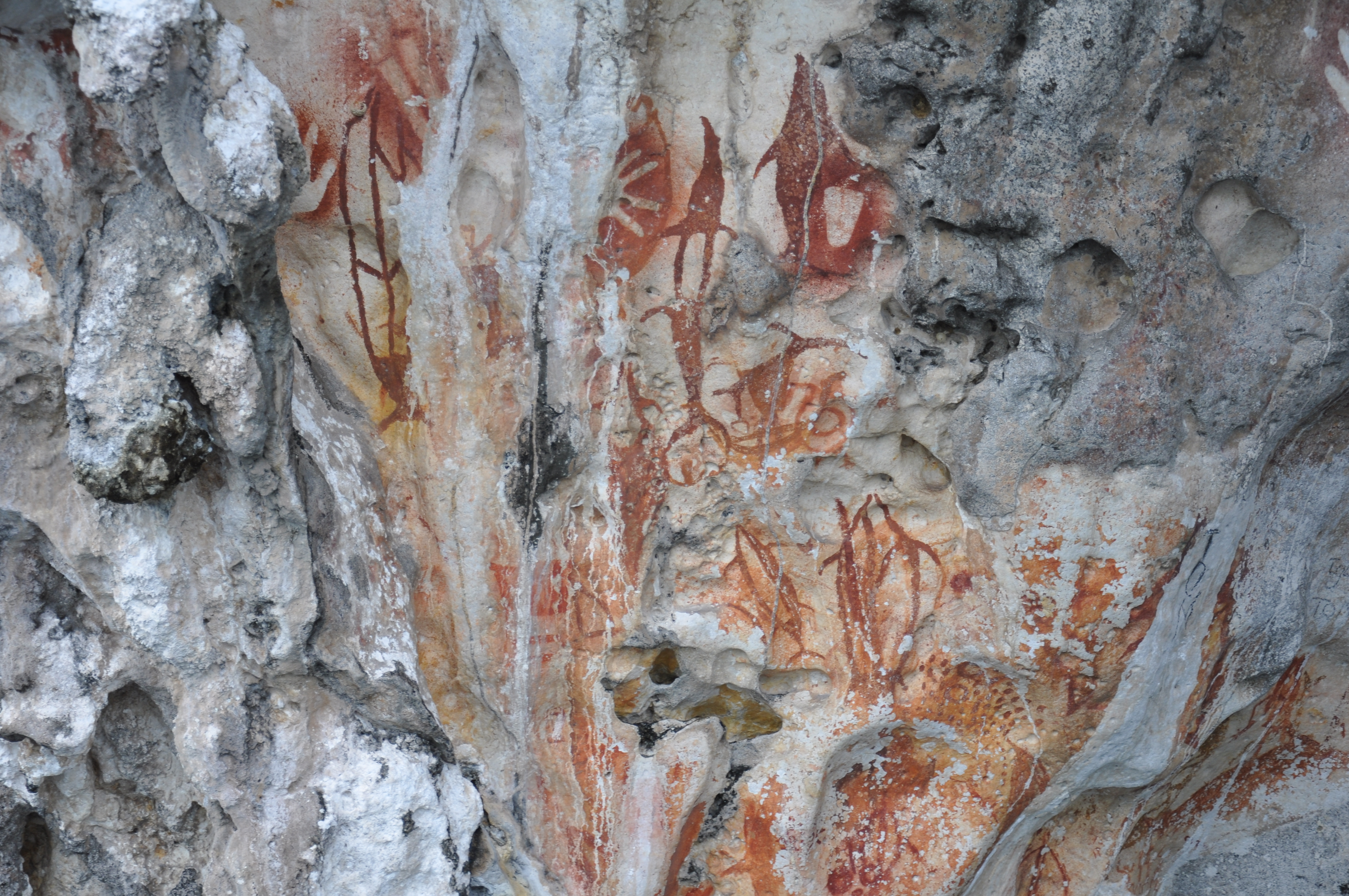
Rock painting in Misool, Raja Ampat, Indonesia

There are rock paintings in caves in Thailand, Malaysia, Indonesia, and Burma. In Thailand, caves and scarps along the Thai-Burmese border, in the Petchabun Range of Central Thailand, and overlooking the Mekong River in Nakorn Sawan Province, all contain galleries of rock paintings. In Malaysia, the Tambun rock art is dated at 2000 years, and those in the Painted Cave at Niah Caves National Park are 1200 years old. The anthropologist Ivor Hugh Norman Evans visited Malaysia in the early 1920s and found that some of the tribes (especially Negritos) were still producing cave paintings and had added depictions of modern objects including what are believed to be automobiles. (See prehistoric Malaysia.)

In Indonesia, rock paintings can be found in Sumatra, Kalimantan, Sulawesi, Flores, Timor, Maluku and Papua.

== See also ==
- List of Stone Age art
