= La Marche (cave) =

Cave and archaeological site in France

La Marche Cave
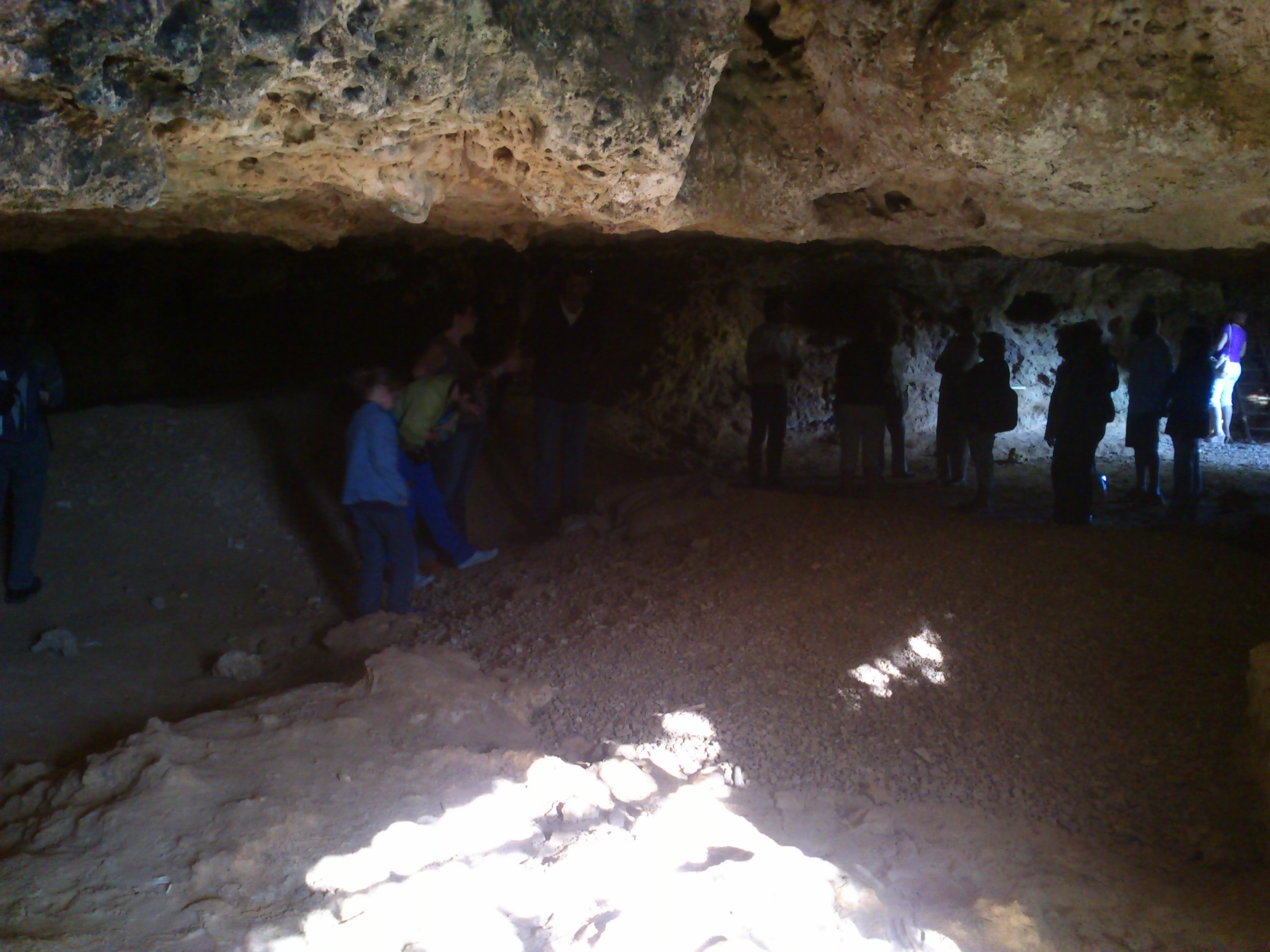
- La Marche Cave

- Location in France
- 46°24′22″N 0°43′28.6″E
- Location: Lussac-les-Châteaux
- Region: department of Vienne, western France

La Marche (French pronunciation: [la maʁʃ]) is a cave and archaeological site located in Lussac-les-Châteaux, a commune in the department of Vienne, western France. It is an archaeological site that has engendered much debate that has not been resolved to date. The carved etchings discovered there in 1937 show detailed depictions of humans and animals that may be 15,000 years old. The cave paintings at this site, however, are controversial and many doubt their authenticity.

== Location ==
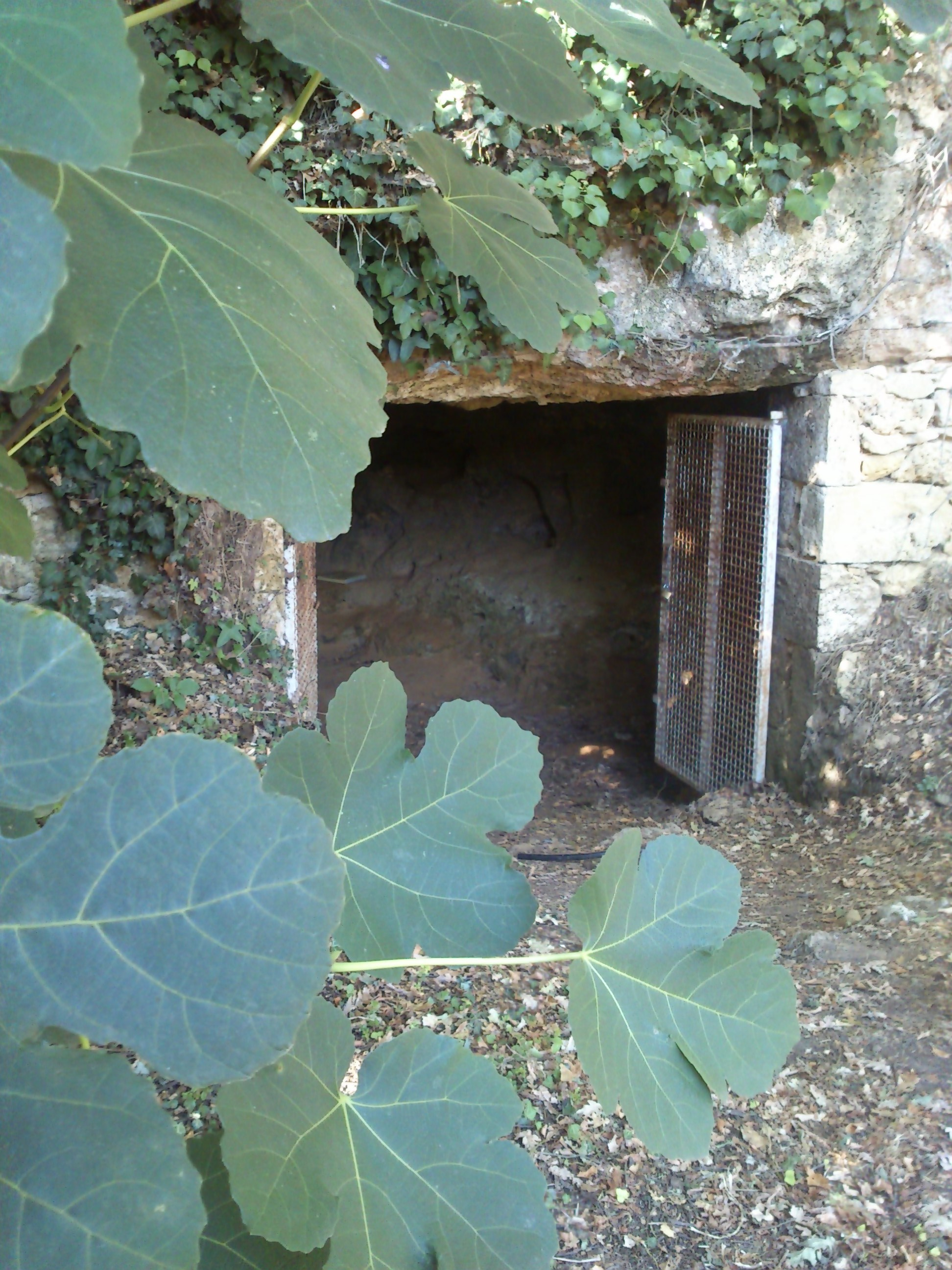
Cave entrance

The La Marche cave is located in the Lussac-les-Châteaux area of western France. It is at the bottom of a small valley bordered by the Petit Moulin river. It most likely is the result of the underground tunneling of the river. Of the 350 known sites of European cave art from the Ice Age, almost half are located in this country. In addition to La Marche, several other important cave sites from the Paleolithic period have been discovered in France including those at Lascaux, Niaux, Trois Frères, Font-de-Gaume and Les Combarelles, Chauvet, Cosquer, Cussac, and Rouffignac.

The artwork found in La Marche is specifically from the middle Magdalenian period, dating to approximately 14,000 or 15,000 years before the current era (BCE). Factors that made La Marche an ideal archaeological site for artwork include its usefulness as a shelter to prehistoric humans, the cultural preferences of these early people, and its relatively good preservation.

== History ==
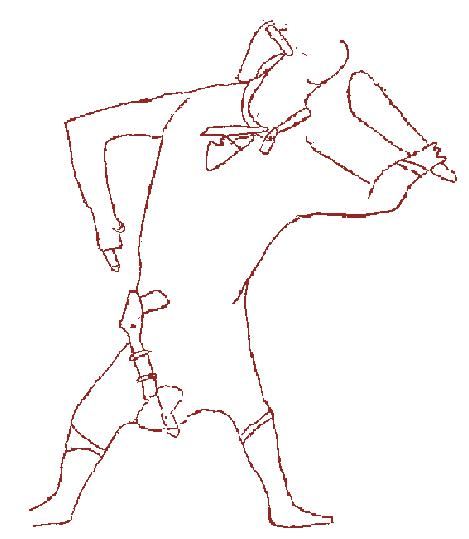
Representation of a human figure, in a cave painting at La Marche

The La Marche cave paintings were discovered in the caves in the Lussac-les-Châteaux area of France by Léon Péricard in November 1937. Péricard, and his partner Stephane Lwoff, studied these caves for five years and found etchings on more than 1,500 slabs. In 1938, they presented their discovery to the French Prehistoric Society, and published them in the Society's Bulletin. Many people questioned the validity of these findings, however, stating that they made that judgment because the paintings closely resembled modern art.

In the lectures that Lwoff gave about the caves, he gave his audience false information, thus discrediting the findings of the team significantly. The initial effect was that the caves failed to be considered as important discoveries.

The caves were studied again in 1938 and 1939 by a French priest, Henri Breuil. Breuil's results were similar to Péricard's findings, and therefore, more people began to believe in the authenticity of the paintings. After this, however, La Marche was not studied until recently.

In 2002, Péricard's findings were reevaluated by Dr. Michael Rappenglueck of LMU Munich. He believes that Péricard's findings are valid and has initiated a more thorough study of the caves. He also states that a large portion of the paintings were lost during Péricard's excavations: in his attempt to examine the walls, Péricard completely ignored the cave floors that possibly displayed even more paintings and etchings than the walls, destroying many of these in the process. Dr. Rappenglueck suggests that a detailed study of the cave floors may bring to light pieces of the puzzle advancing the credibility of Péricard's original discovery.

== Finds at La Marche ==
When French scientist Léon Péricard excavated La Marche between 1937 and 1942, he catalogued more than 1,500 slabs of limestone that had been placed carefully on the floor.

In the past two decades an extensive inventory of the cave has been taken. 1,512 pieces have been found and numbered, 386 of which were deemed as compositional entities. The content of these etchings include animals, such as lions and bears, along with 155 depictions of humans, clad in robes and boots, each with their own well-defined faces.

=== Style ===
The intricate portraits found in La Marche do not resemble the stick figure style that commonly had been found before that time in prehistoric cave paintings. Instead, these portraits are more lifelike and realistic. The engravings also are more complex and present in higher qualities than at other sites. Many of the figures are superimposed over one another with a single figure cut out multiple times. This style made the engravings hard to isolate and decipher when they were first discovered in 1937 and also added to the doubt of the site's authenticity.

=== Humans ===
Péricard originally found 69 human figurines in the caves. There were 49 etchings of heads alone and 18 with the whole body. All together, there were 50 etchings of females, 12 of males, and 5 that were of indeterminate gender. Eventually, 155 human figurines were found.

When studying the heads and faces of the human etchings, Péricard took detailed observations of the eyes, ears, and nose. He also studied skull structure, such as the shape of the chin and cheekbones. He noticed that there were different types of facial features for each etching. This shows that the etchings were differentiated for different people. A person was identified by certain facial characteristics and this was mirrored by the etching. This differentiation can extend to simply determining the gender of the subject. By combining different facial features, scientists often are able to determine the gender of a figure by its face alone because of gender differences in structures.

The etchings of the bodies in La Marche have distinct characteristics as well. Generally, the etchings are those of women. The bodies of the women were constructed in a diamond shape, with a small head, large abdomens suggesting obesity, and small feet. Men also were etched with large bodies, although this was not so prominent in the men as it was in the women. Bodies also are extremely useful in determining the gender of an etching, in that they portrayed the secondary sex characteristics. In addition, many of the engravings show people wearing hats, robes, and boots. Although this does not coincide with the previously accepted view of prehistoric people, it may be because paintings depicting clothed humans were destroyed in the other caves while scientists were studying the walls.

=== Constellations ===
Additionally, Dr. Michael Rappenglueck has noted pits arranged like certain star constellations on the cave floor. One constellation on La Marche's floor, the Pleiades, has been found engraved on the walls of Neolithic caves, but rarely on those of the Paleolithic. Dr. Rappenglueck has suggested that these pits might have been filled with animal fat and set on fire to replicate the stars in the sky. If so, Rappenglueck ventures, this site could mark the origin of the candlelit festivals in the Far East that also celebrate the Pleiades.

== Controversy ==
=== At the time of discovery ===
Péricard and Lwoff were the main contributors to the discovery and created the original documents concerning the findings at La Marche. These documents focused mostly the depictions of humans. When the documents were presented before the French Prehistoric Society, they were greeted with skepticism. This especially came from their colleagues in the northern region of France, which was occupied by Germany during that period of World War II.

The publication of the discovery in 1941 did not present information that coincided with the original documents created and presented by Lwoff and Péricard. Although certain commentaries by Lwoff and Péricard were meant to open up a discussion about the site's validity, the reaction was one of skepticism. More doubt was raised due to a number of lectures regarding La Marche given by Lwoff. Lwoff's lectures included incorrect facts. This point may be noted in one of the lectures given by Lwoff in Paris regarding L'homme de Lussac.

At the same time, the French Prehistoric Society supported the findings at La Marche and attested to the authenticity of the paintings even if some of the details were questionable. The official report from the French Prehistoric Society states that the findings at La Marche are completely authentic. This statement was not enough to quell the skepticism of many prehistorians, however.

It seems that the skepticism was not disarmed until 1942 at the reception of a letter and report from a priest and archaeologist, Henri Breuil. This priest had been to La Marche and searched it for three weeks, seeing all of the material found from its discovery up until April 1940. Ultimately, his report dispelled much of the doubt and skepticism within the archaeological community.

More recently French archaeologist André Leroi-Gourhan analyzed the technique of the etchings. His findings indicate that the drawings are too complicated to come from the era to which they have been dated. He believes that the searches do not yield enough hard evidence to be proven authentic. He compared La Marche to another cave, Angles-sur-l'Anglin, which has provided more detailed proof, whereas La Marche's information is not as clear-cut.

The doubt regarding the engravings has had many consequences on the development of the discovery. Due to the high degree of skepticism, the findings were not exposed immediately at the Museum de Saint Germain. This has allowed for further study and preservation of the artifacts found at La Marche. Upon closer examination, the quality and nature of the etchings are extremely important contributions to the study of cave people.

=== Further debates ===
Certain findings at La Marche have led to greater debate over the origin and development of writing systems. In particular, an engraved reindeer antler from La Marche has provided proof that more sophisticated systems of symbols existed during the Paleolithic period than once believed. Francesco d'Errico, an archaeologist who analyzed the antler, sees it as proof that humans at this time had “artificial memory systems,” that enabled them to record various groupings of information.

As a result, this discovery has forced anthropologists to reconsider such fundamental concepts as cognitive evolution and the definition of writing. d’Errico argues that cognitive evolution, or the assumption that writing systems naturally became more complex over time, does not apply in the case of the antler, which contains a more advanced recording system than that of the early Neolithic period. Thus, d’Errico does not agree that artifacts such as the reindeer antler may be classified fairly as from the pre-writing period, as they always have been. This recent debate between archaeologists may be seen as even further proof that scientific opinion is increasingly favoring La Marche as an authentic site.

== See also ==
- Art of the Upper Paleolithic
- List of Stone Age art
