= Kentridge =

Kentridge is a surname. Notable people with the surname include:

- Felicia Kentridge (1930–2015), South African lawyer
- Robert William Kentridge (born 1960), British experimental psychologist
- Sydney Kentridge (born 1922), South African lawyer and judge
- William Kentridge (born 1955), South African artist and filmmaker

== Other ==
- Kentridge High School, in Kent, Washington, United States
