= John Chandos =

English knight

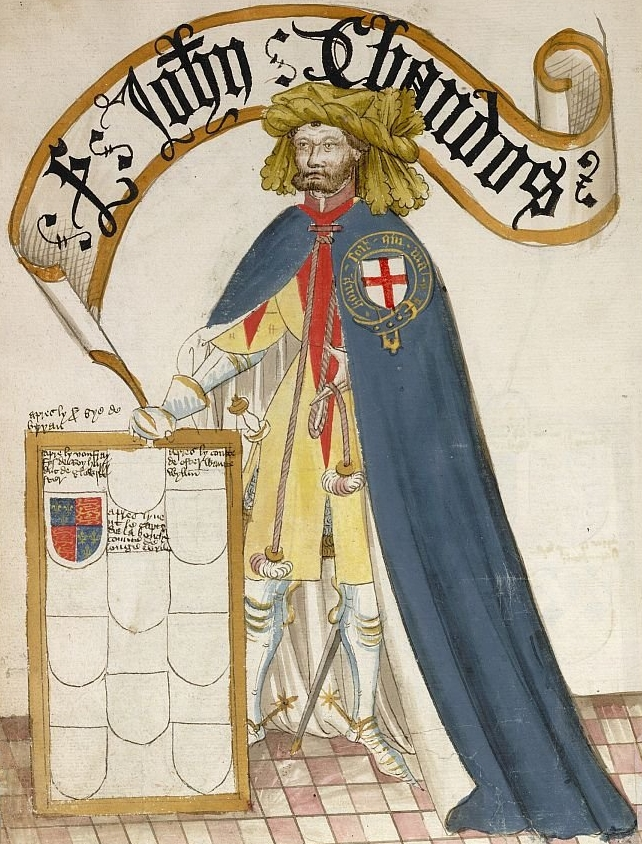
Sir John Chandos from the Bruges Garter Book (1430/1440, BL Stowe 59).

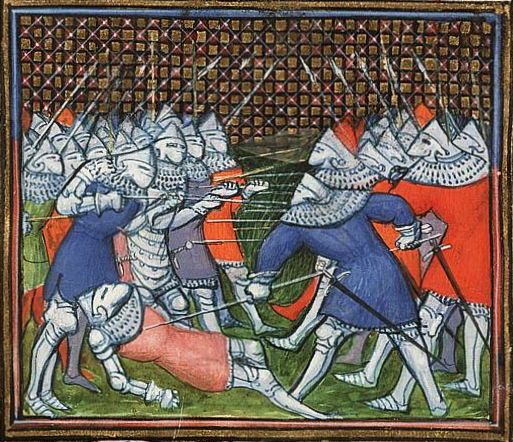
The death of Sir John Chandos at Lussac (illustration from around 1410).

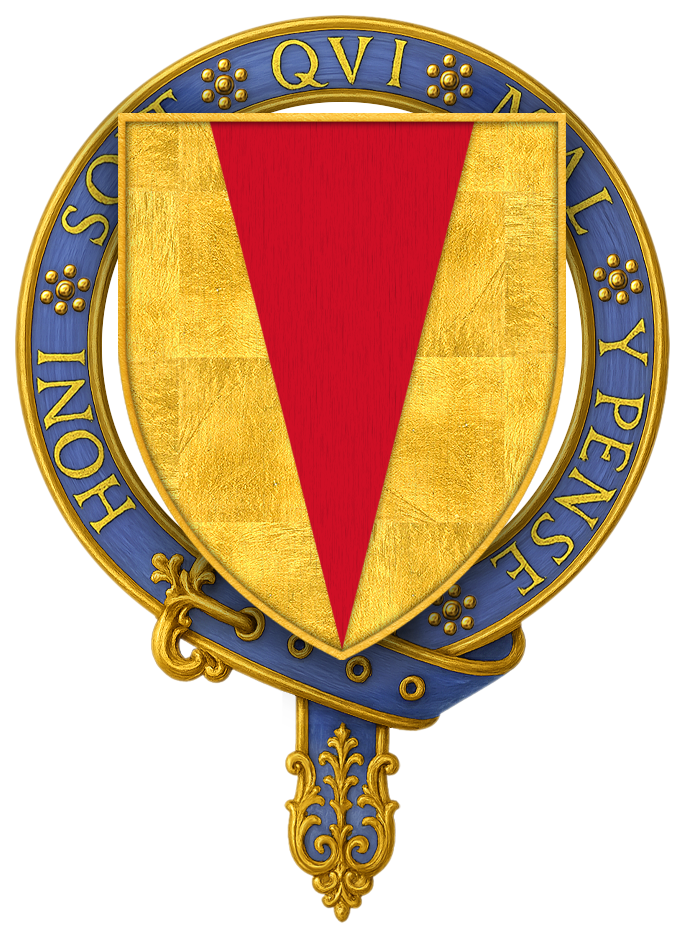
Arms of Sir John Chandos, KG, as illustrated on his Garter stall plate (around 1421) in St George's Chapel, Windsor Castle – Or, a pile gules. which is blazoned throughout.

Chandos arms (as described in seven sources): D'argent, à la pile de gueules.

Sir John Chandos, Viscount of Saint-Sauveur in the Cotentin, Constable of Aquitaine, Seneschal of Poitou, KG (c. 1320 – 31 December 1369) was a medieval English knight who hailed from Radbourne Hall, Derbyshire. Chandos was a close friend of Edward the Black Prince and a founding member and 19th Knight of the Order of the Garter in 1348. Chandos was a gentleman by birth, but unlike most commanders of the day he held no inherited title of nobility.

Described by the medieval historian Froissart as "wise and full of devices", as a military strategist Chandos is believed to have been the mastermind behind three of the most important English victories of the Hundred Years War: the Battle of Crécy, the Battle of Poitiers and the Battle of Auray. His death in a minor skirmish was regretted by both sides.

== Origins ==
Born to an obscure family of landed gentry, Chandos was the son and heir of Sir Edward Chandos, the lord of the manor of Radbourne, Derbyshire. Inevitably, he trained in the arts of war and distinguished himself as a young knight.

== Military career ==
According to the chronicles of Henry Knighton, on the eve of the Battle of Sluys, Edward III anchored his fleet at Blankenberge and sent ashore Chandos with Sir Reginald Cobham and Sir Stephen Lambkin to reconnoitre the French fleet. They found that the enemy vessels were ranged in three compact lines and included the captured English prize, the great cog Christopher; the ships were crammed together tightly and anchored at the entrance of the Zwin (also: Zwyn) channel.

Chandos was a leading figure at the Battle of Crécy. As Chief of Staff to Edward, the Black Prince, he designed the strategy that won victory at the Battle of Poitiers in 1356.

In 1360, Chandos was created a knight banneret, which allowed him to hold a banner in battle. This came of being made the Viscount of Saint-Sauveur by Edward III. This is contrary to the Life of the Black Prince, written by the Herald of John Chandos which suggested that Chandos was made a banneret immediately before the Battle of Najera in 1367. Nevertheless, on that occasion, Edward, the Black Prince of Wales, and Aquitaine at that time, merely unfurled the banner for Chandos as a mark of respect.

On 29 September 1364, Chandos led the forces of Duke John de Montfort to victory at the Battle of Auray, winning the Breton War of Succession and enabling de Montfort to become John IV, Duke of Brittany.

In reward for his service, Chandos was created the lieutenant of France, the vice-chamberlain of England and was given the viscounty of Saint-Sauveur in the Cotentin. During the Hundred Years' War, he became constable of Aquitaine. Later, however, after disagreeing with Edward over how the Guyennois should be taxed, he retired to his property in Normandy.

=== Death ===
In 1369, the French launched a successful counterattack, regaining much territory and forcing Edward to recall Chandos, who was appointed seneschal of Poitou and settled in Poitiers. Sir John attempted to deal with the French attempts to regain a foothold in the province. The Bretons John Kerlouët and Louis de Saint Julien Trimouille, lord of Lusignan, had occupied La Roche-Posay and Saint-Savin, a few kilometres from Poitiers. Chandos decided to retake the abbey of Saint-Savin, with a surprise attack under cover of night.

The planned attack failed when, thinking they had been detected by the enemy, Chandos' force retreated towards the bridge across the Vienne at Lussac-les-Châteaux, along the route to Poitiers through Chauvigny. The French, actually unaware of their presence, had decided to follow the same route to harass any English troops. The adversaries met at the bridge of Lussac. In the battle, Chandos' long coat made him slip on the frost. James de Saint-Martin, a squire in the house of Sir Bagnac (or Guillaume Boitel, according to Paul Hay du Chastelet) struck Chandos with his lance, piercing his face below the eye. Chandos' uncle Edward Twyford, standing over his wounded nephew, repulsed the attackers. One of his squires pierced both legs of James Saint-Martin with his sword; Saint-Martin died three days later at Poitiers. John Chandos was carried on a large shield to Morthemer, the nearest English fortress. He died in the night, either on 31 December or the early hours of 1 January 1370, after a day and night of agony, at the age of around 50.

== Legacy ==
When the news of Sir John's death reached the court of Edward III in England, and that of the Black Prince at Guyenne, they were greatly upset. Chandos was not only a great warrior but also an able administrator and a wise politician.

A cenotaph of John Chandos was erected shortly after his death by the English authorities to commemorate the spot where he fell. The cenotaph is still maintained and visible in a garden along the street Jean Chandos at a place called "Les Aubeniaux" (commune of Mazerolles (Vienne department). At the end of the 19th century, the local society of history moved it some metres away from the bank of the Vienne because of the river's recurrent flooding.

His death was mourned on both sides. In his book A Brief History of The Hundred Years' War, Desmond Seward states that Charles V of France ("Charles the Wise") is reported to have said that "had Chandos lived, he would have found a way of making a lasting peace". Froissart is more circumspect, but says that "I have heard him at the time regretted by renowned knights in France; for they said it was a great pity he was slain, and that, if he could have been taken prisoner, he was so wise and full of devices, he would have found some means of establishing a peace between France and England". He also stated of Chandos that "never since a hundred years did there exist among the English one more courteous, nor fuller of every virtue and good quality than him."

== Chandos Herald ==
John Chandos' herald, known as Chandos Herald, wrote a significant poem entitled, The Life of the Black Prince. The poem details many of the Prince's exploits in the Hundred Years' War, including the Castilian civil war, the battle of Crecy, and the battle of Poitiers (though these last two only briefly).

== Cultural influence ==
John Chandos is one of the characters in Arthur Conan Doyle's historical novel The White Company (1892) and in his later novel Sir Nigel.

He appears as a character in the Dragon Knight series of novels by Gordon R. Dickson as a protagonist of Baron Sir James Eckert.
