= Mazerolles, Vienne =

Mazerolles
- Commune
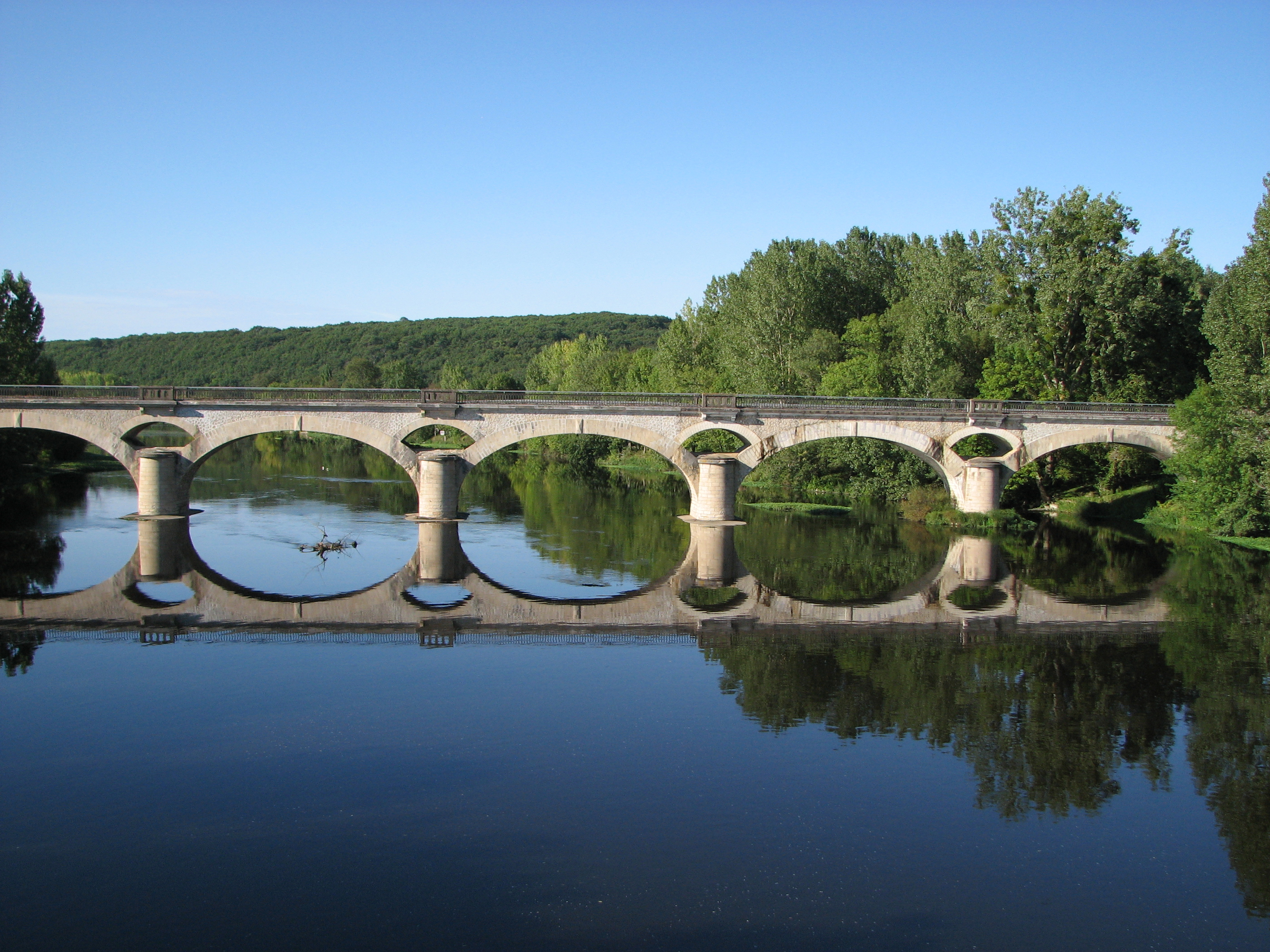
- The railway bridge over the Vienne river, in Mazerolles
- Location of Mazerolles
- Location within France Location within Nouvelle-Aquitaine
- Coordinates: 46°24′20″N 0°41′05″E
- Country: France
- Region: Nouvelle-Aquitaine
- Department: Vienne
- Arrondissement: Montmorillon
- Canton: Lussac-les-Châteaux
- Intercommunality: Vienne et Gartempe

Government
  - Mayor (2020–2026): Fabienne Maupin
- Area^{1}: 21.25 km^{2} (8.20 sq mi)
- Elevation: 80 m (260 ft)
- Highest elevation: 151 m (495 ft)
- Lowest elevation: 70 m (230 ft)
- Population (2023): 834
  - Density: 39.2/km^{2} (102/sq mi)
- Time zone: UTC+01:00 (CET)
  - Summer (DST): UTC+02:00 (CEST)
- INSEE/Postal code: 86153 /86320
- ^{1} French Land Register data, which excludes lakes, ponds, glaciers > 1 km^{2} (0.386 sq mi or 247 acres) and river estuaries.

Mazerolles (French pronunciation: [mazʁɔl]) is a commune in the Vienne department in the Nouvelle-Aquitaine region in western France.

== Geography ==
Located on the Vienne river which separates Mazerolles and Lussac-les-Châteaux, the village is 35 km south-east of Poitiers. It is made up of the village, and the localities "le Pont" and "Loubressac". It is located on the RN147 (axis Angers - Limoges), close to another major communication Highway A10 between Poitiers and Vivonne).

The sub-prefecture, Montmorillon is 14 km, Le Blanc (sub-prefecture of the Indre department is 40 km distant. Bellac in the Haute-Vienne department is 45 km. Large towns: Poitiers 35 km, Châtellerault 50 km, Limoges 90 km.

The town is close to the Parc naturel régional de la Brenne.

== History ==
Along the border of the river Vienne, a cenotaph of constable John Chandos was erected shortly after his death by the English authorities to commemorate the spot where he was killed by the spear of French knight Guillaume Boitel. The cenotaph is still maintained and visible in a garden along the street Jean Chandos at a place called "Les Aubeniaux" . At the end of the 19th century, the local society of history moved it from the banks of the Vienne because of recurrent flooding of this river.

== See also ==
- Communes of the Vienne department
