= Coliboaia Cave =

Cave and archaeological site in Romania

- Peștera Coliboaia
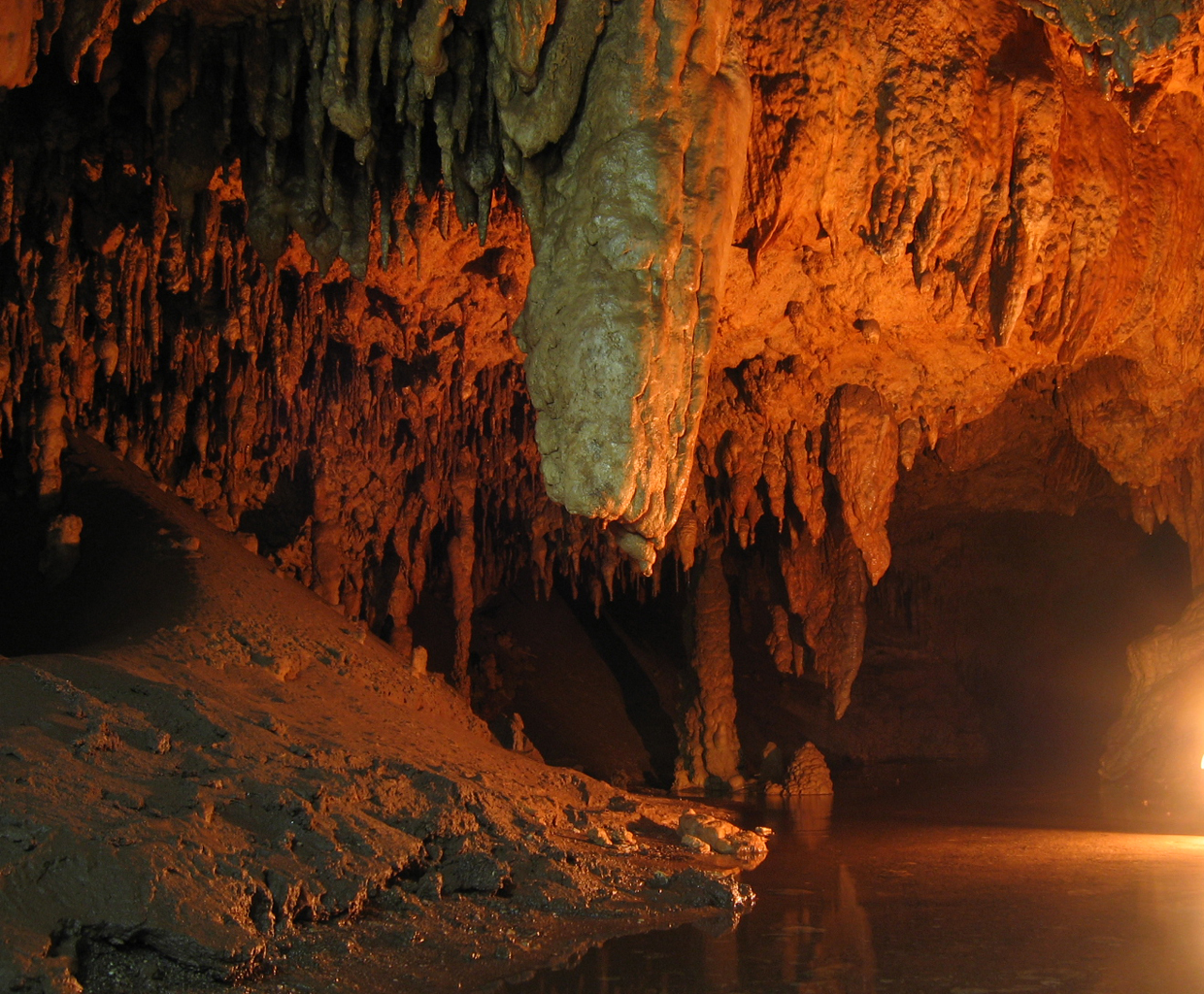
- Coliboaia Cave, Apuseni Mountains, Romania

- Location within Romania
- Location: Apuseni Natural Park, Bihor County, Romania
- Coordinates: 46°31′51″N 22°35′44″Eyes
- Depth: 560 m
- Length: 750 m
- Discovery: 1903
- Geology: Limestone
- Entrances: 1

Coliboaia Cave (Romanian: Peștera Coliboaia, pronounced [koliˈbo̯aja]) is in Apuseni Natural Park, Câmpani, Bihor County, Romania. It may contain the oldest known cave paintings of Central Europe, radiocarbon dated to 32,000 and 35,000 years BP, corresponding to the Aurignacian and Gravettian cultures of the Paleolithic period.

== Research history ==
The Coliboaia Cave was first mentioned in literature before 1900, but only in 1981 was it extensively investigated by Gabor Halasi. The cave was not widely known until September 2009, when prehistoric mural cave paintings were discovered. It was quickly put under protection by the Romanian Federation of Speleology.

== Drawings ==
The drawings in the Art Gallery are representations of animals, done in black and likely with charcoal. Some of the animals depicted include bison, bears, and rhinoceros, while the subject of other drawings remains unknown. The images are on both walls of the cave and do not appear to have any type of symmetrical pattern.

On the right wall, there is a drawing of a bison. The picture is 1.43 to 2.02 m (4.69 to 6.63 ft) above the ground and executed in bluish-gray lines. On the left side, an illustration of a rhinoceros head is 58 to 89 cm (22.8 to 35.0 in) above the floor. A consistent element to these drawings is that they only represent the heads of animals.

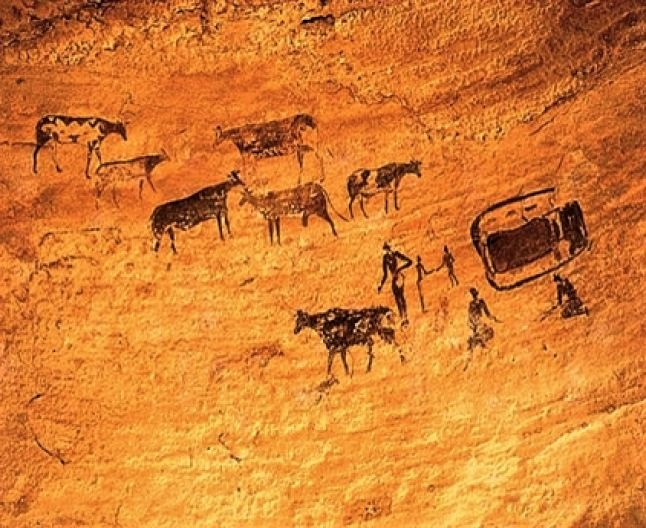
Rock art in Coliboaia Cave

=== Dating ===
The age of the pictures is being debated. Archaeologists’ estimates vary, but fall within the Middle Paleolithic, in between 35,000 and 23,000 BCE, which corresponds to the Aurignacian culture (35,000 to 29,000 years ago) and the Gravettian culture (29,000 to 22,000 years ago). However, the fact that cave bears and rhinos were scarce during those two time periods, makes this dating controversial. Furthermore, the drawings do not appear to be completely uniform. This suggests they were not all done at the same time.. A more recent paper makes a more accurate dating, using method _{14}C: 26,605 ÷ 36,324 cal. BP.

== See also ==
- Prehistoric Transylvania
- Chauvet Cave in southwestern France, where 35,000-year-old figures were drawn using a similar technique
