= Roc-aux-Sorciers =

Cave and archaeological site with prehistoric art in France

Roc-aux-Sorciers Cave
- Sorcerers' Rock
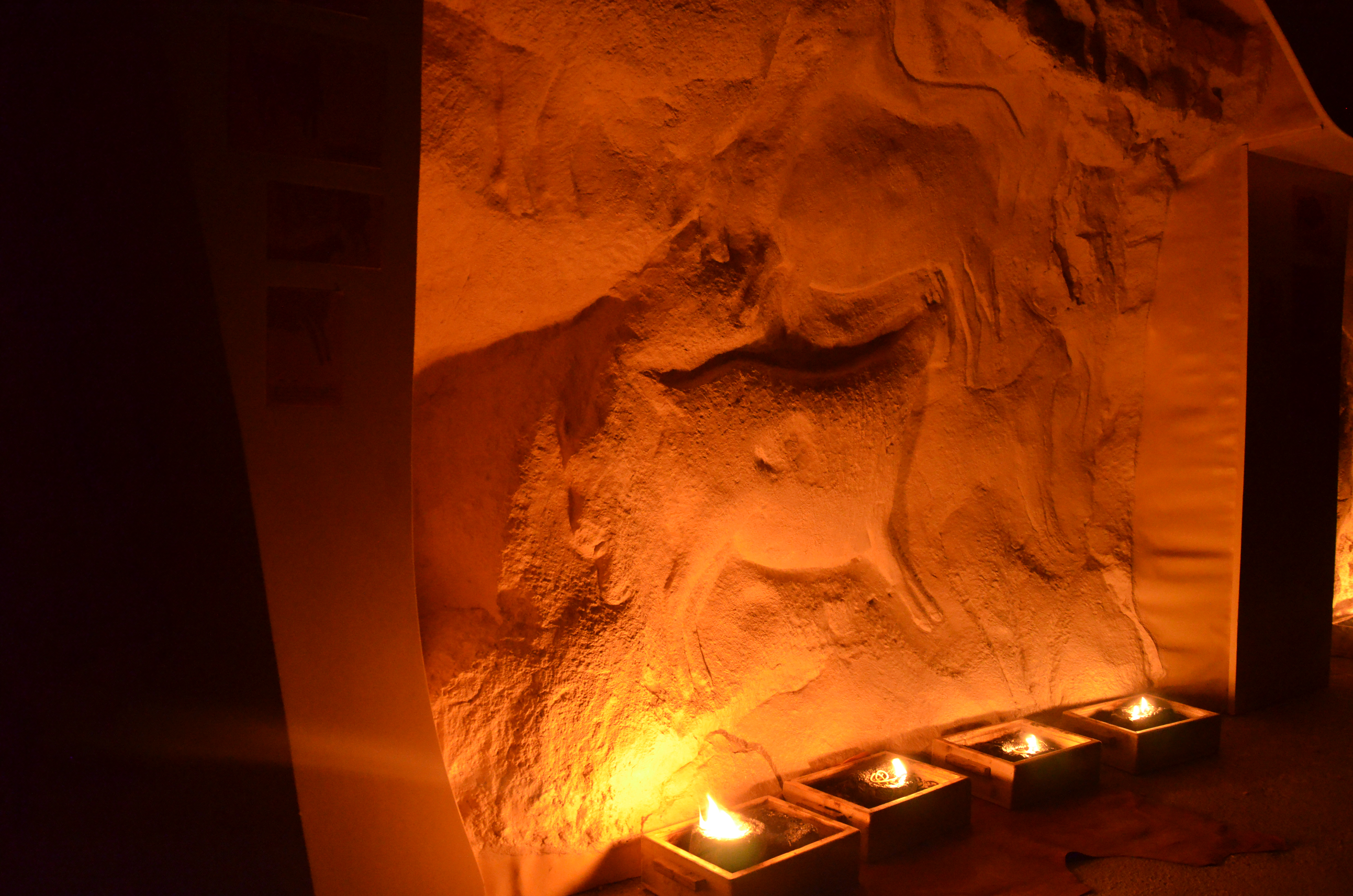
- Roc-aux-Sorciers

- location in Nouvelle-Aquitaine, France
- 46°25′17″N 1°31′27″E
- Periods: Upper Paleolithic
- Cultures: Magdalenian
- Location: Saint-Sebastien, Nouvelle-Aquitaine, France

History
- Built: c. 14,000 years ago
- Abandoned: c. 10,000 years ago

Site notes
- Excavation dates: 1933
- Archaeologists: Henri Breuil
- Discovered: 1927 by Lucien Rousseau

Roc-aux-Sorciers is an Upper Paleolithic rock shelter site dating to the mid-Magdalenian cultural stage, around 14,000 years ago, made famous by its relief wall carvings. The site is in the French commune of Angles-sur-l'Anglin, in Vienne. The name 'Sorcerers' Rock', with its suggestions of pagan rendez-vous, was applied to the site long before the wall-carvings were discovered.

The south-facing rock-shelter at the base of the slopes of the Douce, above the right bank of the Anglin, about 1.5 km (0.93 mi) above the village, is composed of two geologically distinct sections; below is the Abri Bourdois, a classic rock-shelter site beneath a slight overhang, and above is the Cave Taillebourg, a deeper vestibule. The two parts are separated by a zone that has not yet been excavated, kept in reserve. The site was classed a Monument Historique, 18 January 1955.

== The Site ==
The rockshelter is open on the south side, on the right bank of the river Anglin, at the base of the Douce cliffs. It is composed of two distinct geological parts:

- The lower Bourdois rockshelter which is a classic rockshelter with a low roof;
- The upper Taillebourg vault (previously Lucien Jacob vault), deeper and which is a typical vestibule type.

These two parts are actually separated by a non-excavated area, which is being conserved as an archeological reserve. The site is classed as an Historical Monument since the 18th of January 1955. The names of the ancient owners of the parcels, Madame Bourdois and Monsieur Taillebourg, were conserved by Suzanne de Saint-Mathurin as names of the dug sectors. These names are still used.

== Excavation history ==
The history of discoveries at Roc-aux-Sorciers begins in 1927, when Lucien Rousseau discovered the Paleolithic habitation and identified it as mid-Magdalenian in its culture. He began excavations in the Cave Taillebourg and recovered an engraved stone in which Henri Breuil detected the representation of a mammoth. Some years later, Suzanne de Saint-Mathurin became aware of Rousseau's article and decided to explore further, hoping to find some incised plaquettes like those from the cave at Lussac-les-Châteaux, also in Vienne. Assisted by her friend Dorothy Garrod, she carried out a decade of intensive campaigns between 1947 and 1957, and followed more sporadically until 1964. The team discovered carved blocks with sculpted and incised figures, sometimes painted, of bison, horses, wild goats, felines and the figure of a man. It soon became clear that these fragments had fallen from the roof of the Cave Taillebourg. Only the carved and painted figure of a bison (illustration, right above) has remained in place.

In all it appears that there were two phases of occupation at Roc-aux-Sorciers, the first from the Middle Magdelenian around 15,000 years ago which was sealed by the collapse of the rockshelter roof, and a second occupation from the Upper Magdelenianaround 12,000-10,000 years ago. The sculptures appear to be from the first occupation. As well as the wall art, traces of a domestic style occupation suggesting this was not a sanctuary.

The sculpted frieze was discovered in 1950. It is composed of bison, horses, wild goats, felines, and the headless and footless figures of women, of the type conventionally called Venuses.

== The sculpted frieze of the Abri Bourdois ==
The sculpted frieze is exceptional for the evidence it offers of the technical mastery of Magdalenian sculptors, for the anatomical details and the impression of power given to volumes in the play of firelight. Both animal and human figures strive for realism, a rarity in Paleolithic art that reinforces the unique value of the site.

The excavations brought to light the evidence of human occupation associated with this wall art, of a material culture represented in jewelry, lamps, and tools in flint, in bone and horn and in ivory. The frieze, some twenty metres in length, is an impressively monumental work of art. Numerous finely engraved figures show that graphic values could be expressed on an intimate scale as well.

== The Rockshelter today ==
After her death in 1991, Suzanne de Saint-Mathurin donated the site and her archives to the French state. Genevieve Pinçon continued excavations at the site as part of a multi-disciplinary team including Ludmila Iakovleva, the frieze was published in 1997.

A visitor centre has been built around the site in order to protect the friezes and present them to visitors.

== See also ==
- List of Stone Age art

== Notes ==
=== Bibliography ===
- Auzanne I., Desroches E. and Pinçon G., 2002, "Bilan d’interventions sur le site magdalénien du Roc-aux-Sorciers à Angles-sur-l’Anglin (86, France) : restauration, analyse de la polychromie et relevé numérique 3D", L’art avant l’Histoire, la conservation de l’art préhistorique, 10e journée d’études de la Section Française de l’Institut International de Conservation (SFIIC), Paris, 23-24 mai 2002, pp. 221–241, ill.
- Auzanne I. and Fuentes O., 2003, "Le 'sorcier' du Roc-aux-Sorciers à Angles-sur-l'Anglin (Vienne, France) : nouveaux éléments d'analyse", Antiquités Nationales, n° 35, pp. 41–54, ill.
- Iakovleva L. and Pinçon G., 1997, "La Frise sculptée du Roc-aux-Sorciers, Angles-sur-l'Anglin (Vienne)", Paris, CTHS/RMN, 168 p., ill.
- Iakovleva L. and Pinçon G., 1999, "L'art pariétal sculpté dans l'habitat du Roc-aux-Sorciers à Angles-sur-l'Anglin (Vienne, France)", L'Anthropologie, 103.4,:549-568 (abstract).
- Rousseau L., 1933, "Le Magdalénien dans la Vienne. Découverte et fouille d'un gisement du Magdalénien à Angles-sur-l'Anglin (Vienne)", Bulletin de la Société Préhistorique Française, n° 30, pp. 239–256, ill.
- Saint-Mathurin S. de, 1970, "À propos d’une pointe en os à base fourchue de l’abri du Roc-aux-Sorciers (Angles-sur-l’Anglin, Vienne)", Antiquités Nationales, n° 2, pp. 14–20, ill.
- Saint-Mathurin S. de, 1975, "Reliefs magdaléniens d'Angles-sur-l'Anglin (Vienne)", Antiquités Nationales, n° 7, pp. 24–31, ill.
- Saint-Mathurin S. de, 1978, "Les 'Vénus' pariétales et mobilières du Magdalénien d’Angles-sur-l’Anglin", Antiquités Nationales, n° 10, pp. 15–22, ill.
- Saint-Mathurin S. de, 1984, "L’abri du Roc-aux-Sorciers," L’Art des Cavernes. Atlas des grottes ornées paléolithiques françaises, (Paris, Ministère de la Culture), pp. 583–587, ill.
- Saint-Mathurin S. de and Garrod D., 1949, "Les fragments de bas-reliefs découverts dans le gisement magdalénien ancien d’Angles-sur-l’Anglin (Vienne)", C.-R. Académie des Inscriptions et Belles-Lettres, séance du 20 mai 1949, pp. 138–142, ill.
