= Lussac-les-Châteaux =

- Commune
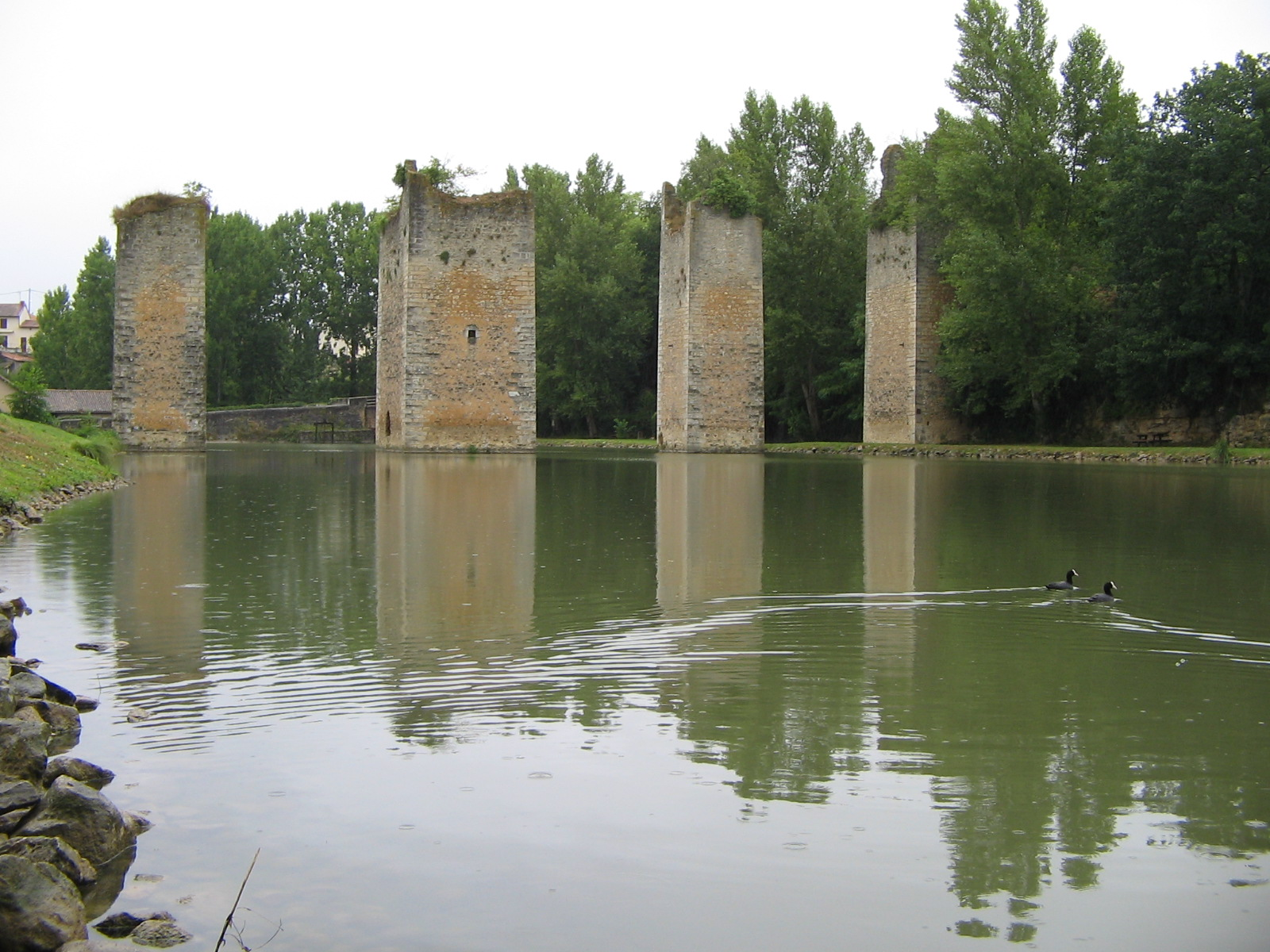
- The remains of the bridge of the Château de Lussac-Les-Châteaux

- Coat of arms
- Location of Lussac-les-Châteaux
- Location within France Location within Nouvelle-Aquitaine
- Coordinates: 46°24′13″N 0°43′39″E
- Country: France
- Region: Nouvelle-Aquitaine
- Department: Vienne
- Arrondissement: Montmorillon
- Canton: Lussac-les-Châteaux

Government
  - Mayor (2020–2026): Jean-Luc Madej
- Area^{1}: 28.06 km^{2} (10.83 sq mi)
- Elevation: 97 m (318 ft)
- Highest elevation: 148 m (486 ft)
- Lowest elevation: 70 m (230 ft)
- Population (2023): 2,263
  - Density: 80.65/km^{2} (208.9/sq mi)
- Time zone: UTC+01:00 (CET)
  - Summer (DST): UTC+02:00 (CEST)
- INSEE/Postal code: 86140 /86320
- ^{1} French Land Register data, which excludes lakes, ponds, glaciers > 1 km^{2} (0.386 sq mi or 247 acres) and river estuaries.

Lussac-les-Châteaux (French pronunciation: [lysak le ʃɑto]) is a commune in the Vienne department in the Nouvelle-Aquitaine region in western France.

== History ==
=== Prehistory ===
The importance of the prehistoric art at Lussac is evidenced by the presence of numerous archaeological artefacts in the Museum of National Antiquities at Saint-Germain-en-Laye.

The 'Cave of the Goblin' was excavated by A. Brouillet in 1865, by the Abbé Breuil in 1905, by Stéphane Lwoff in 1962, and from 1980 by Jean and André Chollet Airvaux. Among the items found by A. Brouillet were numerous engraved limestone slabs, a barbed arrow, a decorated awl, and a fragment of bone with a drawing of a horse and an ox.

This cave was occupied from the middle Magdalenian period, but the discovery of Roman tiles, coins, and a medieval seal shows it was a haven throughout history. 'The Hermitage,' a cave occupied by the Neanderthals, was excavated between 1864 and 1936 by A. Brouillet, the Abbé Breuil, Leon Pericard and Stéphane Lwoff. Thousands of tools were found there.

The cave of La Marche was excavated from 1937 onwards by Leon Pericard and Stéphane Lwoff. A major site in prehistoric times, it was visited by the Abbé Breuil on several occasions between 1939 and 1940. It was classified as a historic monument on 4 April 1970.

Researchers have discovered a quantity of drawings on limestone slabs, dating from the Magdalenian period 17,000 years ago. These sketches reflect the environment of prehistoric artists, representing various animals (mammoths, antelopes, cats, deer). In addition to drawings of animals, there are a series of human figures (something rare for this time), including the bodies of pregnant women and male faces. These prints are difficult to interpret, because the Magdalenian artists would cover old drawings with ochre, superimposing new drawings onto the same stone.

Some archaeologists have speculated that the picture tablets are evidence of a Palaeolithic 'school'. Above all, the pictures bear witness to Paleolithic life. Archaeologists note the graphic precision, direction of movement given to animals in very simple lines. Beyond their graphic quality, these prints may have been linked to sacred rites or mystery cults.

The limestone tablets found at Lussac became reference points for researchers on prehistory, and have the same importance as the cave paintings of Lascaux. Archaeologists also found thousands of tools in flint, bone, and reindeer ivory: chisels, scrapers, awls, needles, drilled sticks, and a spear with a reindeer ivory tip (basic single bevel and dual slot) called the 'spear of Lussac'. The local museum contains displays devoted to the cave.

The 'Guy Martin' network, discovered by cavers in 1990, is a cavern bristling with many stalactites. On one wall is engraved a 60 cm long mammoth and diverse representations. Bone fragments have been found. Like La Marche, this cave is dated to Magdalenian III (from about 14,000 years ago). The site was therefore already inhabited in the Magdalenian period 17,000 years ago as evidenced by the many slabs of carved limestone found in these caves.

Human occupation continued after the Palaeolithic. The dolmen of Loubressac attests to a human presence in the Neolithic. Between about 6000 and 4000 years ago, tribes scattered along the banks of the Vienne constructed megalithic tombs, of which little remains today. A stone capstone held up by upright stones formed a burial chamber, which was covered with a mound of soil. Were these the graves of chiefs or commoners? Various hypotheses have been advanced to explain these Neolithic monuments.

=== Gallo-Roman era ===
The district was originally 'Luciacum', the tribal domain of the Gallo-Roman chief 'Lucius'. The name became 'Luciago' and later 'Lussac'. Some artefacts of Gallo-Roman social and artistic life, such as pottery and coins, have been found. Local place names, such as 'Vaux villars', suggest that the occupants of Gallo-Roman villae worked in agriculture. A Gallo-Roman village at Civaux, few kilometres from Lussac, is well known from archaeology. By this period, the inhabitants were already using the river as a means of communication.

=== Middle Ages ===
Lussac, like many mediaeval towns, seems to have grown up around a castle built during the feudal era. The fragmentation of central power necessitated the establishment of fortresses, including on the provincial borders, to fight against land-hungry neighbouring warlords. The Lord of Lussac was a vassal of the Count de la Marche (Limousin) and had to defend this border area against Poitou.

According to tradition, the castle was built about 780. It is first referred to in the archives in 1065 as belonging to the Conis family of Saint-Germain.

In the next two centuries, the castle was held by two families. Sir John Chandos was appointed seneschal of Poitou in 1369 by the King of England, and settled in Poitiers. In the same year Sir John noticed, to his "annoyance!, that the French were regaining a foothold in the province. The Breton John Kerlouët and Louis de Saint Julien Trimouille, lord of Lusignan, had occupied La Roche-Posay and Saint-Savin, a few kilometres from Poitiers. Chandos decided to retake the abbey of Saint-Savin, with a surprise attack under cover of night.

The planned attack failed when, thinking they had been detected by the enemy, Chandos' force retreated towards the bridge across the Vienne at Lussac, along the route to Poitiers through Chauvigny. The French, unaware of their presence, had decided to follow the same route to harass any English troops. The adversaries met at the bridge of Lussac. In the battle, Chandos' long coat made him slip on the frost. James de St. Martin or Guillaume Boitel struck Chandos with his spear. Chandos' uncle Edward Twyford, standing over his wounded nephew, repulsed the attackers. One of his squires pierced both legs of the squire of James Saint-Martin with his lance; Saint-Martin died three days later at Poitiers. John Chandos was carried on a large shield to Morthemer, the nearest English fortress. He died on New Year's Day 1370, after a day and night of agony, at the age of 55.

When the news of Sir John's death reached the court of Edward III in England, and the court of Black Prince at Guyenne, they were greatly upset. Chandos was not only a great warrior, but also an able administrator and a wise politician.

A cenotaph was erected to commemorate the spot where he fell. This monument has since been moved to the nearby town of Mazerolles.

Bertrand du Guesclin recaptured the castle from the English in 1372.

=== Modern era ===
The large communal fish pond was dug in 1492. In 1519, Renée Geoffroy, heiress to the castle, married François de Rochechouart-Mortemart. At that time, the castle formed a large quadrangle with corner towers, battlements, and underground rooms. Its imposing mass loomed between the pond and the village.

The castle was sacked by the troops of the Admiral de Coligny in 1569, and then dismantled by the people, who used its stones to build houses. During the French Revolution, under a decree of the convention (Year II), the town was renamed Lussac-sur-Vienne. Fierce fighting took place between Resistance forces and the Wehrmacht in the summer of 1944.

== Population ==
Historical population
Year	Pop.	±% p.a.
1968	2,086	—
1975	2,201	+0.77%
1982	2,217	+0.10%
1990	2,297	+0.44%
1999	2,532	+1.09%
2007	2,360	−0.88%
2012	2,317	−0.37%
2017	2,318	+0.01%
2023	2,263	−0.40%
Source: INSEE

== Personalities ==
The area was the birthplace of the famous mistress to Louis XIV, Françoise-Athénaïs, marquise de Montespan (1640–1707).

== See also ==
- Communes of the Vienne department
