= Grotte de Cussac =

Cave and archaeological site in France

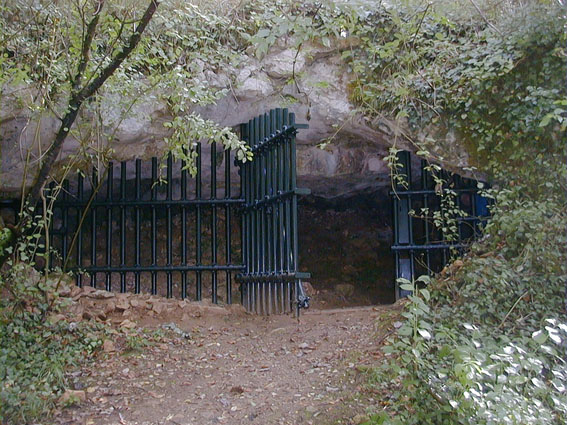
- Grotte de Cussac entry

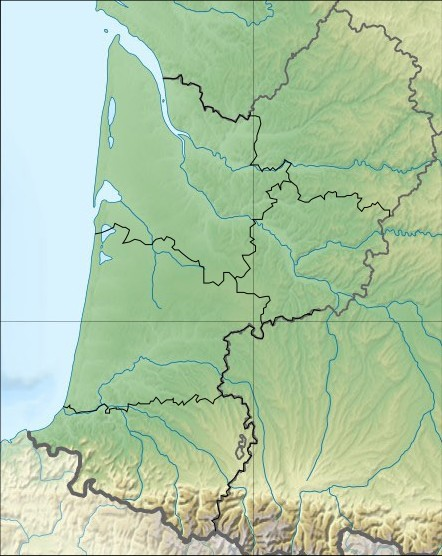
- Location in France Grotte de Cussac (France)
- 44°49′46″N 0°50′52″E
- Location: Le Buisson-de-Cadouin, Dordogne, Aquitaine, France

Site notes
- Excavation dates: Marc Delluc
- Public access: No

The Grotte de Cussac (French pronunciation: [ɡʁɔt də kysak]) is a cave located in the Dordogne river valley in Le Buisson-de-Cadouin, Dordogne, Aquitaine, France. It contains over 150 Paleolithic artworks, including engravings of bison, horses, mammoths, rhinoceroses, ibex, birds, enigmatic figures, and perhaps four female profiles, including one apparently notable for a rubenesque form common to pre-modern art. The cave's human remains, which include at least five individuals (four adults and a teenager), represent one of the few associations of parietal works and human burials in Paleolithic Europe. The bones have been dated using carbon-14 measurements to approximately 25,000 years in age. The cave was discovered on September 30, 2000, by amateur speleologist Marc Delluc and announced by the French Ministry of Culture on December 8, 2000. The cave is currently under protection for scientific study and is not open to the public. The cave's artworks, estimated to be 25,000 years old, are almost exclusively engravings, often very large, made with stone tools on the walls or with fingers on clay soil. Pigments are limited to very few red dots. The art is similar in theme and style to that found in the Quercy caves, particularly Pech Merle.
