= Robert William Kentridge =

British experimental psychologist (born 1960)

Professor Robert William Kentridge (born 1960) is a British experimental psychologist.

== Academic career ==
Robert Kentridge is Professor of Psychology at the University of Durham in the UK. His work is focussed on understanding the relationship between visual perception, visual attention, and consciousness. He has approached these questions by studying neurological patients, by systematically assessing visual abilities using psychophysical methods, using neuroimaging, and, more recently, using virtual reality. His work on attention and consciousness has had notable influence on philosophical views about the basis of consciousness.

In 1984, Kentridge began studying for a PhD at the University of Durham on the role of the neurotransmitter dopamine in neural basis of reinforcement in rats, under the supervision of Professor John Patrick Aggleton. Kentridge obtained his PhD in 1988, and then took up a post-doctoral position with Professor Aggleton, examining the role of the amygdala in memory.

Having become allergic to rats, Kentridge changed direction and began studying early processes in visual attention and eye movements with Professor John Findlay, also in Durham. His expertise in computer programming gaze-contingent eye movement experiments led to a collaboration with Professor Charles A. Heywood and Professor Lawrence Weiskrantz in neuropsychological research that has continued to this day. Since the late 1980s, Kentridge's research has concentrated on the neuropsychology of visual perception and attention, and on the perception of the surface properties of objects. Kentridge has written over 100 academic publications.

In 1999, Kentridge and his collaborators, Heywood and Weiskrantz, were the first to demonstrate that a patient with the neurological condition blindsight was capable of directing his attention to stimuli that he could not see. Despite the fact that attention selectively enhanced the processing of these stimuli, the fact that the blindsight patient still did not see them showed that visual attention and visual consciousness were distinct and separate processes. Subsequently, Kentridge, Nijboer and Heywood showed that the same was true of neurologically normal people.

Kentridge has also conducted research into the neural bases of colour vision through the study of patients with cerebral achromatopsia. He has shown that such patients, despite having no conscious experience of colour, extract colour contrast signals from visual information originating in the retina. Kentridge, Heywood and Weiskrantz have furthermore shown that a patient with an extensive lesion to their striate cortex does not even extract contrast signals and responds behaviourally only to the wavelength of light. This shows that it is only the very final stage of the transformation of retinal signals into estimates of the surface property of colour that gives rise to conscious experience.

Kentridge has used a variety of techniques to further understanding of the specialisation of brain areas for analysis of distinct visually defined properties of objects. In collaboration with David Milner, one of the authors of the influential two visual stream hypothesis https://en.wikipedia.org/wiki/Two-streams_hypothesis and colleagues he used both functional neuroimaging and analysis of the abilities of brain neurological patients with localised damage to the cortex to distinguish the brain areas involved in the perception of colour, shape, texture and glossiness. He has published serious scientific papers which, nevertheless, have a humorous side. A paper investigating the psychological constructs people use in perceiving translucent materials examined peoples judgements of the strength and milkiness of cups of tea. A paper examining the hypothesis that left=handedness might be associated with asymmetric neurological damage, and hence early death, was published in the Christmas issue of the British Medical Journal as it statistically examined causes of death of bowlers in that quintessentially English game, cricket.

Kentridge has been involved in a number of interdisciplinary projects. He is assistant director of the Durham Centre for Visual Arts and Culture at the University of Durham. He has long-standing links with philosophers of mind studying the relationship between attention and consciousness and has been an invited speaker in both psychology and philosophy programmes of the European Society for Philosophy and Psychology and the Southern Society for Philosophy and Psychology and at the annual Rudolf Carnap lectures in Bochum. He is currently collaborating with archaeologists the UK and Germany studying the influence of visual factors in Palaeolithic art.

Kentridge is a member of a number of academic societies, including the International Neuropsychological Symposium. He is a Fellow of the Canadian Institute for Advanced Research in their programme on Brain, Mind, and Consciousness.

== Family ==
He is a nephew of the prominent English barrister Sir Sydney Kentridge, and a cousin of the South African artist William Kentridge.
