= Guillaume Boitel =

14th century French knight

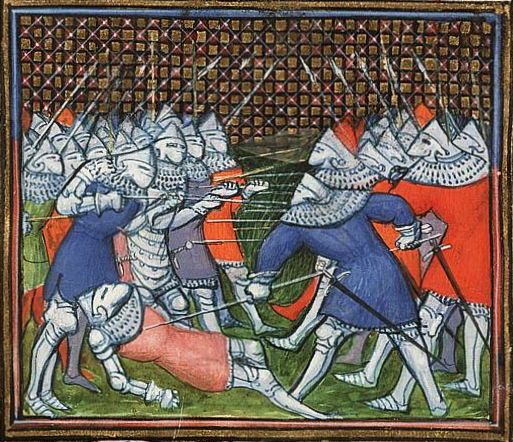
The death of Sir John Chandos at Lussac Place of origin, Paris, Virgil Master (illuminator); c. 1410

Guillaume Boitel, was a knight and the faithful companion of the French knight Bertrand Du Guesclin. He was originally sent by king Charles V of France to assist Du Guesclin during the Anglo-French war in Normandy and the Breton War of Succession between Charles de Blois and Jean de Montfort (1363–1364).

He followed Du Guesclin as his vanguard chief in Spain, helping Henry II of Castile against his half-brother Peter of Castile, with Breton, French and English warlords such as Hugh Calveley. He conquered Magallón and Briviesca.

He was one of the French chiefs during the Battle of Montiel. In 1369, after the Spanish civil war, he returned to France some months before Du Guesclin, appointed as constable of France in March 1370, for new fights against the troops of king Edward III of England.
