= Last Glacial Maximum refugia =

Places of survival during glaciation

The Last Glacial Maximum map with vegetation types.

Last Glacial Maximum refugia were places (refugia) in which humans and other species survived during the Last Glacial Period, around 25,000 to 18,000 years ago. Glacial refugia are areas where climate changes were not as severe, and where species could recolonize after deglaciation.

Globally, the temperatures during the Last Glacial Maximum (LGM) were 4.0 ± 0.8 °C cooler than present day. The colder climate contributed to ice sheet growth in North America, Europe, and Antarctica. At this time there were further major climate shifts around the world. Some areas became too dry to support much life; others housed more vegetation and animals.

The northern hemisphere was heavily impacted by ice sheets during the LGM. Some recent archaeological evidence suggests the possibility that human arrival in the Americas may have occurred prior to the Last Glacial Maximum more than 30,000 years ago. This evidence was found adjacent to ice sheets, but research is still in an early stage. The best attested shelters are therefore mainly those in Eurasia. Aside from human habitation in the north, other animals and vegetation thrived in refugia south of ice sheets.

The southern hemisphere saw much less extensive glaciation, and outside Antarctica lacked continental ice sheet growth. Vast areas of Australia and Africa were too dry for human habitation of any sort, even by the most specialized and well-adapted foragers. However, Sub-Saharan Africa was a refuge for many humans. South America was not inhabited by humans during the LGM, but many other animals existed and thrived there.

== Northern Hemisphere ==
=== North America ===
The Laurentide and Cordilleran ice sheets at their maximum extent during the Last Glacial Maximum.

The Laurentide and Cordilleran ice sheets overtook the majority of Canada and parts of the United States during the last glaciation. South of the glaciers, the major biomes on the continent were tropical semi-desert, subalpine parkland, temperate steppe grassland, and main taiga. In the present day climate, the biomes in North America are tundra, boreal forest, temperate forest, grassland, desert and several more. As the ice sheets retreated, biomes moved northward.

During the LGM, beech and maple trees were found in temperate deciduous forests in the southeast United States. These areas were a refuge to many species. As the glacier retreated, trees and other vegetation migrated north to follow the climatic conditions they required.

The first humans were thought to have arrived in North America around 30,000 years ago from Beringia. Homo sapiens were discovered in the high latitude northern hemisphere 30,000 years ago; however, they did not migrate south until almost 15,000 years ago.

=== Europe ===
The majority of the regions north of 40° N were overtaken by glaciers during the LGM. In these areas the climate was 10–25 °C lower than the current temperatures. South of the glaciers housed a steppe-tundra climate, along with small sections of forest steppe and open boreal woodlands. In these lowland areas the temperature was more mild, 2–5 °C less than the present day. In the present, Europe has several biomes such as the Mediterranean, temperate forests, boreal forests and several steppes.

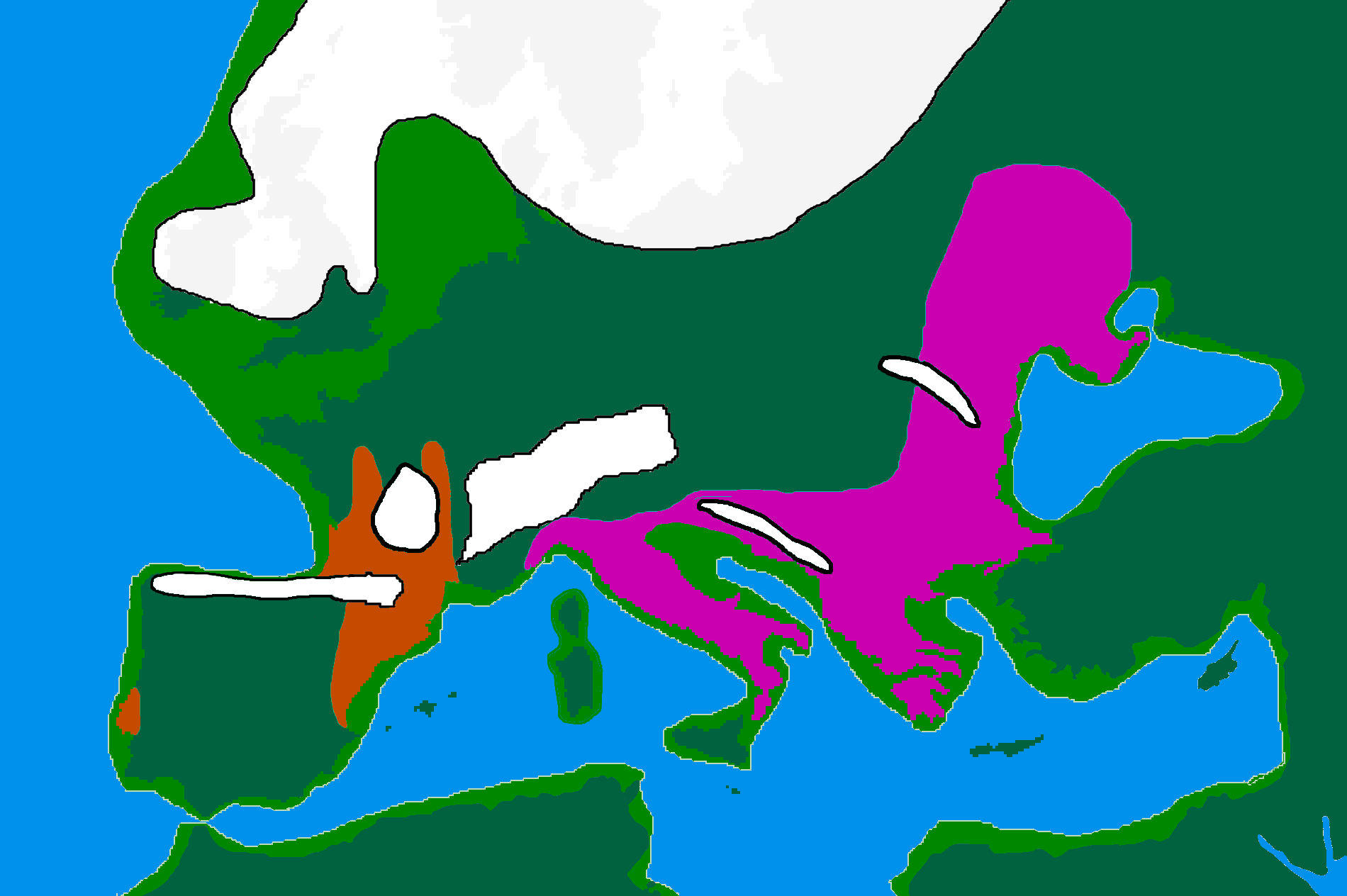
European LGM refuges, 20 kya. Solutrean and Proto-Solutrean cultures Epi-Gravettian culture

Due to the harsh conditions in Europe during the LGM, humans remained in certain regions. The Solutrean and Proto Solutrean cultures are found west of the Alps. The Solutrean people lived between a forest steppe and a steppe tundra. This area had the highest probability of containing human refugia during the LGM. Parts of Italy and extending into Romania contained the Epi-Gravettian cultures. About 5,000–130,000 people lived in Europe during the LGM.

Most trees in Europe lived in select refugia. Several requirements of these refugia include: soil moisture, relatively warm temperatures, shelter from wind, and no permafrost. There are two proposed hypotheses for tree refugia during the LGM in Europe. The first pertains to trees thriving in high-altitude locations in southern Europe. The second hypothesis suggests that forest trees existed only in small scattered refugia where there was adequate moisture.

=== Asia ===
In Asia the main biomes during the LGM were forest steppes, semi-arid temperate woodlands, scrub woodlands, and tropical woodlands. There were some deserts in the region as well; 75% of the area consisted of dry steppes, semi-deserts, and deserts. The remaining areas in Asia were covered with tropical rainforests.

There were several factors that controlled where plants and animals thrived in Asia during the LGM. In the south, many areas were too dry. In higher latitudes, many areas were too cold. Climate conditions in central Asia were generally too harsh to allow human habitation, although some hominin sites in Uzbekistan probably date to periods of glacial maxima.

=== Northern Africa ===
The climate was drastically different between Northern Africa and Southern Africa. In the north, Africa was mainly a tropical extreme desert, but also housed small sections of tropical semi-desert, tropical grassland and tropical woodland.

The Sahara desert, in Northern Africa, during the LGM moved slightly south due to the ice sheets in the north. When that occurred, the northern tip of Africa became a haven for humid and moist mixed forests. These climatic conditions were similar to southern Europe, now called the Mediterranean. During the LGM, winter global temperatures were 10-20 °C cooler. Even with the cold, the Mediterranean housed a mosaic of suitable micro climates for temperate and thermophilic animals. Many animals that moved to this area would have died from the cold tundra during the LGM.

== Southern Hemisphere ==
=== Southern Africa ===
The Congo tropical rainforest resides in the southern region of Africa. During the Last Glacial Maximum, the rainforest was not as large as it is today. This was because the Earth was drier. With less humidity, the Congo shrank by 54%. In addition, the LGM allowed for savannas, tropical grasslands, tropical thorn scrub, tropical semi-desert, tropical extreme desert, and semi-arid temperate woodland. Today, Southern Africa consists mainly of savannas, deciduous woodlands, tropical rainforests, and deserts.

Modern humans evolved from Africa, with their first known appearance being ~195,000 years ago. The earliest dated fossils outside of Africa are between 90,000 and 120,000 years ago. During the LGM, 27-66% of Africa was a refugium for humans. Humans thrived here because of the abundance of humidity, accessibility of woodlands, and lastly precipitation/access to water. The Zambezi, Omo river, and the Great Rift Valley lakes were major sources of water in southern Africa.

=== South America ===
South America contained several biomes during the LGM. First, the Andes mountains held glaciers which created a tundra in surrounding areas. Secondly, the Amazon rainforest contained tropical rainforests, grasslands, deserts, and savannas. The ITCZ, trade winds, and insolation created an environment that allowed high precipitation rates in the Amazon. South of the remaining Amazon rainforest, the climate was significantly drier. For example, precipitation east of the Andes was ~20–30% lower than present day values. Additionally, the southern tip of the continent had ~40–50% lower precipitation.

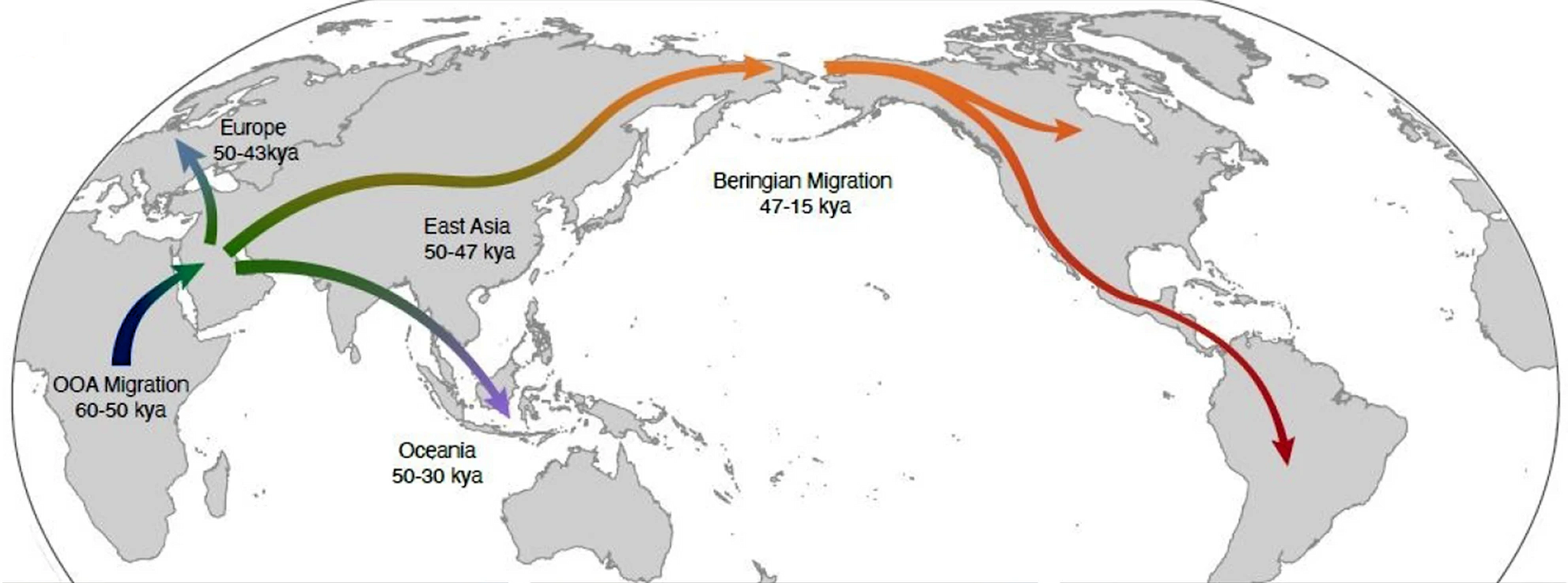
A map of human dispersal around the Earth.

Humans arrived in South America approximately 15,000 years ago. Humans arrived after the LGM.

The South American deer, Hippocamelus, was known to live in high altitude locations and cold valleys. In the Pleistocene, they lived anywhere between 36.5° S and 54° S. Presently, they live between 40° S and 51° S. The habitat of Hippocamelus shrank as the LGM came to an end. The change in location is theorized to be caused by a lack of cold tundra areas, as well as higher sea level.

=== Australia ===
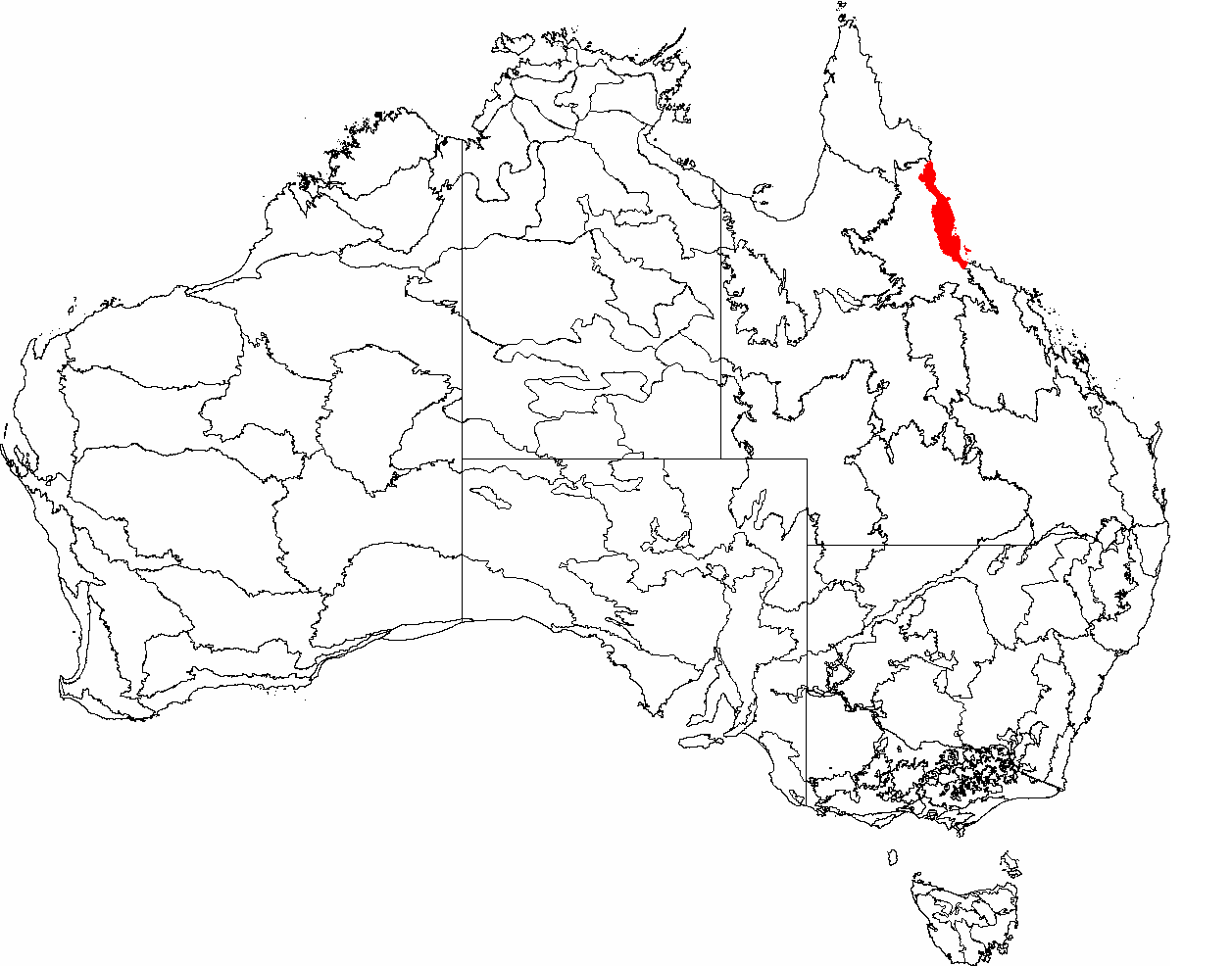
Australian Wet Tropics shown in red.

During the Last Glacial Maximum, Australia was cooled and became arid. The annual temperatures decreased approximately 10 °C, and rainfall decreased 60%. Australian biomes during the LGM include tropical extreme desert, tropical semi-desert, tropical thorn scrub and scrub woodland, tropical grassland, and tropical woodland. The largest biome was the tropical extreme desert. This region was considered a "barrier", meaning devoid of human activity. Australia housed refugia such as the Gulf Plans/Einasleigh Uplands, Brigalow Belt South, Murray Darling Depression, Tasmanian Central Highlands, and many others.

The majority of refugia existed along the coast where woodlands and grasslands were found. The Australian Wet Tropics are a region in the northeast that contain rainforests. The rain forest expanded and contracted throughout the glacial cycles. During the LGM, it withdrew to a refugium near the coast. A majority of the wet tropics were replaced with woodlands and grasslands after the LGM.

== See also ==
- Glacial relict
- Magdalenian
- Upper Paleolithic
- Gravettian
- Pavlovian culture
- Franco-Cantabrian region
- Würm glaciation
- Ibero-Maurusian
- Capsian culture
- Kebaran culture
