= Epigravettian =

European Upper Paleolithic culture

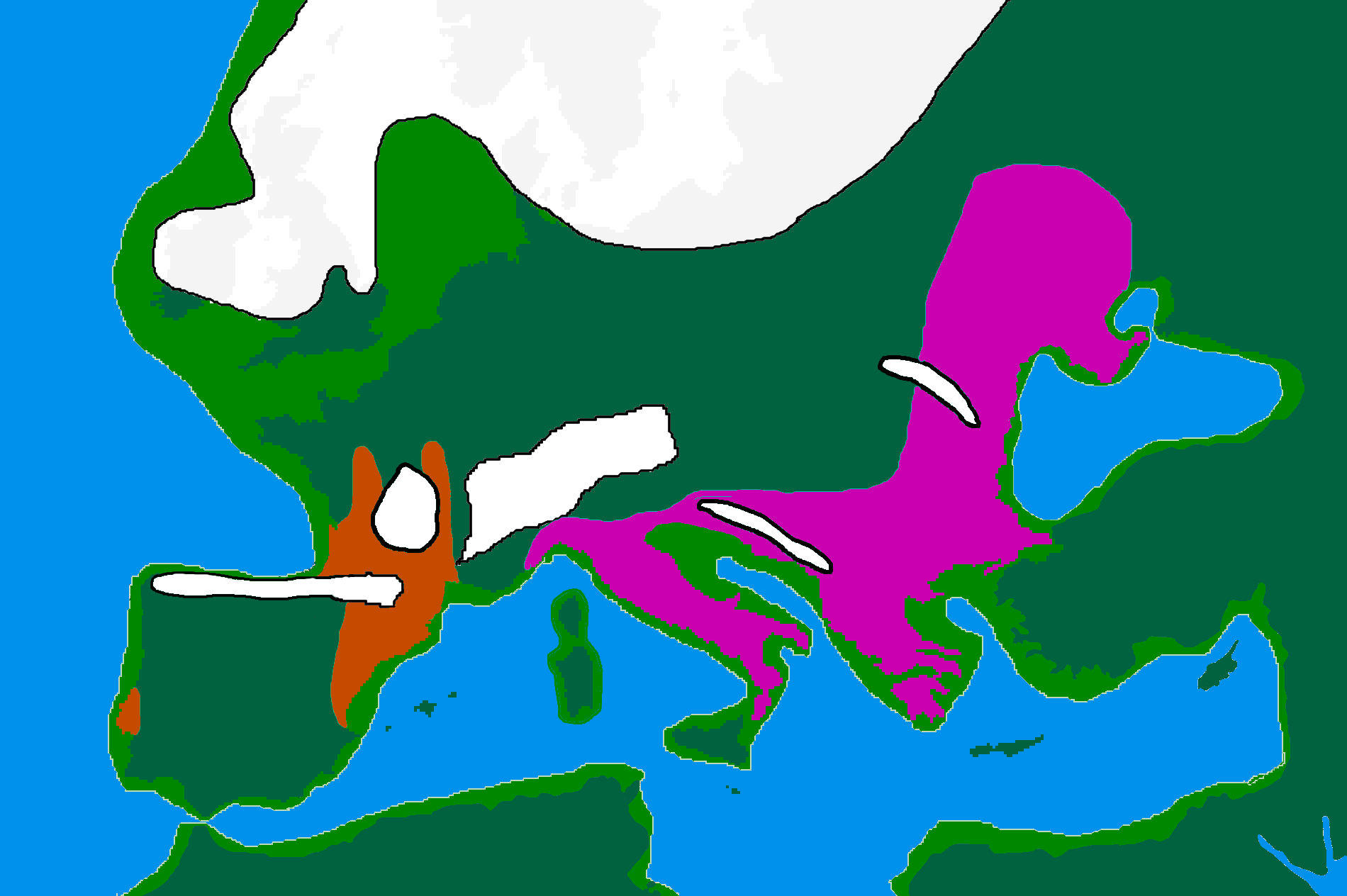
- European Last Glacial Maximum refugia, c. 20,000 BP; Solutrean Epigravettian
- Alternative names: Tardigravettian
- Geographical range: Southern and Eastern Europe
- Period: Late Upper Paleolithic
- Dates: ~21,000 – 10,000 cal. BP
- Type site: None (because likely a continuation of the Gravettian)
- Major sites: Paglicci, Arene Candide, Riparo Tagliente, Dolní Věstonice
- Preceded by: Gravettian
- Followed by: Magdalenian, Mesolithic cultures
- Defined by: Georges Laplace, 1958 (broader-than-modern meaning) Broglio, Laplace et al., 1963 (modern meaning, as "Tardigravettiano")

The Epigravettian (Greek: epi "above, on top of", and Gravettian) was one of the last archaeological industries and cultures of the European Upper Paleolithic. It emerged after the Last Glacial Maximum around ~21,000 cal. BP or 19,050 BC. It succeeds the Gravettian culture in Italy. Initially named Tardigravettian (Late Gravettian) in 1964 by Georges Laplace in reference to several lithic industries found in Italy, it was later renamed in order to better emphasize its independent character.

Three subphases, the Early Epigravettian (20,000 to 16,000 BP), the Evolved Epigravettian (16,000 to 14,000 BP) and the Final Epigravettian (14,000 to 8,000 BP), have been established, that were further subdivided and reclassified. In this sense, the Epigravettian is simply the Gravettian after ~21,000 BP, when the Solutrean had replaced the Gravettian in most of France and Spain.

Several Epigravettian cultural centers have developed contemporaneously after 22,000 years BP in Europe. These range across southern, central and most of eastern Europe, including southwestern France, Italy, Southeast Europe, the Caucasus, Ukraine and Western Russia to the banks of the Volga River.

Its lithic complex was first documented at numerous sites in Italy. Great geographical and local variability of the facies is present, however all sites are characterized by the predominance of microliths, such as backed blades, backed points, and bladelets with retouched end.

The Epigravettian is the last stage of the Upper Paleolithic succeeded by Mesolithic cultures after 10,000 BP.

In a genetic study published in Nature in May 2016, the remains of an Epigravettian male from Ripari Villabruna in Italy were examined. He carried the paternal haplogroup R1b1 and the maternal haplogroup U5b. An Epigravettian from the Satsurblia Cave in Georgia, who was examined in a previous study, has been found to be carrying the paternal haplogroup J1 and the maternal haplogroup K3.

An analysis of Epigravettian producing individuals in Italy indicates that they were not closely related to earlier Gravettian-producing inhabitants of the peninsula, and instead belong to the Villabruna genetic cluster. This group is more closely related to ancient and modern peoples in the Middle East and the Caucasus than earlier European Cro-Magnons. Epigravettian peoples belonging to the Western Hunter Gatherer genetic cluster expanded across Western Europe at the end of the Pleistocene, largely replacing the producers of the Magdalenian culture that previously dominated the region.

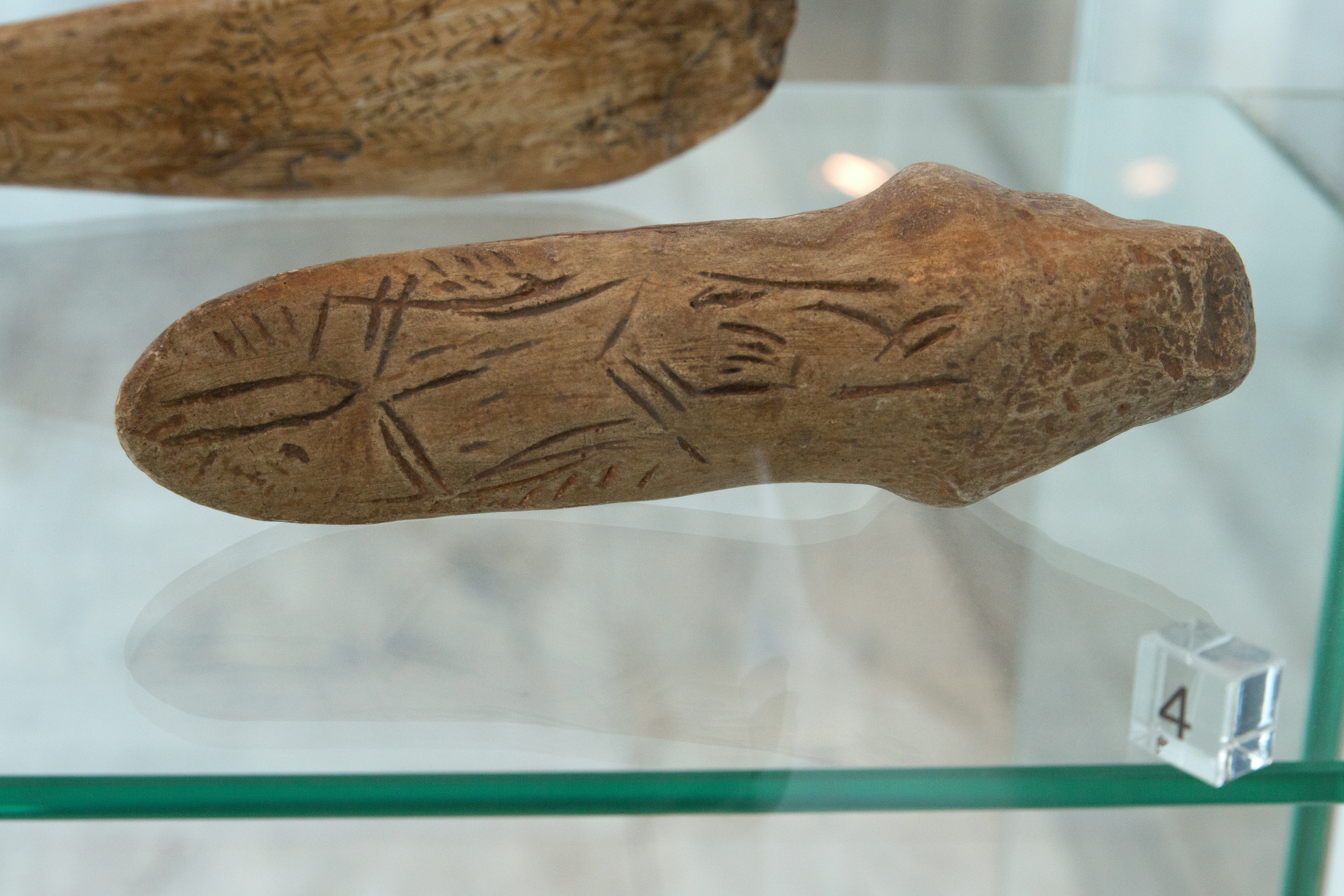
Epigravettian artefact, extremely stylized sculpture, Anthropos, Brno.

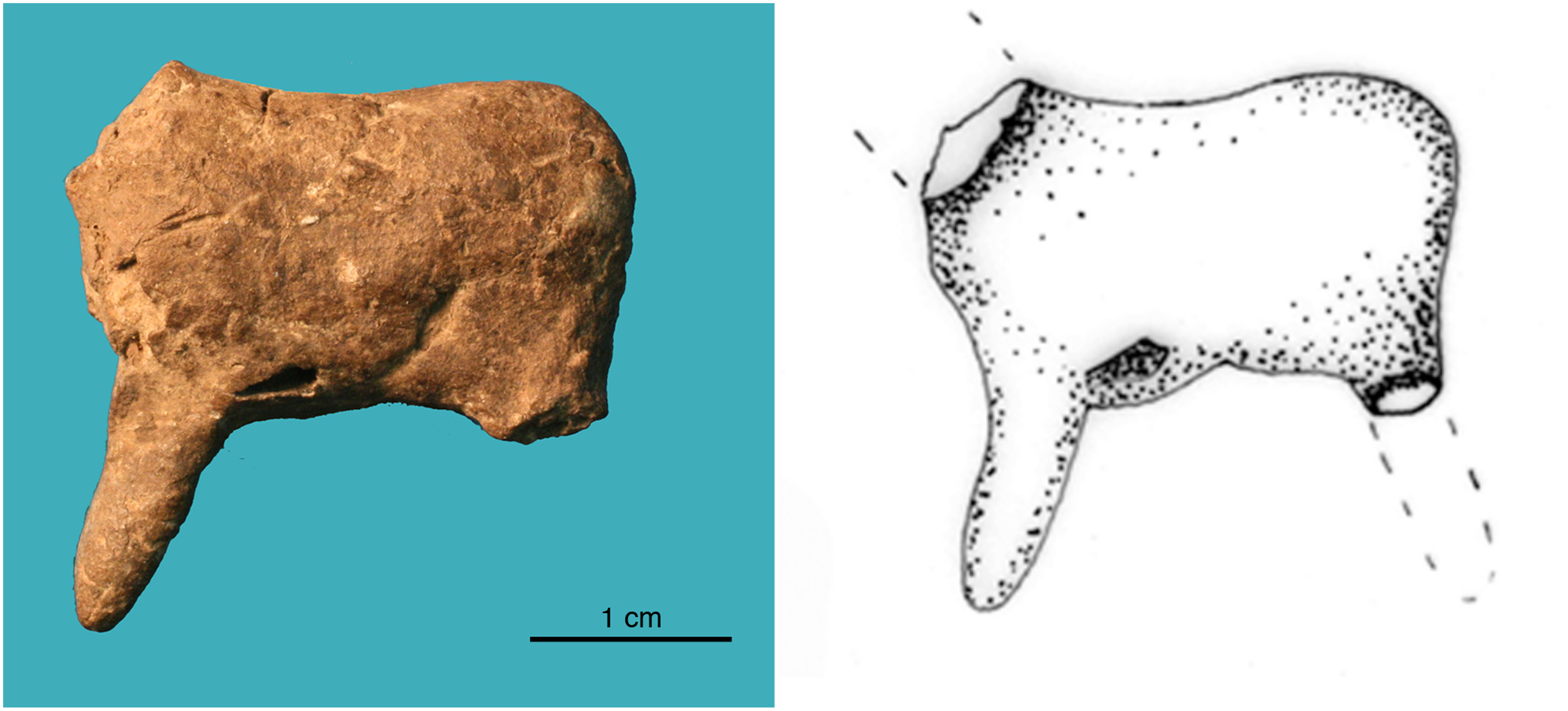
Epigravettian ceramic figurine of a horse or deer, Vela Spila, Croatia, dated to 15,400-14,600 BP.

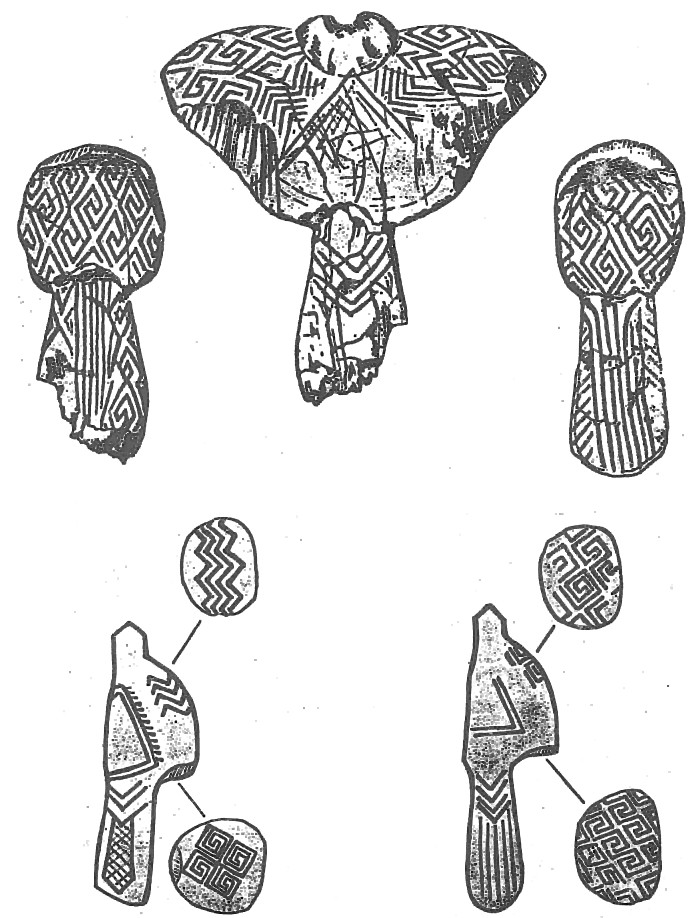
Engraved figurine from Mezine, Ukraine

== See also ==
- Mezine
- Eastern hunter-gatherer
- Anatolian hunter-gatherers
- Caucasus hunter-gatherer
- Western Hunter-Gatherer
- Early European modern humans
- Younger Dryas

== Sources ==
- Fu, Qiaomei (2 May 2016). "The genetic history of Ice Age Europe". Nature. 534 (7606). Nature Research: 200–205. Bibcode:2016Natur.534..200F. doi:10.1038/nature17993. PMC 4943878. PMID 27135931.
