= Bayac =

- Commune
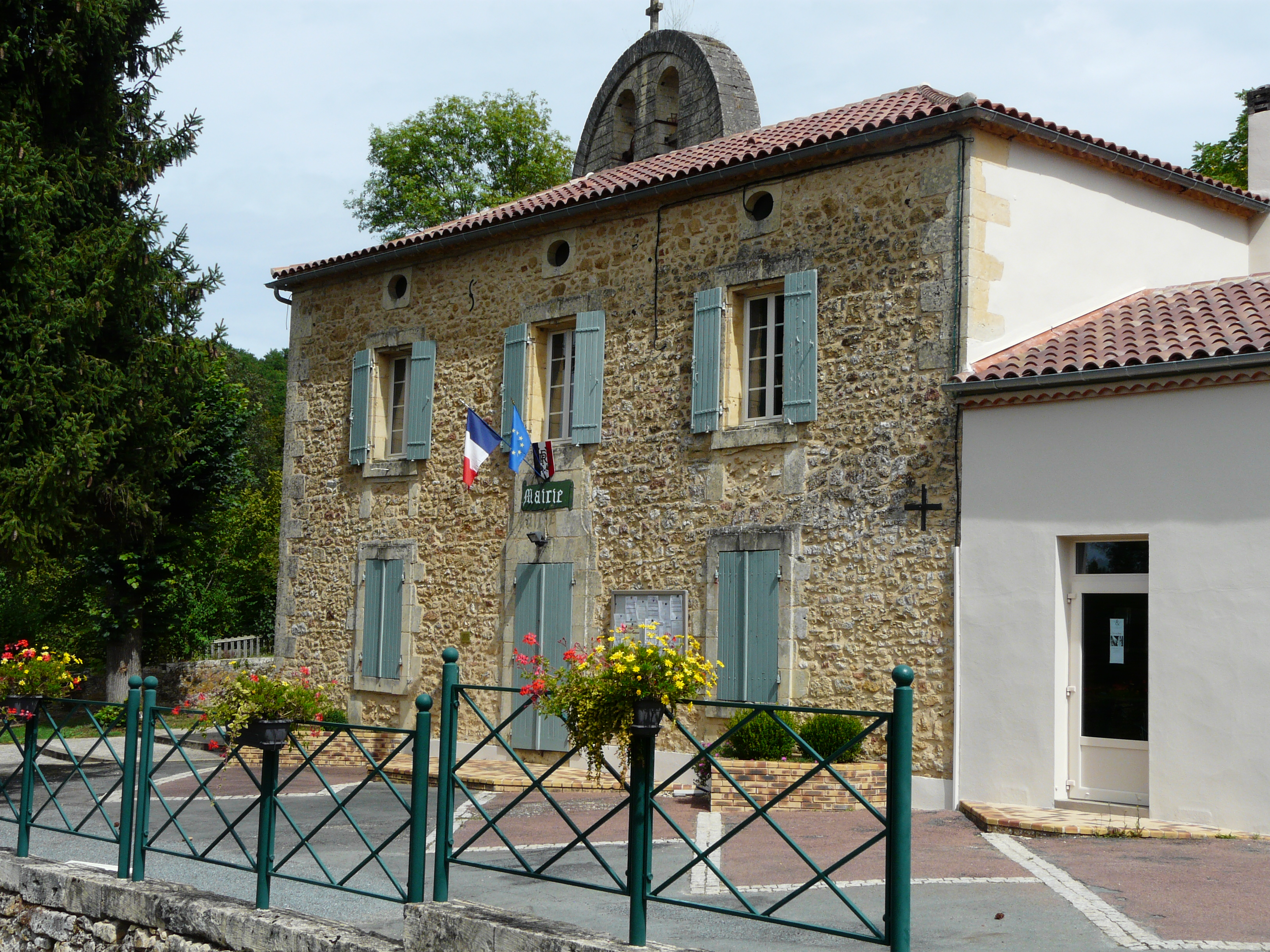
- The town hall in Bayac
- Location of Bayac
- Location within France Location within Nouvelle-Aquitaine
- Coordinates: 44°48′16″N 0°43′37″E
- Country: France
- Region: Nouvelle-Aquitaine
- Department: Dordogne
- Arrondissement: Bergerac
- Canton: Lalinde

Government
  - Mayor (2020–2026): Annick Carot
- Area^{1}: 10.23 km^{2} (3.95 sq mi)
- Elevation: 53 m (174 ft)
- Highest elevation: 173 m (568 ft)
- Lowest elevation: 42 m (138 ft)
- Population (2023): 355
  - Density: 34.7/km^{2} (89.9/sq mi)
- Time zone: UTC+01:00 (CET)
  - Summer (DST): UTC+02:00 (CEST)
- INSEE/Postal code: 24027 /24150
- ^{1} French Land Register data, which excludes lakes, ponds, glaciers > 1 km^{2} (0.386 sq mi or 247 acres) and river estuaries.

Bayac (French pronunciation: [bajak]; Occitan: Baiac) is a commune in the Dordogne department in southwestern France.

== Population ==
Historical population
Year	Pop.	±% p.a.
1968	348	—
1975	308	−1.73%
1982	304	−0.19%
1990	328	+0.95%
1999	326	−0.07%
2007	376	+1.80%
2012	350	−1.42%
2017	351	+0.06%
2023	355	+0.19%
Source: INSEE

== See also ==
- Communes of the Dordogne department
- Château de Bayac
- Gravettian, archaeological industry of the European Upper Paleolithic; the type-site, La Gravette, is near Bayac
