= Château de Bayac =

Château in Bayac, Dordogne, France

Coordinates: 44°48′14″N 0°43′44″E

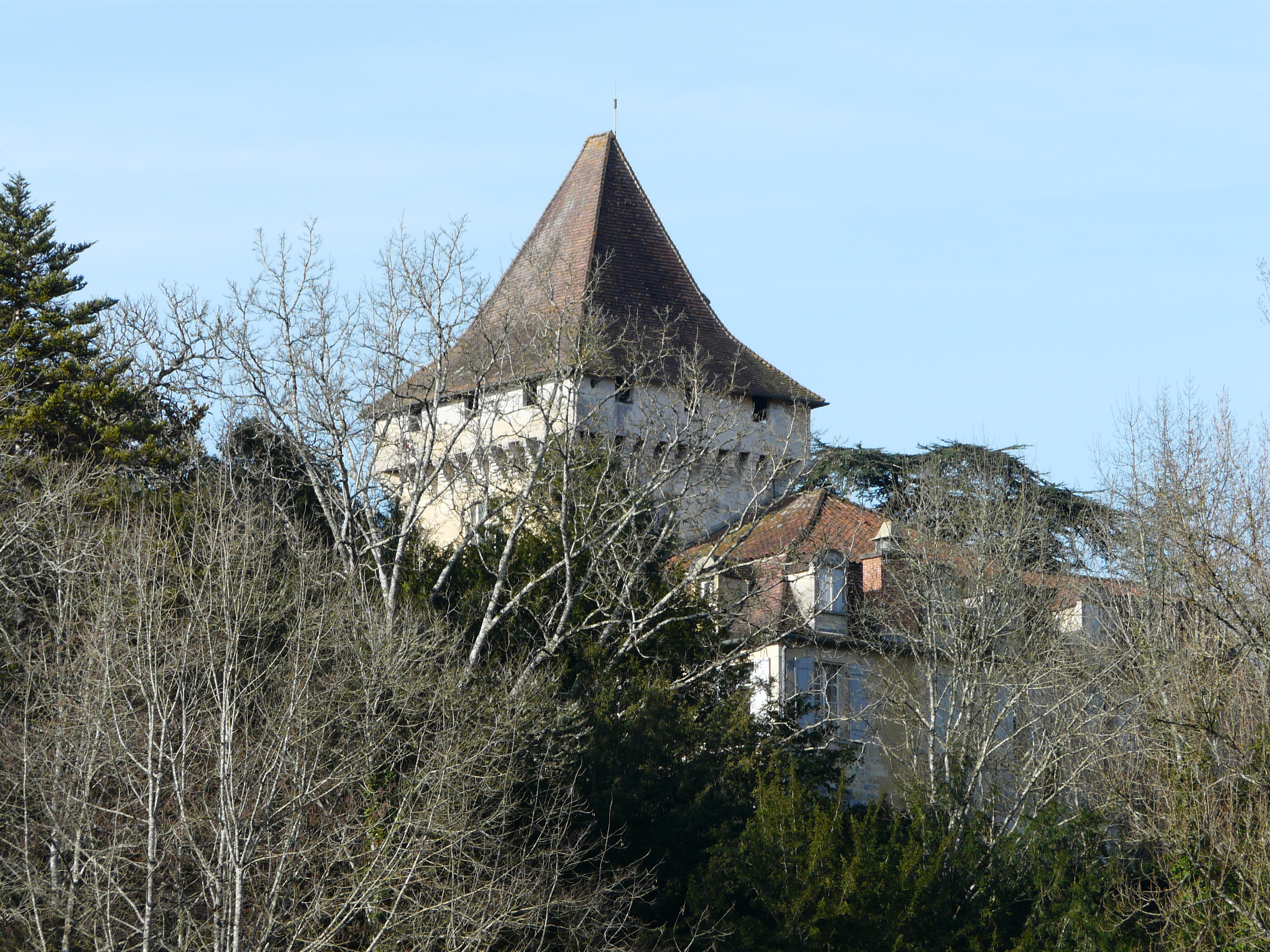
Bayac Castle, Dordogne, France.

The Château de Bayac is a château in Bayac, Dordogne, Nouvelle-Aquitaine, France.
