= Pavlovian culture =

Upper Paleolithic culture

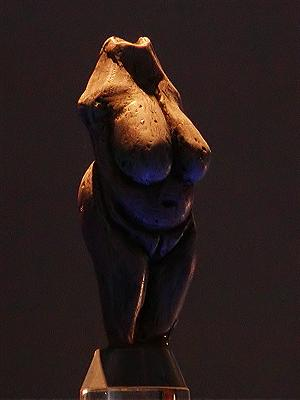
- Horizon: Gravettian
- Geographical range: Central Europe
- Period: Initial Upper Paleolithic
- Dates: c. 27,000 BC – c. 23,000 BC
- Preceded by: Aurignacian
- Followed by: Solutrean

The Pavlovian is an Upper Paleolithic culture, a variant of the Gravettian, that existed in the region of Moravia, northern Austria and southern Poland around 29,000–25,000 years BP. The culture used sophisticated stone age technology to survive in the tundra on the fringe of the ice sheets around the Last Glacial Maximum. Its economy was principally based on the hunting of mammoth herds for meat, fat fuel, hides for tents and large bones and tusks for building winter shelters.

Its name is derived from the village of Pavlov, in the Mikulov Highlands, next to Dolní Věstonice in southern Moravia. The site was excavated in 1952 by the Czechoslovak archaeologist Bohuslav Klíma. Another important Pavlovian site is Předmostí, now part of the town of Přerov.

Excavation has yielded flint implements, polished and drilled stone artifacts, bone spearheads, needles, digging tools, flutes, bone ornaments, drilled animal teeth, and seashells. Art or religious finds are bone carvings and figurines of humans and animals made of mammoth tusk, stone, and fired clay. Textile impression made into wet clay give the oldest proof of the existence of weaving by humans. Evidence of cheek piercing has been found
