= Gravettian =

Archaeological industry of the European Upper Paleolithic

Gravettian (33,000–22,000 BP)
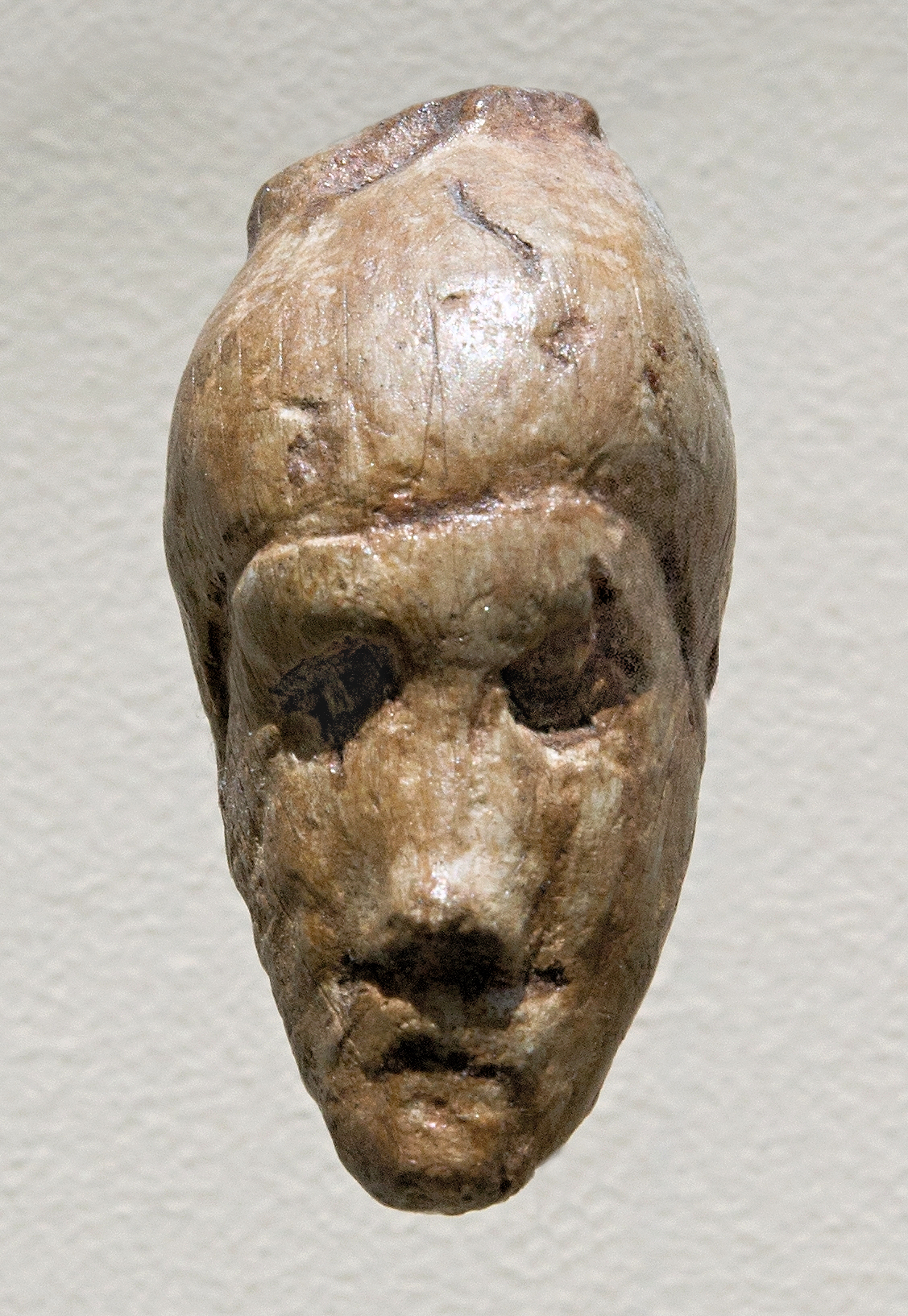
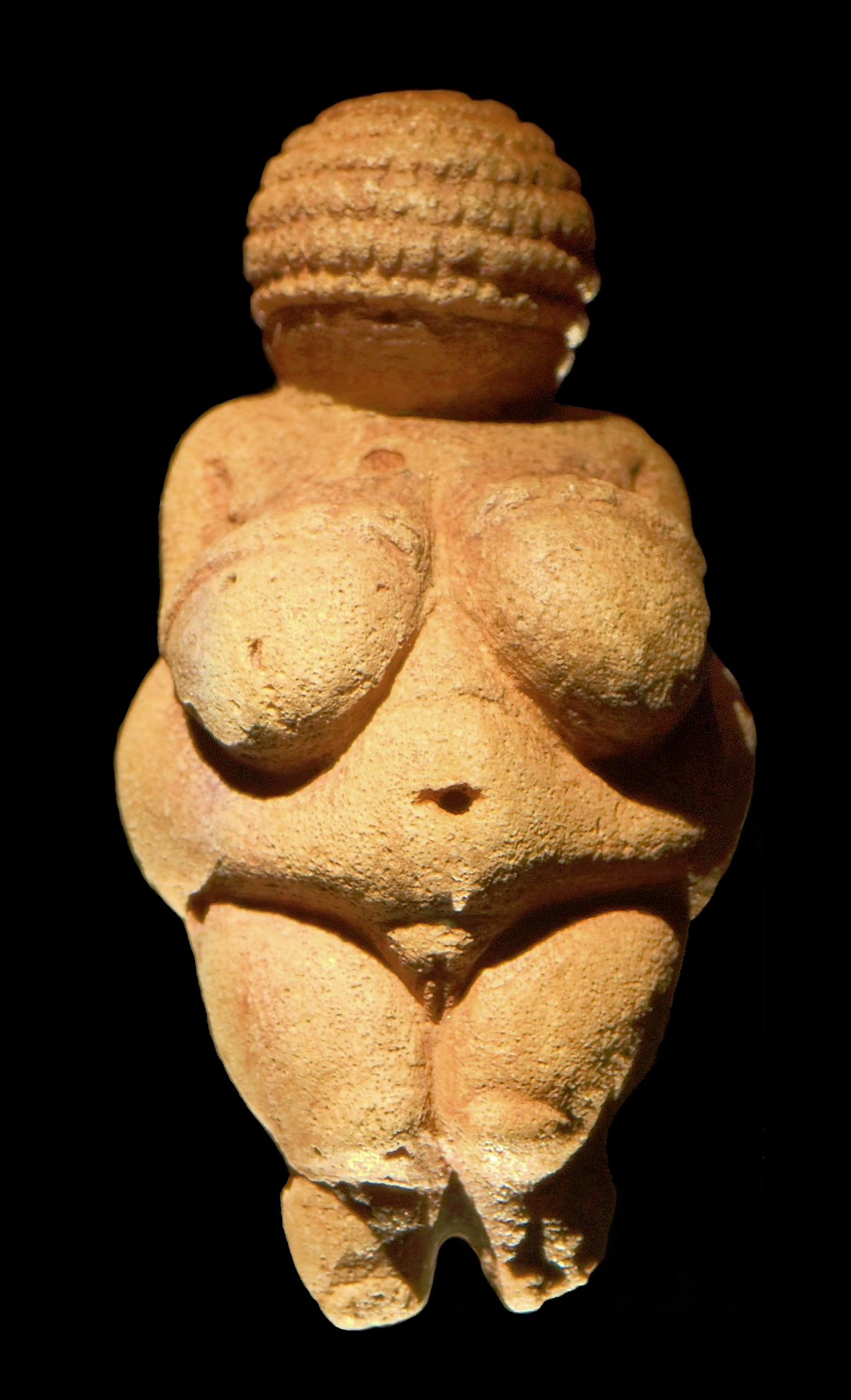
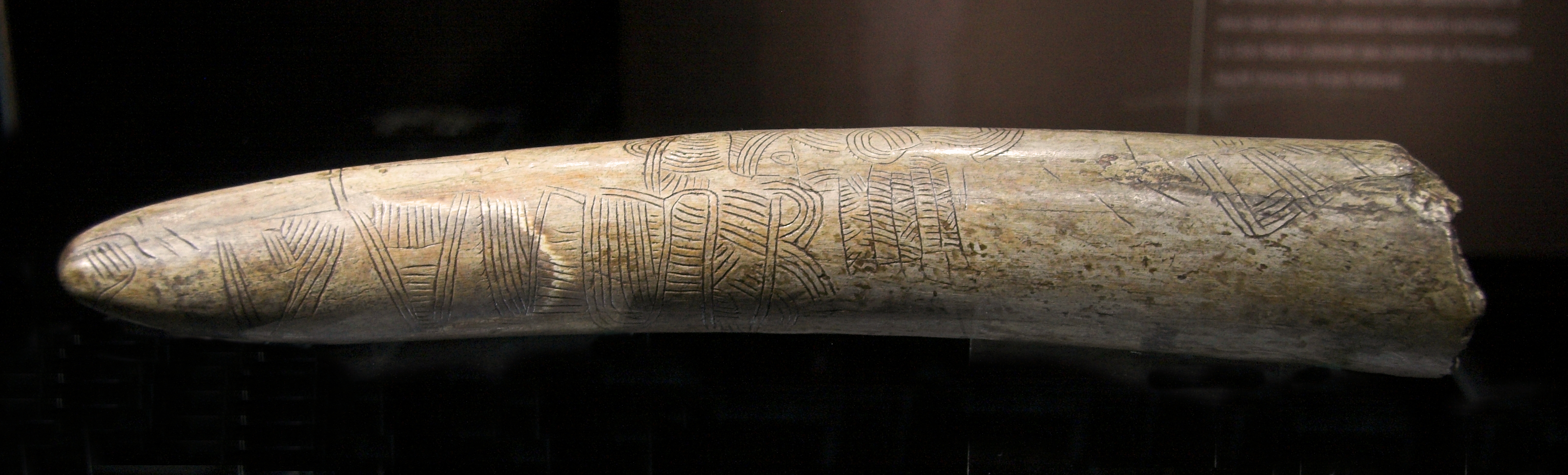
- Left: Female face, ivory carving, Dolní Věstonice, Gravettian, circa 26,000 BP. Right: Venus of Willendorf, circa 25,000 BP. Middle: Engraving on a mammoth tusk. Bottom: Main Gravettian sites
- Alternative names: Upper Paleolithic European hunter-gatherers
- Geographical range: Europe
- Period: Upper Paleolithic
- Dates: 33,000 to 21,000 BP (Note: The transition to the Epigravettian is not well-defined, and the Gravettian may be extended down to 17,000 years ago with the most inclusive definition, based on anything that may be considered Gravettian (burials, venus statues, lithics))
- Type site: La Gravette
- Major sites: Dordogne
- Characteristics: Haplogroup I-M170; Venus figurines
- Preceded by: Aurignacian
- Followed by: Solutrean, Epigravettian
- Defined by: Dorothy Garrod, 1938

Selected Gravettian sites from the ROAD database (CC BY-SA 4.0 ROCEEH)

The Gravettian is an archaeological industry of the European Upper Paleolithic that succeeded the Aurignacian circa 33,000 years BP. It is archaeologically the last European culture many consider unified, and had mostly disappeared by c. 22,000 BP, close to the Last Glacial Maximum, although some elements lasted until c. 17,000 BP. In modern-day Portugal, Spain and France, it was succeeded by the Solutrean and by the Epigravettian in Italy, the Balkans, Ukraine and Russia.

The Gravettian culture is known for their artistic works including the famous Venus figurines, which were typically carved from either ivory or limestone. The culture was first identified at the site of La Gravette in the southwestern French department of Dordogne. While historically assumed to represent a genetically homogenous group, recent analysis of ancient DNA sequences suggests that the Gravettian was produced by multiple genetically divergent groups of hunter-gatherers. Eastern Gravettian-producing groups belong to the Věstonice cluster, while western Gravettian-producing groups belong to the Fournol cluster, both of which have genetic continuity from producers of the earlier Aurignacian. Fournol cluster-related groups are thought to be the ancestors of the producers of the following Solutrean and Magdalenian cultures present in Western Europe after the Last Glacial Maximum, while the producers of the Epigravettian are genetically distinct from Gravettian-producing groups.

== Gravettian culture ==
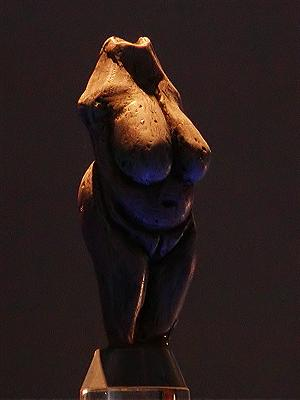
The Venus of Moravany, made of mammoth tusk ivory

The Gravettians were hunter-gatherers who lived in a bitterly cold period of European prehistory, and the Gravettian lifestyle was shaped by the climate. Pleniglacial environmental changes forced them to adapt. West and Central Europe were extremely cold during this period. Archaeologists usually describe two regional variants: the western Gravettian, known mainly from cave sites in France, Spain and Britain, and the eastern Gravettian in Central Europe and Russia. The eastern Gravettians, which include the Pavlovian culture, were specialized mammoth hunters, whose remains are usually found not in caves but in open air sites.

Gravettian culture thrived on their ability to hunt animals. They utilized a variety of tools and hunting strategies. Compared to theorized hunting techniques of Neanderthals and earlier human groups, Gravettian hunting culture appears much more mobile and complex. They lived in caves or semi-subterranean or rounded dwellings which were typically arranged in small "villages". Gravettians are thought to have been innovative in the development of tools such as blunted-back knives, tanged arrowheads and boomerangs. Other innovations include the use of woven nets and oil lamps made of stone. Blades and bladelets were used to make decorations and bone tools from animal remains.

Gravettian culture extends across a large geographic region, as far as Estremadura in Portugal, but is relatively homogeneous until about 27,000 BP. They developed burial rites, which included simple, purpose-built offerings and/or personal ornaments owned by the deceased, placed within the grave or tomb. Surviving Gravettian art includes numerous cave paintings and small, portable Venus figurines made from clay or ivory, as well as jewelry objects. The fertility deities mostly date from the early period; there are over 100 known surviving examples. They conform to a very specific physical type, with large breasts, broad hips and prominent posteriors. The statuettes tend to lack facial details, and their limbs are often broken off.

During the post glacial period, evidence of the culture begins to disappear from northern Europe but was continued in areas around the Mediterranean.

The Mal'ta Culture (c. 24,000 BP) in Siberia is often considered as belonging to the Gravettian, due to its similar characteristics, particularly its Venus figurines, but any hypothetical connection would have to be cultural and not genetic: a 2016 genomic study showed that the Mal'ta people have no genetic connections with the people of the European Gravettian culture (the Vestonice Cluster).

== Diet ==
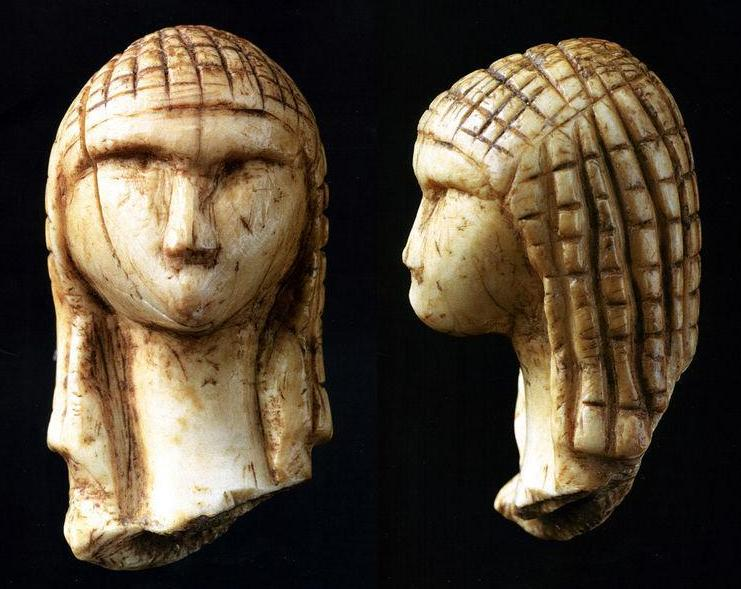
The Lady of Brassempouy from the Western Gravettian

Animals were a primary food source for humans of the Gravettian period. Since Europe was extremely cold during this period, they preferred food sources high in energy and fat content. Testing comparisons among various human remains reveal that populations at higher latitudes placed greater dietary emphasis on meat. A defining trait distinguishing Gravettian people was their ease of mobility compared to their Neanderthal counterparts. Modern humans developed the technology and social organization that enabled them to migrate with their food source whereas Neanderthals were not adept at travelling, even with relatively sedentary herds.

With their ability to move with the herds, Gravettian diets incorporated a broad variety of animal prey. Gravettian diet included larger animals such as mammoths, hyenas, wolves, and reindeer killed with stone or bone tools, as well as hares and foxes captured with nets. This time period is classified by the strong emphasis on meat consumption because agriculture had not been fully introduced nor utilized. In addition, the climate was not favorable to stable crop cultivation.

Seafood accounted for a significant portion of coastal Gravettians' diet. From remains found in Italy and Wales, isotope analysis reveals that 20–30% of Gravettian diets of coastal peoples consisted of sea animals. Populations of lower latitudes relied more on shellfish and fish while higher latitudes' diets consisted of seals.

== Physical type ==
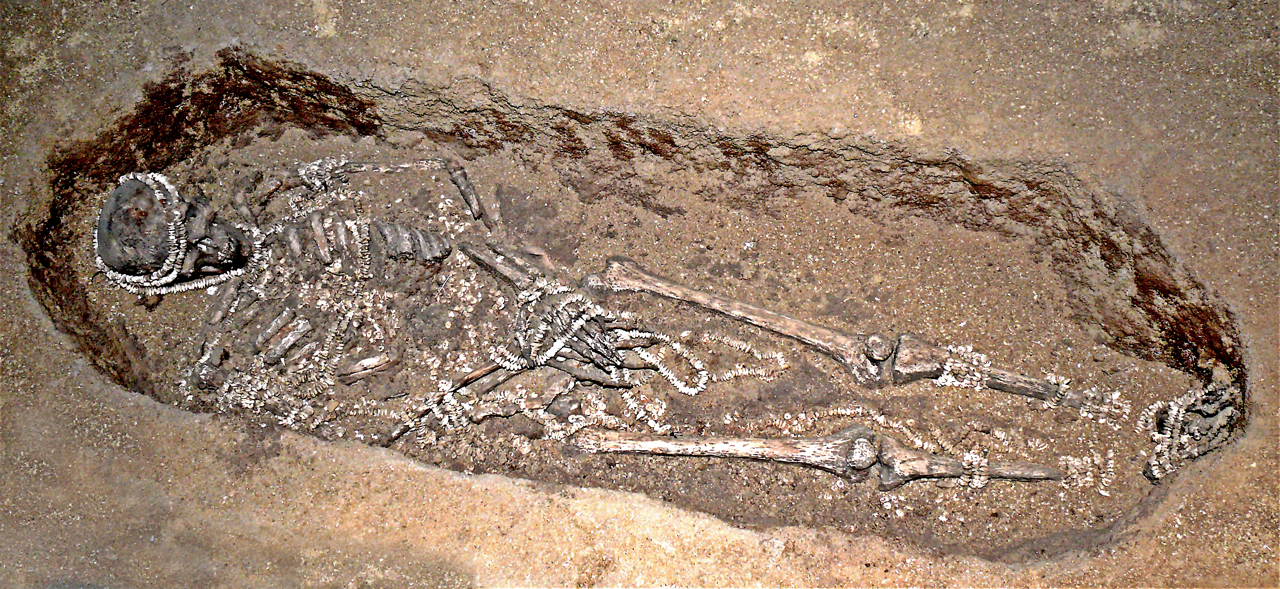
Burial with jewellery at Sungir, Russia, c. 30,000 BC

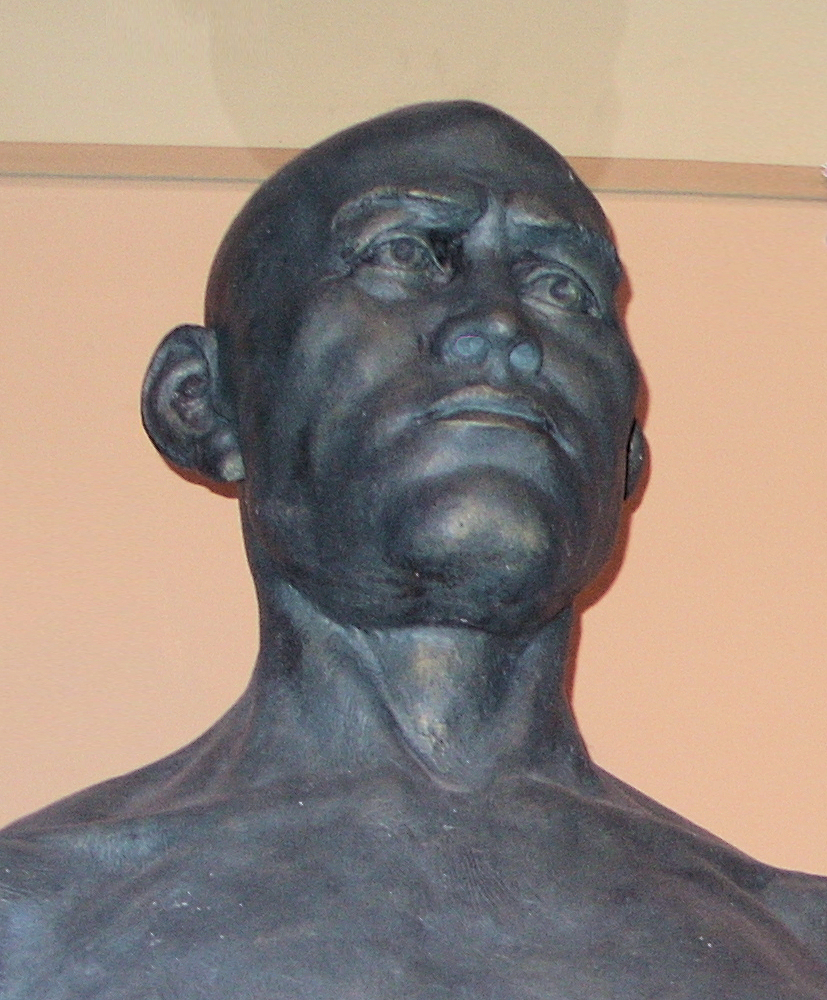
Sunghir man, forensic reconstruction by M.M. Gerasimov

Physical remains of people of the Gravettian have revealed that they were tall and relatively slender people. The male height of the Gravettian culture ranged between 179 and 188 centimetres (5 ft 10 in and 6 ft 2 in) tall with an average of 183.5 centimetres (6 ft 0.2 in), which is exceptionally tall not only for that period of prehistory, but for all periods of history.

They were fairly slender and normally weighed between 67–73 kilograms (148–161 lb), although they would likely have had a higher ratio of lean muscle mass compared to body fat in comparison to modern humans as a result of a very physically active and demanding lifestyle. The females of the Gravettian were much shorter, standing 158 centimetres (5 ft 2 in) on average, with an average weight of 54 kilograms (119 lb). Examinations of Gravettian skulls reveal that high cheekbones were common among them.

== Hunting ==
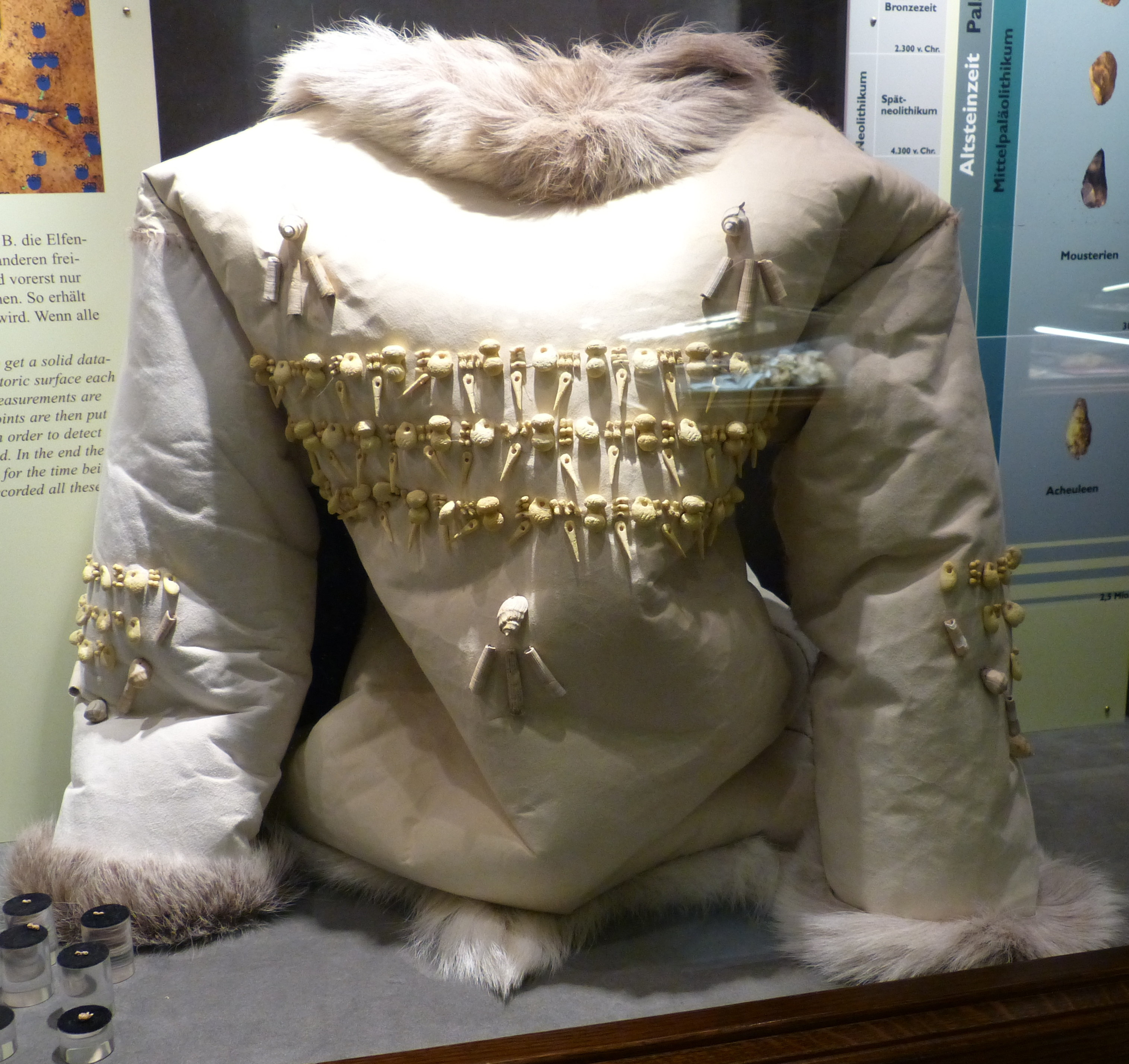
Reconstruction of clothing and bone ornaments

Clubs, stones and sticks were the primary hunting tools during the Upper Paleolithic period. Bone, antler and ivory points have all been found at sites in France; but proper stone arrowheads and throwing spears did not appear until the Solutrean period (~20,000 Before Present). Due to the primitive tools, many animals were hunted at close range. The typical artefact of Gravettian industry, once considered diagnostic, is the small pointed blade with a straight blunt back. They are today known as the Gravette point, and were used to hunt big game. Gravettians used nets to hunt small game.

Gravettian settlers tended towards the valleys that pooled migrating prey. Examples found through discoveries in Gr. La Gala, a site in Southern Italy, show a strategic settlement based in a small valley. As the settlers became more aware of the migration patterns of animals like red deer, they learned to prey herd in valleys, thereby allowing the hunters to avoid travelling long distances for food. Specifically in Gr. La Gala, the glacial topography forced the deer to pass through the areas in the valley occupied by humans. Additional evidence of strategically positioned settlements include sites like Klithi in Greece, also placed to intercept migrating prey.

Discoveries in the Czech Republic suggest that nets were used to capture large numbers of smaller prey, offering a quick and consistent food supply and thus an alternative to the feast/famine pattern of large game hunters. Evidence comes in the form of 4 mm (0.16 in) thick rope preserved on clay imprints. Research suggests that although no larger net imprints have been discovered, there would be little reason for them not to be made as no further knowledge would be required for their creation. The weaving of nets was likely a communal task, relying on the work of both women and children.

== Material culture ==
=== Animal remains ===
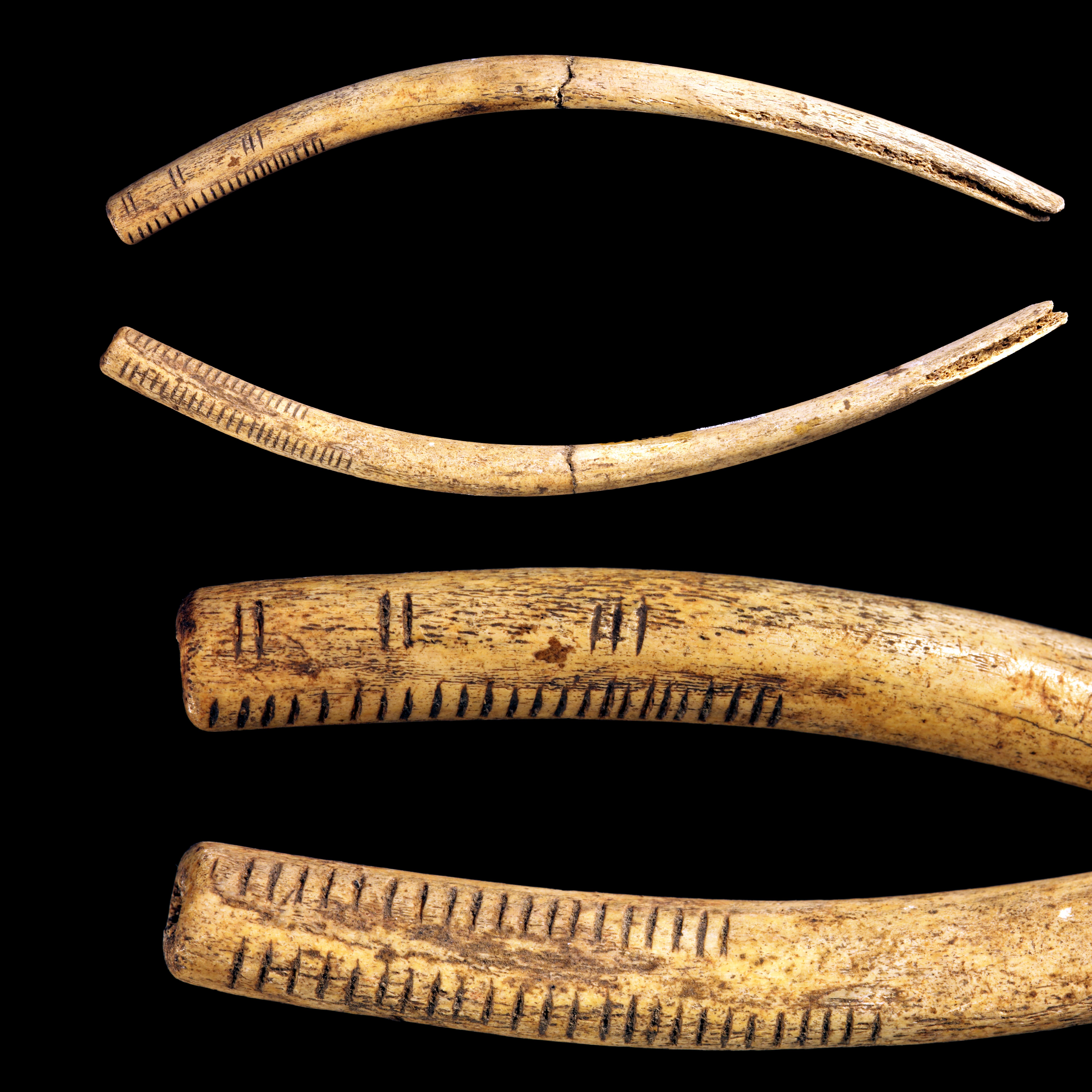
Marks on animal ivory or horn.

The Gravettian era landscape is most closely related to the landscape of present-day Moravia. Pavlov I in southern Moravia is the most complete and complex Gravettian site presently found and dates back to 26,000 years ago. It provides a perfect model for a general understanding of Gravettian culture. In many instances, animal remains indicate both decorative and utilitarian purposes. In the case of, for example, Arctic foxes, incisors and canines were used for decoration, while their humeri and radii bones were used as tools. Similarly, the skeletons of some red foxes contain decorative incisors and canines as well as ulnas used for awls and barbs.

Some animal bones were only used to create tools. Due to their shape, the ribs, fibulas, and metapodia of horses were good for awl and barb creation. In addition, the ribs were also implemented to create different types of smoothers for pelt preparation. The shapes of hare bones are also unique, and as a result, the ulnas were commonly used as awls and barbs. Reindeer antlers, ulnas, ribs, tibias and teeth were utilised in addition to a rare documented case of a phalanx. Mammoth remnants are among the most common bone remnants of the culture, while long bones and molars are also documented. Some mammoth bones were used for decorative purposes. Wolf remains were often used for tool production and decoration.

=== Textiles ===
Also at Pavlov I, negative impressions of woven textiles or basketry have been found on fired clay fragments in ash deposits in and around hearths within dwellings. Radiocarbon dating places them between approximately 26,980-24,870 BP. The four clay impressions show two distinct types of twining: Type I (Open Simple Twining with Z Twist Weft) and Type II (Open Diagonal Twining with S Twist Weft). Both types show technical sophistication, suggesting prior development in fiber technology. The warps measure only 0.073-0.092 mm in diameter for Type I and 0.049-0.065 mm for Type II, with approximately 12 warps per centimeter. Researchers could not determine whether they came from textiles or basketry and so may have been portions of bags, mats, or fully flexible fabrics like clothing. They were likely made with some form of non-heddle frame or loom. While the plant fibers remain unidentified, pollen analysis at the site suggest they could have from the bark of alder and yew trees, or from herbaceous plants like milkweed and nettle.

== Genetics ==
Fu et al. (2016) examined the remains of fourteen Gravettians. The eight males included three samples of Y-chromosomal haplogroup CT, one of I, one IJK, one BT, one C1a2, and one sample of F. Of the fourteen samples of mtDNA, there were thirteen samples of U and one sample of M. The majority of the sample of U belonged to the U5 and U2. Teschler et al. (2020) examined the remains of one adult male and two twin boys from a Gravettian site in Austria. All belonged to haplogroup Y-Haplogroup I. and all had the same mtDNA, U5. According to Scorrano et al. (2022), "the genome of an early European individual from Kostenki 14, dated to around 37,000 years ago, demonstrated that the ancestral European gene pool was already established by that time."

A 2023 study found that Gravettian-producing peoples belonged to two genetically distinct clusters. Fournol in the west (France and Spain) and Věstonice in the east (Czech Republic, Poland, Austria, Slovakia and Italy) both of whom traced their descent from producers of the earlier Aurignacian culture. Some individuals showed mixed ancestry from both clusters where the range of the two clusters bordered. The study found that members of the western Fournol cluster were ancestral to later Western European Cro-Magnon groups that existed after the Last Glacial Maximum, the producers of the Solutrean and Magdalenian cultures. All Gravettian-producing peoples are strongly genetically distinct from the producers of the later Epigravettian, who are genetically referred to as the Villabruna cluster, who show a greater affinity to ancient and modern peoples in West Asia than other Palaeolithic European hunter-gatherer groups. There is evidence of some genetic affinity between the Villabruna and Věstonice clusters, which may reflect shared common ancestry from the Balkans region.

== Gallery ==
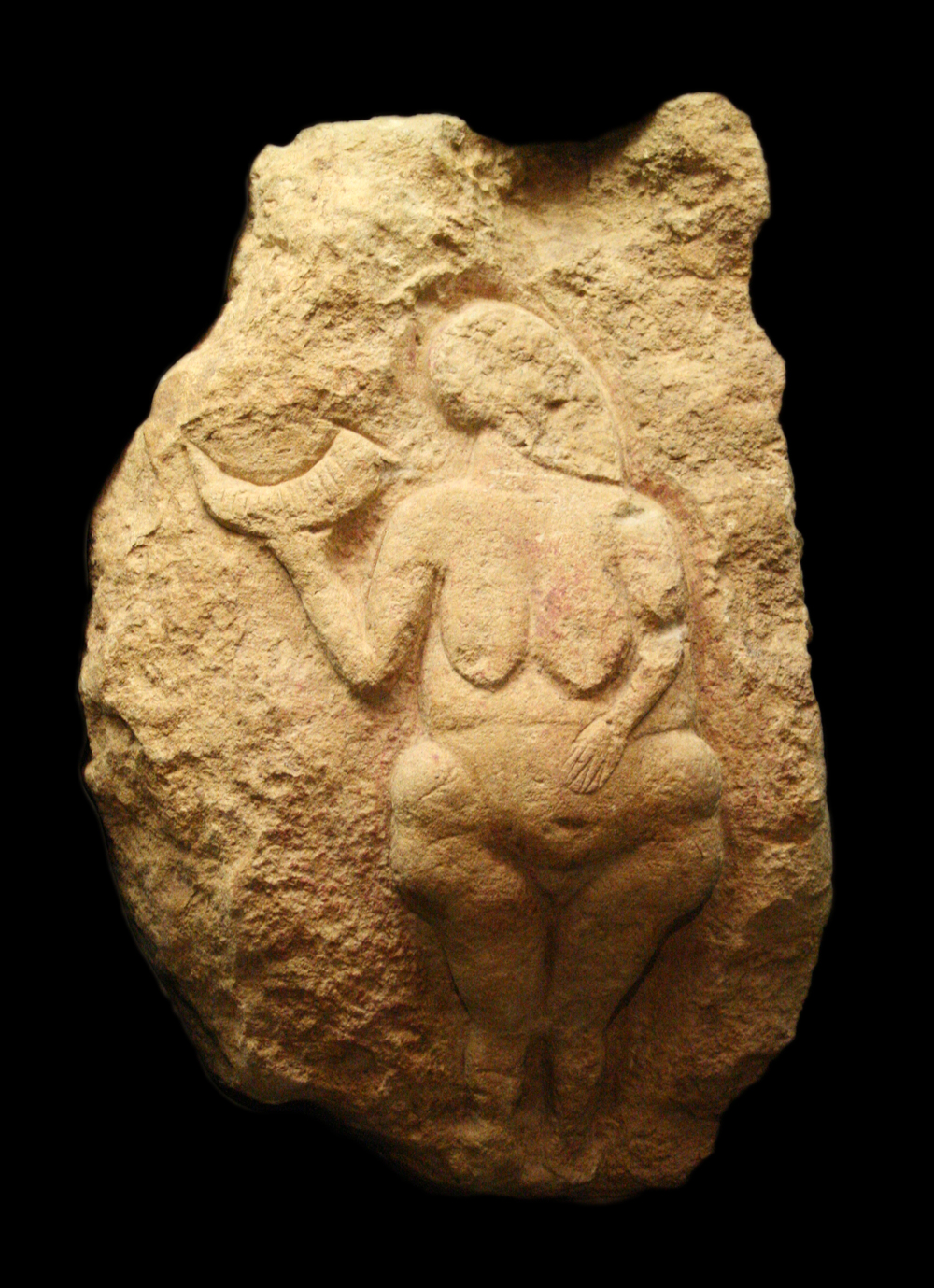
Venus of Laussel, France, c. 23,000 BC. The markings on the horn may represent the lunar cycle.

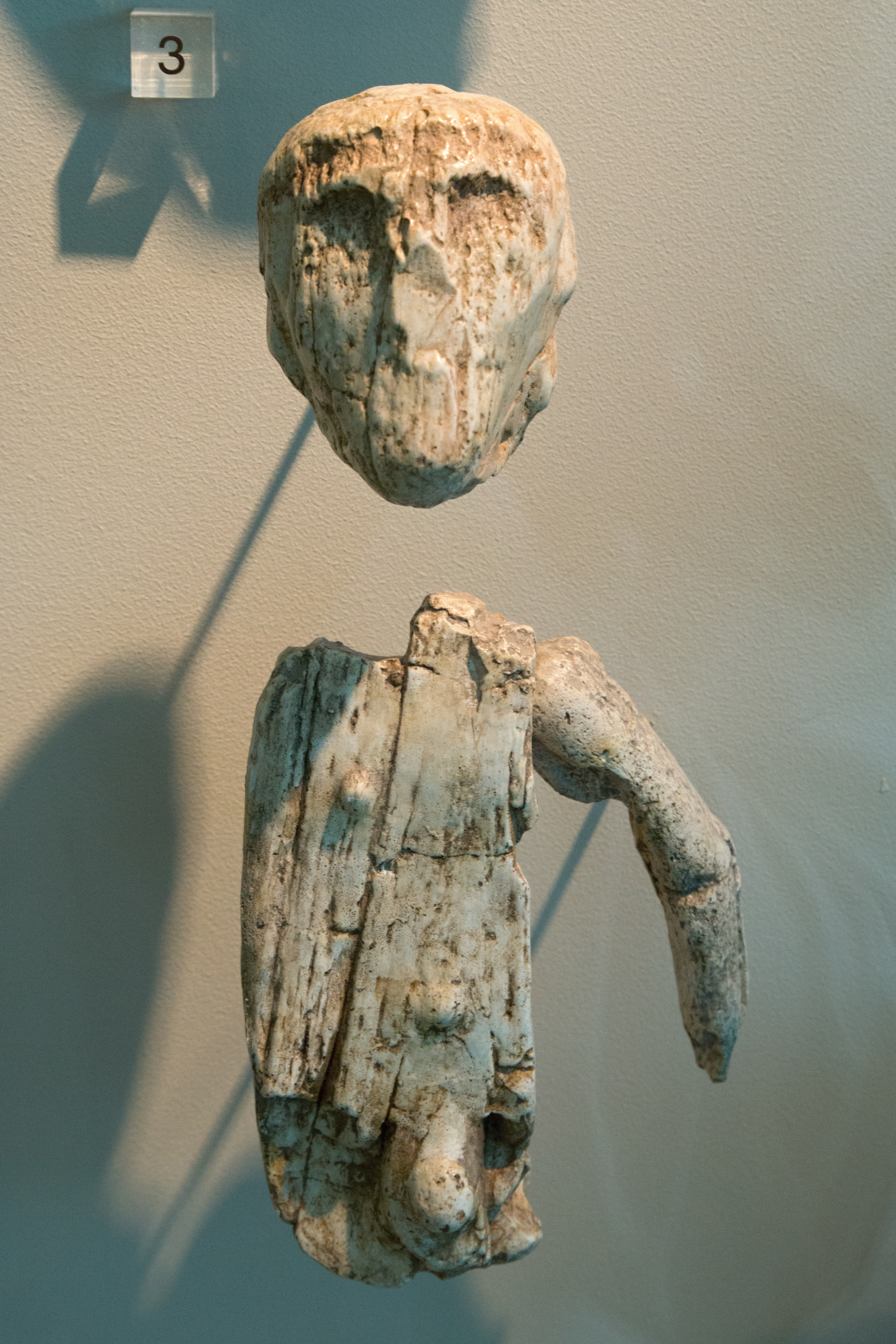
Male figurine, mammoth ivory, Anthropos, Brno

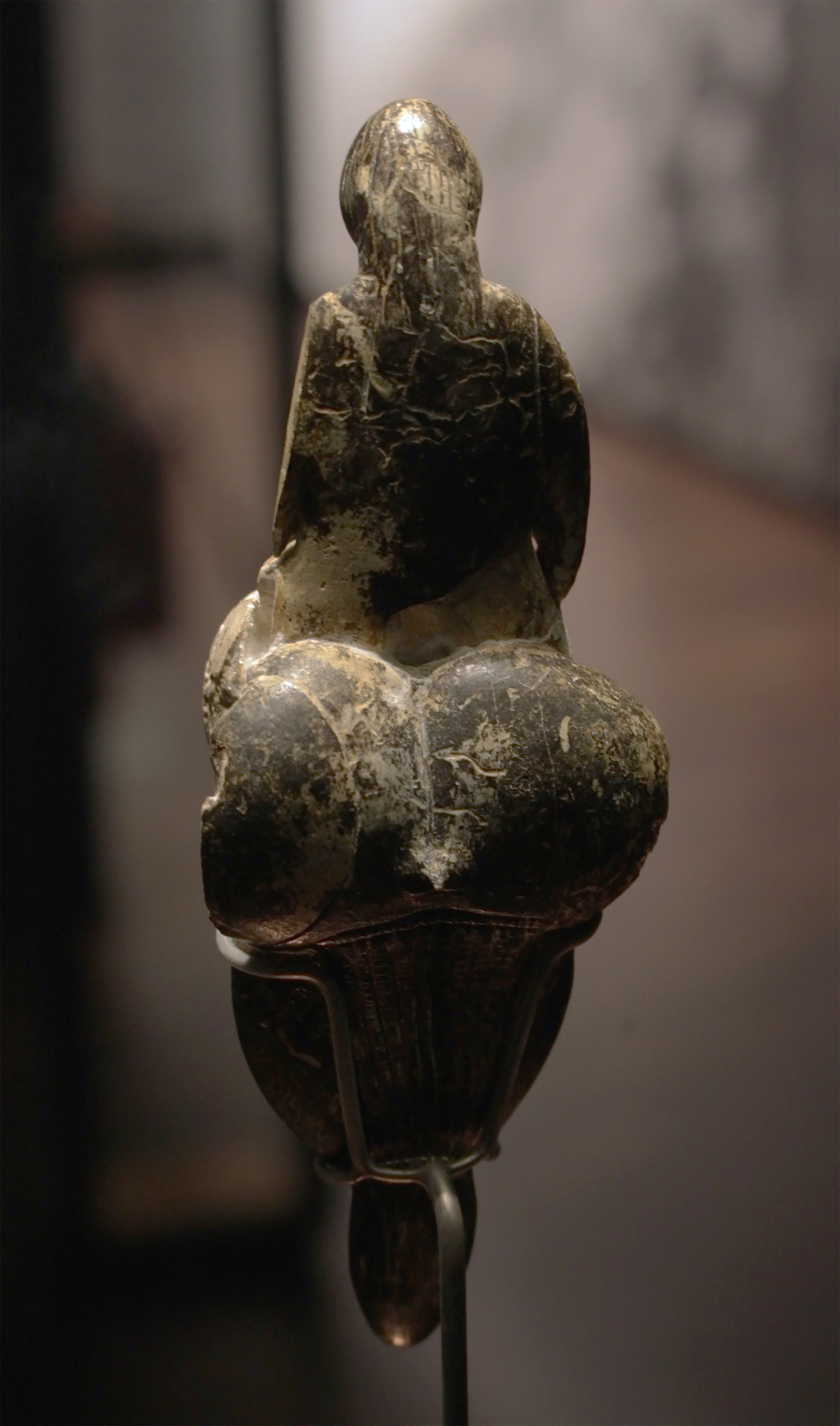
Venus of Lespugue

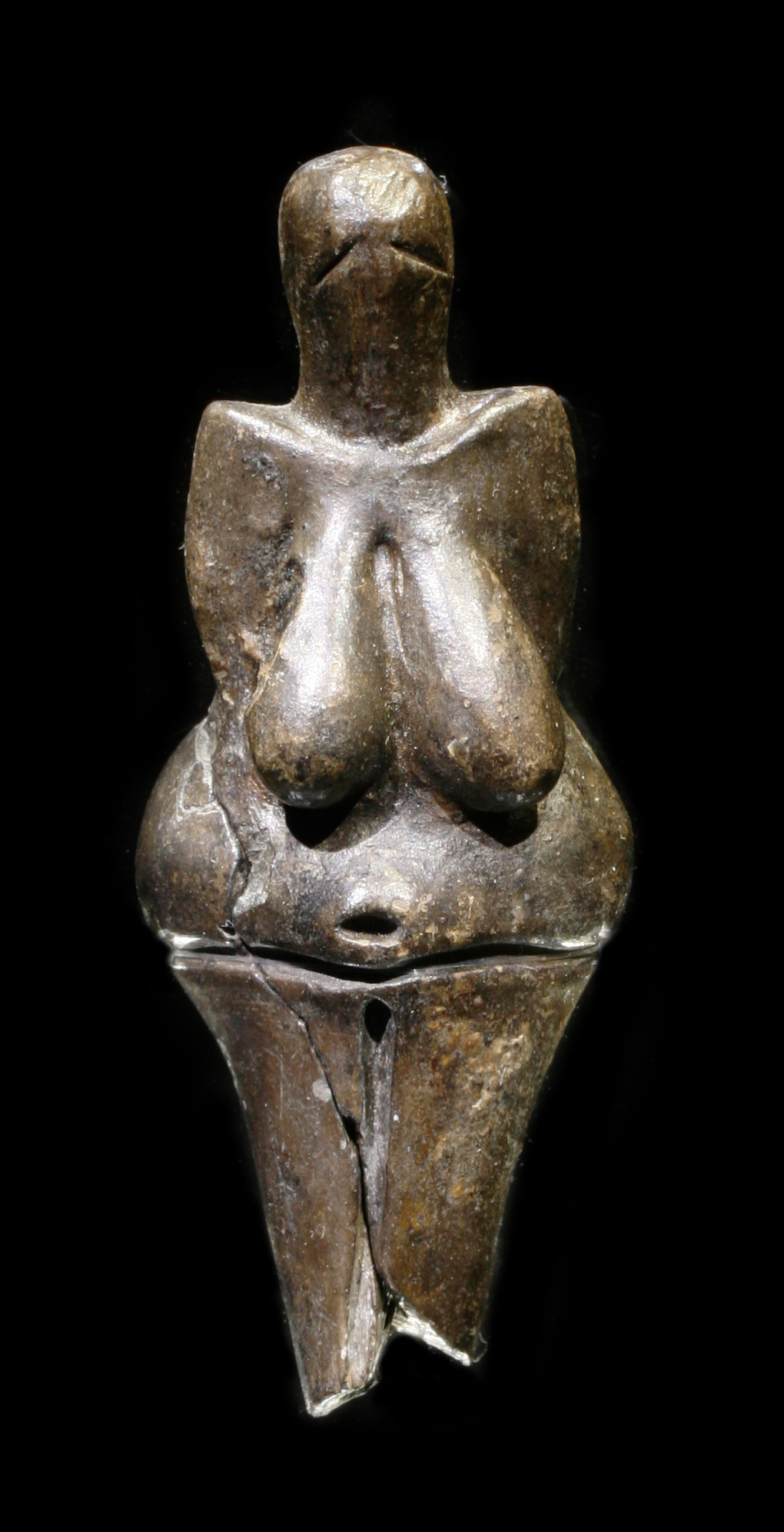
Venus of Dolní Věstonice

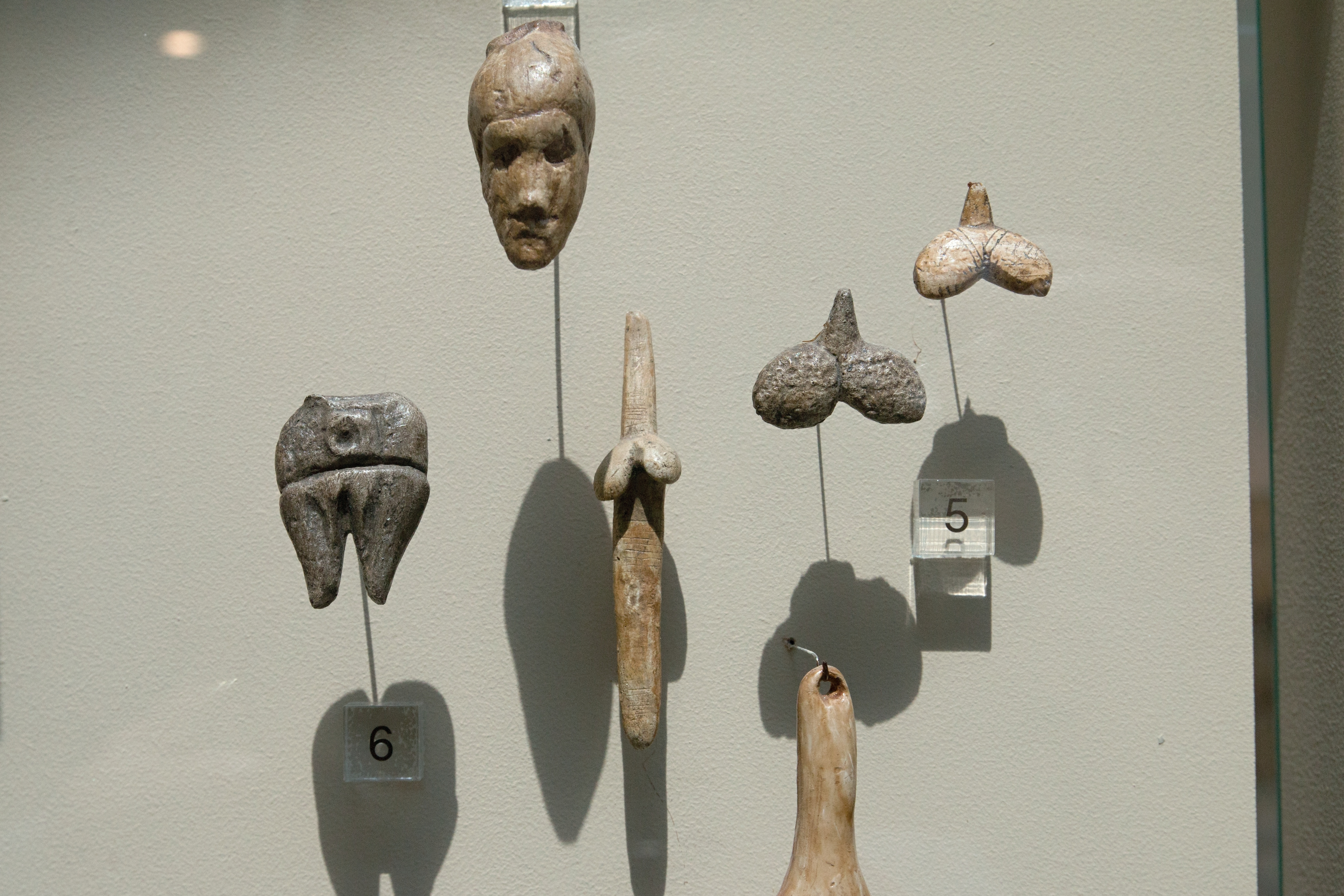
Female figurines, Gravettian, Anthropos, Brno

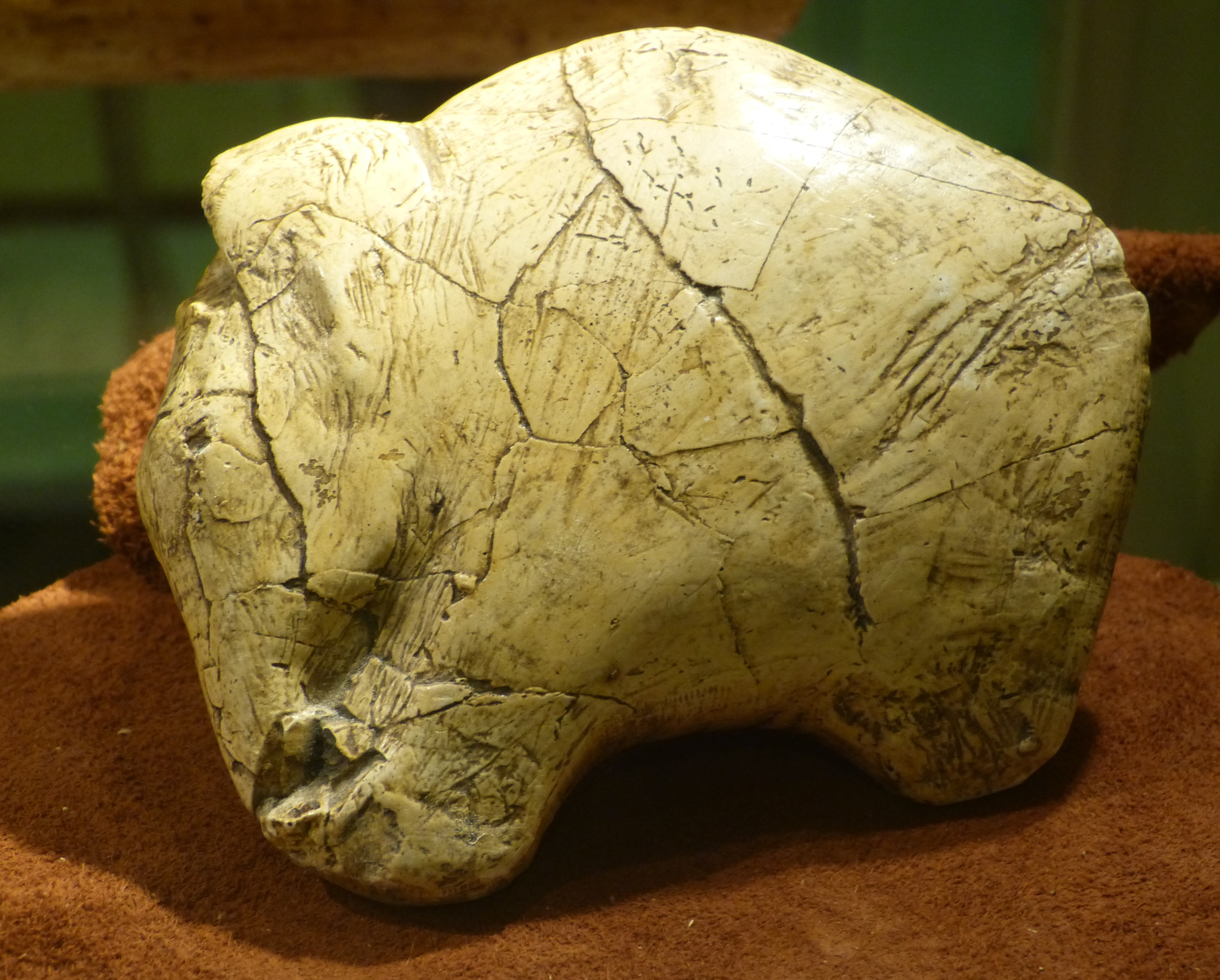
Mammoth figurine from Predmosti, Czech Republic

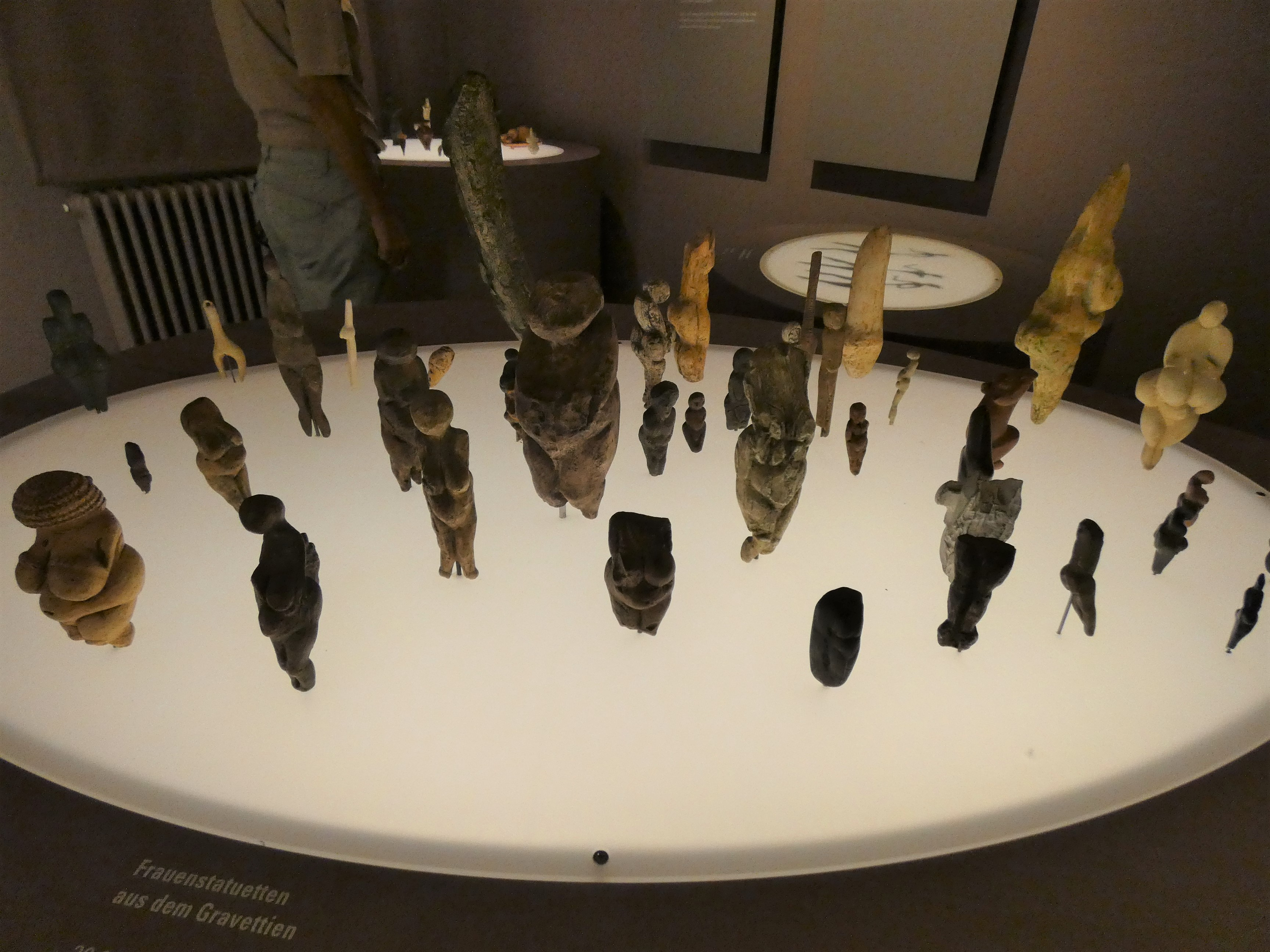
Various Gravettian statuettes

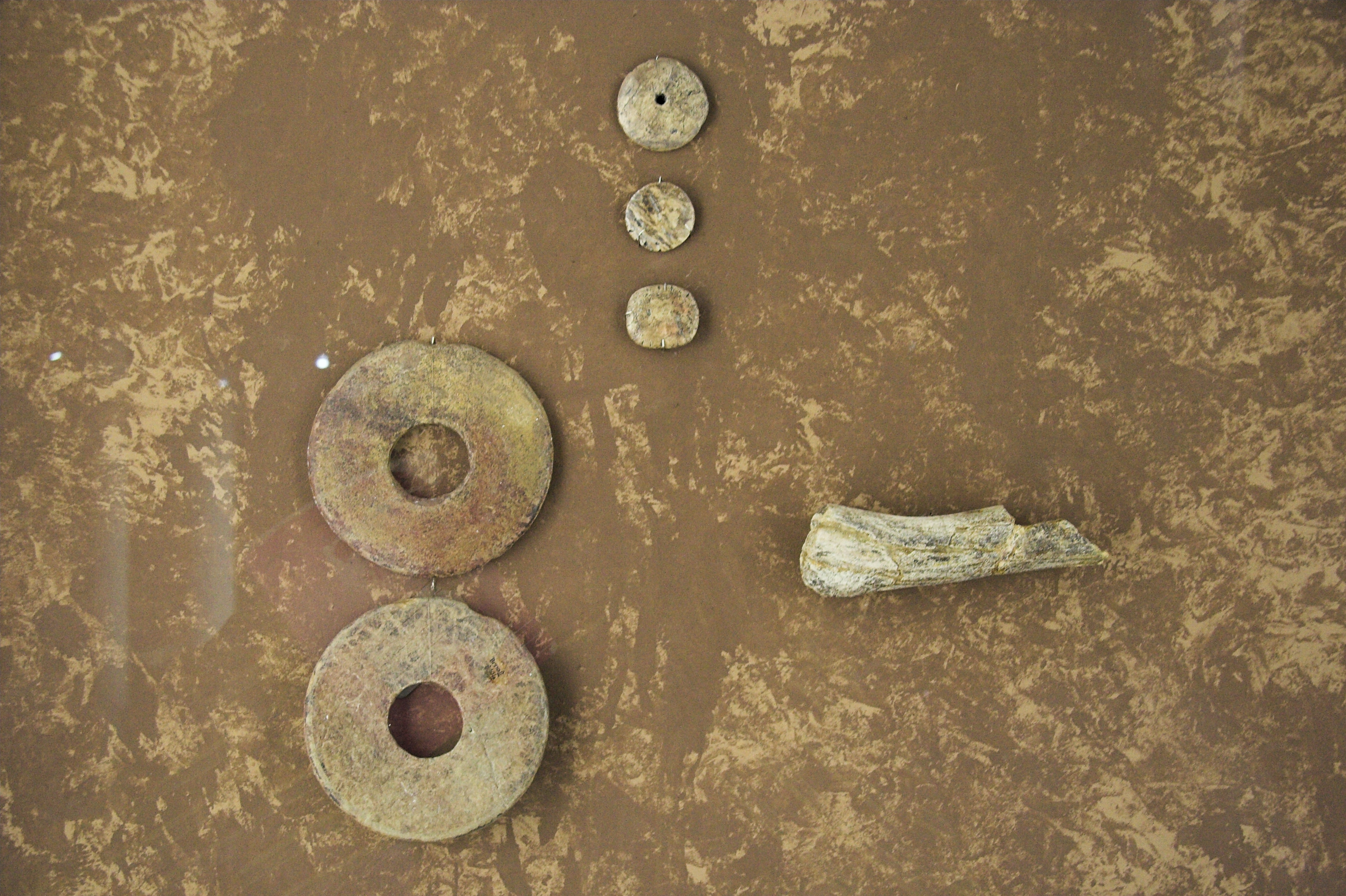
Shaman equipment, Brno, Gravettian

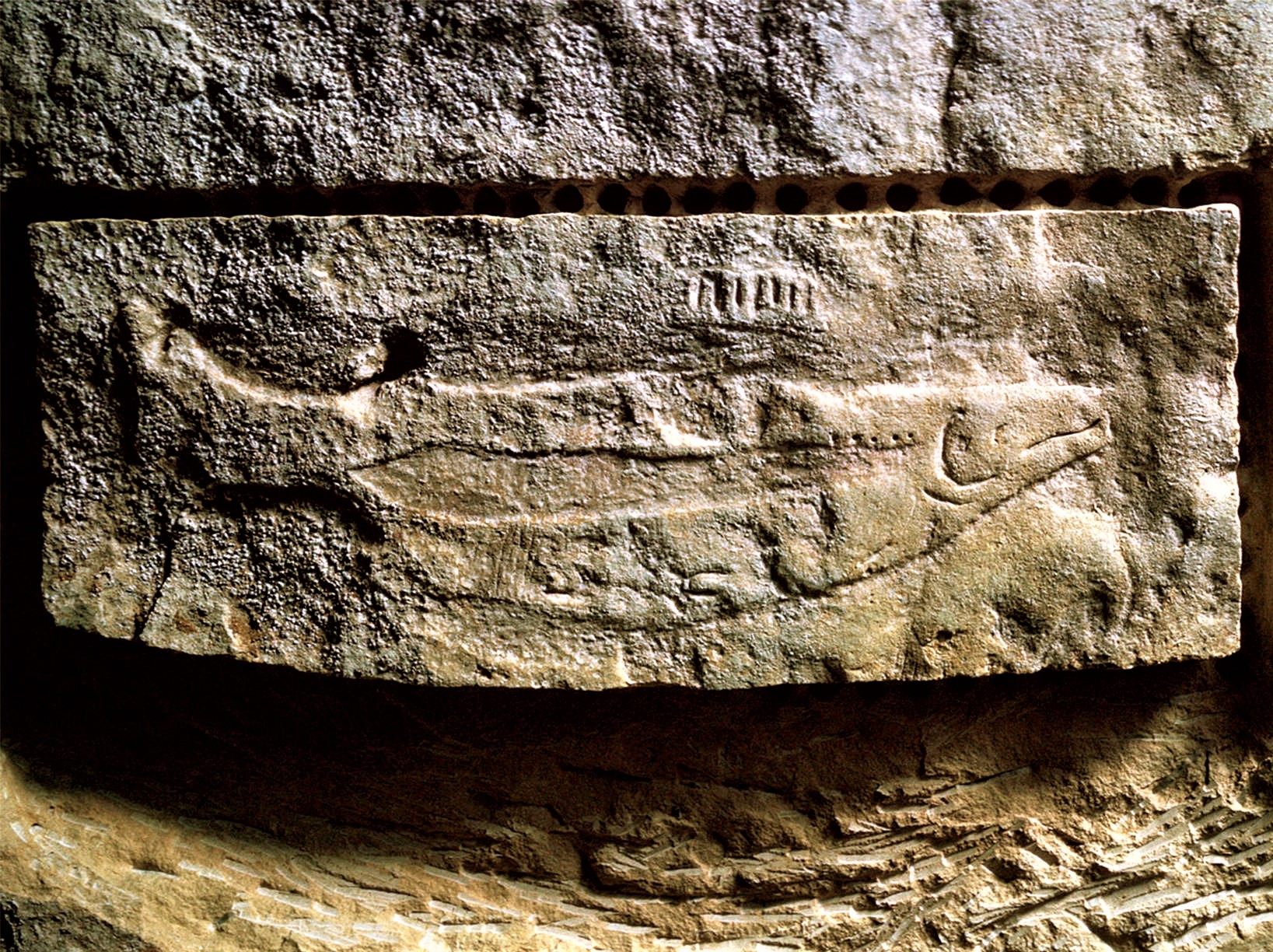
Fish in Abri du Poisson Cave

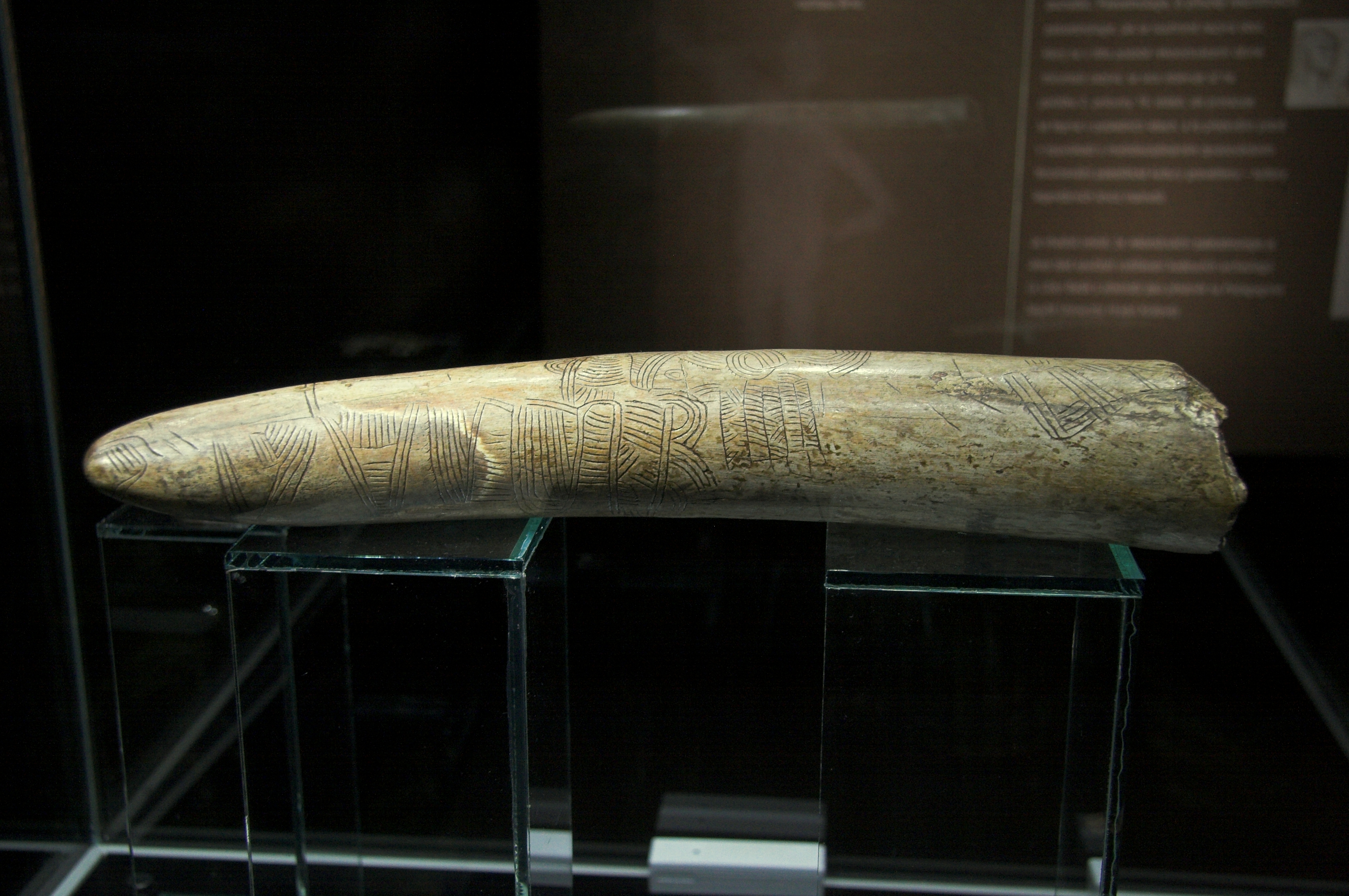
Engraving on a mammoth tusk, map

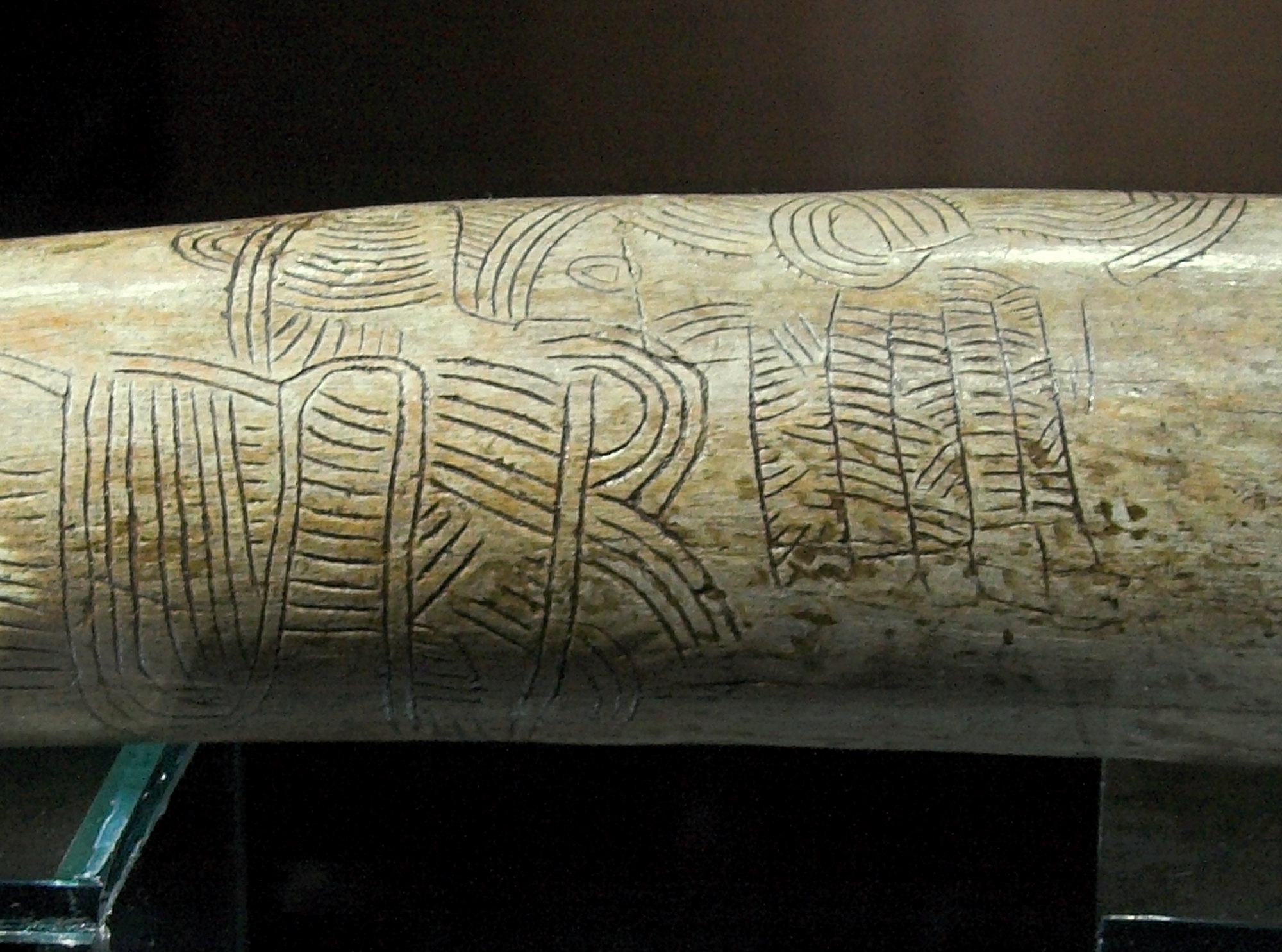
Engraving on a mammoth tusk, map

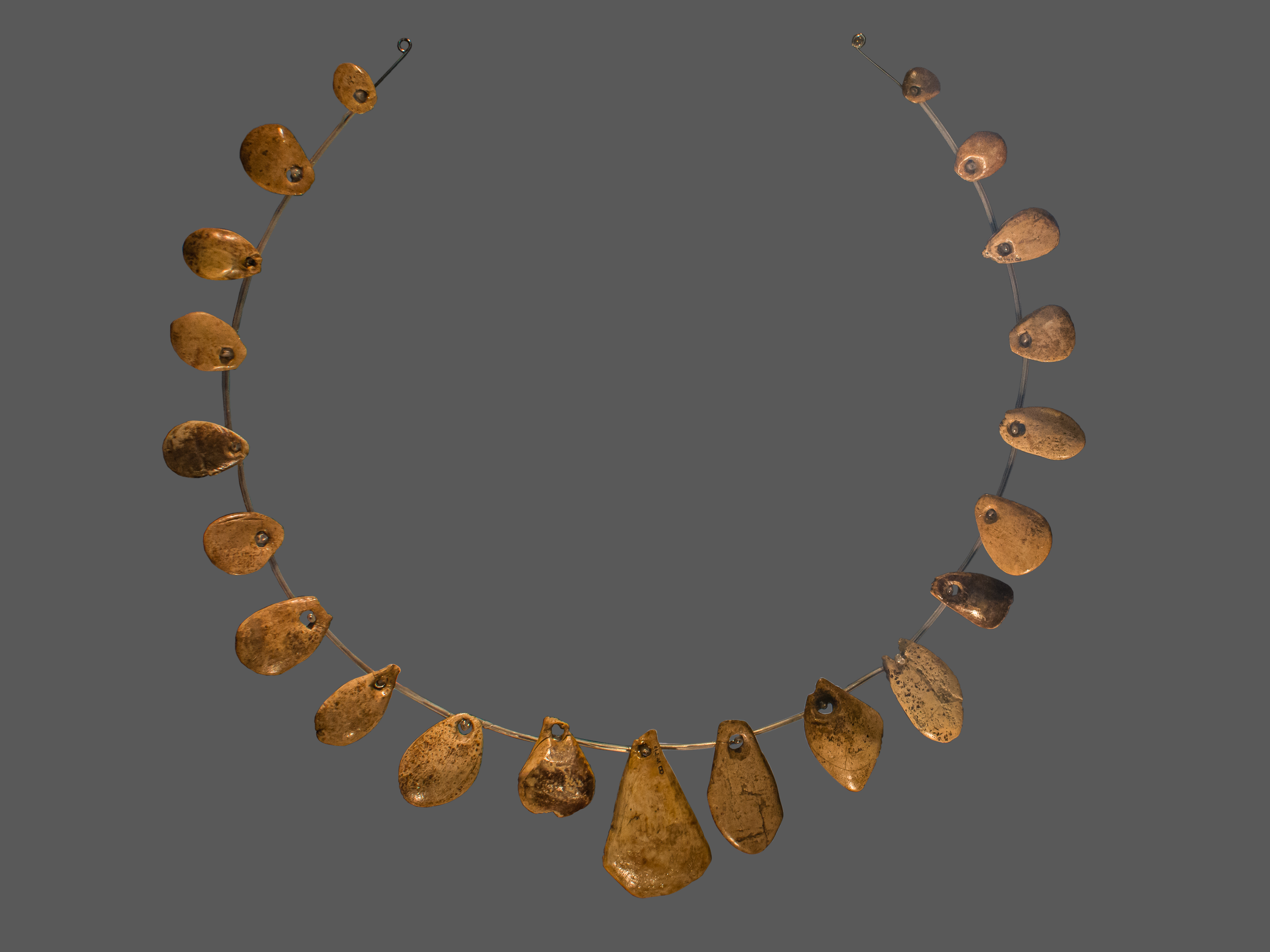
Gravettian necklace

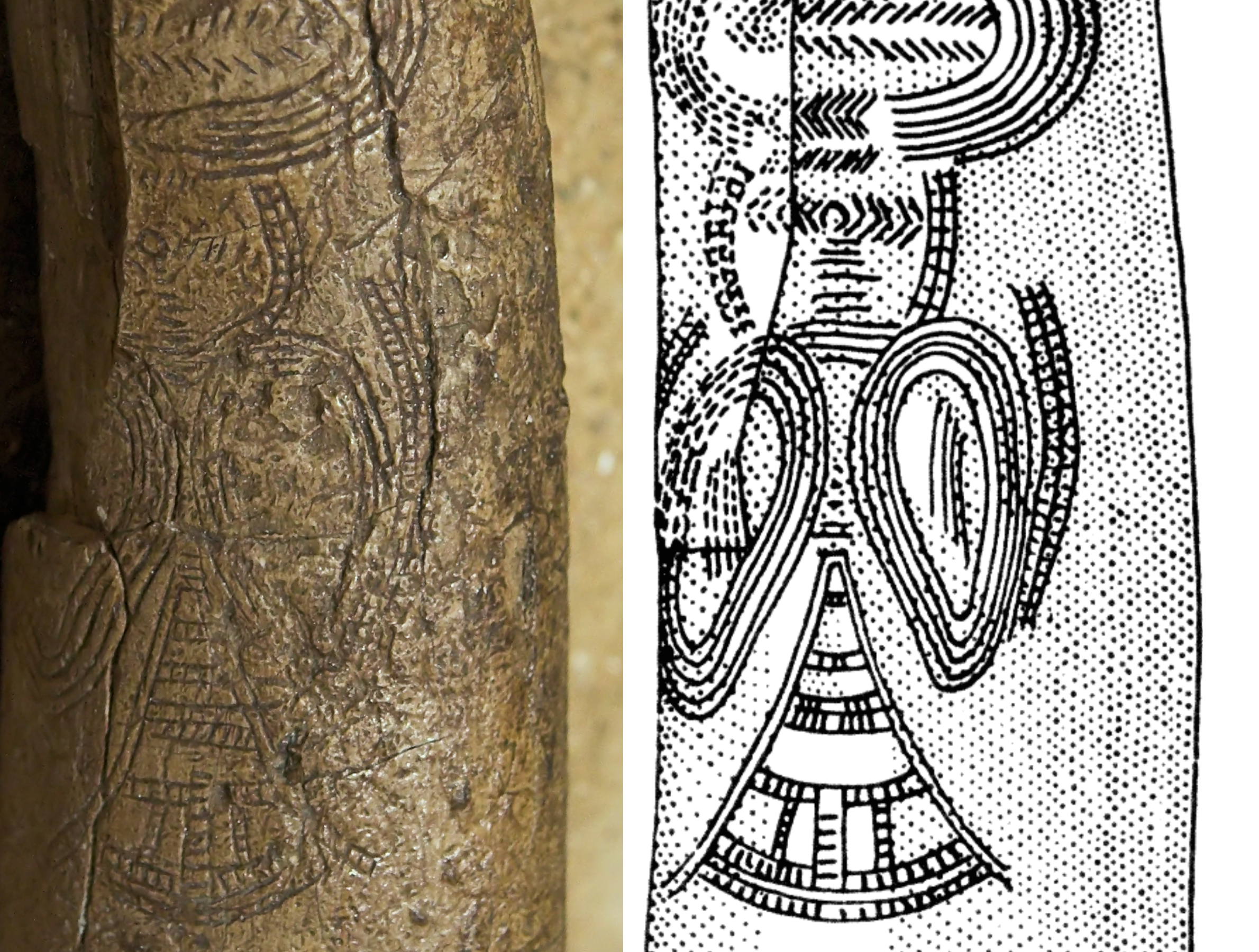
Gravettian engraving (Venus of Předmostí)

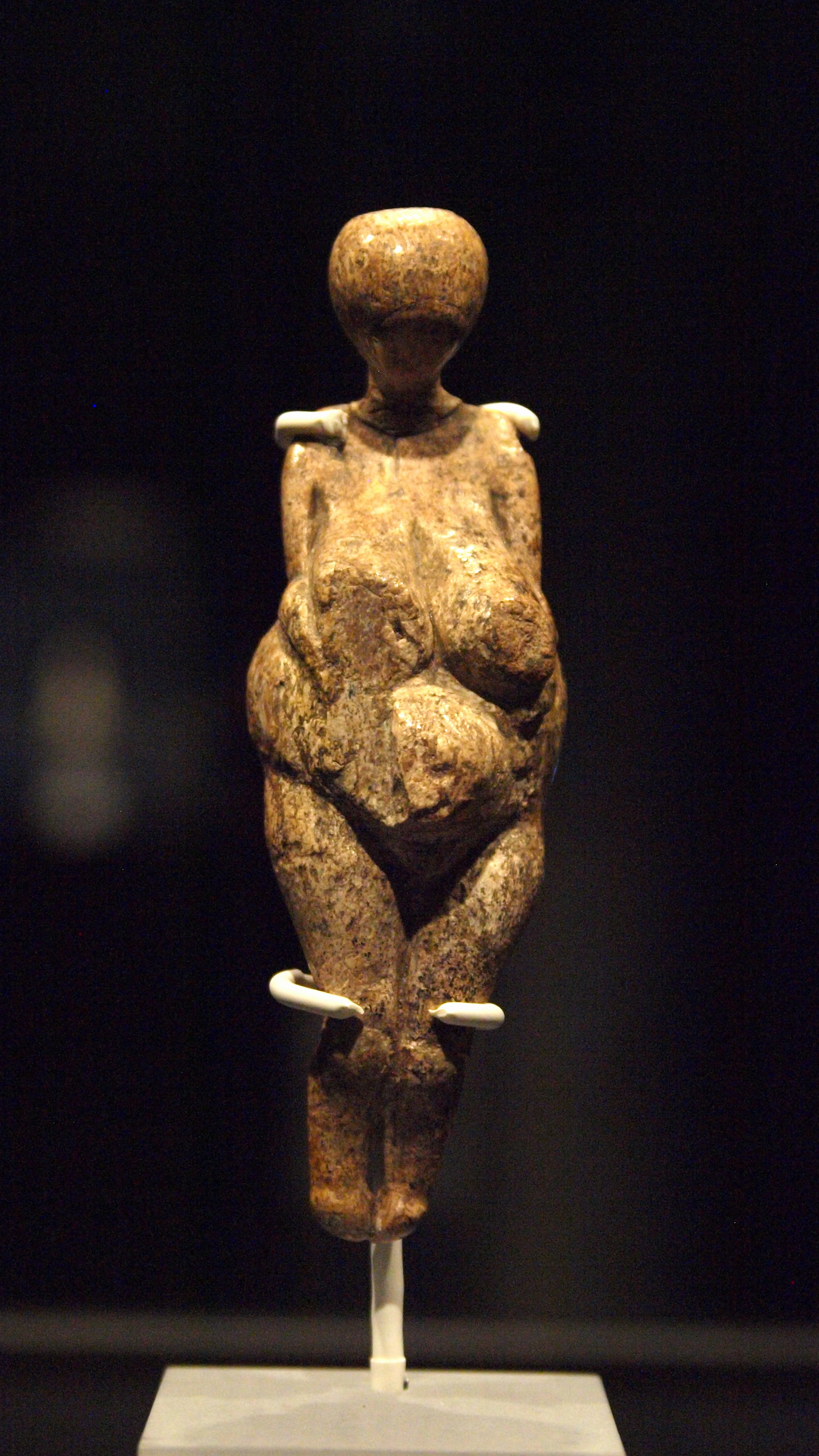
Venus figurine from Kostenki, Russia

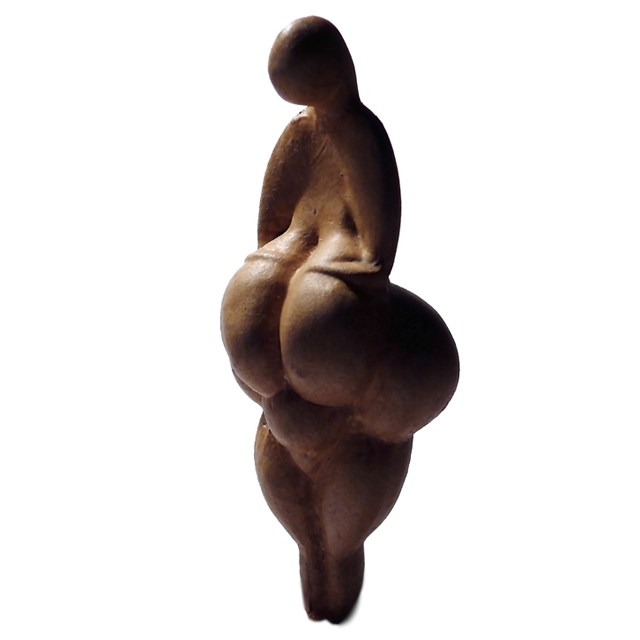
Replica of the Venus of Lespugue

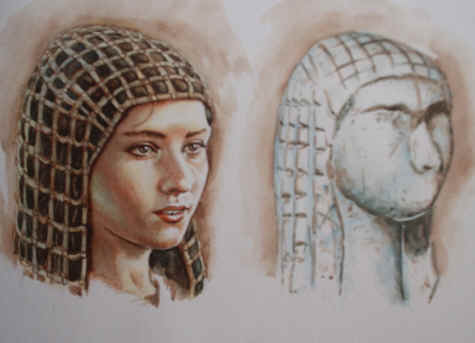
Reconstruction of the Lady of Brassempouy by Libor Balák

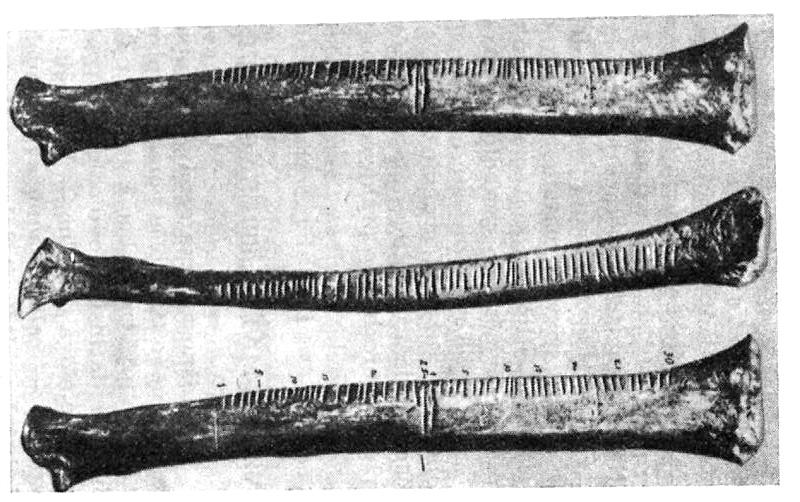
Engraved 'Wolf Bone' from Dolni Vestonice, c. 26,000 BP. The notches may represent numbers.

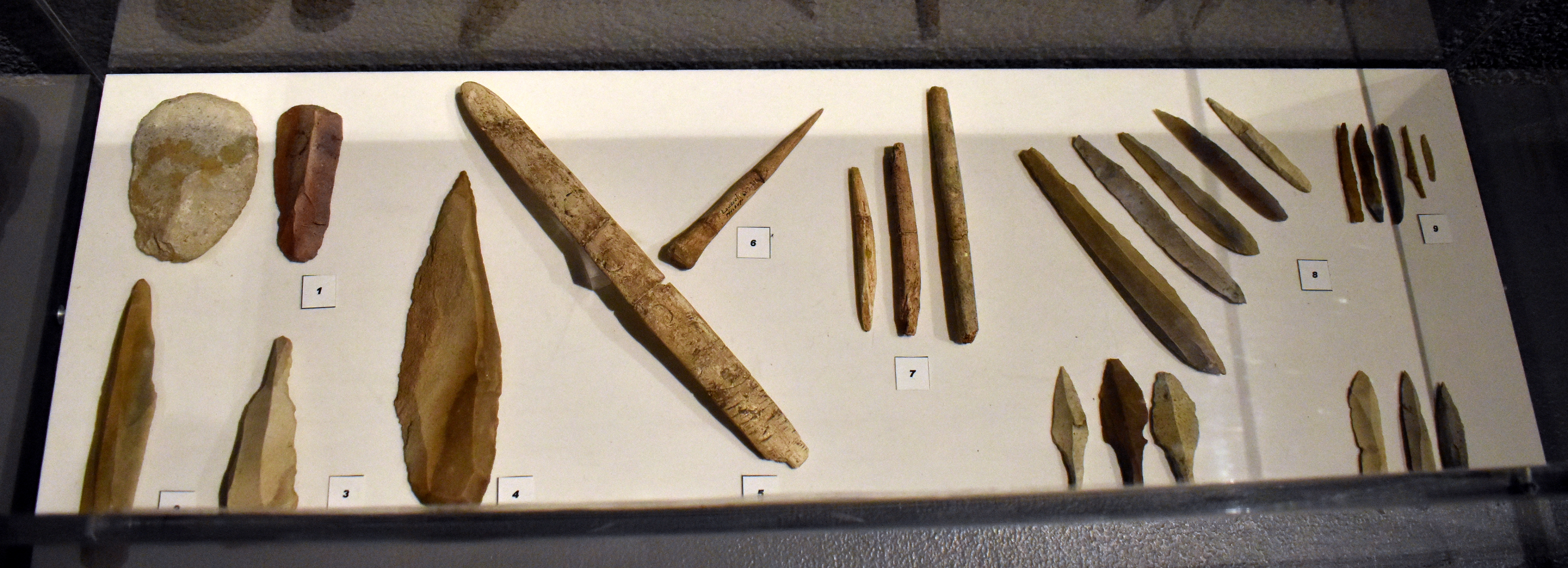
Tools, France

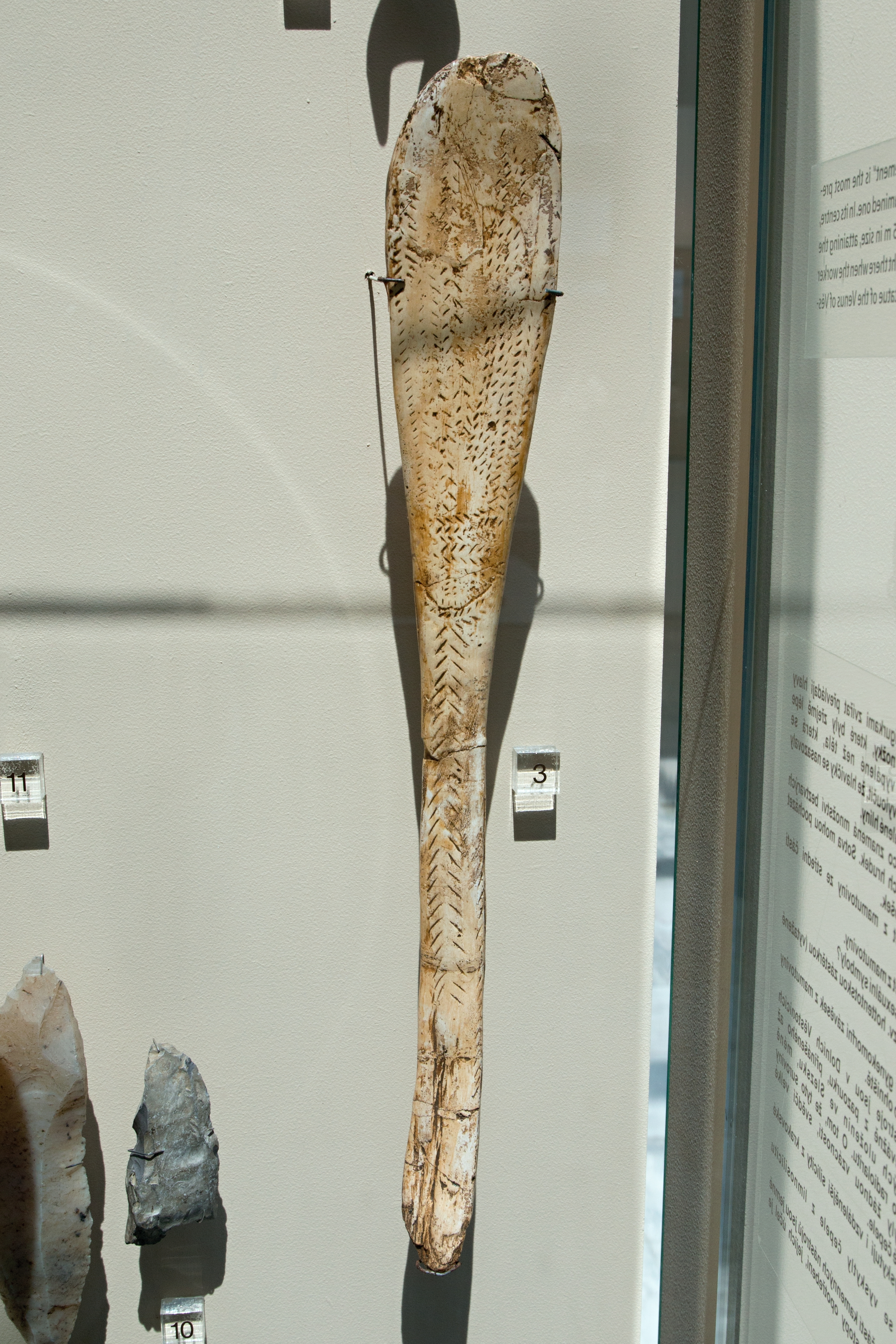
Engraved spoon, Dolni Vestonice

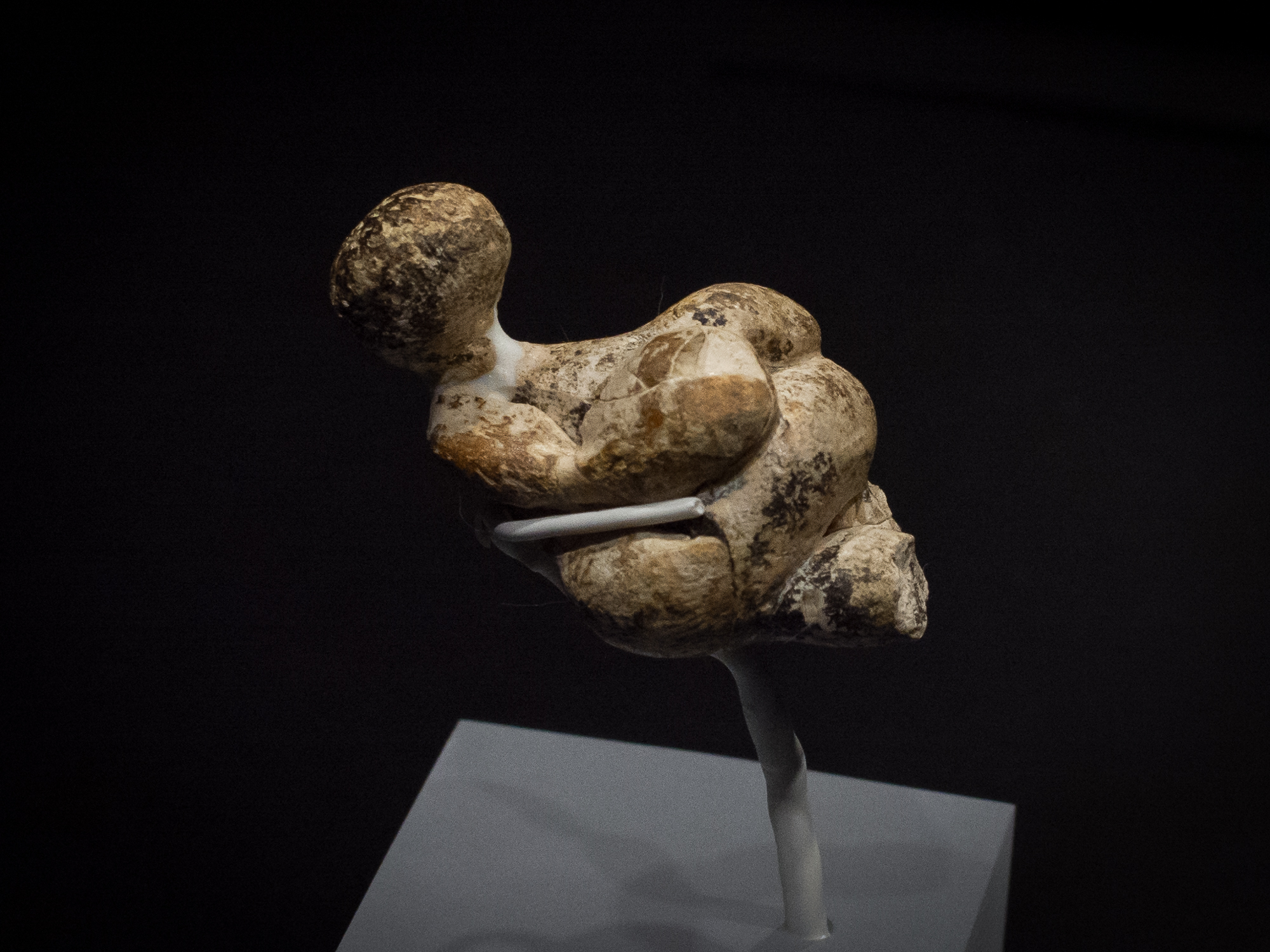
Venus figurine from Gagarino, Russia

== See also ==
Preceded by Aurignacian – Upper Paleolithic culture of Europe	Gravettian; 33,000–24,000 cal BP	Succeeded by Solutrean

- Art of the Upper Paleolithic – Oldest form of prehistoric art
- Aurignacian culture – Upper Paleolithic culture of Europe
- Earth's Children series – 1980–2011 series of books by Jean M. Auel
- Epigravettian – European Upper Paleolithic culture
- Haplogroup I-M170 – Human Y-chromosome DNA haplogroup
- Last Glacial Maximum – Circa 24,000–16,000 BCE; most recent era when ice sheets were at their greatest extent
- List of Stone Age art
- Montgaudier Cave
- Perigordian – Several related cultures of the Upper Paleolithic
- Solutrean – Archaeological industry of the European Upper Paleolithic
- Upper Paleolithic – Subdivision of the Paleolithic, or Old Stone Age
- Venus figurines – Prehistoric statuette depicting a woman
- Bayac, closest to the type-site of La Gravette

== Sources ==
- Fu, Qiaomei (2 May 2016). "The genetic history of Ice Age Europe". Nature. 534 (7606). Nature Research: 200–205. Bibcode:2016Natur.534..200F. doi:10.1038/nature17993. hdl:10211.3/198594. PMC 4943878. PMID 27135931.
