= Venus of Eliseevichi =

Venus figurine

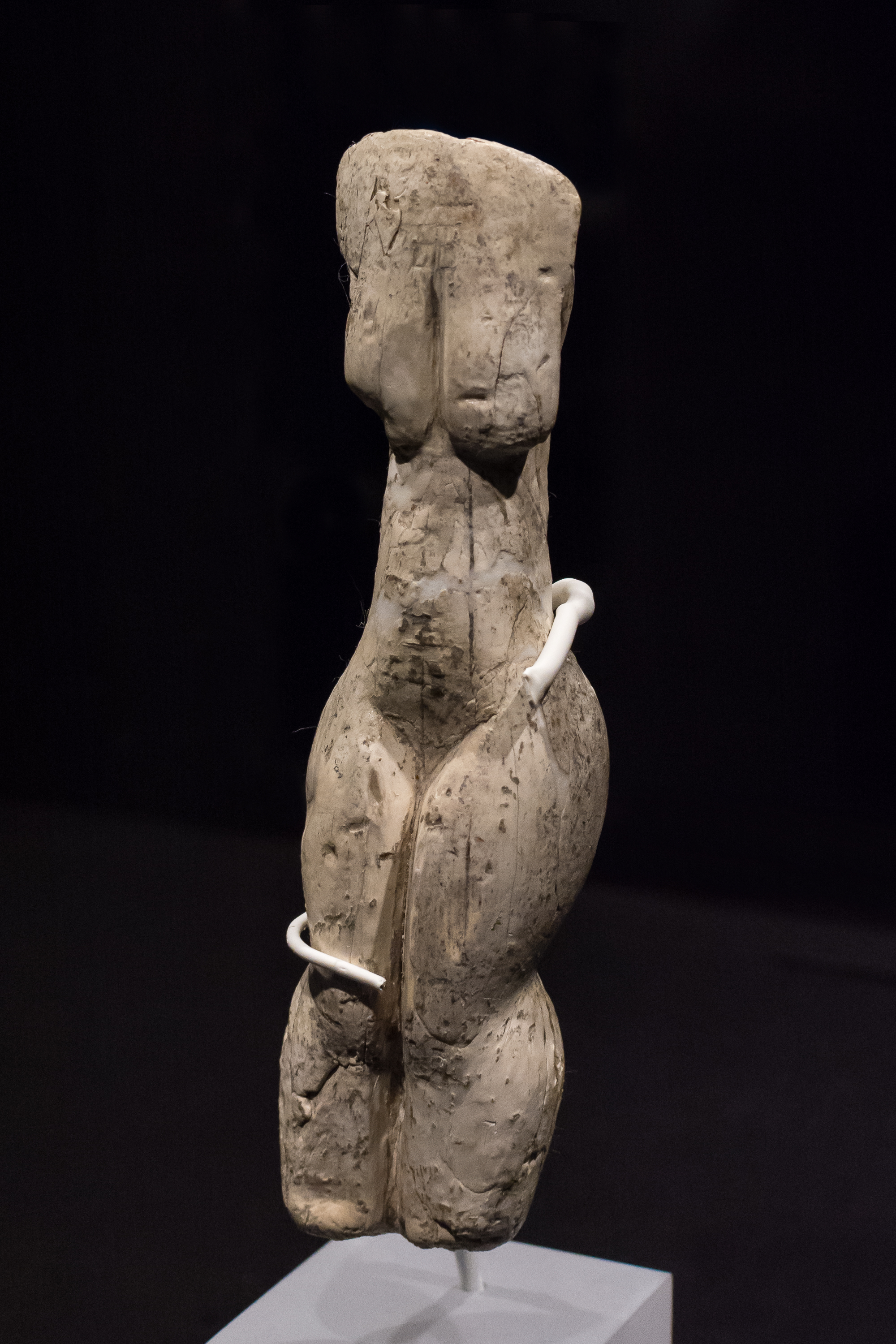
- Material: Ivory
- Height: 15 cm
- Created: 16,000 years
- Discovered: 1930; Bryansk, Russia
- Present location: Saint Petersburg, Russia

The Venus of Eliseevichi is a Venus figurine from the Epigravettian exhibited at the Hermitage Museum.

The figurine was discovered in 1930, near the Sudost River in the Bryansk region of Russia. It is 15 cm high and was carved from mammoth ivory. Remarkably, the figurine depicts a young woman, just like the Venus impudique.

Although the figurine is assigned to the 'Venus' category, the statuette does not appear to be stylistically similar to other Russian Paleolithic figurines (such as the Venus figurines of Kostenki or the Venus figurines of Gagarino).

== Literature ==
- Henri Delporte: L’image de la femme dans l’art préhistorique, Ed. Picard 1979.
