= Venus of Mauern =

Paleolithic figurine housed in Munich, Germany

Coordinates: 48°46′30″N 11°3′8″E

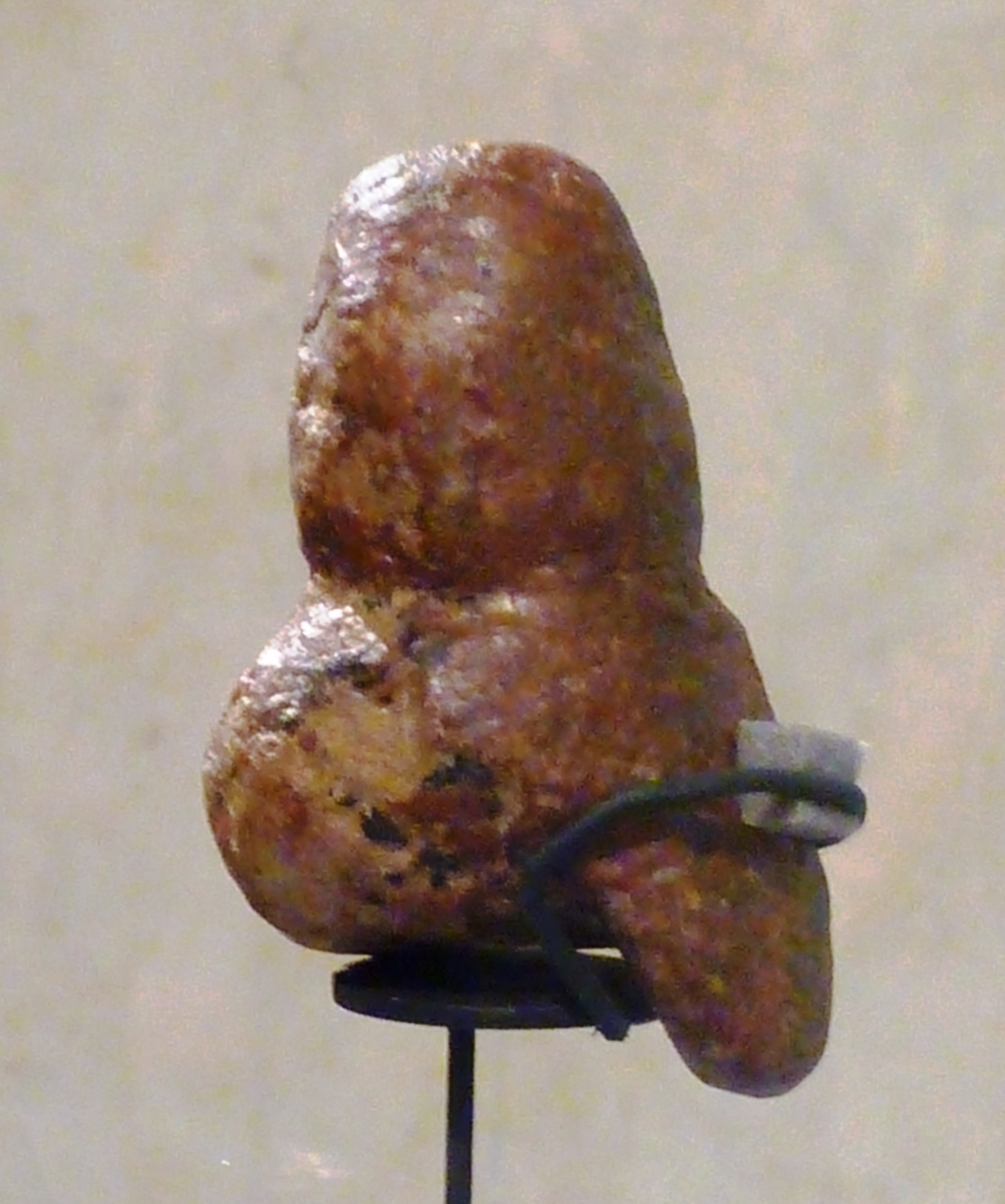
The Venus of Mauern

The Venus of Mauern (also: Rote von Mauern, "the red one of Mauern") is a Venus figurine from the Paleolithic era. The statuette stems from the Gravettian and is about 27,000 years old. The figurine consists of red painted limestone and was found in 1948 in Mauern (Rennertshofen). It is housed in the Archäologische Staatssammlung in Munich.

== History ==
The excavations were led by the prehistorian Lothar Zotz from the university of Erlangen in 1948/49. The amateur archeologist Christoff von Vojkffy found the figurine in the Weinberghöhlen ("vineyard caves") near Mauern at 24 August 1948. The figurine was found at the hill between cave 2 and 3.

== Description ==
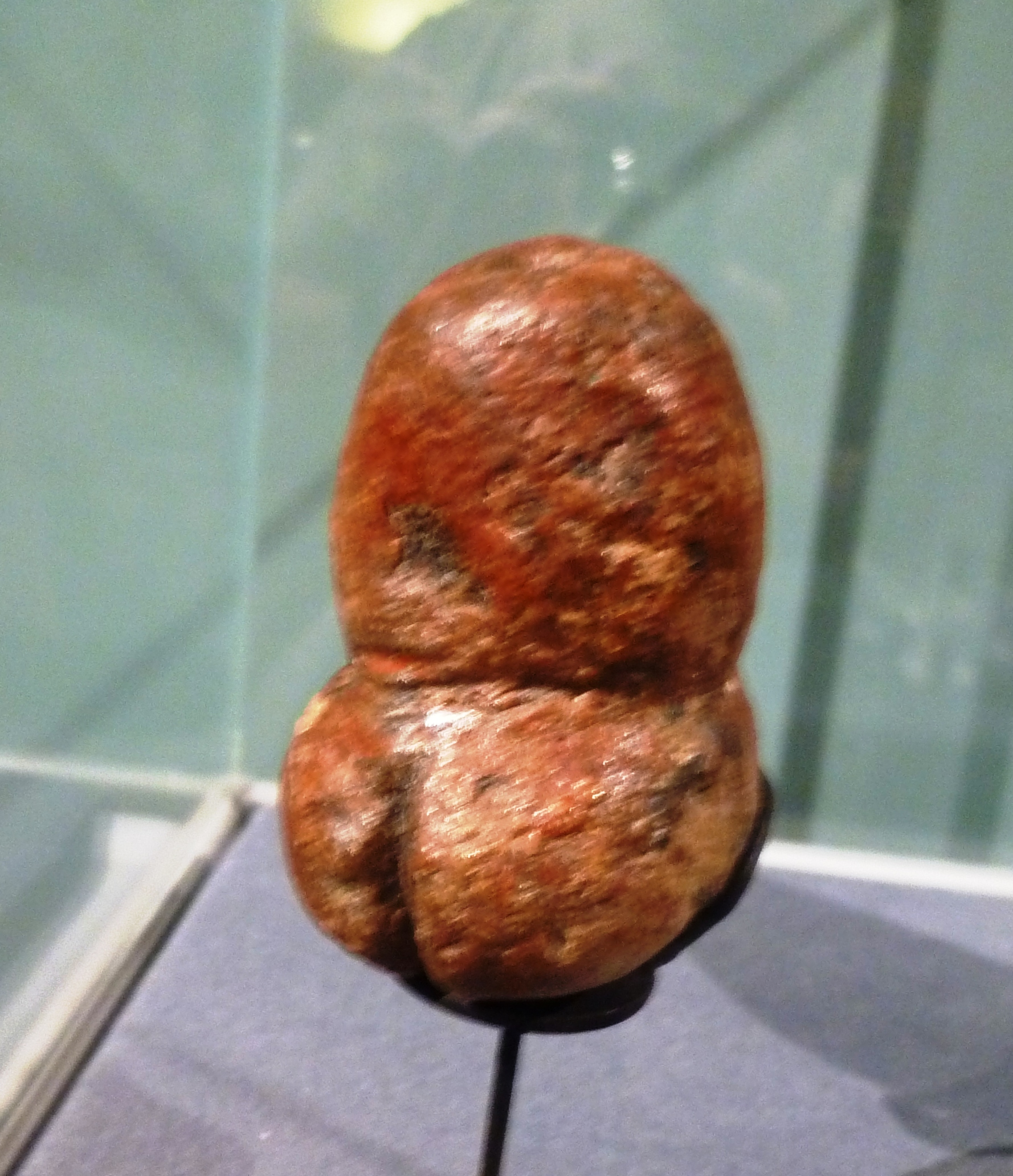
Venus of Mauern/'Die Rote von Mauern'

The figurine is 7.2 centimetres (2.8 in) tall, made of limestone and is covered with red ochre. The statuette can be interpreted in two ways: as a stylized depiction of a woman with large buttocks or as a penis with testicles. At the upper side is a deepening, which can be interpreted as the ending of the urethra. This kind of double-sexed depiction can also be found in several other figurines of the paleolithic era, among them sculptures from Dolni Vestonice, Gönnersdorf, Nebra, Mezin (Ukraine), Milandes, Oelknitz, Savignano, Trasimeno and Trou Magrite.

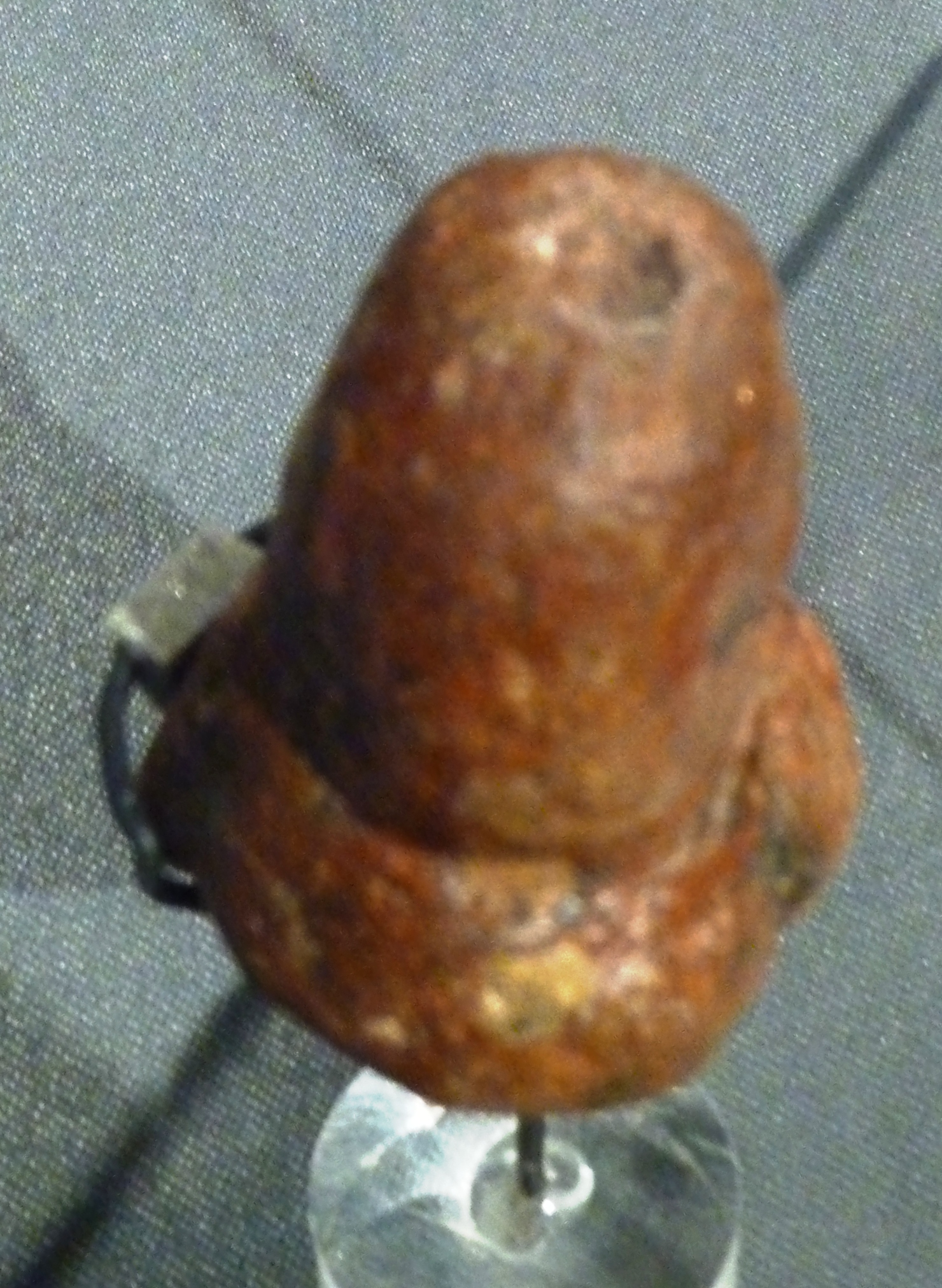
Deepening at the upper side of the figurine

== See also ==
- Paleolithic art
- Venus of Monruz
- Venus figurines of Gönnersdorf
- Venus of Willendorf
