= Venus of Waldstetten =

Ancient Venus statue

The Venus of Waldstetten is an approximately 15,000 year old Venus figurine made of quartzite. The find was apparently brought to the site by people. The figure is unprocessed in its basic form, but has engravings that were clearly carried out by humans. Therefore, it is interpreted as a female figure. It is 5.8 cm long with a maximum width of 1.9 cm; 2.5 cm thick and weighs 25.3 g. The site is located at Waldstetten in the Ostalbkreis on a terrain level between the Rems Valley and the Swabian strata landscape.

The excavator was the amateur archaeologist Adolf Regen. The Venus von Waldstetten is compared with the figurines of the Gönnersdorf design type, which were typical of the Magdalenian era. This type of female figure is named after the roughly the same old engraved depictions of female bodies on slate slabs from Gönnersdorf. The circumferential engraving in the neck area means that in addition to the interpretation as a female figure, an interpretation as a phallus representation is possible, analogous to the interpretation of the double gender of the so-called Red one of Mauern. The engraving on the "head" can also be seen as an aid when hanging the figure.

== Literature ==
- Adolf Regen, Wolfgang Naak, Stefan Wettengl, Simon Fröhle, Harald Floss: Eine Frauenfigur vom Typ Gönnersdorf aus der Magdalénien-Freilandfundstelle Waldstetten-Schlatt, Ostalbkreis, Baden-Württemberg. In: Harald Floss (Hrsg.): Das Magdalénien im Südwesten Deutschlands, im Elsass und in der Schweiz (Tübingen Publications in Prehistory), 2019. ISBN 978-3935751292
