= Venus figurines of Mal'ta =

Paleolithic figurines found in Siberia, Russia

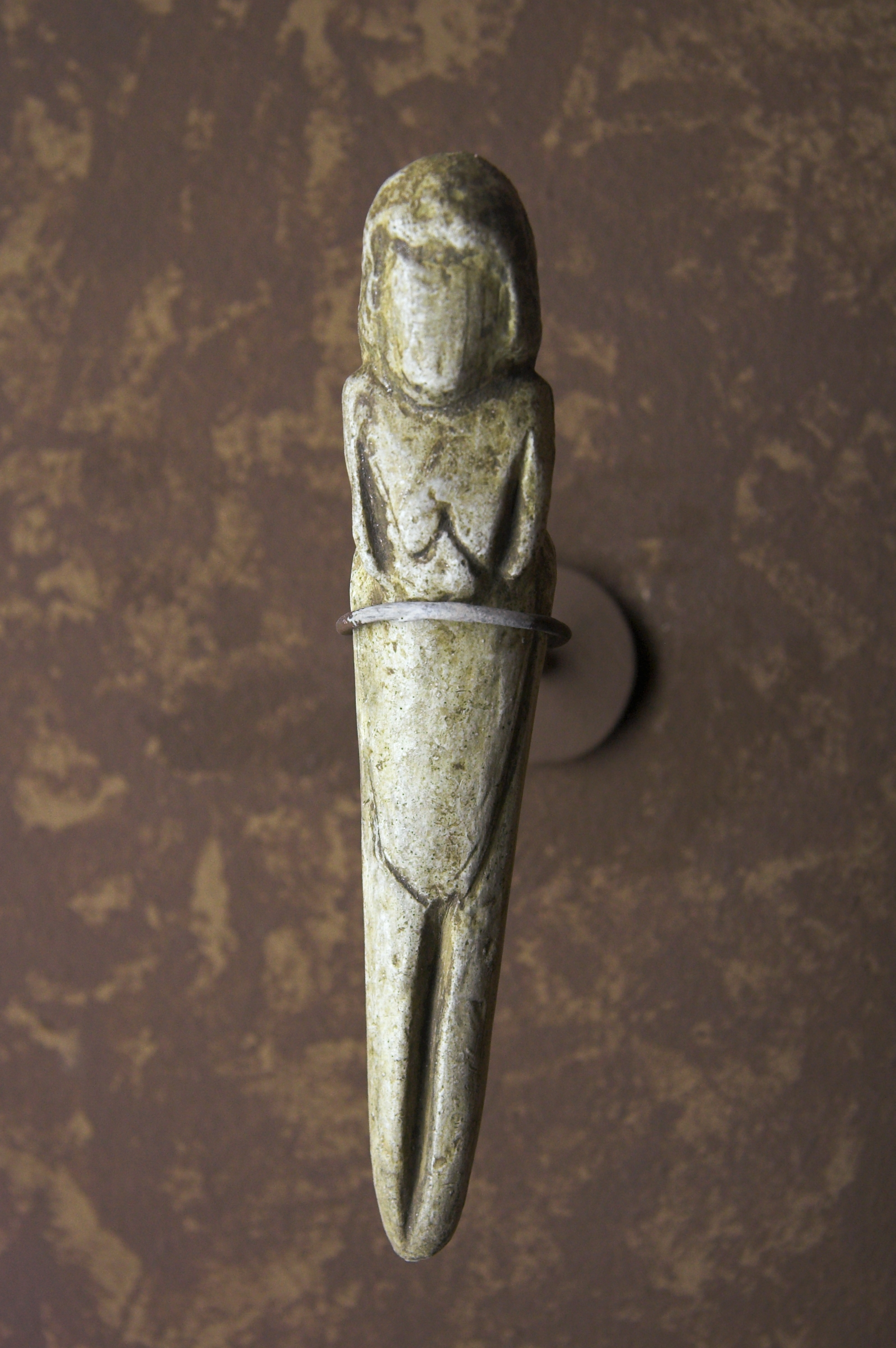
- A Venus figurine of Mal'ta (facsimile, Prague National Museum).
- Created: 21,000 BCE (23,000 BP)
- Discovered: Mal'ta, Southern Siberia
- Present location: Hermitage Museum

Location
- Location of Mal'ta, Southern Siberia Mal'ta (Russia)

The Venus figurines of Mal’ta (also: Malta) are several palaeolithic female figurines of the Mal'ta–Buret' culture, found in Siberia, Russia.

They consist most often of ivory. Delporte writes of 29 figurines altogether. They are about 23,000 years old and stem from the Gravettian. Most of these statuettes show stylized clothes. Quite often the face is depicted. They were discovered at Mal'ta, at the Angara River, near Lake Baikal in Irkutsk Oblast, Siberia by the archeologists Sergey Zamyatnin, Georgy Sosnovsky, and Mikhail Gerasimov.

These figurines are on display at the Hermitage Museum, Saint Petersburg.

== Discovery ==
Around 30 female statuettes of varying shapes were discovered at Mal'ta, at the Angara River, and near Lake Baikal in Irkutsk Oblast in Siberia. The wide variety of forms, combined with the realism of the sculptures and the lack of repetitiveness in detail, are definite signs of developed, albeit early, art.

Until the Mal’ta find, Venus figurines were previously found only in Europe. Carved from the tusk ivory of a mammoth, these images were typically highly stylized and often involved embellished and disproportionate characteristics (typically the breasts or buttocks).

== Features ==
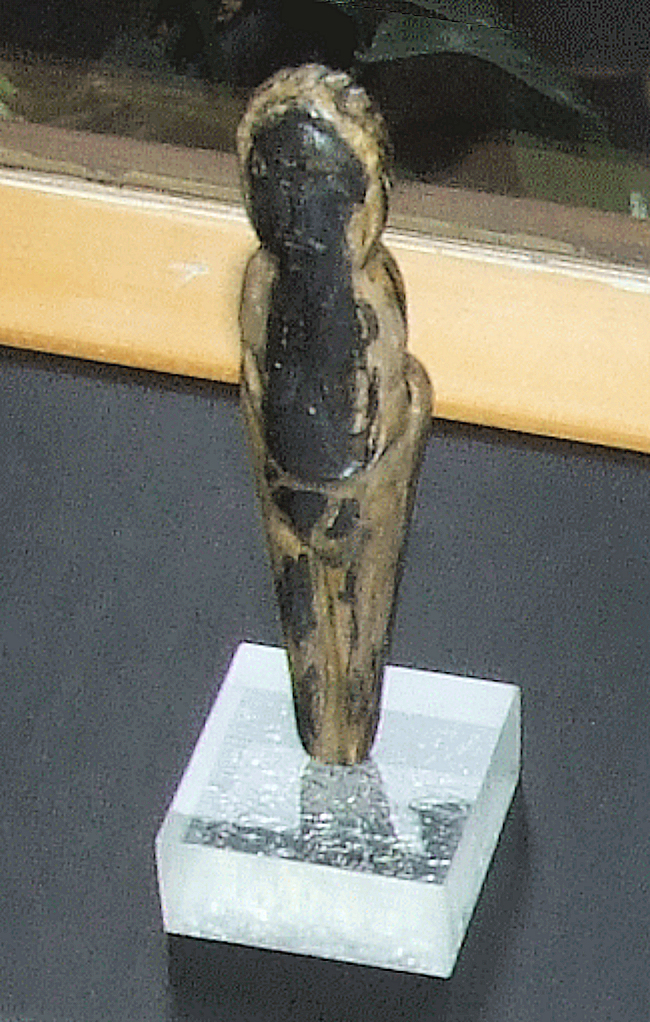
A facsimile of one of the Mal'ta Venus figurines on display in Prague's National Museum.

At first glance what is obvious is that the Mal'ta Venus figurines are of two types: full-figured women with exaggerated forms, and women with a thin, delicate form. Some of the figures are nude while others have etchings that seem to indicate fur or clothing. Conversely, unlike those found in Europe, some of the Venus figurines from Mal’ta were sculpted with faces. Most of the figurines were tapered at the bottom, and it is believed that this was done so they could have been stuck into the ground or placed upright some other way. Placed upright they could have symbolized the spirits of the dead, akin to "spirit dolls" used nearly world-wide, including Siberia, among contemporary people.

== Style ==
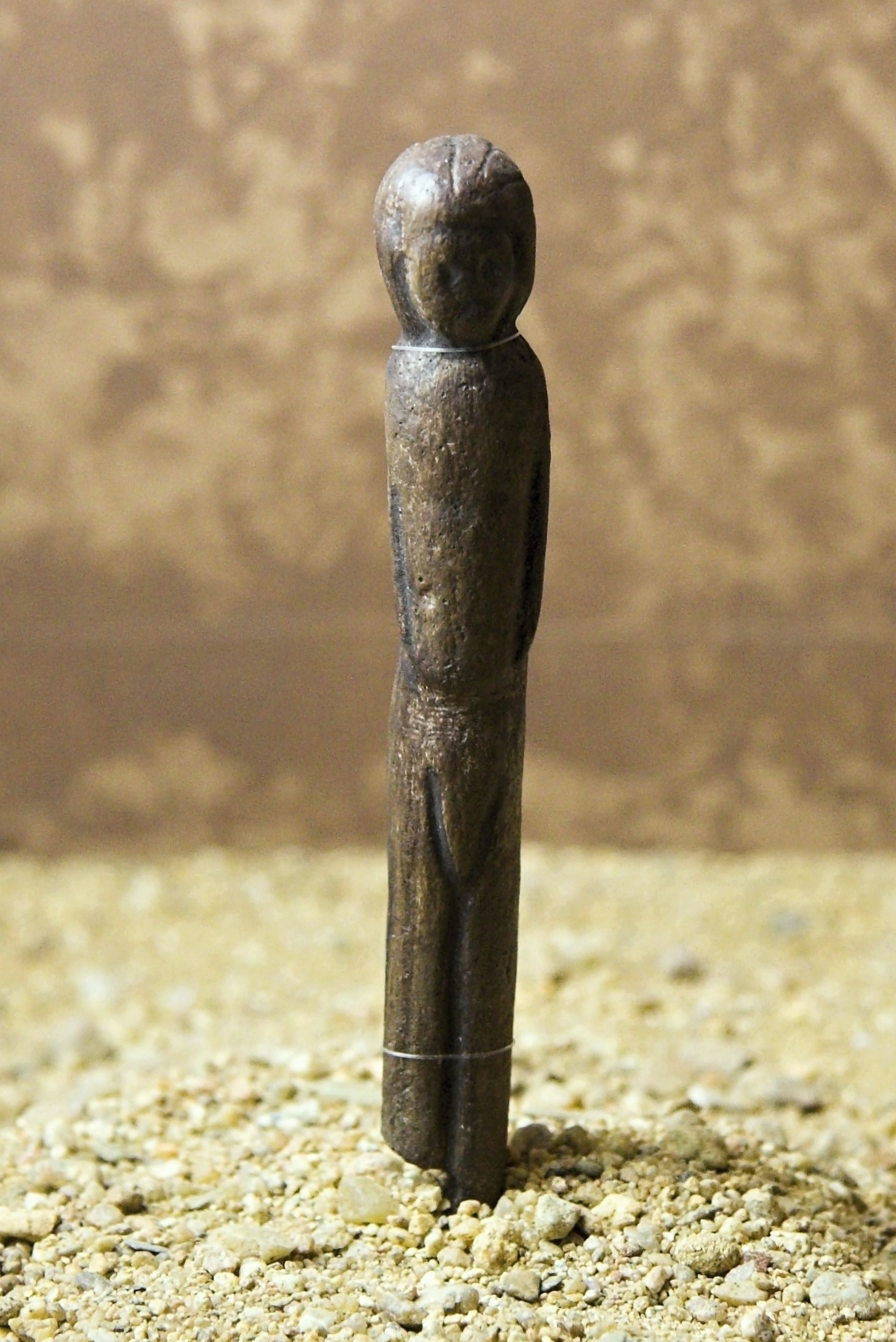
Another Venus of Mal'ta.

The suggested similarity between Mal'ta and Upper Paleolithic civilizations of Western and Eastern Europe coincides with a long-held belief that the ancient people of Mal'ta were related to the Paleolithic societies of Europe. These similarities can be established by their tools, dwelling structures, and art. These commonalities draw into question the origin of Upper Paleolithic Siberian people, and whether the migrating peoples originated from Southeastern Asia or quite possibly from Europe. On the other hand, one can argue that as a group the Mal'ta Venus figures are rather different from the female figurines of Western and Central Europe. For example, none of the Siberian specimens indicates abdominal enlargement as main European examples do, and as breasts are often lacking, few offer clear enough evidence of gender to define them as female. More conclusively, nearly half of them show some facial details (flat nose, deep-set narrow eyes, and a mouth), something which is lacking on the so-called Venus figures of Europe. Many of them also appear to wear clothes, complete with hoods (clearly visible in the nearby Venus of Buret'), something European Venuses are lacking. The closest European site for Venus figurines would be Kostyonki, and research is being conducted to try to find connections with Mal'ta.

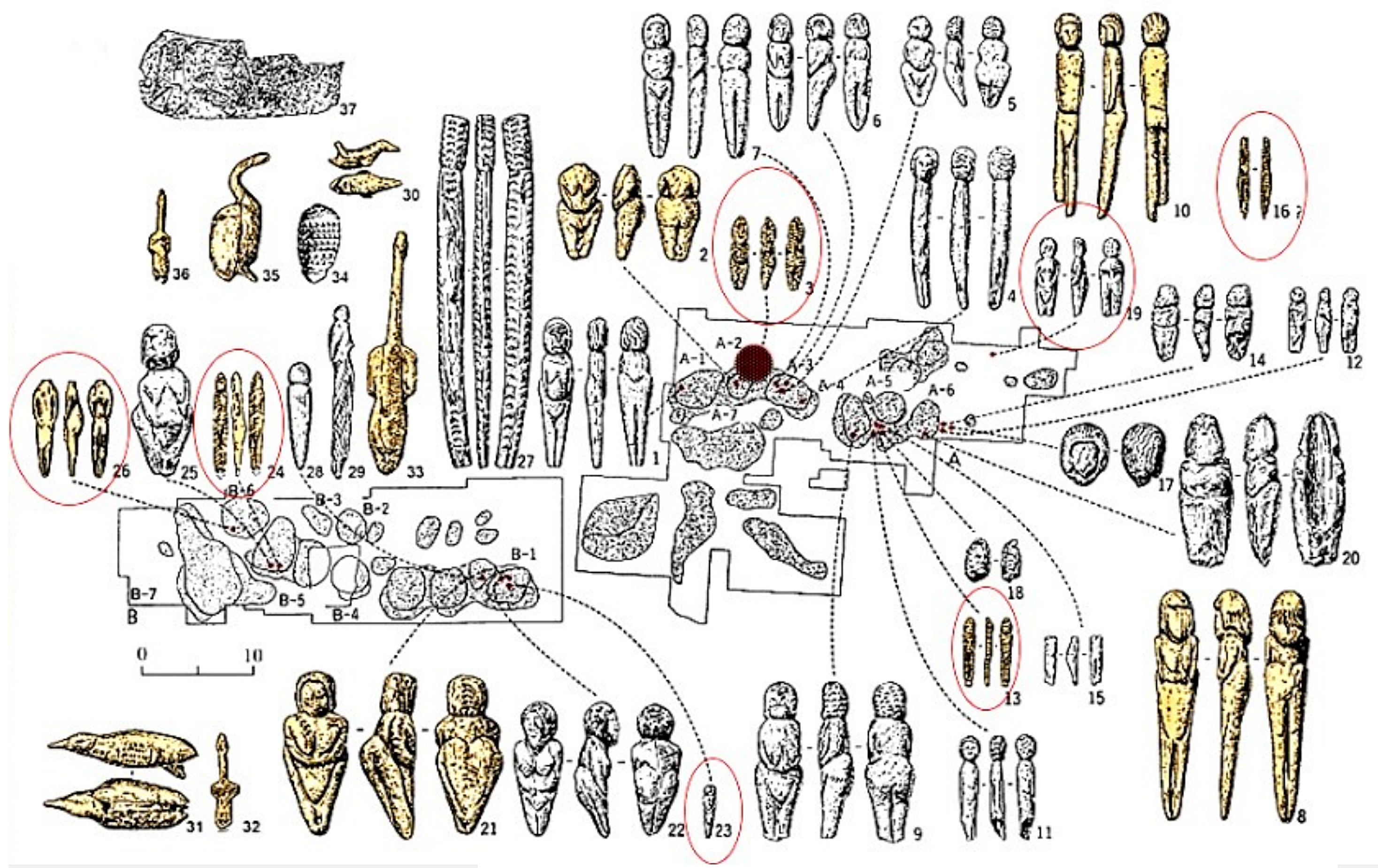
Mal'ta burials, artifacts and statuettes.

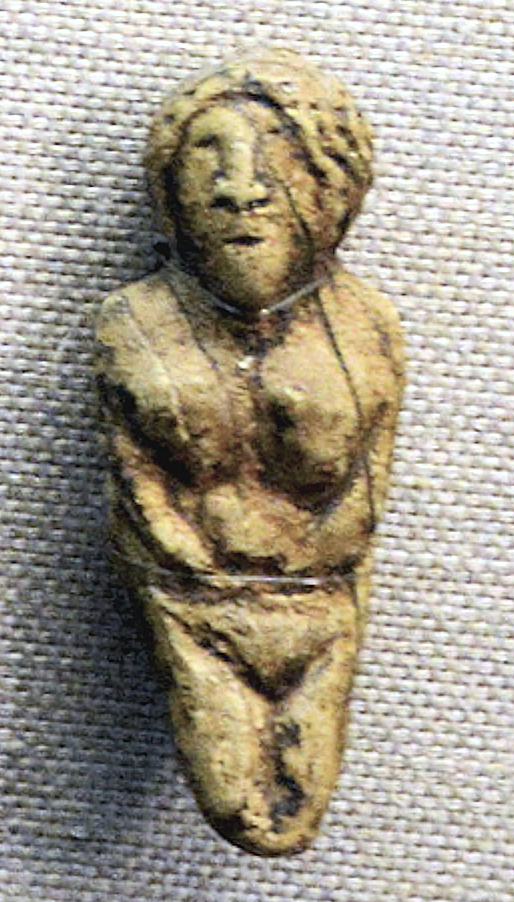
Statuette with facial features.

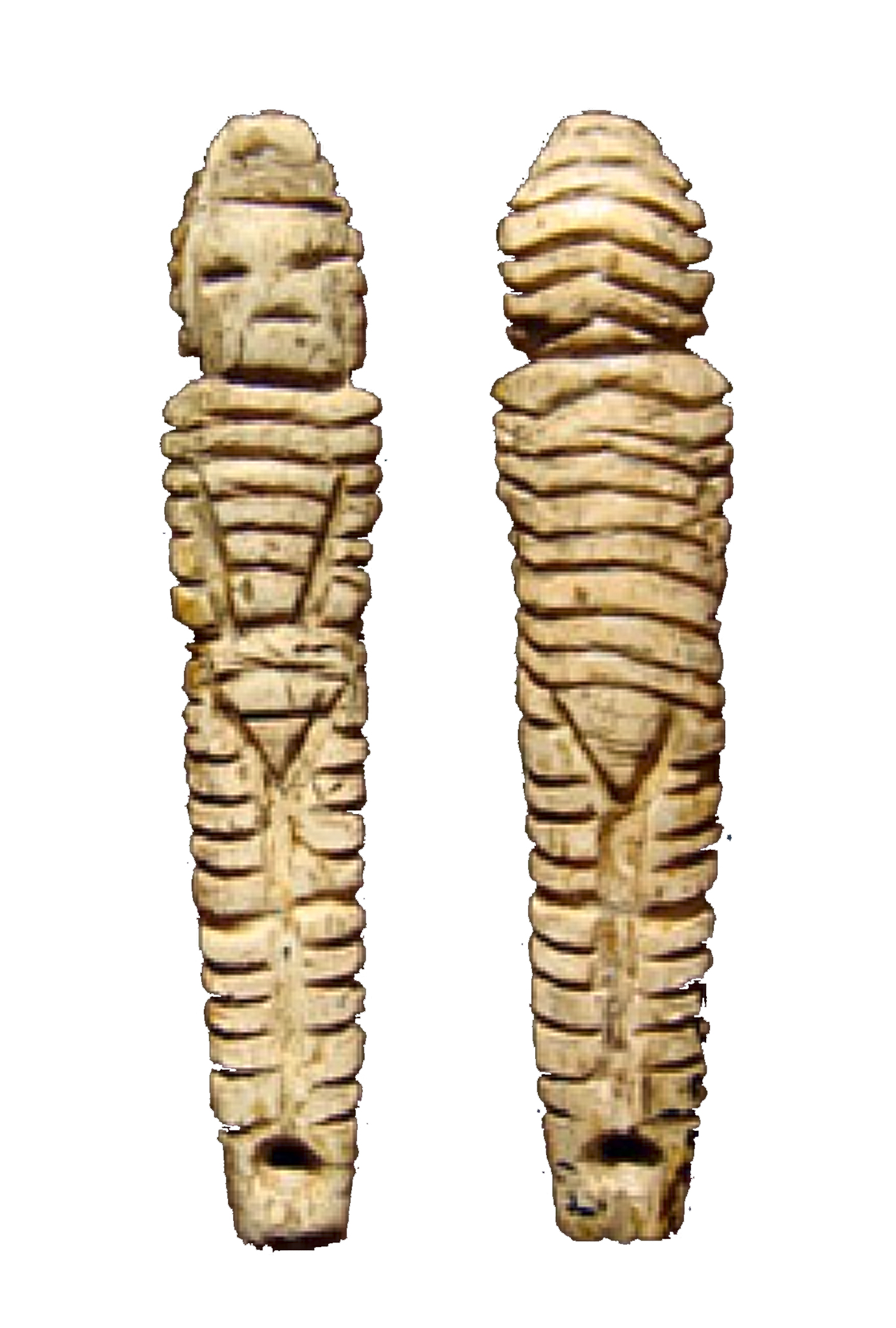
Statuette with hooded, decorated, overall.

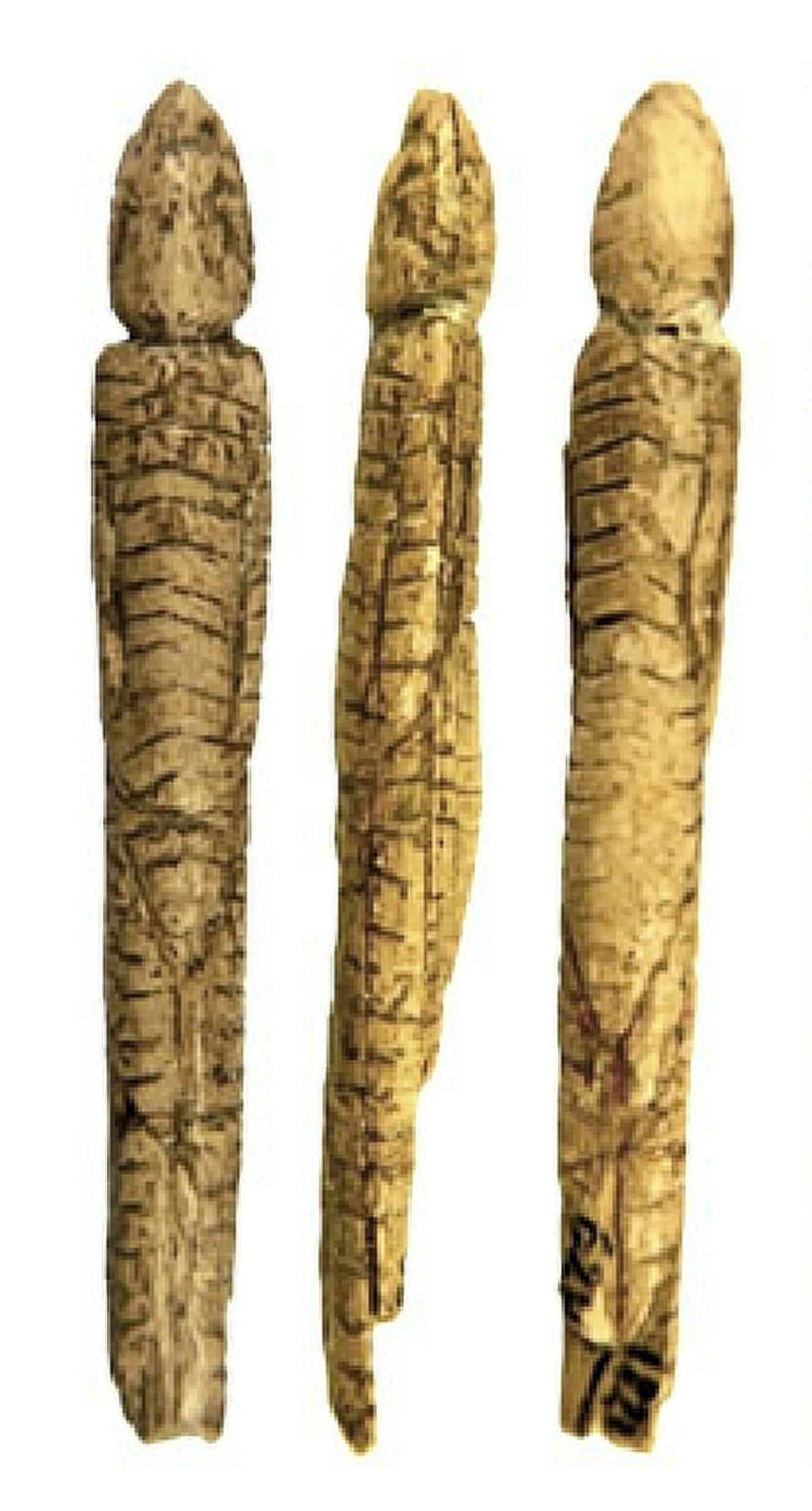
Elongated figurine with hooded, decorated, overall and traces of paint.

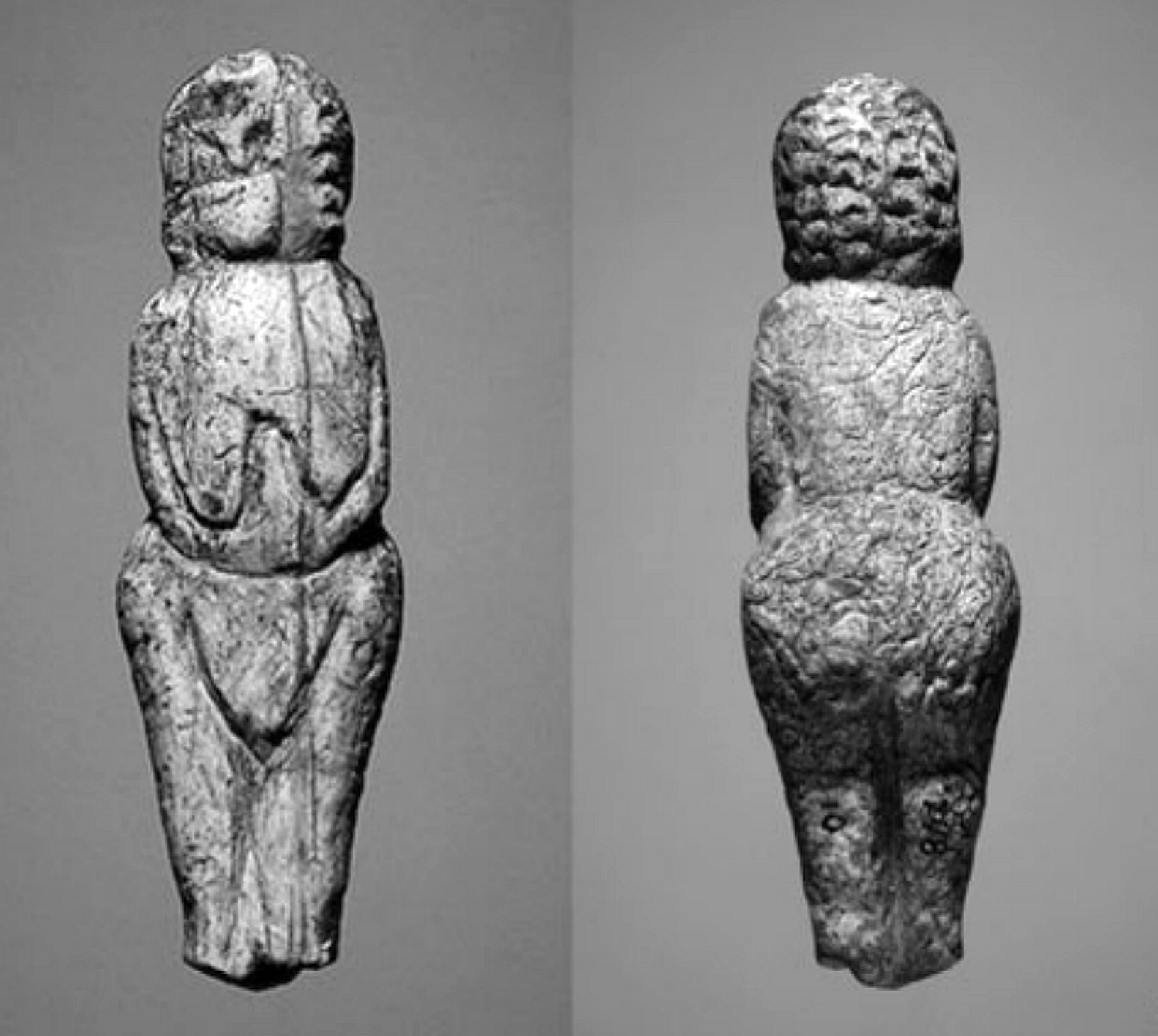
Mal’ta Venus (Hermitage, No. 370-748).

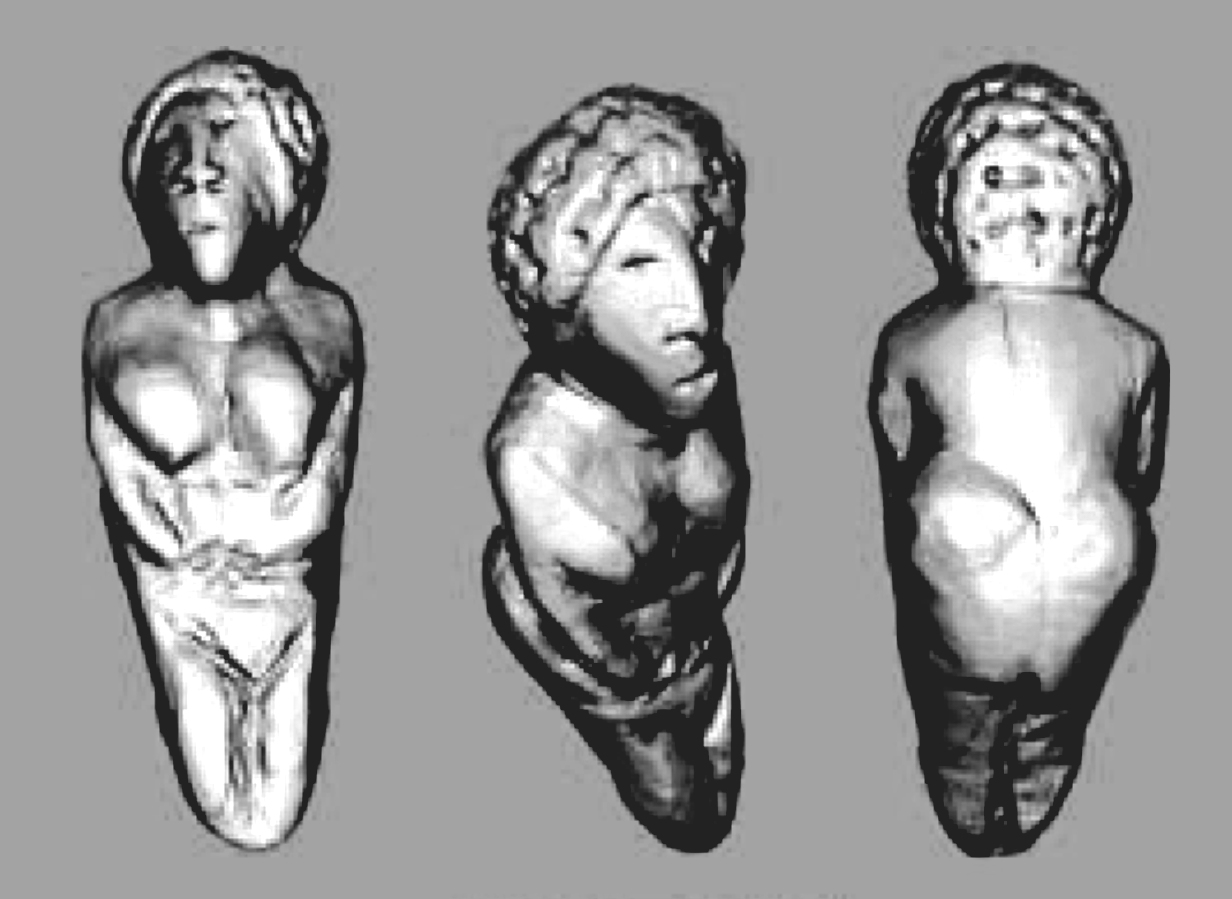
Mal'ta statuette 3D modelling

== See also ==
- Art of the Upper Paleolithic
- List of Stone Age art
- Venus figurines
- Mal'ta–Buret' culture
- Venus of Buret'
- Venus figurines of Gönnersdorf
- Venus of Hohle Fels
- Venus of Willendorf
- Venus of Lespugue
- Central Asian art

== Literature ==
- Cohen, Claudine (2003). La femme des origines : images de la femme dans la préhistoire occidentale. Belin-Herscher. ISBN 978-2733503362.
- Delporte, Henri (1979). L’image de la femme dans l’art préhistorique. Paris.
- Gerasimov, Michail M. (1964). The Paleolithic site of Malta: excavations of 1956–1958. In E.N. Michael (ed.): The Archaeology and Geomorphology of Northern Asia. No. 5, S. 3–32, Arctic Institute of North America, University of Toronto (Translations from Russian Sources).
- Jelinek, Jan: Das grosse Bilderlexikon des Menschen in der Vorzeit. Bertelsmann-Lexikon-Verlag, Gütersloh 1972. (Picture of Venus figurines from Malta: p. 315, 334, 377, 385, 393, 394.)
