= Venus figurine =

Prehistoric statuette depicting a woman

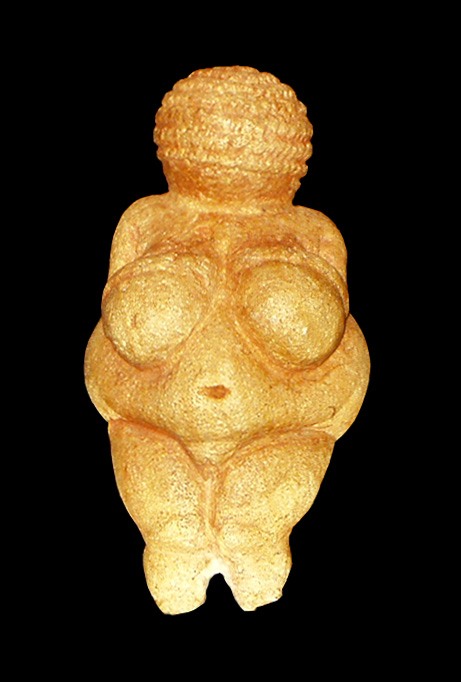
Venus of Willendorf

A Venus figurine is any Upper Palaeolithic statue portraying a woman, usually carved in the round. Most have been unearthed in Europe, but others have been found as far away as Siberia and distributed across much of Eurasia.

Most date from the Gravettian period (26,000–21,000 years ago). However, findings are not limited to this period; for example, the Venus of Hohle Fels dates back at least 35,000 years to the Aurignacian period, the Venus of Monruz dates back about 11,000 years to the Magdalenian period, and the Çatalhöyük figurine dates back about 8000 years to the Neolithic. Such figurines were carved from soft stone (such as steatite, calcite, or limestone), bone, or ivory; or alternatively formed from clay and fired. The latter are among the oldest ceramics known to historians. In total, over 200 such figurines are known; virtually all of modest size, between about 3 and 40 cm (1.2 and 15.7 in) in height. These figurines are recognised as some of the earliest works of prehistoric art.

Most have wide hips and legs that taper to a point. Arms and feet are often absent, and the head is usually small and faceless. Various figurines exaggerate the abdomen, hips, breasts, thighs, or vulva, although many found examples do not reflect these typical characteristics. Depictions of hairstyles can be detailed, and clothing or tattoos may be indicated.

The original cultural meaning and purpose of these artefacts is not known. It has frequently been suggested that they may have served a ritual or symbolic function. There are widely varying and speculative interpretations of their use or meaning: they have been seen as religious figures, an expression of health and fertility, grandmother goddesses, or as self-depictions by female artists.

== History of discovery ==
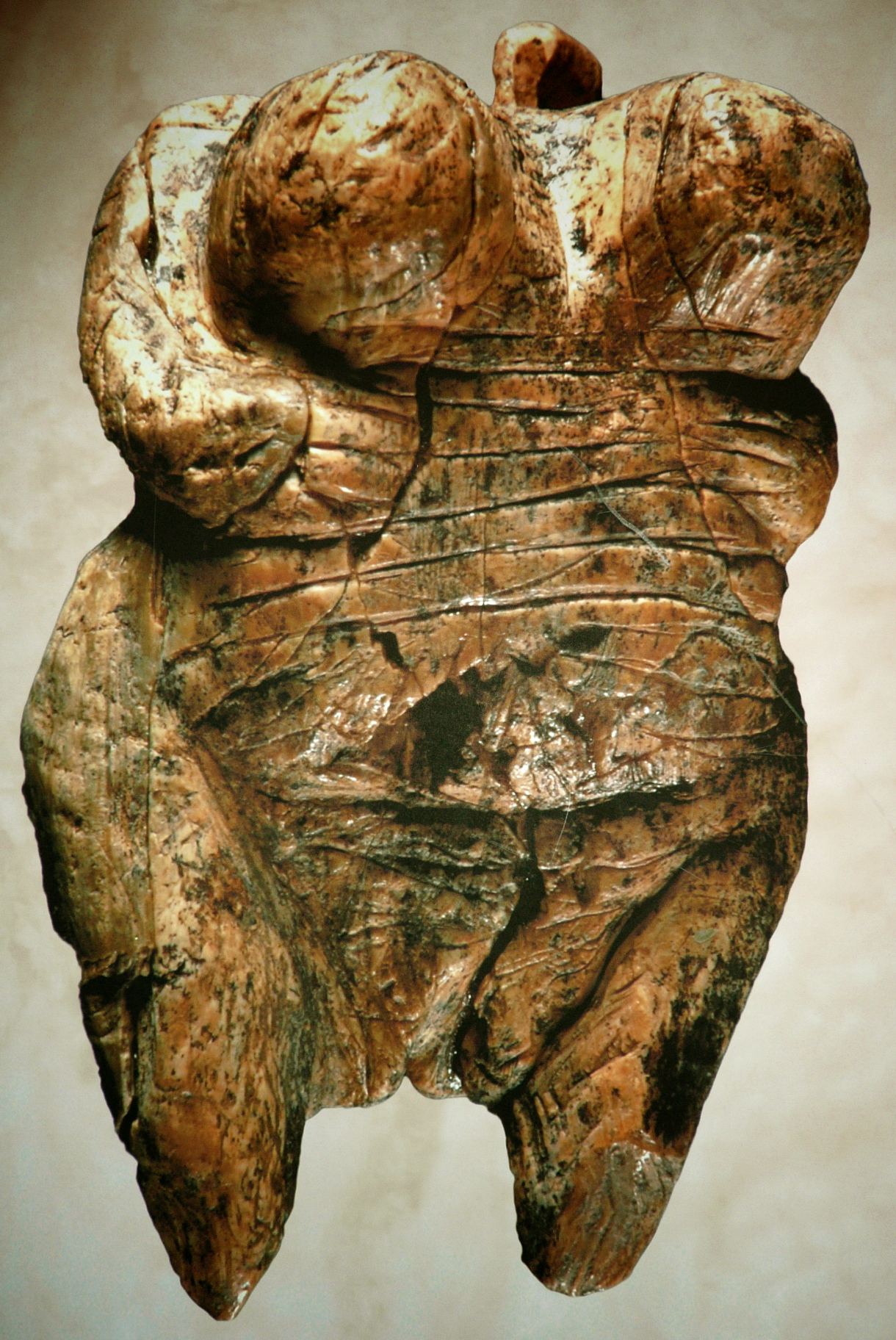
Venus of Hohle Fels, the earliest known Venus figurine

The Vénus impudique, which was the figurine that gave the whole category its name, was the first Palaeolithic sculptural representation of a woman to be discovered in modern times. It was found in 1864 by Paul Hurault, 8th Marquis de Vibraye at Laugerie-Basse in the Vézère valley. This valley is one of the many important Stone Age sites in and around the commune of Les Eyzies-de-Tayac-Sireuil in Dordogne, southwestern France. The figurines were mostly discovered in settlement contexts, both in open-air sites and caves. The Magdalenian Venus from Laugerie-Basse is headless, footless, armless, and displays a strongly emphasised vulva.

Four years later, Salomon Reinach published an article about a group of soapstone figurines from the caves of Balzi Rossi. The famous Venus of Willendorf was excavated in 1908 from a loess deposit in the Danube valley located in Austria. Since then, hundreds of similar figurines have been discovered from the Pyrenees Mountains to the plains of Siberia.

In September 2008, archaeologists from the University of Tübingen discovered a 6 cm (2.4 in) figurine carved from a mammoth's tusk. This figurine was later called the Venus of Hohle Fels and can be dated to at least 35,000 years ago. It represents the earliest known sculpture of this type and the earliest known work of figurative art.

== Name ==
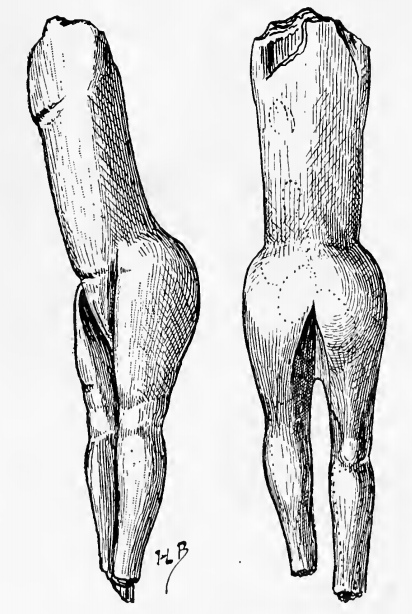
Vénus impudique, 1907 drawing

Upper Palaeolithic female figurines are collectively described as "Venus figurines" in reference to the Roman goddess of beauty Venus. The name was first used in the mid-nineteenth century by the Marquis de Vibraye, who discovered an ivory figurine and named it La Vénus impudique or Venus Impudica ("immodest Venus"). The Marquis then contrasted the ivory figurine to the Aphrodite of Knidos, a Greco-Roman sculpture depicting Venus covering her naked body with her hands. In the early 20th century, the general belief among scholars was that the figurines represent an ancient ideal of beauty. Since their discovery, considerable diversity in opinion amongst archaeologists and in palaeoanthropological literature has arisen as to the function and significance of the figures. Most scholars that have differing opinions on the purpose of the figurines, such as anthropologist Randall White, also disapprove of the "Venus" name as a result.

The use of the name is metaphorical as there is no link between the ancient figurines and the Roman goddess Venus; although they have been interpreted as representations of a primordial female goddess. This perception is said to have derived from the fact that attention is directed to certain features common to most of the figurines, in particular emotionally charged primary and secondary sexual characteristics such as the breasts, stomachs and buttocks. The term has been criticised for being a reflection of modern Western ideas rather than reflecting the beliefs of the sculptures' original owners, but the original names are unknown as well, so the term Venus has persisted.

Like many prehistoric artefacts, the exact cultural meaning of these figures may never be known. Archaeologists speculate, however, that they may be symbolic of security and success, fertility, or a mother goddess. The female figures are a part of Upper Palaeolithic art, specifically the category of Palaeolithic art known as portable art.

== Figure details ==
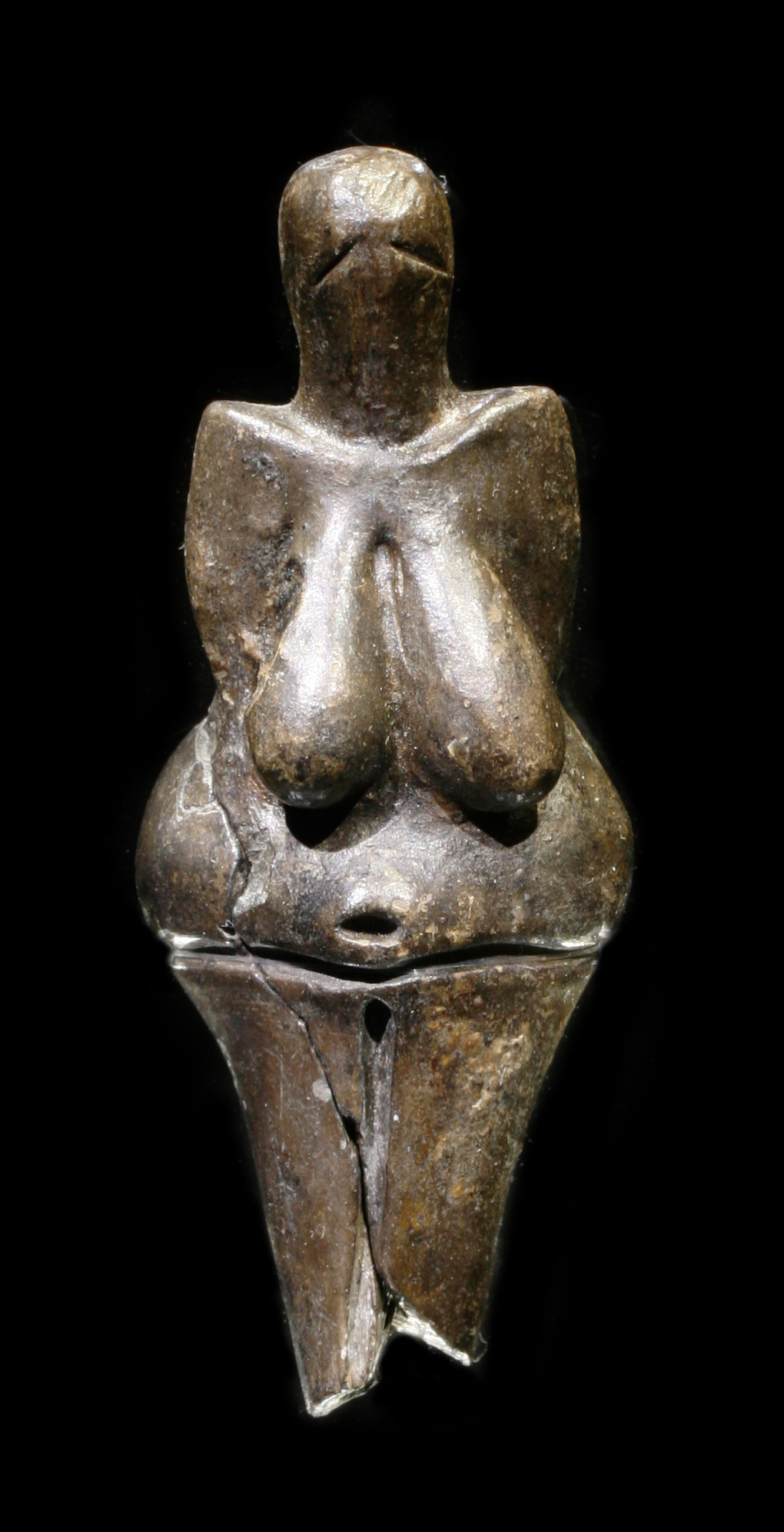
Venus of Dolní Věstonice, the earliest discovered use of ceramics (29,000 – 25,000 BCE)

The majority of Venus figurines are depictions of women, and follow artistic conventions of the times. Most of the figurines display the same body shape with the widest point at the abdomen and the female reproductive organs exaggerated. Oftentimes other details, such as the head and limbs, are neglected or absent which leads the figure to be abstracted to the point of simplicity. The heads are often of relatively small size and devoid of detail. Some may represent pregnant women, while others show no indication of pregnancy.

The Venus of Willendorf and the Venus of Laussel (a rock relief rather than a figurine) bear traces of having been externally covered in red ochre. The significance of this is not clear, but is traditionally assumed to be religious or ritual in nature. Some human bodies from the Palaeolithic era are found similarly covered, so it is assumed this colour had a significant meaning in their culture even though we do not know what.

All generally accepted Palaeolithic female figurines are from the Upper Palaeolithic. Although they were originally mostly considered part of the Aurignacian culture, the majority are now associated with the Gravettian and Solutrean cultures. In these periods, the more rotund figurines are predominant. Within the Magdalenian cultures, the forms become finer with more detail and the styling of said figures started to become similar within areas of close contact.

== Interpretation ==
Despite being thought as one of the most 'fertile sources of debate in all of archaeology', Venus figurines appear to be relatively understudied as a whole. A consequence of this is that they are subject to generalised stereotypes that minimize morphological variation and differing contexts. Nevertheless, there have been many differing interpretations of the figurines since their discovery.

McCoid and McDermott suggested that because of the way these figures are depicted, such as the large breasts and lack of feet and faces, these statues were made by women looking at their own bodies. They state that women during the period would not have had access to mirrors to maintain accurate proportions or depict the faces or heads of the figurines. The theory remains difficult to prove or disprove, and Michael S. Bisson suggested that alternatives, such as puddles, could have been used as mirrors.

It has also been suggested that the size and shape of the figures makes them suitable for holding through childbirth.

It has been suggested that they may be a sign of an earlier prevalence of steatopygia, now associated principally to women of certain African or Andamanese ancestry. However the Venuses do not qualify as steatopygian, since they exhibit an angle of approximately 120 degrees between the back and the buttocks, while steatopygia is diagnosed by modern medical standards at an angle of about 90 degrees only.

Another modern interpretation, providing an explanation for visible weight variety amongst the figurines, comes from Johnson et al. Here, they argue that differences in the statues can be said to relate to human adaption to climate change. This is because figurines that are seen to be heavier or pregnant originate to the earlier art from 38,000 to 14,000 BP - a period where nutritional stress arose as a result of falling temperatures. Accordingly, they found a correlation between an increase in distance from glacial fronts and a decrease in obesity of the figurines. This was justified as survival and reproduction, in glacial, colder areas, required sufficient nutrition and, consequently, over-nourished woman may have been seen as the ideal of beauty in these areas.

In "The Mythology of Venus Ancient Calendars and Archaeoastronomy," Helen Benigni argues that the consistency in design of these featureless, large-breasted, often pregnant figures throughout a wide region and over a long period of time suggests they represent an archetype of a female Supreme Creator. Neolithic, Bronze Age, and Iron Age inhabitants likely connected women as creators innately tied to the cycles of nature.

== Later female figurines and continuity ==
Neolithic fertility figurines

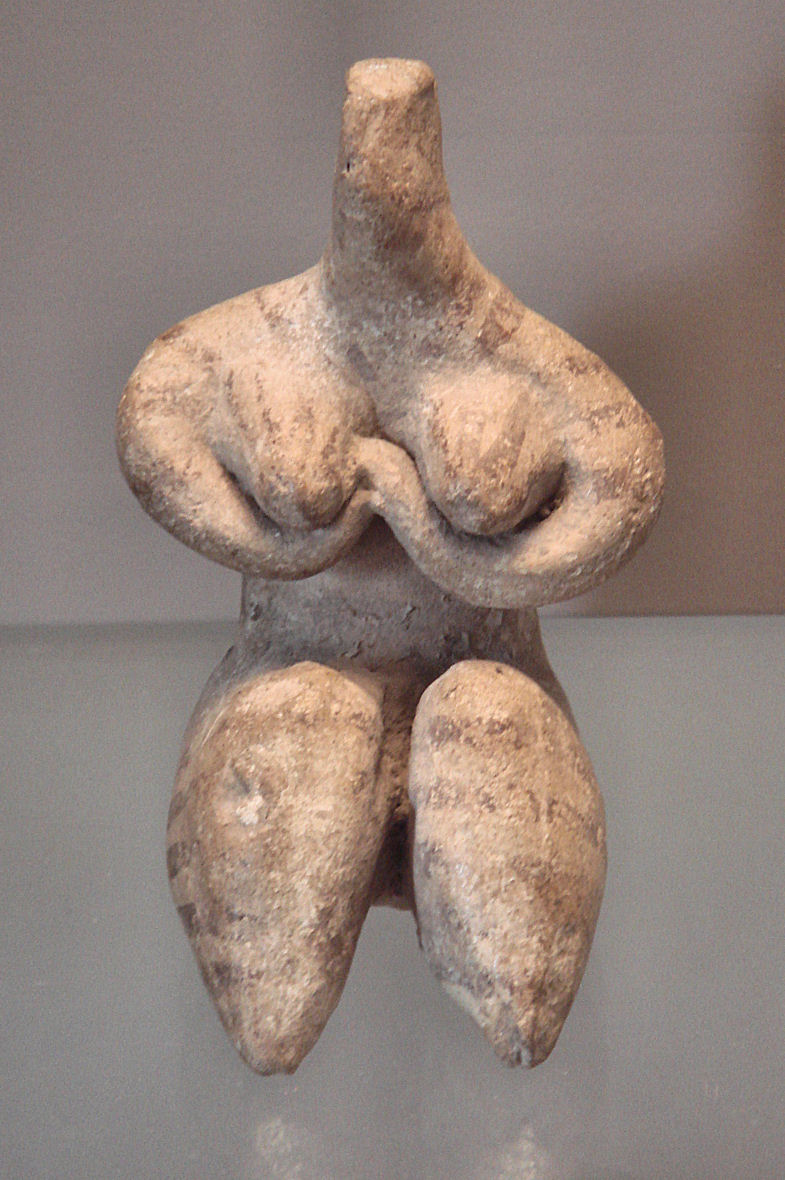
Fertility figurine of the Halaf culture, Mesopotamia, 6000-5100 BCE. Louvre.

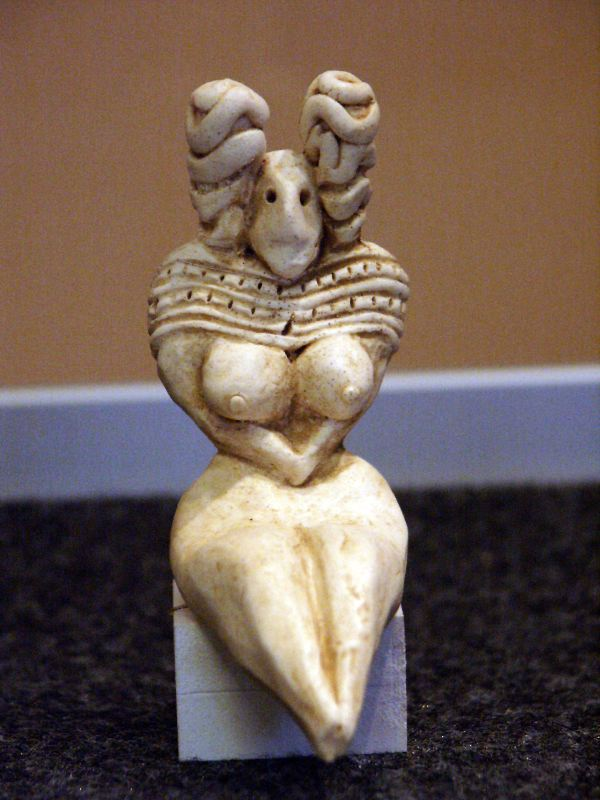
Fertility figurine from Mehrgarh, Indus Valley, c. 3000 BCE.

All part of the Neolithic "Venus figurines" tradition, the abundant breasts and hips of these figurines suggest links to fertility and procreation.

Some scholars suggest a direct continuity between Palaeolithic female figurines and later examples of female depictions from the Neolithic or Bronze Age.

A female figurine which has "no practical use and is portable" and has the common elements of a Venus figurine (a strong accent or exaggeration of female sex-linked traits, and the lack of complete lower limbs) may be considered to be a Venus figurine, even if archaeological evidence suggests it was produced after the main Palaeolithic period. Some figurines matching this definition originate from the Neolithic era and into the Bronze Age. The period and location in which a figurine was produced helps guide archaeologists to reach conclusions as to whether the art piece found can be defined as a Venus figurine or not. For example, ceramic figurines from the late ceramic Neolithic may be accepted as Venus figurines, while stone figurines from later periods are not. This is a matter of ongoing debate given the strong similarity between many figurines from the Palaeolithic, Neolithic and beyond. A reworked endocast of a brachiopod from around 6,000 BCE in Norway has been identified as a late Venus figurine.

This means that a given female figurine may or may not be classified as a Venus figure by any given archaeologist, regardless of its date, though most archaeologists disqualify figurines which date later than the Palaeolithic, even though their purpose could have been the same.

The island of Sardinia, west of Italy, had comparable figures, of which the most famous is called the Venus of Macomer. These statuettes, which date from the Neolithic period, share stylistic and iconographic similarities with the Upper Paleolithic Venus figurines found elsewhere.

== Notable figurines ==
Name	Age (approx.)	Location of discovery	Material	Year of discovery
Venus of Tan-Tan (disputed)	300,000–500,000	Tan-Tan, Morocco	Quartzite	1999
Venus of Berekhat Ram (disputed)	230,000–280,000	Lake Ram, Golan Heights	Scoria	1981
Venus of Hohle Fels	35,000–40,000	Swabian Alb, Germany	mammoth ivory	2008
Venus of Galgenberg	30,000	Lower Austria	serpentine rock	1988
Venus of Dolní Věstonice	27,000–31,000	Moravia, Czech Republic	ceramic	1925
Venus of Mauern	27,000	Mauern, Germany	limestone	1948
Venus of Laussel	25,000	Southern France	limestone, but a relief	1911
Venus of Lespugue	24,000–26,000	French Pyrenees	ivory	1922
Venus of Willendorf	24,000–26,000	Lower Austria	limestone	1908
Venus of Brassempouy	23,000–25,000	Brassempouy, France	ivory	1892
Venus of Moravany	23,000	Moravany nad Váhom, Slovakia	mammoth ivory	1930
Venus of Petřkovice	23,000	Silesia, Czech Republic	hematite	1953
Venus figurines of Mal'ta	23,000	Irkutsk Oblast, Russia	ivory	1928
Venuses of Buret'	20,000–21,000	Irkutsk Oblast, Russia	ivory, serpentine rock	1936 - 1940
Venus figurines of Kostenki	20,000–25,000	Kostyonki–Borshchyovo, Russia	ivory	1988
Venus of Savignano	20,000–25,000	Savignano sul Panaro, Italy	serpentine rock	1925
Venus figurines of Gagarino	20,000–21,000	Lipetsk Oblast, Russia	ivory	1926
Venus figurines of Balzi Rossi	18,000–25,000	Ventimiglia, Italy	ivory, soapstone, serpentine, chlorite	1883 - 1895
Vénus impudique	16,000	Laugerie-Basse, France	ivory	1864
Venus of Waldstetten	15,000	Waldstetten, Germany	Quartzite	2015
Venus of Eliseevichi	15,000	Bryansk, Russia	ivory	1930
Venus figurines of Zaraysk	14,000–20,000	Zaraysk, Russia	ivory	2005
Venus figurines of Gönnersdorf	11,500–15,000	Neuwied, Germany	ivory, antler, bone	1968 - 1976
Venus figurines of Petersfels	11,500–15,000	Engen, Germany	black jet	1927- 1932, 1974 - 1976, 1978
Venus of Monruz	11,000	Neuchâtel, Switzerland	black jet	1991
Venus of Kołobrzeg	6,000	Obroty, Poland	limestone	2022

== See also ==
- Feminine beauty ideal
- Jōmon Venus
- List of Stone Age art
- Matriarchal religion
- When God Was a Woman
- Big Beautiful Woman
