= Venus of Kołobrzeg =

Venus figurine found in Poland

- Wenus z Kołobrzegu
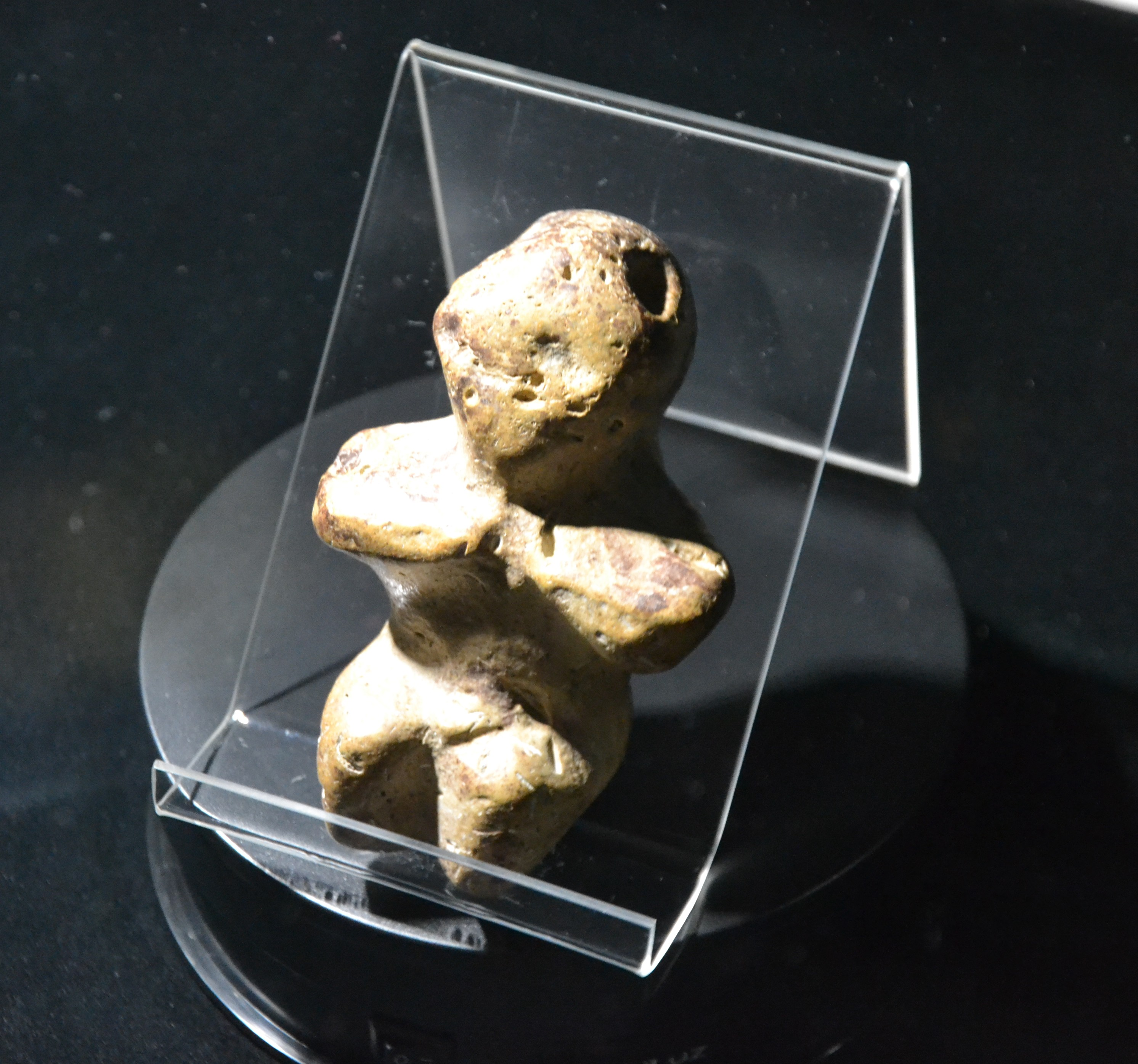
- Material: limestone
- Height: 12 cm (4.7 in)
- Created: c. 4,000 BP
- Discovered: 2022
- Present location: Museum of Polish Arms, Kołobrzeg

Venus of Kołobrzeg is a Venus figurine made of limestone found near the city of Kołobrzeg, Poland in 2022 that was made 6,000 years ago during the Neolithic period. It is currently in the collection of the Museum of Polish Arms.

== History ==
The limestone figurine, referred to as the "Venus of Kołobrzeg," measures 12 centimeters and was found by a Polish farmer in Obroty, a village near Kołobrzeg, in December 2022. It depicts a stylized female figure with emphasized but distorted anatomical features, lacking detailed facial characteristics and exhibiting only symbolic indications of limbs.

In June 2025, a team of Polish archaeologists and researchers confirmed that it was created sometime in the 5th millennium BP. The figurine is believed to have been made by farmers who had settled near the Parsęta River during the Neolithic period. Traces of mollusk shells are visible in the material of the artifact, and smoothing marks on the breasts and hips suggest that it may have been handled regularly by the figurine's original owners. It is believed to be a symbol of fertility.

While anthropomorphic figurines are common at Neolithic sites in Southeastern Europe and Anatolia, the discovery is notable in the Polish context, where no direct analogues have been identified to date. It is also the first such figurine ever discovered north of the Carpathian Mountains. The unearthing and identification of the Venus of Kołobrzeg has been since described as Poland's archeological "find of the century".
