= Venus of Buret' =

Venus figurine related to Mal'ta-Buret' culture

Venuses of Buret'
- Material: Mammoth ivory or serpentine
- Created: c. the end of the 21,000 B.C.E - beginning of the 20,000 B.C.E (Upper Paleolithic)
- Discovered: Village of Buret', Irkutsk Oblast (52.968938°N 103.504646°E)

Location

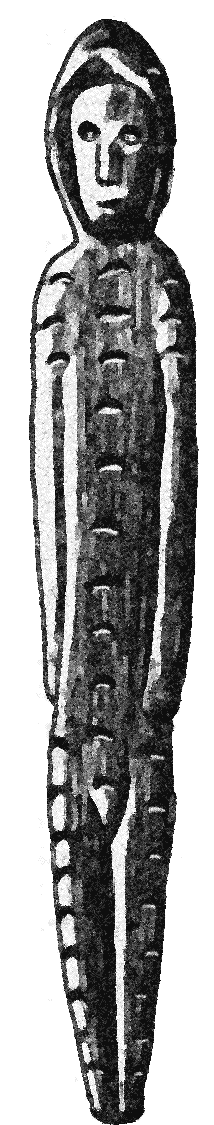
A drawing of Venus figurine 1.

Venus of Buret' may refer to any of the five Venus figurines found from archeological site of Buret' in Siberia near Irkutsk and the Angara river valley.

Four of them are made of ivory and one of them is made of serpentine. One of the figurines (pictured) made of ivory depicts a shrouded person. A similar shrouded figurine has been found from Mal'ta. Carvings on the figurine might represent decorated clothes. The figurine is partially sexually ambiguous due to lack of breasts, but it has an emphasized pubic triangle and vaginal area.

Venus figurines by Mal'ta-Buret' culture of the area are considered to be geographically isolated. They have features that differ from other Venuses of the Paleolithic era, as they have clothes, instead of being nude, and they also have elaborately carved faces.

== List of artifacts ==
Name	Spot of discovery	Discovery	Dated	First publication	Material	Picture	Note
Buret' 1	Dwelling no. 1	1936	21,190 BP	Alexey P. Okladnikov, 1941	Mammoth ivory		
Buret' 2	Dwelling no. 4	1939	21,190 BP	Alexey P. Okladnikov, 1941	Mammoth ivory		
Buret' 3	Dwelling no. 2	1940	21,190 BP	Alexey P. Okladnikov, 1941	Mammoth ivory		
Buret' 4	Dwelling no. 2	1940	21,190 BP	Alexey P. Okladnikov, 1941	Mammoth ivory		
Buret' 5	Dwelling no. 2	1940	21,190 BP	Alexey P. Okladnikov, 1941	Steatite		

== See also ==
- Art of the Upper Paleolithic
- Gravettian
- Mikhail M. Gerasimov
- Venus figurines of Mal'ta
