= Montastruc decorated stone (Palart 518) =

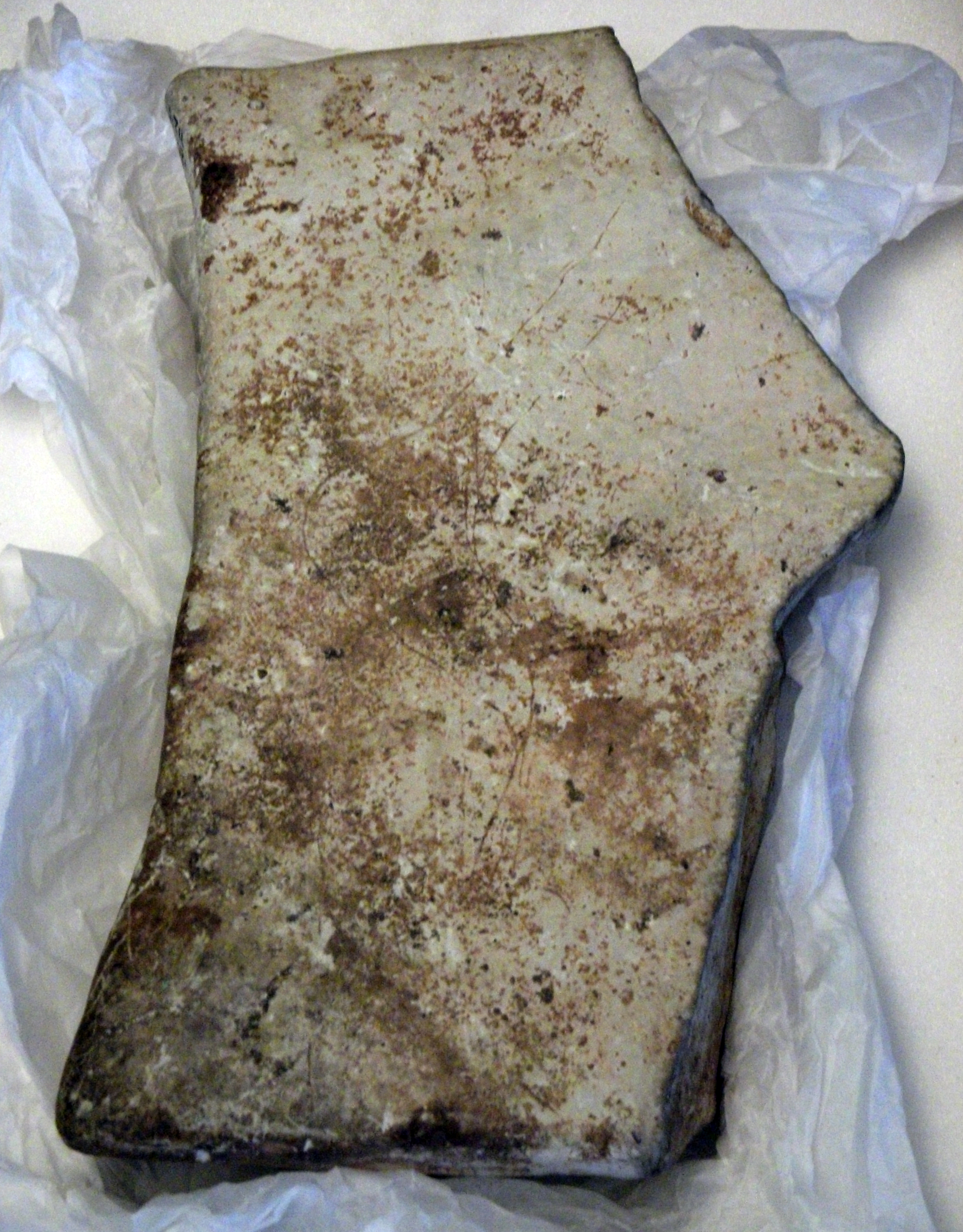
Palart 518; the figure can be made out in the centre of the fragment

The Montastruc decorated stone (Palart 518) is an example of Ice Age art, now in the British Museum. A human figure that appears to be female has been scratched or engraved to decorate a fragment of limestone used as a lamp. The piece was excavated from Courbet Cave, Penne, Tarn, Midi-Pyrénées, France, on the northern bank of the river Aveyron, a tributary of the Tarn. It is dated to around 11,000 BCE, locally the Late Magdalenian culture during the Upper Palaeolithic, towards the end of the last Ice Age. It was excavated by Edouard Lartet and Henry Christy in 1863, and among other items bequeathed to Christie's museum.

The dimensions of the object are: length 23 cm (9.1 in), width 14.5 cm (5.7 in), depth 5.2 cm (2.0 in). It is not normally on display, but between 7 February and 26 May 2013 it was displayed in an exhibition at the British Museum, Ice Age Art: Arrival of the Modern Mind The Swimming Reindeer and Mammoth spear thrower were found at the same site.

The other side of the slab of limestone has a natural depression in which fat was burnt, likely for lighting the rock shelter. The engraving seems to have been made after the stone lamp broke, as the figure is neatly centered on the fragment. The headless figure is shown from the side, bending to the right, with the large rounded buttocks and thigh carefully drawn. The thin torso features a small sharp triangle that may indicate the breasts, or perhaps arms held out. The two lines defining the front and rear of the profile are continuous and "confidently drawn", though they converge at knee level. Extra lines below the waist may represent an apron or skirt. Similar characteristics can be found in engraved figures from Neuwied in Germany.

== See also ==
- Art of the Upper Paleolithic
- List of Stone Age art
