= Eduard Peters =

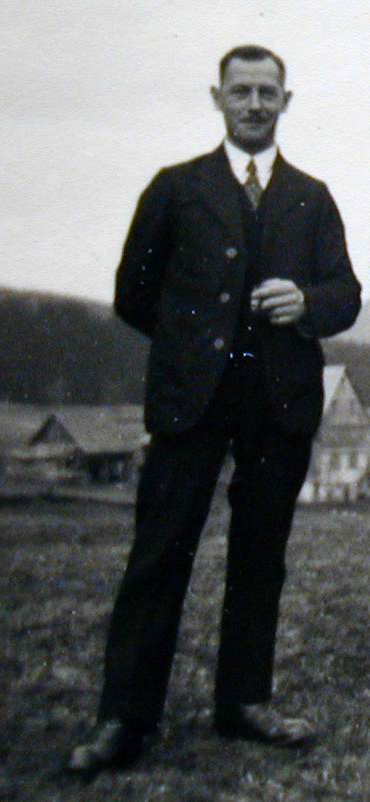
- 1946 convalescent stay in the Black Forest
- Born: 9 April 1869; Halberstadt, Germany
- Died: 22 May 1948 (aged 79); Veringenstadt, Germany
- Occupations: Historian, archeologist

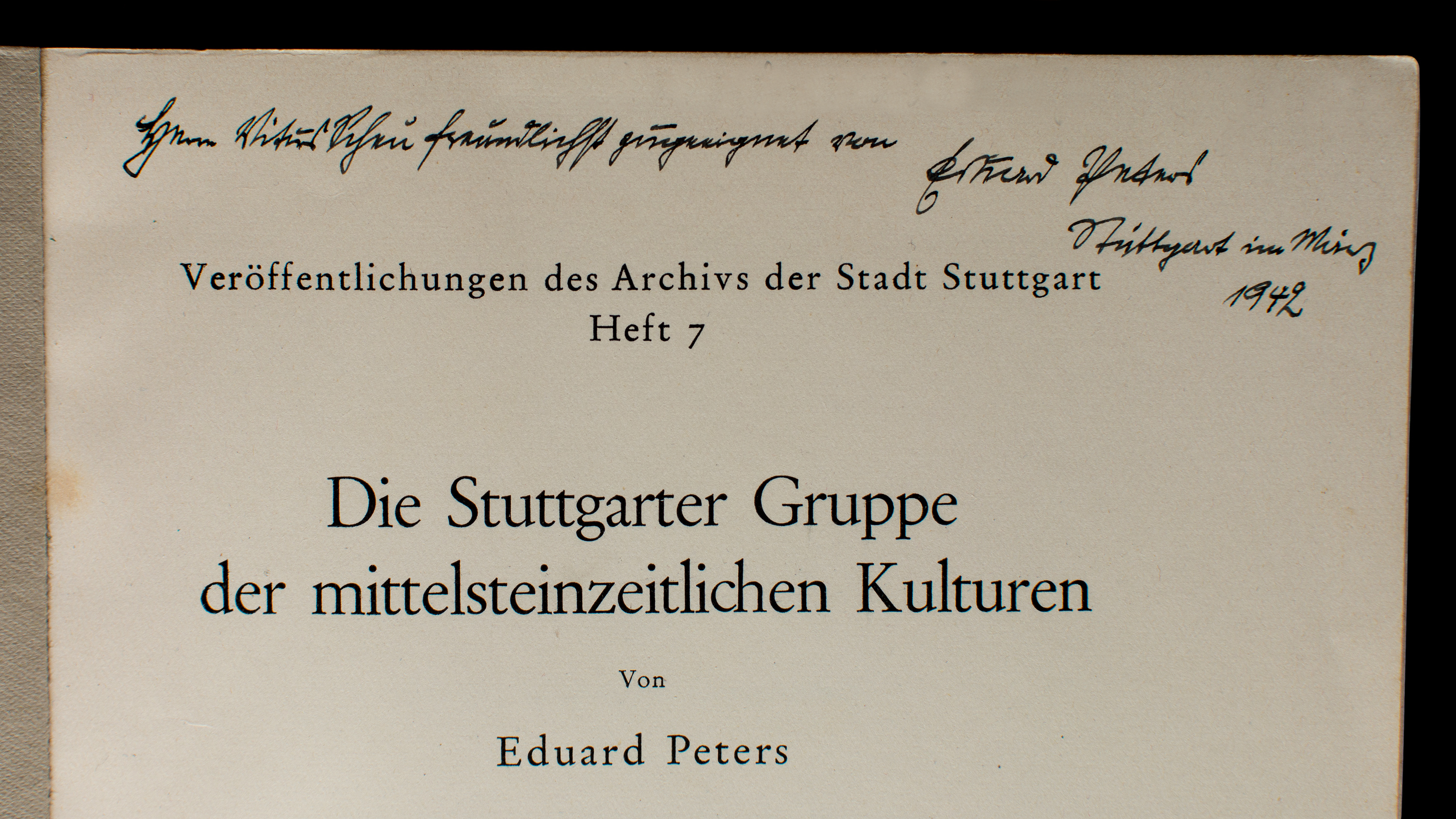
Handwritten note and signature of Eduard Peters (1942)

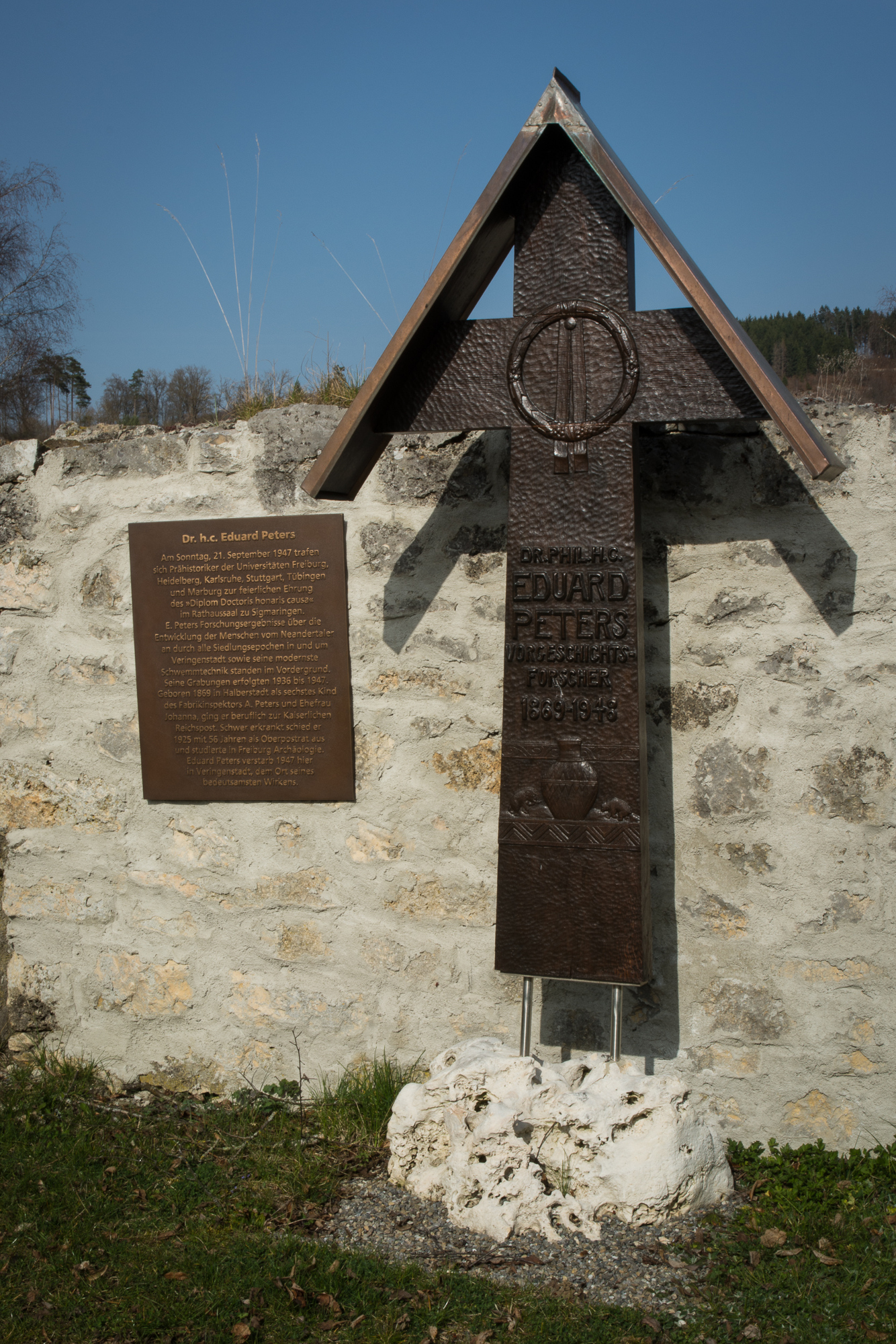
Eduard Peters grave marker in the cemetery in Veringenstadt

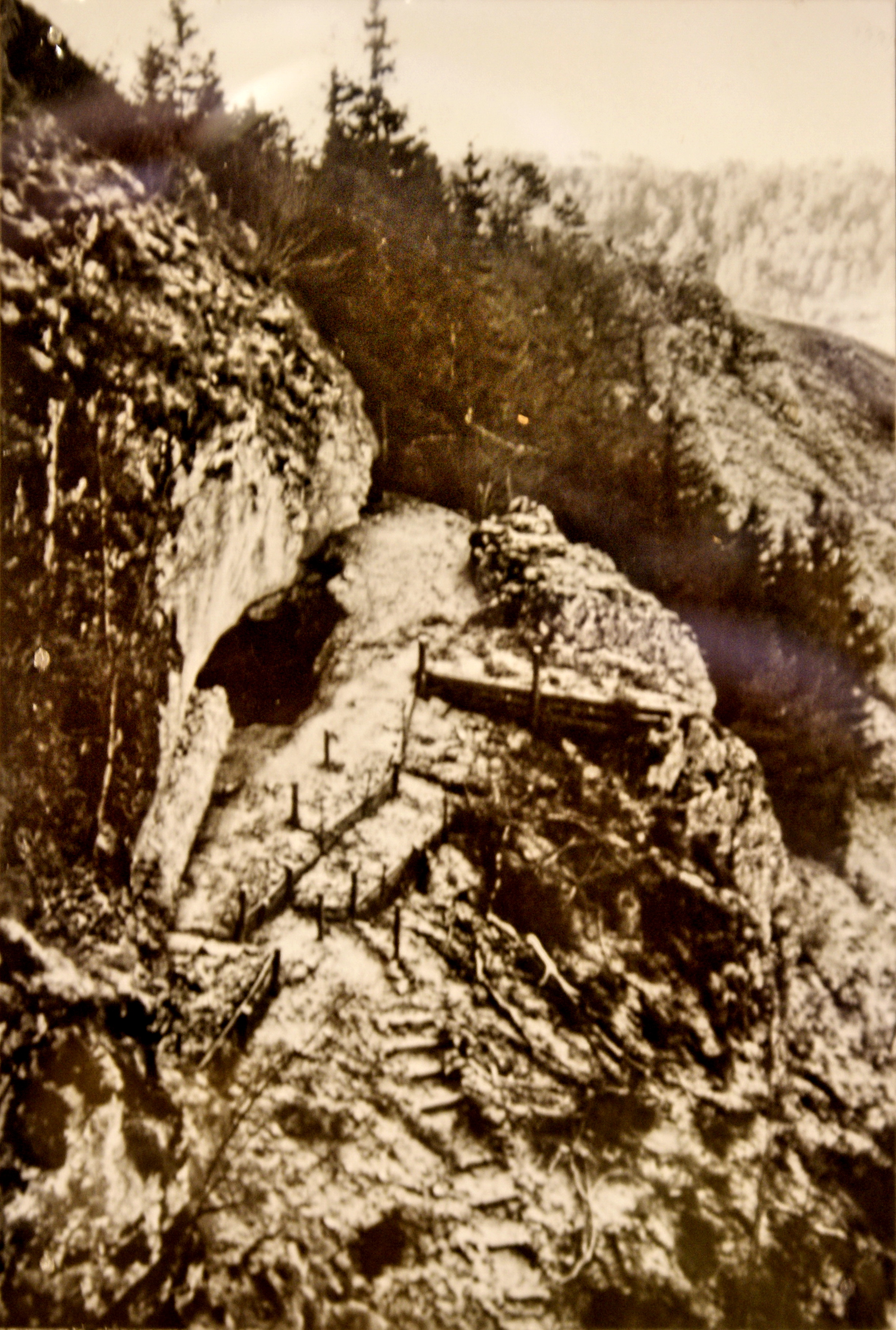
Excavation site Schafstall I in Veringenstadt by Eduard Peters (1946)

Eduard Peters (9 April 1869 - 22 May 1948) was a German historian and archeologist. Initially having a successful career as a senior post officer at Deutsche Reichspost, he is known for his passion in prehistoric research.

== Archeological career ==
The Venus figurines of Petersfels statuettes from the Upper Paleolithic era were discovered in the Petersfels caves near Engen, Baden-Württemberg and excavated from 1927 to 1932 by Peters and Volker Toepfer and then in 1974 to 1976 and 1978 by Gerd Albrecht.

On April 1, 1934, Peters moved from Freiburg to Stuttgart, he worked in Stuttgart in the fields of Mesolithic and Paleolithic archaeology for a decade at the Old Castle State Antiquities Collection until the spring air raids of 1944. Peters decade in Stuttgart was regularly interrupted by months of work in Hohenzollern and archaeological excavations largely in Upper Danube. In 1934, Peters was appointed Hohenzollern state representative of archaeological finds for which he had an office in the Sigmaringen State Parliament building.

From 1939 to 1943, Peters traveled repeatedly to Italy where he spent over five months taking part in excavations of the Istituto Italiano di Paleontologia Umana in the Grotta Guattari in San Feiice Circeo and the Grimaldi Caves by Menton.

== Later life ==
In April 1944, Peters moved to Veringenstadt. On May 22, 1948, Peters died after suffering from a heart attack.
