= Venus figurines of Gagarino =

Paleolithic artifacts found in Russia

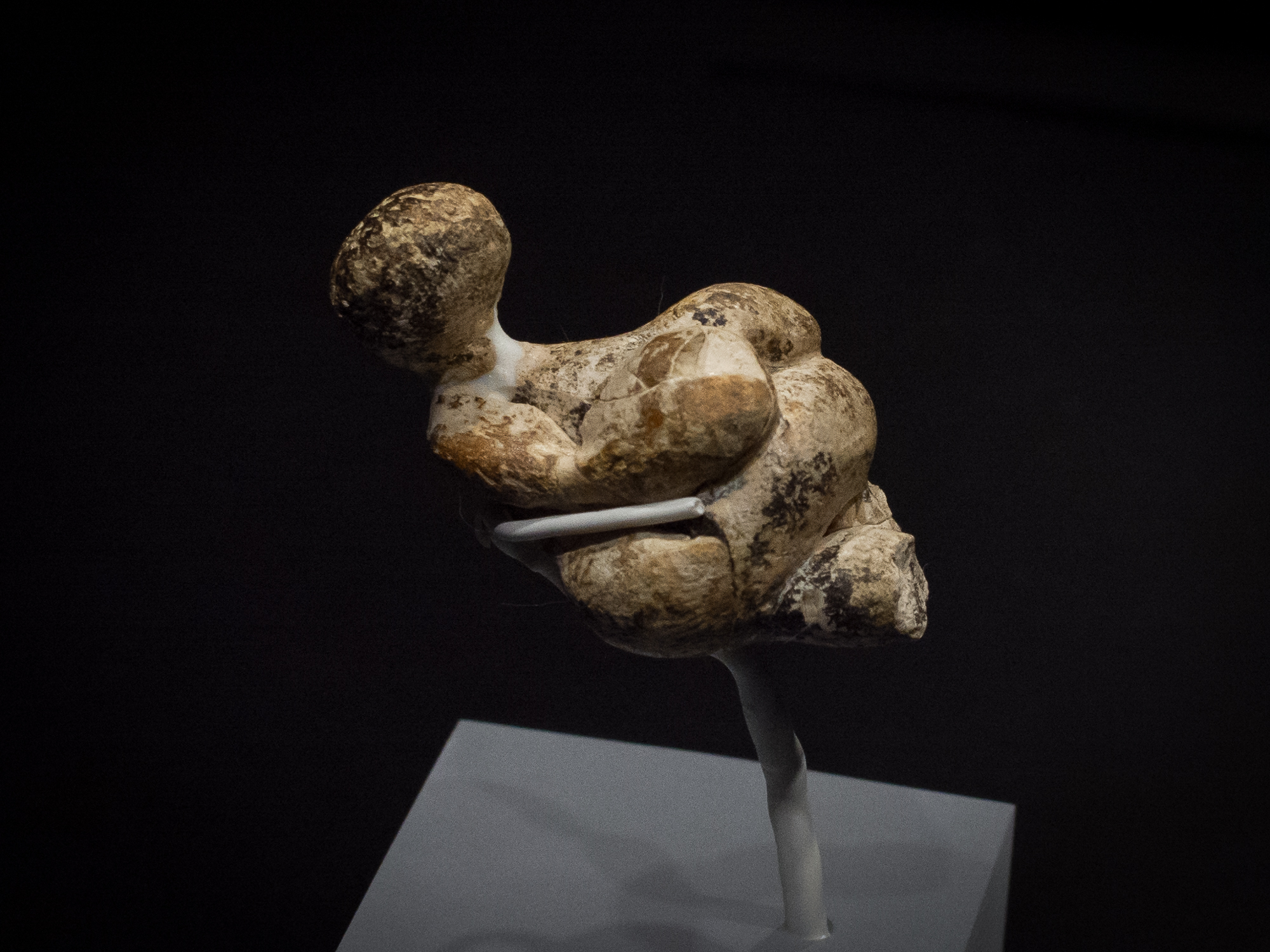
- Venus figurine No. 1 of Gagarino; height: 5.8 cm
- Material: Mammoth ivory
- Created: 21,000 to 20,000 years
- Discovered: Russia

The Venus figurines of Gagarino are eight Palaeolithic Venus figurines made from ivory. The statuettes belong to the Gravettian industry and are about 21,000–20,000 years old. They were discovered near to the village of Gagarino in Lipetsk Oblast, Russia, and are now held in the Hermitage Museum in Saint Petersburg.

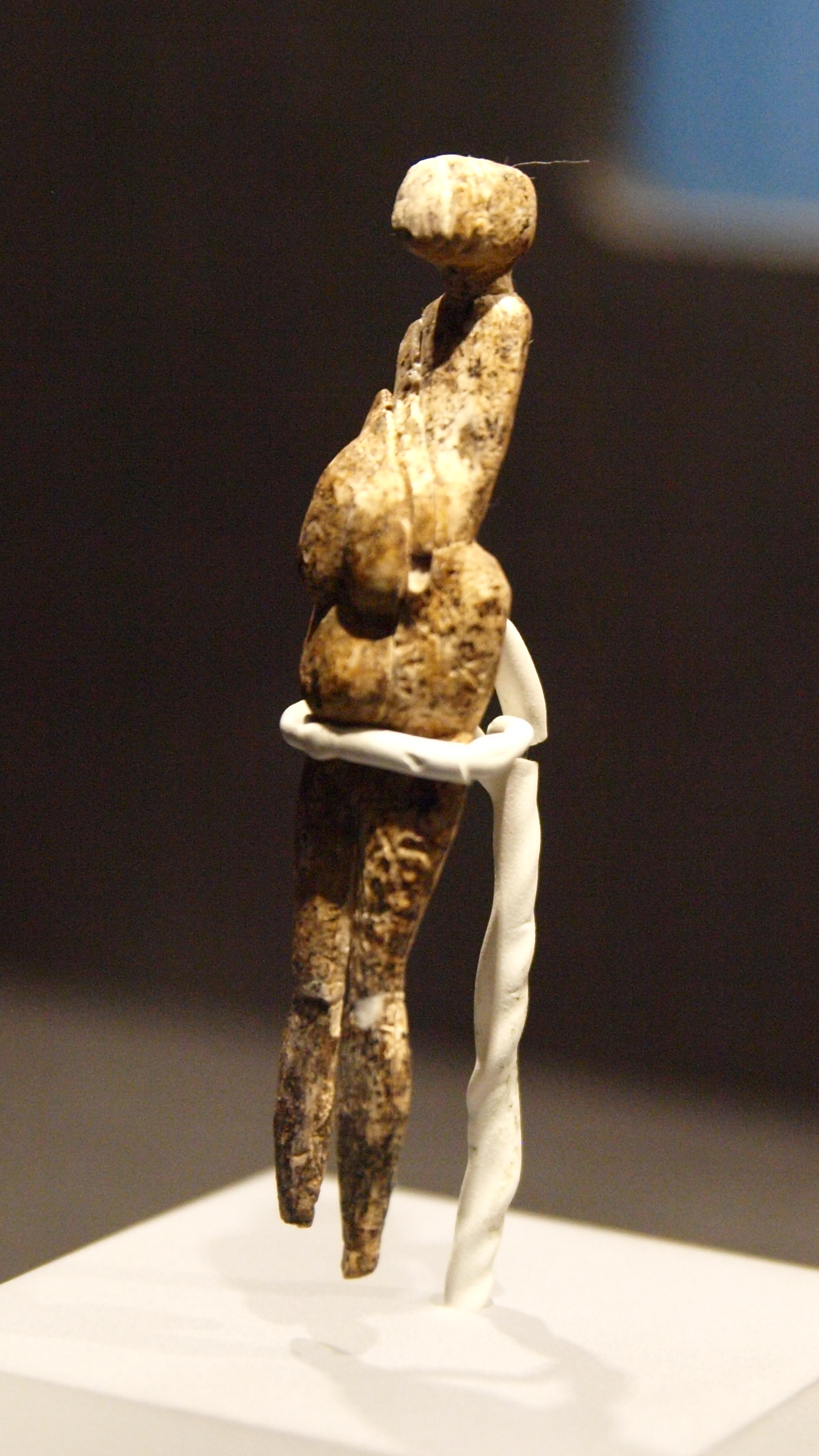
Another Venus figurine of Gagarino; height: 7.1 cm

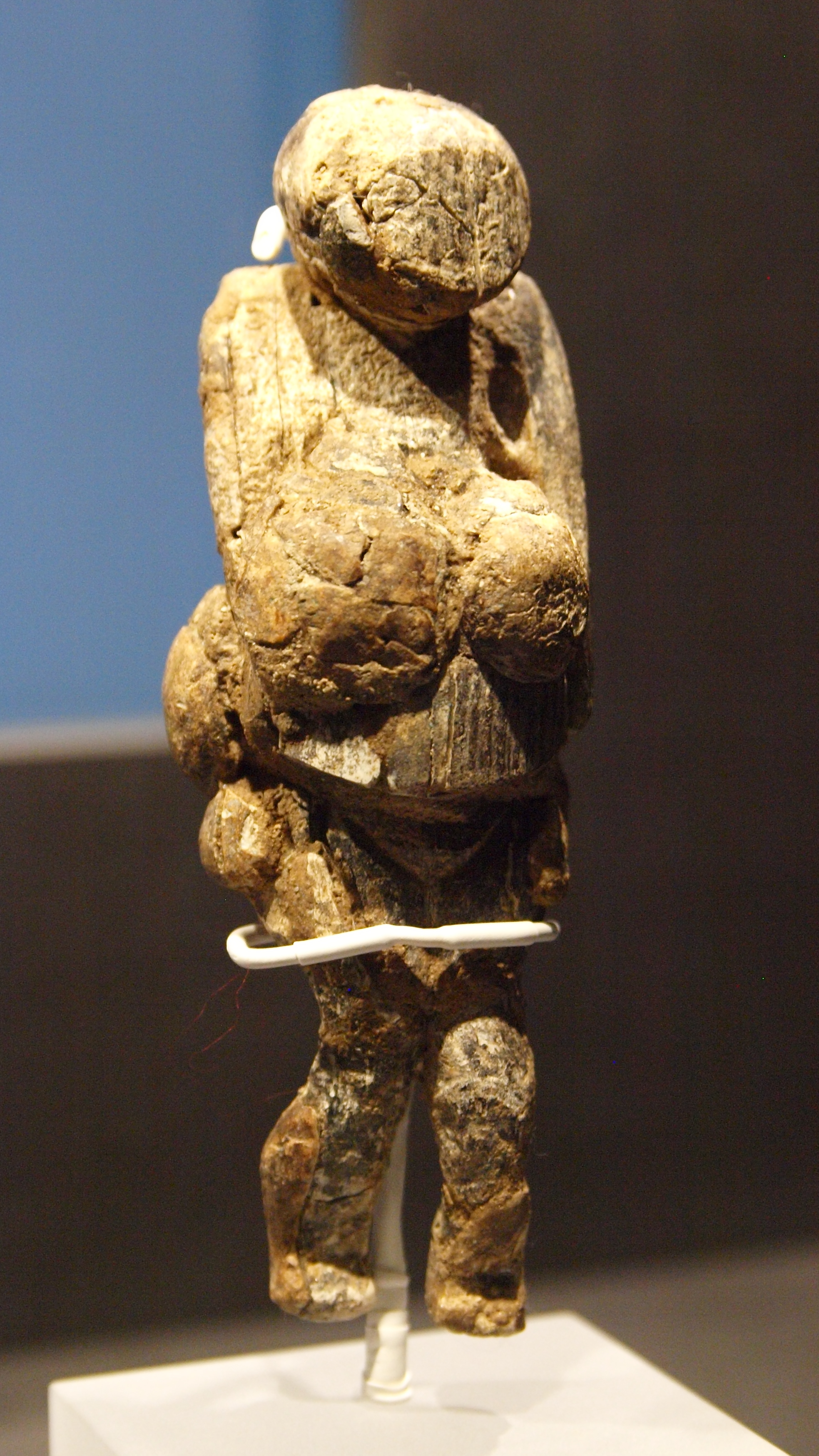
The "Venus No. 4" of Gagarino; height 12.7 cm

The Figurine No. 1 (by Abramova 1962) is sculpted similar to the Venus of Willendorf: The depicted female body is naked and obese, which is not necessarily interpreted as pregnant. The small arms are at the side with no hands. The face is not depicted, but a headgear or a hairstyle is indicated. The breasts are heavy. The mons veneris is indicated.

== See also ==
- Paleolithic Art
- Venus figurines of Mal'ta
