= Venus figurines of Petersfels =

Paleolithic statuettes

Coordinates: 47°51′41″N 8°48′21″E

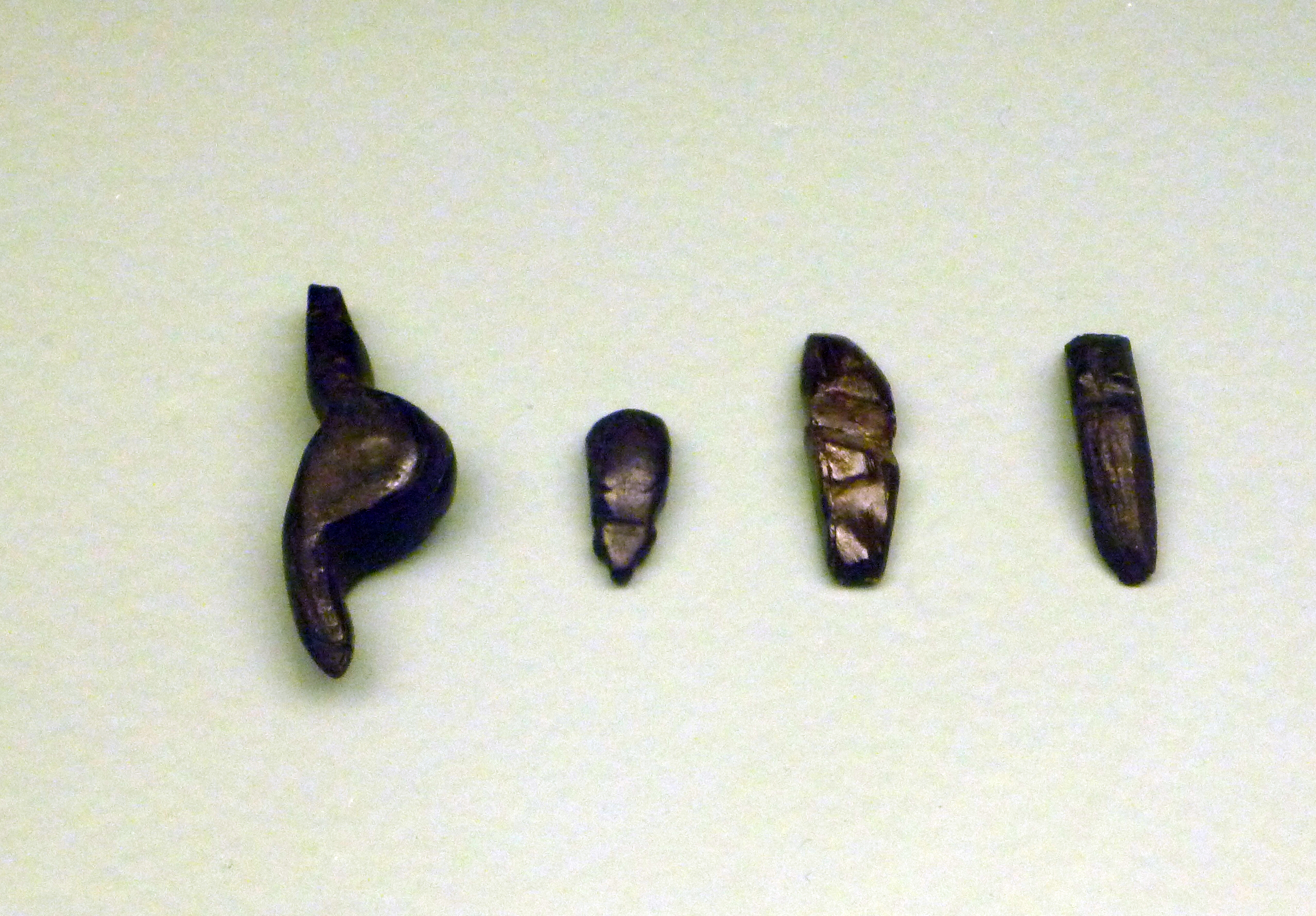
- From the left: Venus figurine from Petersfels, reproduction (Venus of Engen), beetle and two further female figurines from Petersfels; Badisches Landesmuseum Karlsruhe
- Material: Jet
- Created: 15,000 to 11,500 years
- Discovered: 1908; Engen, Baden-Wurttemberg, Germany

The Venus figurines of Petersfels are several small female statuettes from the Upper Paleolithic era, carved from jet lignite. The tallest figurine is called the Venus of Engen. The figurines were discovered in the Petersfels caves near Engen, Baden-Württemberg, excavated in 1927–1932 by Eduard Peters and Volker Toepfer and then in 1974–1976 and 1978 by Gerd Albrecht. They stand between 1.5 and 4 cm tall and are about 15,000 to 11,500 years old, created during the Magdalenian era. They are housed in the museums of Freiburg im Breisgau and Engen.

== See also ==
- Venus figurines
- Venus of Monruz
- Venus of Willendorf

== Bibliography ==
- Karl Dietrich Adam, Renate Kurz: Eiszeitkunst im süddeutschen Raum. Konrad Theiss Verlag, Stuttgart 1980, ISBN 3-8062-0241-9.
- Archäologisches Landesmuseum Konstanz (Hrsg.): Eiszeit: Kunst und Kultur. Jan Thorbecke Verlag, Ostfildern 2009, ISBN 978-3-7995-0833-9.
- Henri Delporte: L’image de la femme dans l’art préhistorique. Ed. Picard, Paris 1979, ISBN 2-7084-0034-7.
- Rudolf Drößler: Die Venus der Eiszeit. Entdeckung und Erforschung der altsteinzeitlichen Kunst. Prisma-Verlag, Leipzig 1967.
- Alexander Marshack: The Roots of Civilization: the Cognitive Beginning of Man’s First Art, Symbol and Notation. McGraw-Hill, New York 1972, ISBN 0-07-040535-2.
- Hansjürgen Müller-Beck, Gerd Albrecht (Hrsg.): Die Anfänge der Kunst vor 30000 Jahren. Theiss, Stuttgart 1987, ISBN 3-8062-0508-6.
- Verena Nübling. Die Venusstatuetten vom Petersfels. Denkmalpflege in Baden-Württemberg, Nachrichtenblatt des Landesdenkmalamtes, (3), S. 129–130, 1999. ISSN 0342-0027.
- Eduard Peters: Die altsteinzeitliche Kulturstätte Petersfels. Filser, Augsburg 1930.
