= Venus of Monruz =

Upper Paleolithic structure

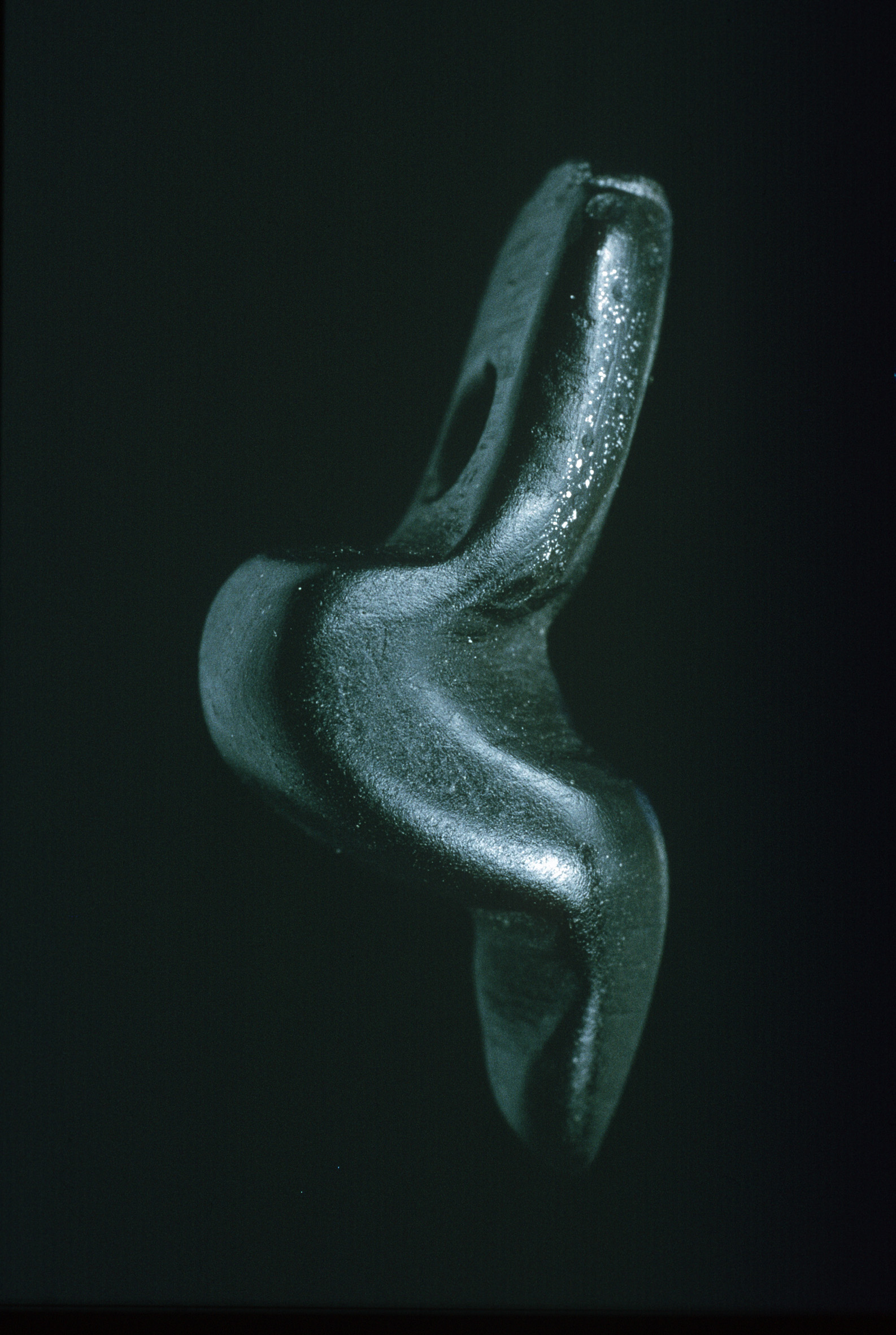
- Material: Jet
- Height: 1.8 cm
- Created: c. 9,000 BC
- Discovered: 1991; Neuchâtel, Canton of Neuchâtel, Switzerland

The Venus of Monruz (also Venus of Neuchâtel, Venus of Neuchâtel-Monruz) is a Venus figurine of the late Upper Paleolithic, or the beginning Epipaleolithic, dating to the end of the Magdalenian, some 11,000 years ago. It is a black jet pendant in the shape of a stylized human body, measuring 18 mm in height. It was discovered in 1991, at the construction of the N5 highway, at Monruz in the municipality of Neuchâtel, Switzerland.

The Venus figurines of Petersfels from a site near Engen, Germany, bear remarkable resemblance to the Venus of Monruz. Especially the biggest of them, called Venus from Engen may have been done by the same artist. It is also made of jet, and also dates to the Magdalenian – to c. 15,000 years ago. The sites of discovery of the two figurines are about 130 km apart.

== See also ==
- Art of the Upper Paleolithic
- List of Stone Age art
