= Obroty =

- Village
- Location within Poland
- Coordinates: 54°7′47″N 15°37′8″E
- Country: Poland
- Voivodeship: West Pomeranian
- County: Kołobrzeg
- Gmina: Kołobrzeg

Obroty [ɔˈbrɔtɨ] (German: Wobrow) is a village in the administrative district of Gmina Kołobrzeg, within Kołobrzeg County, West Pomeranian Voivodeship, in north-western Poland. It lies approximately 6 km (4 mi) south-east of Kołobrzeg and 105 km (65 mi) north-east of the regional capital Szczecin.

For the history of the region, see History of Pomerania.
