= Venus figurines of Kostyonki =

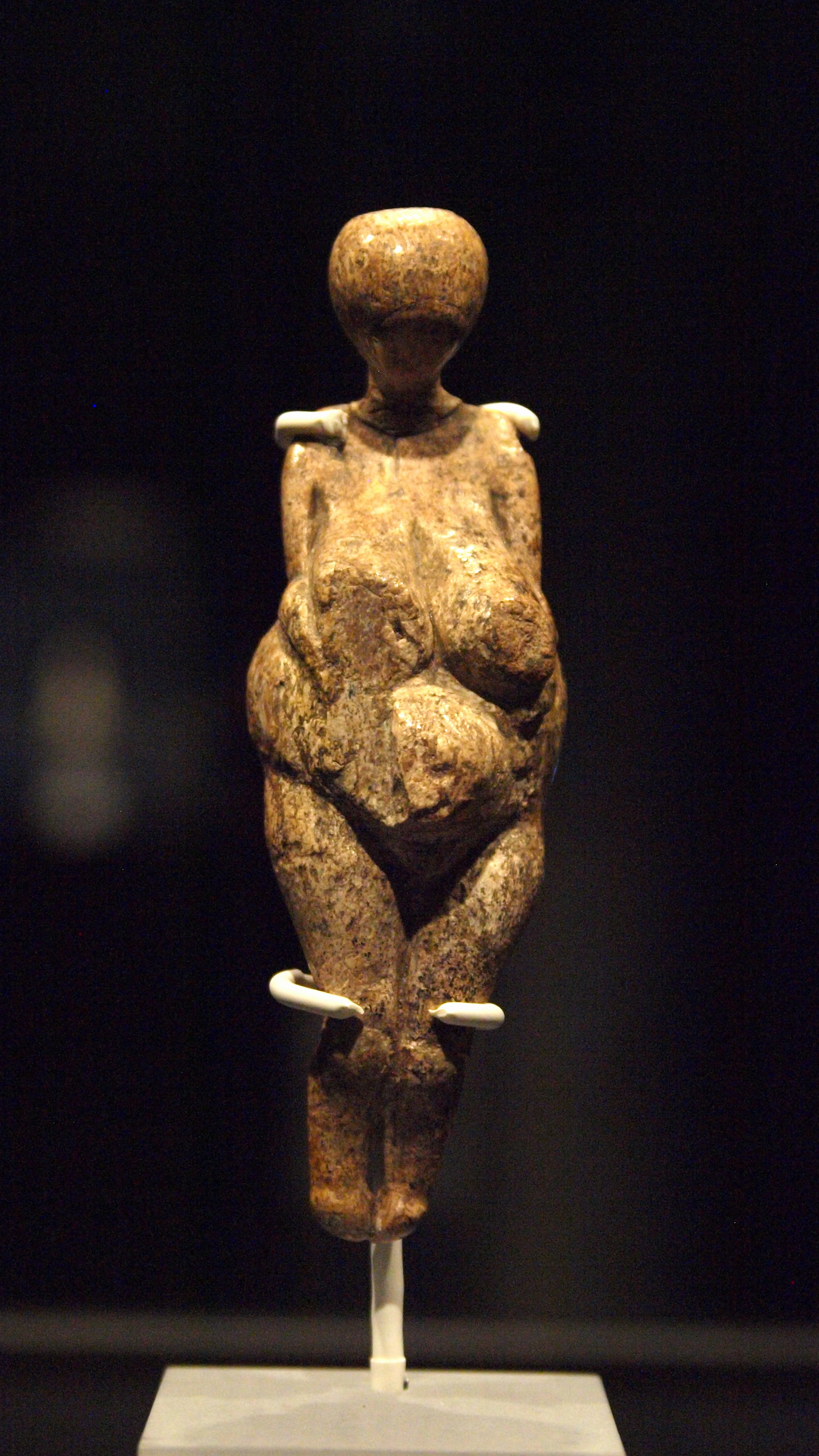
Venus 4 (Hermitage)

The Venus figurines of Kostenki are prehistoric representations of the female body, usually in ivory and usually dated to between 25,000 and 20,000 years ago, making them part of the Gravettian industry of the Upper Palaeolithic period. Found in the Kostyonki-Borshchyovo archeological complex in Russia, these Venus figurines are now in the Hermitage Museum.

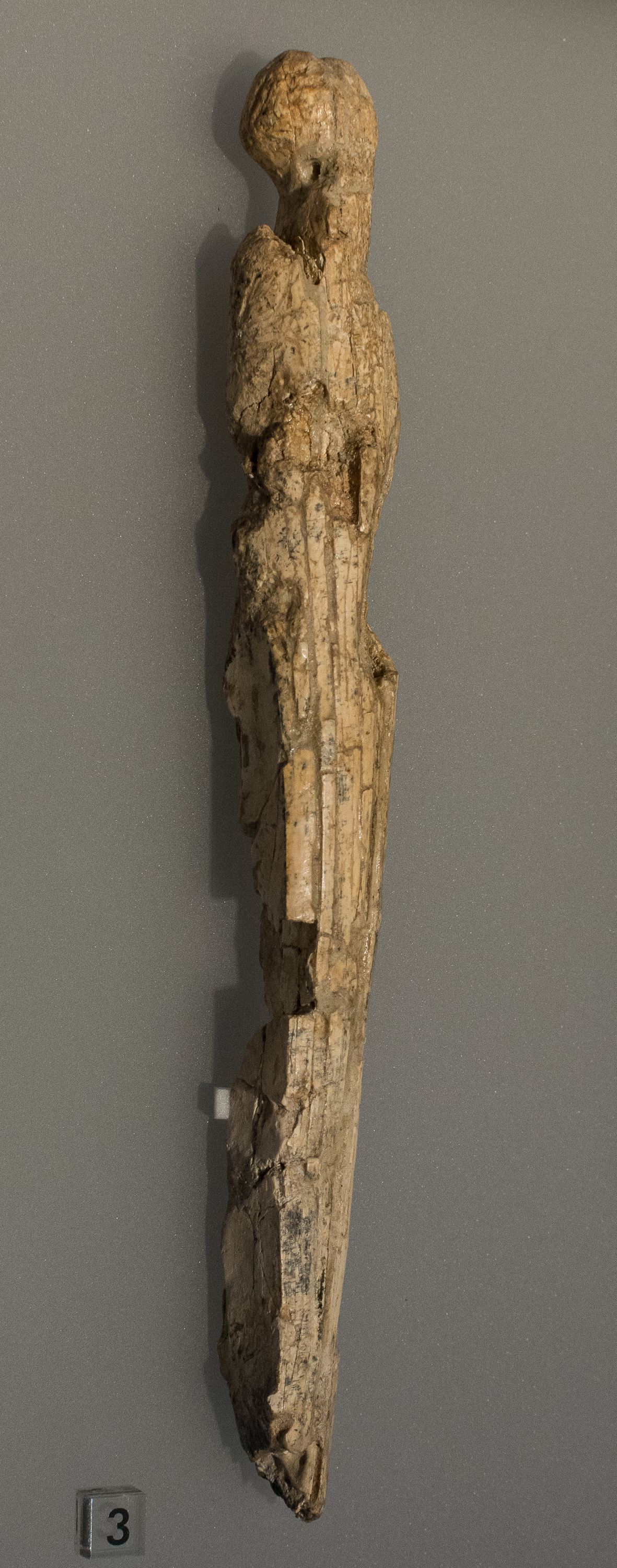
A Kostyonki figurine

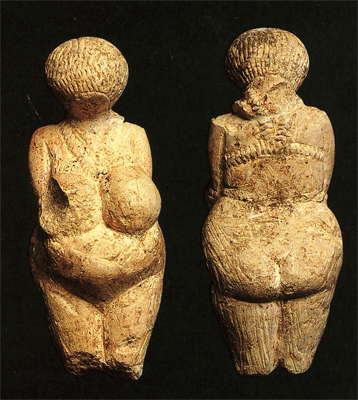
Venus 1

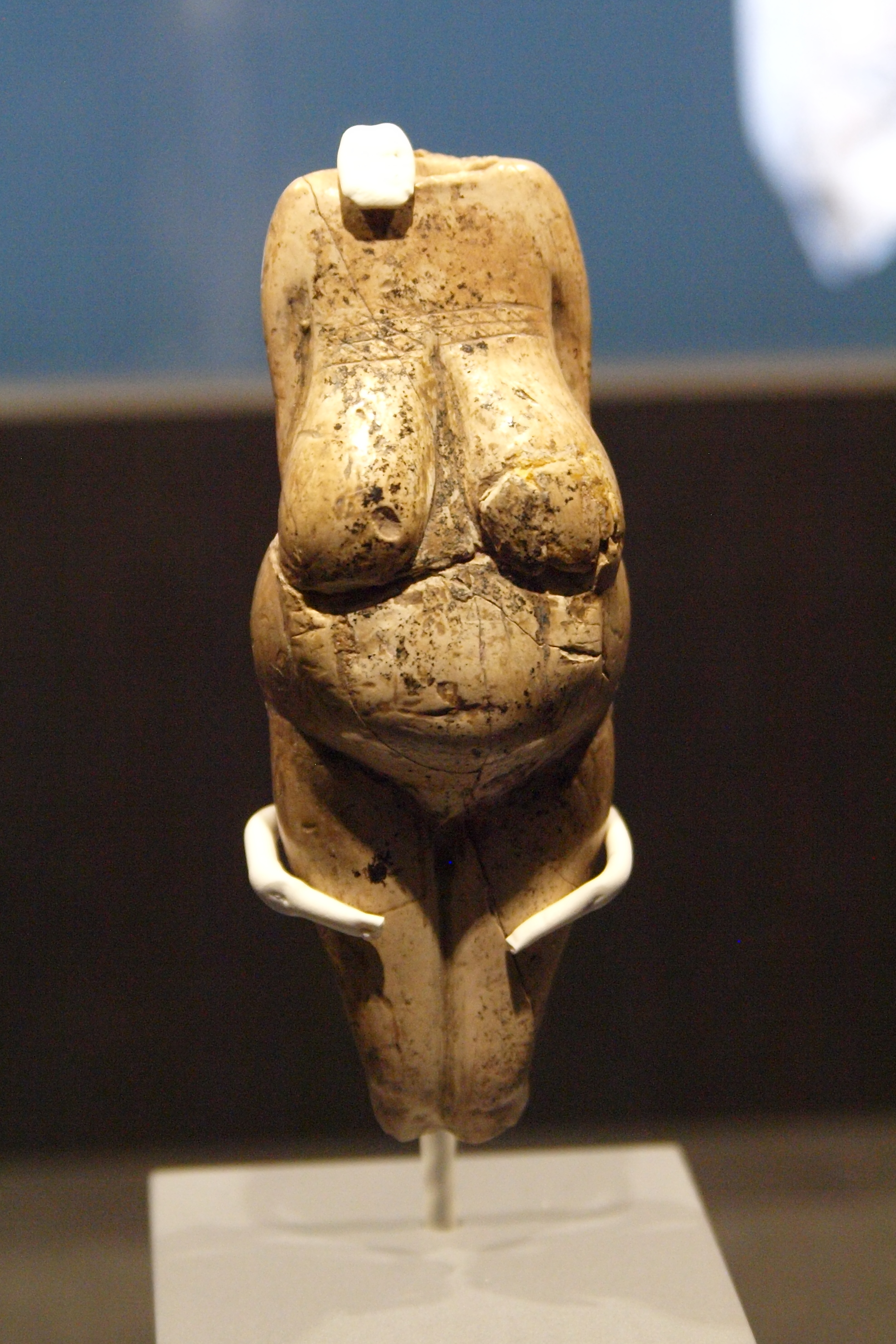
Venus 3
