= Venus figurines of Gönnersdorf =

Paleolithic sculptures found in Germany

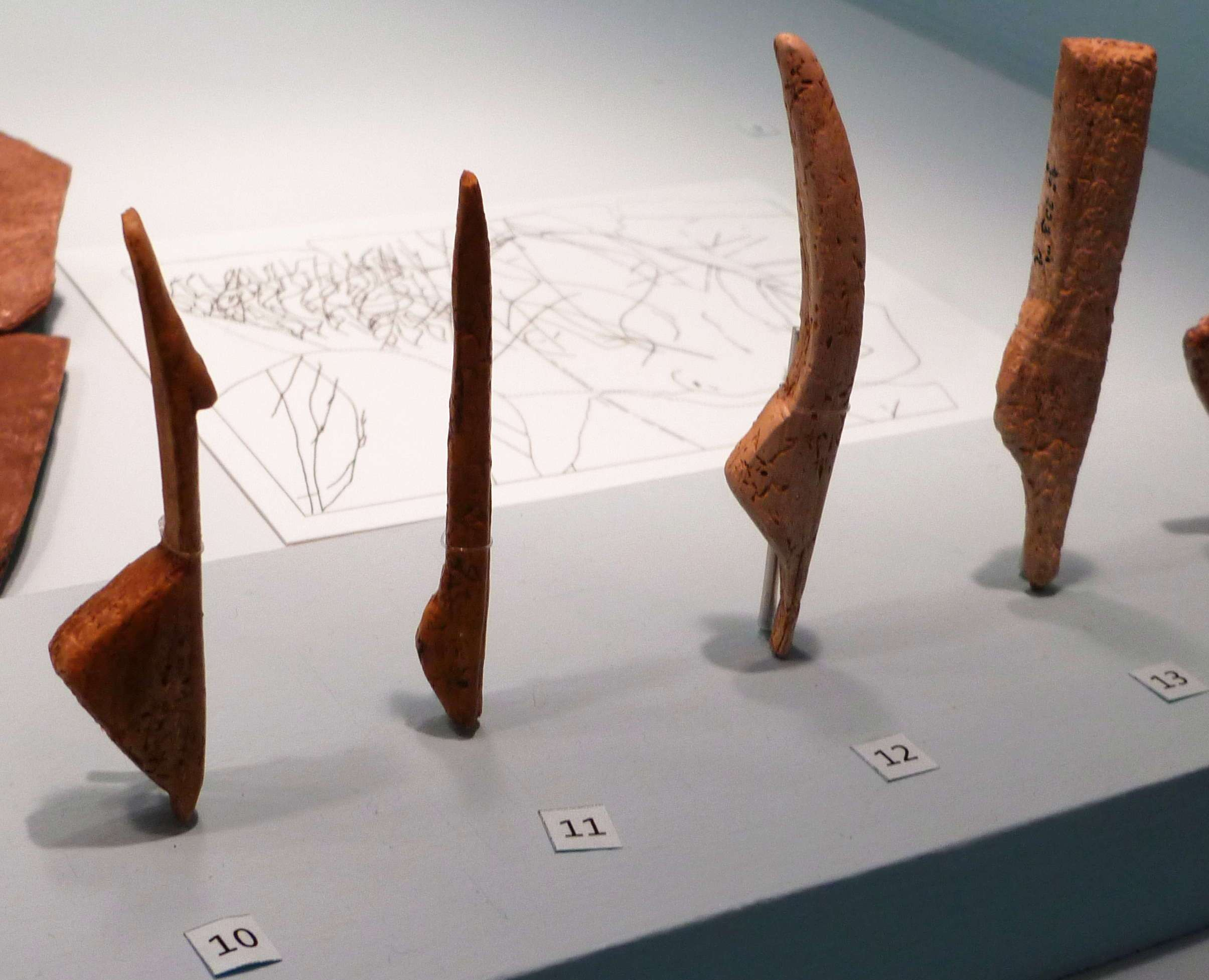
- Venus figurines from Gönnersdorf, replica from the Landesmuseum Bonn: No 10: Figurine of bone No 11: Figurine of antler No 12: Figurine of ivory No 13: unfinished figurine of antler
- Created: 15,000 to 11,500 years
- Discovered: Neuwied, Rhineland-Palatinate, Germany

The Venus figurines from Gönnersdorf, found at Neuwied, Germany, are paleolithic sculptures depicting the female body.

== Discovery ==
Gerhard Bosinski led the excavations between 1968 and 1976 at Neuwied, a town on the Rhine in Germany.

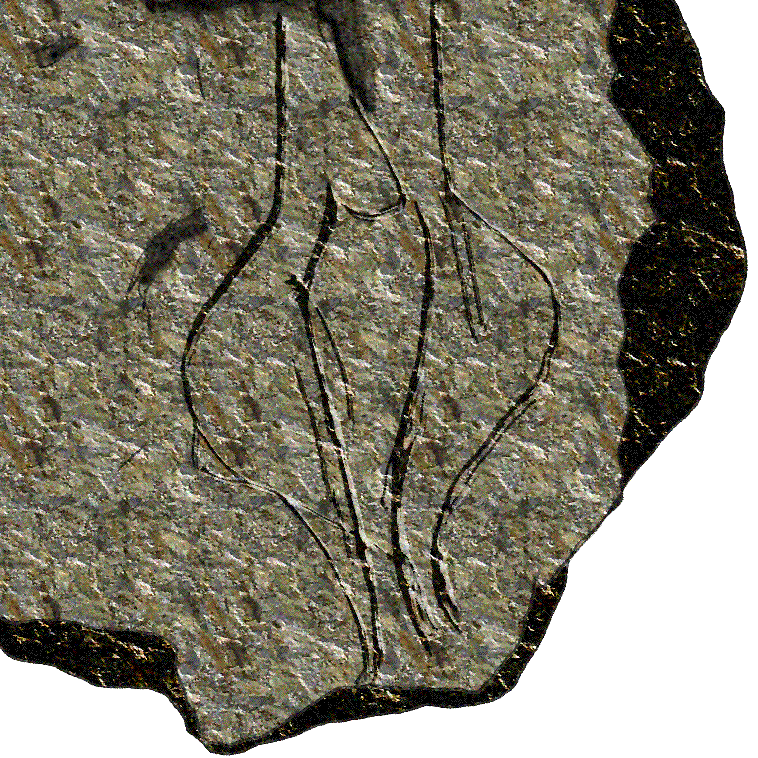
Engraving on slate

== Features ==
The figures consist of carved bone, antler or mammoth tusk ivory. They are between 15,000 and 11,500 years old and date from the Magdalenian period. They measure between 5.4 and 8.7 centimetres (2.1 and 3.4 in) long.

Many other engravings on slate of animals, human beings and abstract signs were found at the same location. The depictions of human beings were highly stylized. Most depicted women, always in profile and without a head. The Montastruc decorated stone (Palart 518) in the British Museum has similar stylization.

== See also ==
- Art of the Upper Paleolithic
- List of Stone Age art
- Venus figurines
- Venus of Willendorf
- Venus of Dolní Věstonice

== Literature ==
- Bosinski, G. (1979). Die Ausgrabungen in Gönnersdorf 1968–1976 und die Siedlungsbefunde der Grabung 1968. Mit Beiträgen von David Batchelor. Wiesbaden: Steiner. ISBN 3-515-02509-X.
- Delporte H. (1979). L’image de la femme dans l’art préhistorique. Paris: Ed. Picard.
- Müller-Beck, H. & Albrecht, G. (ed.), (1987). Die Anfänge der Kunst vor 30000 Jahren. Stuttgart: Theiss.
