= List of Stone Age art =

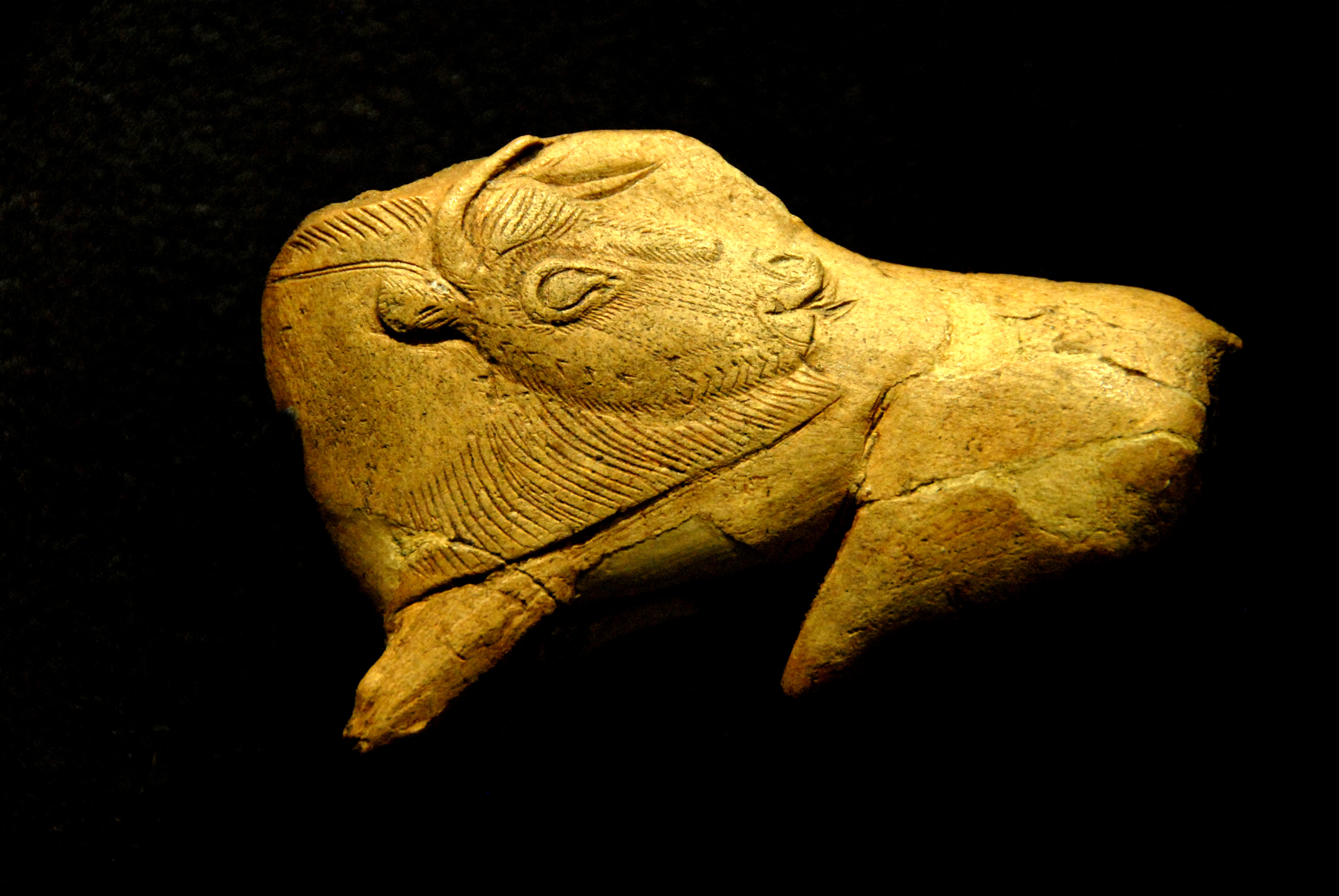
Bison Licking Insect Bite; 15,000-13,000 BC; antler; National Museum of Prehistory (Les Eyzies-de-Tayac-Sireuil, France)

This is a descriptive list of Stone Age art, the period of prehistory characterised by the widespread use of stone tools. This article contains, by sheer volume of the artwork discovered, a very incomplete list of the works of the painters, sculptors, and other artists who created what is now called prehistoric art. For fuller lists see Art of the Upper Paleolithic, Art of the Middle Paleolithic, and Category:Prehistoric art and its many sub-categories.

== Upper Paleolithic ==
=== Aurignacian ===
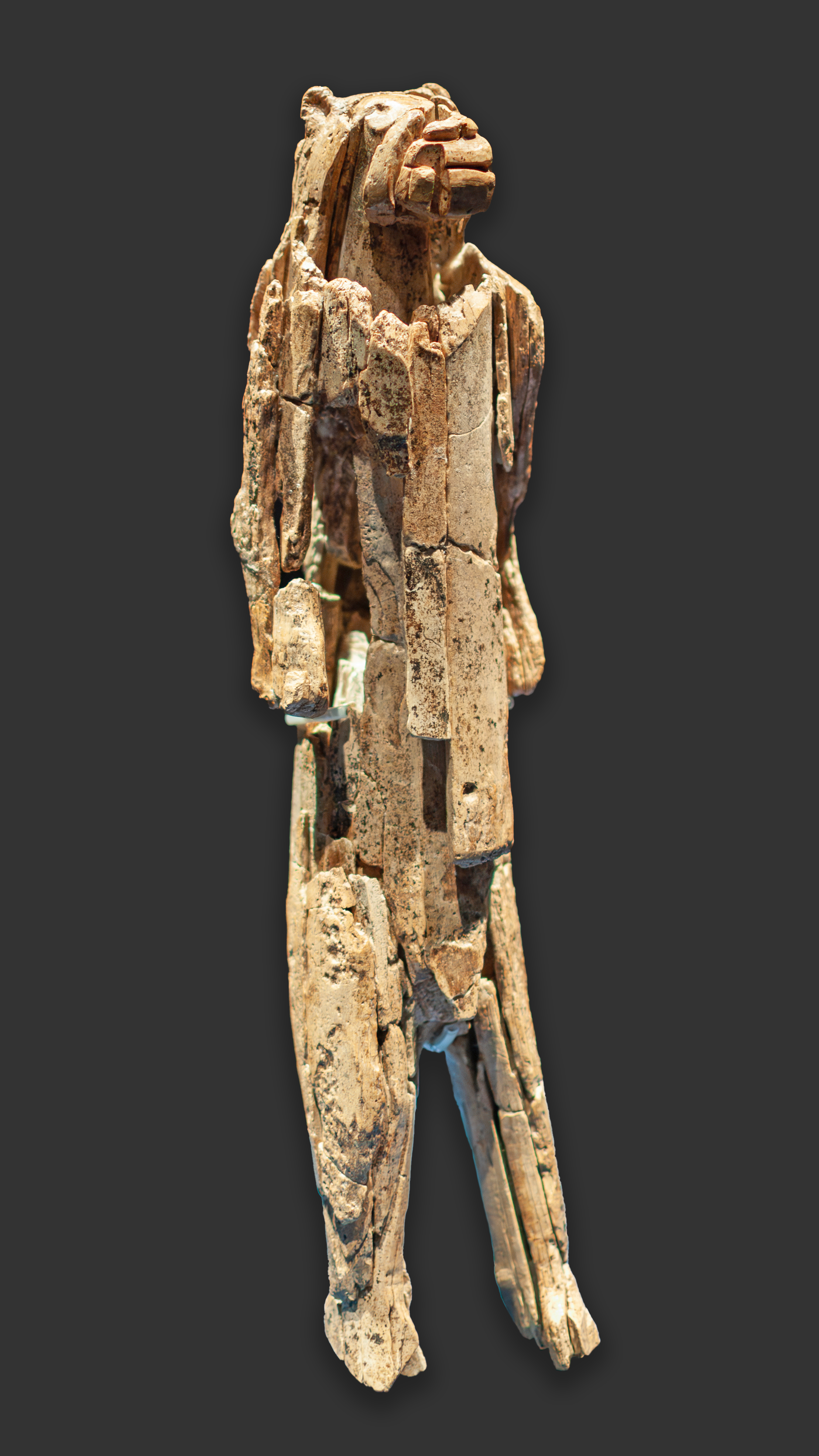
The Löwenmensch figurine, ca. 40,000-35,000 yrs BP, discovered in Hohlenstein-Stadel, now in Museum Ulm.

The oldest undisputed figurative art appears with the Aurignacian, about 40,000 years ago, which is associated with the earliest presence of Cro-Magnon artists in Europe. Figurines with date estimates of 40,000 years are the so-called Lion-man and Venus of Hohle Fels, both found in the Southern Germany caves of the Swabian Jura.

- Löwenmensch, or Lion-man, dated between 40,000 and 35,000 years old, is an ivory figurine discovered in the Hohlenstein-Stadel, Swabian Jura, Germany. The figurine represents a human body with a lion head. It is both the oldest known zoomorphic figurine in the world and one of the oldest known examples of figurative art. The figurine is now in the Museum Ulm, Ulm, Germany.
- Adorant from the Geißenklösterle cave, dated between 40,000 and 35,000 years old, is a section of mammoth ivory with a relief of a human figure, found in the Geißenklösterle cave, Swabian Jura, Germany. The posture of the figure is usually interpreted as an expression of worship, which is why in German the figure is called an "adorant", a word meaning a "worshipper". It is now in the Landesmuseum Württemberg, Stuttgart, Germany.
- Vogelherd figurines, dated between 40,000 and 29,000 years old, are mammoth ivory figurines found in the Vogelherd Cave, Swabian Jura, Germany. The figurines mostly represent animals, such as lions, mammoths, horse, etc. About 20 original figurines can be visited in the Museum of the University of Tübingen (MUT).
- Venus of Hohle Fels, dated between 40,000 and 35,000 years ago, is a Venus figurine made of mammoth ivory. The figurine was found in Hohle Fels, Swabian Jura, Germany. The Venus of Hohle Fels is the oldest known undisputed depiction of a human. It is now in the Prehistoric Museum Blaubeuren, Blaubeuren, Germany.

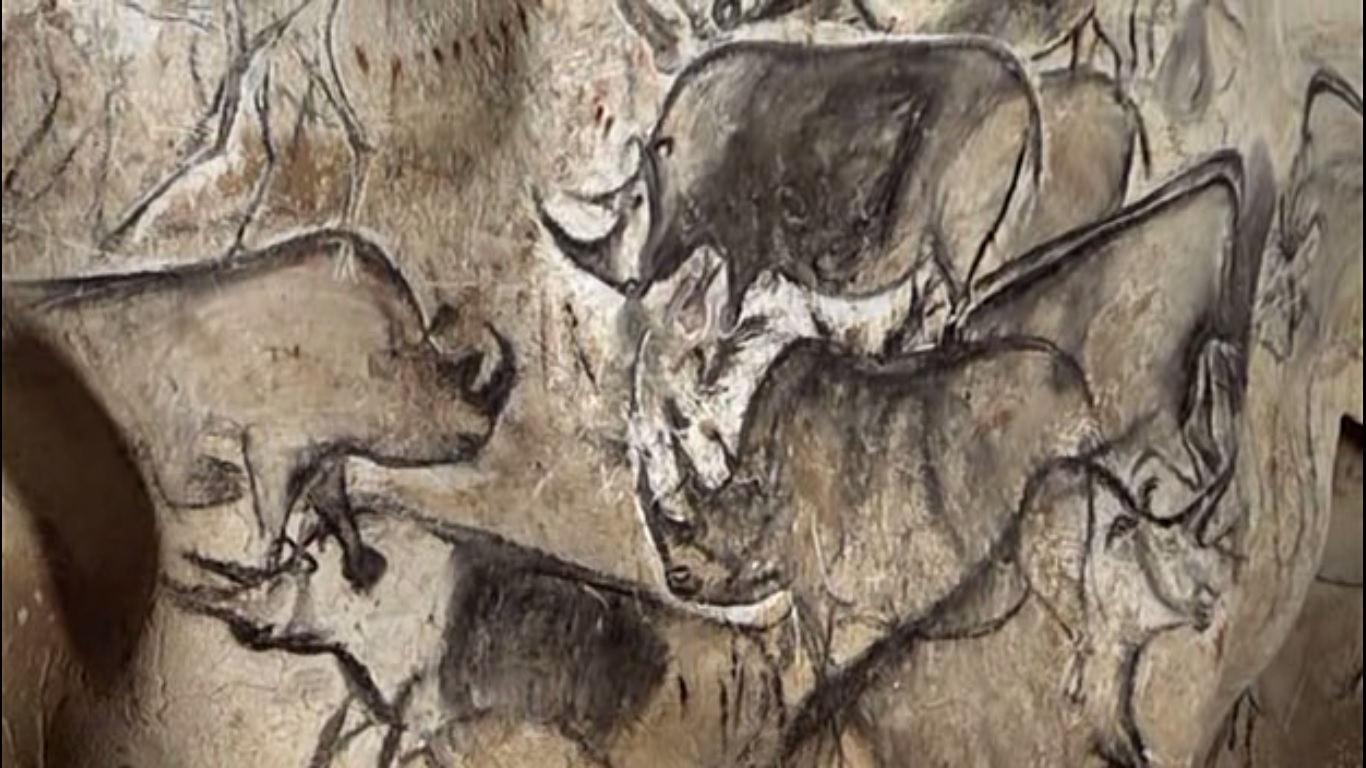
An artistic depiction of a group of rhinos was made in the Chauvet Cave 30,000 to 32,000 years ago.

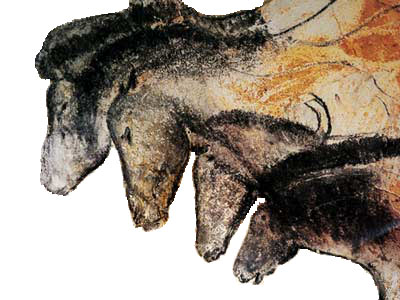
The artist depicts a group of wild horses (from Chauvet Cave, France, ca. 31,000 years old)

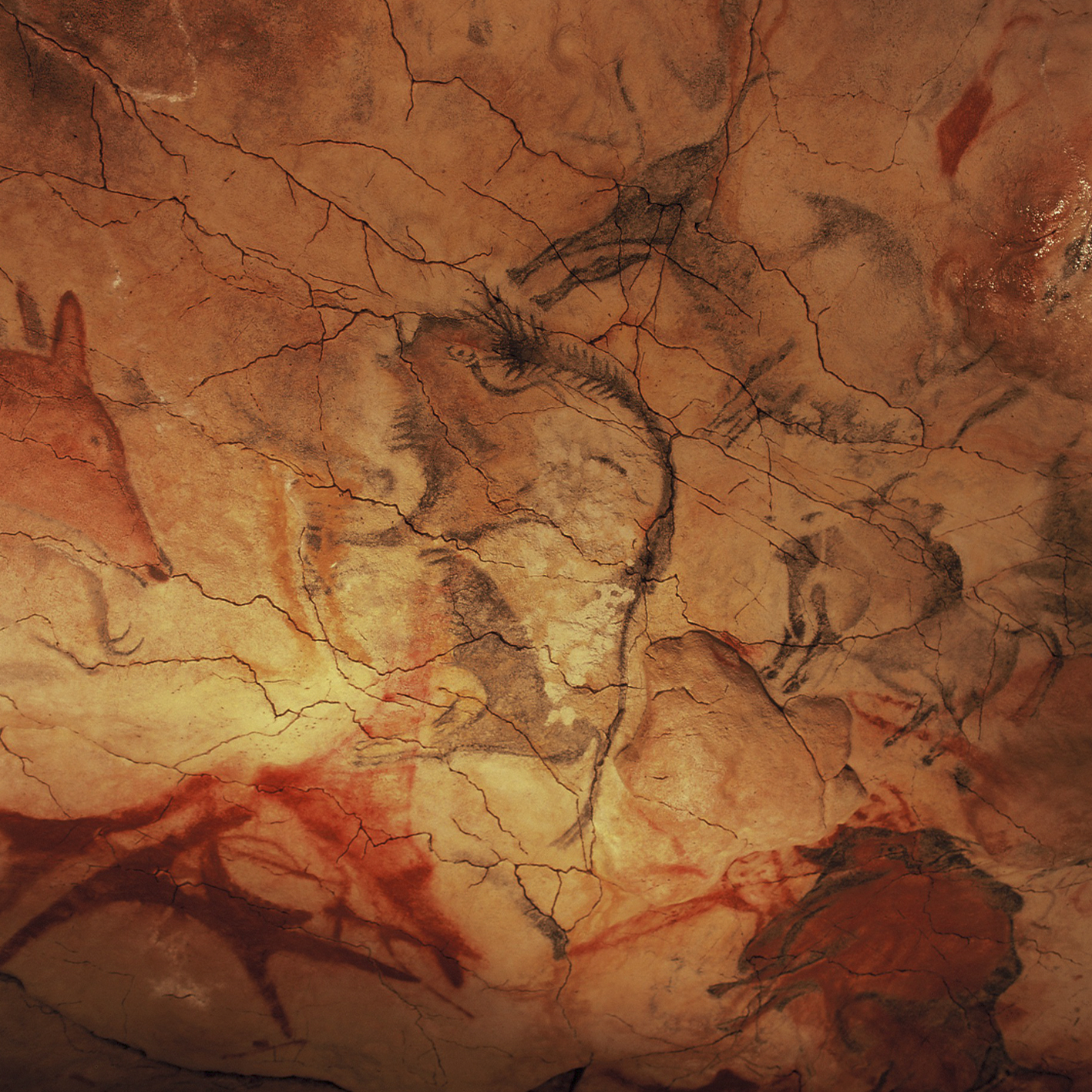
Cave of Altamira and Paleolithic Cave Art of Northern Spain

- Cave art
  - La Pasiega cave (Spain) – an art gallery created in prehistoric times, the exhibition of artwork here runs for at least 120 meters. Contains ladder-shaped abstract drawings controversially dated to older than 64,800 years (Mousterian).
  - Altamira cave (Spain) – in 1879 the first prehistoric paintings and drawings were discovered in this cave, which soon became famous for their depth of color and depictions of animals, hands, and abstract shapes.
  - Chauvet Cave (France) – some of the earliest cave paintings known, and considered among the most important prehistoric art sites.
  - Coliboaia cave (Romania) contains the oldest known cave paintings of Central Europe, radiocarbon dated to 32,000 and 35,000 BP
  - El Castillo cave, one of the Monte Castillo caves (Spain) – contains decorations in red ochre paint which has been blown onto the walls in the forms of hand stencils as long as 37,000 years ago, and painted dots. One faint red dot has been dated to 40,800 years ago, making it the oldest dated cave decoration in the world.
  - Lascaux caves (France) – contains some of the best known artworks of early painters, many of those portraying large animals.
  - Bhimbetka rock shelters (India) – the shelters, decorated with art from 30,000 years ago, contain the oldest evidence of artists exhibiting their work on the Indian sub-continent.

=== Gravettian ===
The Gravettian spans the Last Glacial Maximum, ca. 33–21 kya. The Solutrean (c. 22–17 kya) may or may not be included as the final phase of the Gravettian.

- Numerous Venus figurines from the Gravettian have been found including: Venus of Dolní Věstonice, Venus of Brassempouy, Venus of Laussel, Venus of Lespugue, Venus of Moravany, Venus of Galgenberg, Venus of Petřkovice, Venus of Savignano, Venus of Willendorf
- Cosquer Cave (France) – hand stencils from 27,000 years ago, and 19,000-year-old animal drawings that portray bison, ibex, horses, seals and what may be auks and jellyfish, showcase this gallery.
- Caves of Gargas, France, features numerous negative hand stencils, some with one or more fingers absent.

=== Epigravettian, Magdalenian ===
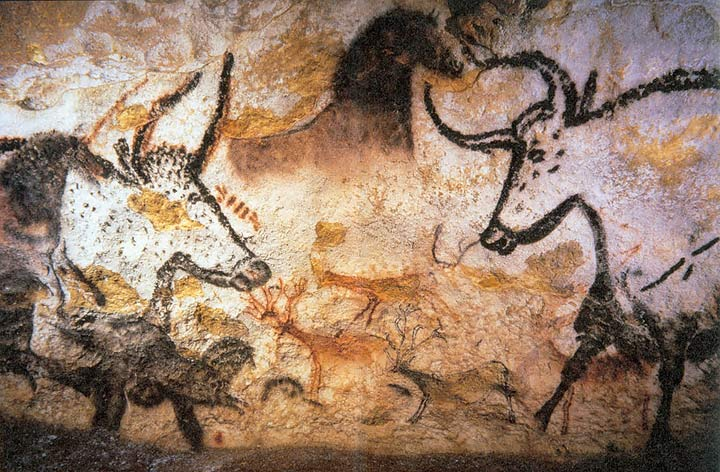
A 16,000-year-old piece of art from the Lascaux cave in France

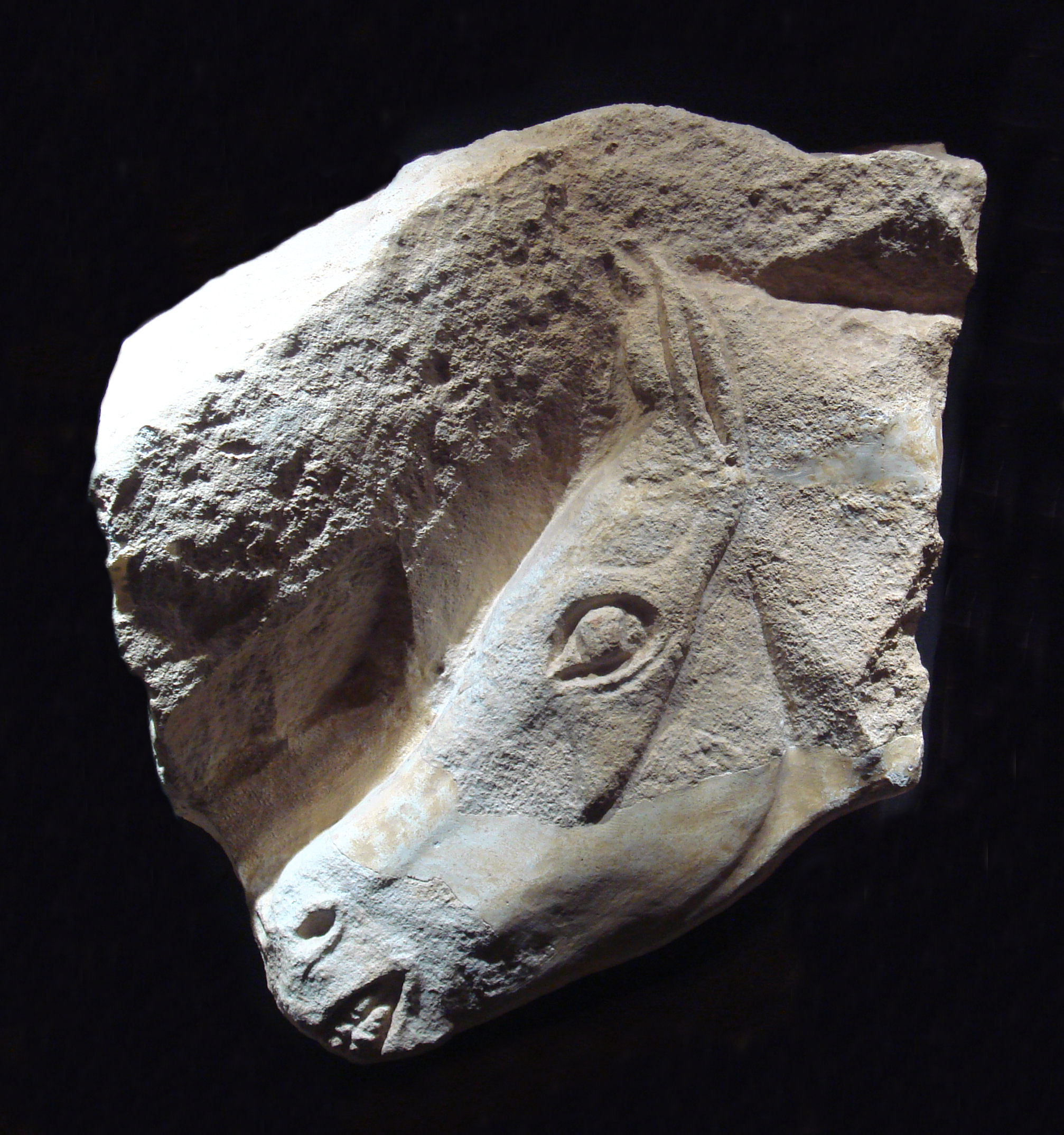
Magdalenian Horse, c. 15,000 BCE, Musée d'Archéologie Nationale, France

- Cave art
  - Chufin cave (Spain) – small cave with engravings, stick figures, and artwork schematically portraying red deer, goats and cattle.
  - Côa Valley (Portugal) – artists engraved thousands of drawings of horses and other animal, human and abstract figures in open-air artwork completed 22,000 to 10,000 years ago.
  - Font-de-Gaume in south-west France contains over 200 polychrome paintings and engravings from artists who worked over 17,000 years ago. The cave's most famous painting is a frieze of five bison, although renditions of many other animals, including wolves, are featured.
  - Kapova cave in southern Ural Mountains (Russia) – presently 173 monochromatic ochre rock paintings and charcoal drawings or their traces are documented, presenting Pleistocene animals and abstract geometric motives. They are about 18,000 – 16,000 years old, from Late Solutrean to Middle Magdalenian.
  - La Marche (France) – due to the style the legitimacy of the cave paintings here are in dispute.
  - Roc-aux-Sorciers (France) – a rock shelter famous for its 14,000-year-old relief wall carvings.
- Perforated baton with low relief horse, from Abri de la Madeleine, an overhanging cliff situated near Tursac in France, and is stored in the British Museum.
- 15 kya Bison Licking Insect Bite, an approximately 15,000-year-old carved and engraved fragment of a spear-thrower made of reindeer antler, the piece depicts a member of the now extinct Bison species steppe wisent. The artist carved the bison's head turned to its right and licking itself as if bitten by an insect. It's exhibited in the National Museum of Prehistory in Les Eyzies-de-Tayac-Sireuil, not far from where it was found.
- Montastruc decorated stone, an approximately 13,000 year old scratched or engraved human figure on a piece of limestone – which appears to be female –used as a lamp. Found in Courbet Cave, Penne, Tarn, France. It now resides in the British Museum of London.
- 13 kya Swimming Reindeer, a sculpture of two swimming reindeer ornately carved from the tusk of a mammoth. Found in Montastruc Rock Shelter, Bruniquel, Tarn-et-Garonne. The sculpture resides now in the British Museum.
- Robin Hood Cave Horse (previously known as the Ochre Horse). This fragment of rib that the artist engraved with a horse's head was discovered in the Robin Hood Cave in Creswell Crags, Derbyshire, England. It is the only animal-related Upper Paleolithic portable artwork ever found in Britain. Robin Hood Cave Horse is now housed in the British Museum.
- Venus figurines of Gönnersdorf
- Venus figurines of Mal'ta, Venus of Buret'
- Pinhole Cave Man, or Pin Hole Cave Man, has become the common name for an engraving of a human figure on a woolly rhinoceros rib bone. The piece was found in Pin Hole Cave, Creswell Crags, Derbyshire, England, and is now in the British Museum.

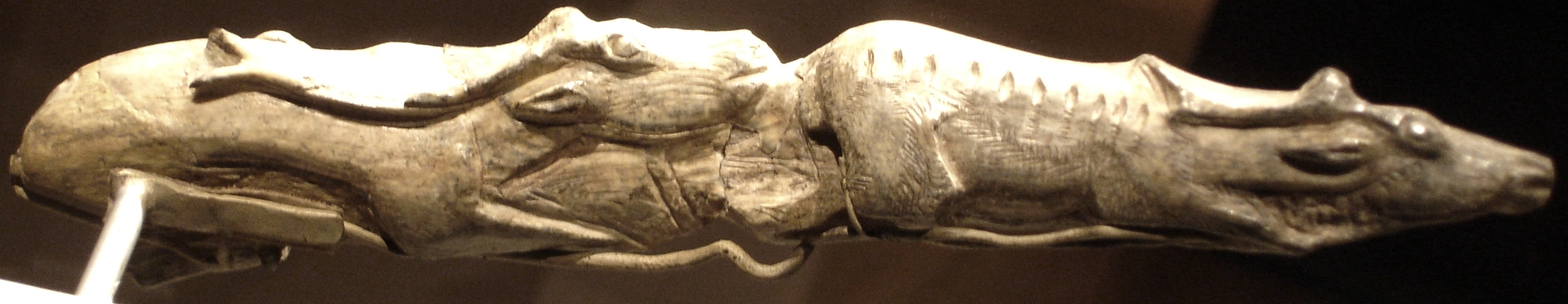
Swimming Reindeer, a 13,000-year-old mammoth-tusk sculpture now residing in the British Museum, depicts a female on the right and a male on the left.

=== Australasia ===
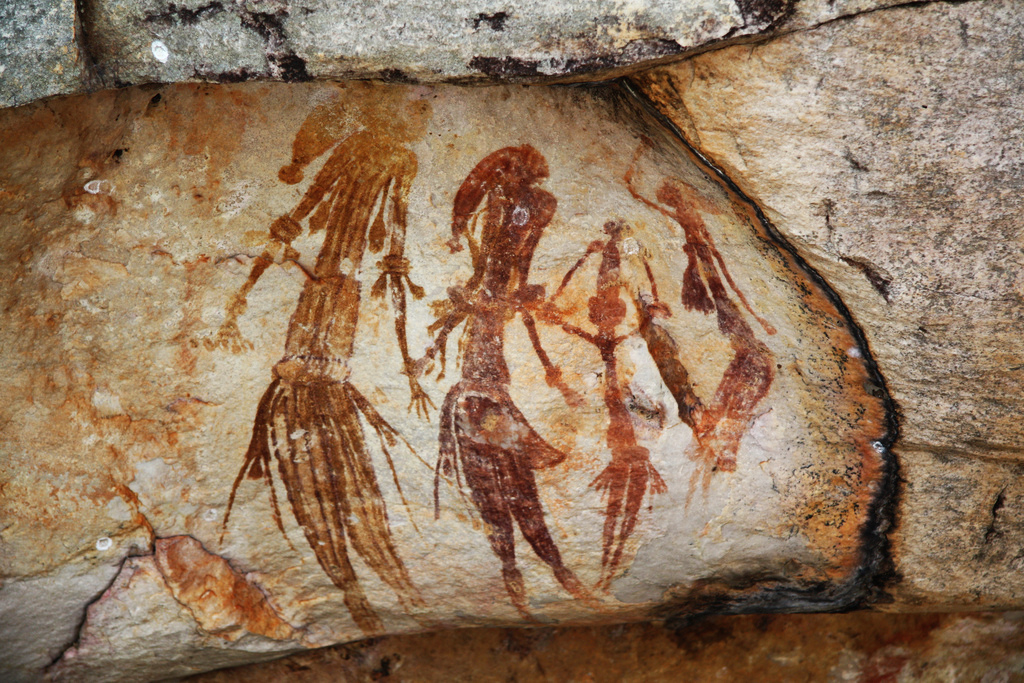
In this Gwion Gwion rock painting from Australia the artist portrays tasseled costumed figures in various poses or actions.

The oldest firmly dated rock-art painting in Australia is a charcoal drawing on a rock fragment found during the excavation of the Nawarla Gabarnmang rock shelter in south western Arnhem Land in the Northern Territory. Dated at 28,000 years, it is one of the oldest known pieces of rock art on Earth with a confirmed date.

- Gwion Gwion rock paintings (Australia) – Aboriginal artists painted well over a million paintings in this site in the Kimberley, many of human figures ornamented with accessories such as bags, tassels and headdresses. These artworks are well over 20,000 years old.
- Gabarnmung (Australia) – this rock-art site in the Northern Territory features the oldest artwork in Australia at over 28,000 years. Aboriginal artists painted fish, crocodiles, people, and spiritual figures, mostly on the site's ceilings. The site also includes panels of recent paintings, radiocarbon dated to between AD 1433–1631 and AD 1658–1952 (calibrated 95% CI), consistent with the reports that the cave was still visited within living memory.
- Sydney rock engravings (Australia) – Contains around 1,500 pieces of Aboriginal rock art, which date from 5,000 to 7,000 years old.

== Mesolithic ==
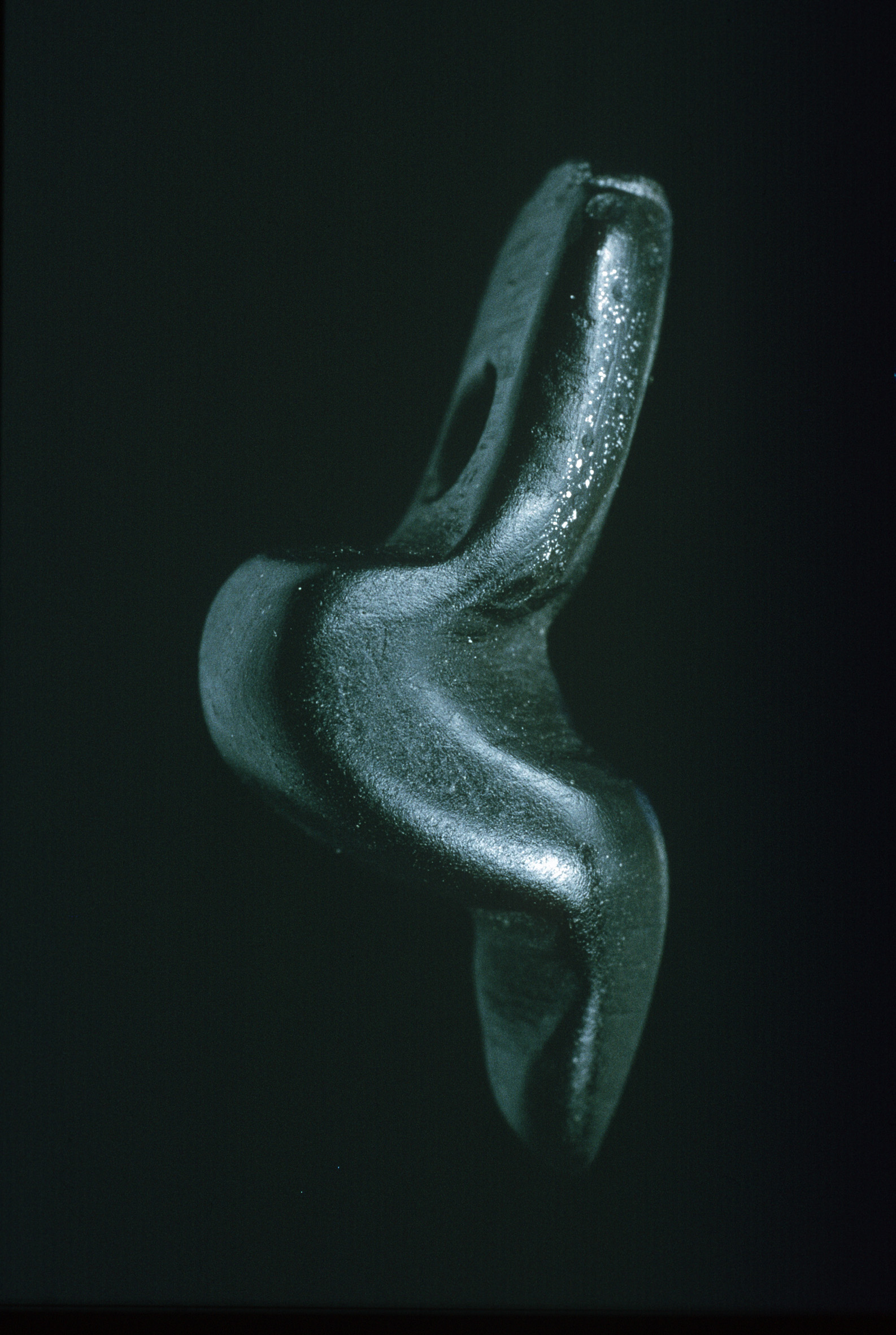
The Venus of Monruz is an 11,000 year-old stylized pendant, 18 mm in height.

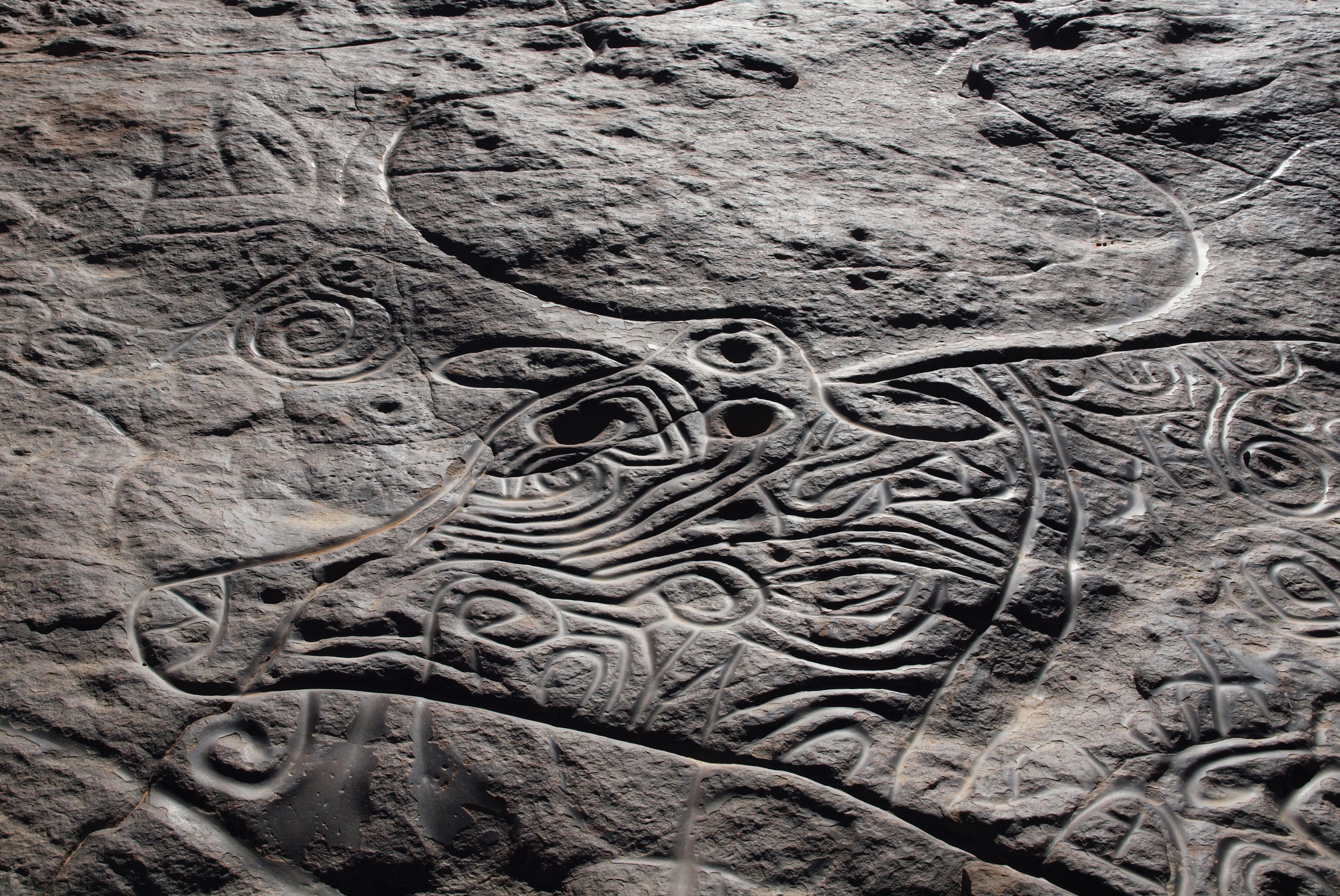
Rock carving of Pelorovis antiquus at Tassili n'Ajjer, southern Algeria

Mesolithic Europe

- 12.5 kya Mammoth spear thrower, a spear thrower carved by the artist into the form of a Mammoth was discovered at the rock shelter of Montastruc, Tarn-et-Garonne, France. It is now exhibited in the British Museum.
- 12 kya Cuciulat cave (Romania) features several red paintings of animals, including horses and felines, which are about 12,000 years old. These were the first manifestations of this kind known in Central Europe.
- 11.5 kya The Shigir Idol, a wooden sculpture, resides in the Historic Exhibition Museum in Yekaterinburg, Russia.
- 11 kya Venus of Monruz (Switzerland)
- 11 kya Les Combarelles (France) – two galleries showcase more than 600 engravings. The more-than-11,000-year-old artwork portrays such subjects as reindeer drinking water from the river that flows through the cave, cave bears, cave lions, mammoths, and various symbols.
- 10-8 kya Magura Cave (Bulgaria) - the prehistoric wall paintings of Magura have great resemblance with those of the Grotta dei Cervi in Italy, which are of exceptional expression and artistic depth and are considered the most significant works of art of the European Post-Paleolithic era. In 1984 the site was added to UNESCO's tentative list of World Heritage.
- 10-5.5 kya Rock art of the Iberian Mediterranean Basin
- 9 kya Elk's Head of Huittinen, sculpture exhibited at the National Museum of Finland.
- 7 kya Adam of Govrlevo (North Macedonia), or "Adam of Macedonia". At more than 7,000 years old, the sculpture is the oldest artifact found in the Republic of North Macedonia. The artist depicts a sitting male body, and shows details of his spine, ribs, navel, and phallus. The piece is now exhibited in the Skopje City Museum.

Epipalaeolithic Near East

- 11 kya Ain Sakhri lovers, a figurine from the Ain Sakhri caves near Bethlehem, is the oldest known representation of humans engaged in sex. It is now displayed in the British Museum.

Mesolithic Asia

- 16 kya Zuojiang Huashan Rock Art features rock paintings on limestone cliff faces in Guangxi, southern China.
- 10 kya Bhimbetka rock shelters (World Heritage Site), Madhya Pradesh, India with rock art ranging from the Mesolithic (c.8,000 BC) to historical times

North African Mesolithic

- Saharan rock art – there are over three thousand known sites where artists carved or painted on the natural rocks of the central Sahara desert.
- Tadrart Acacus (Libya) – rock art with engravings of humans and flora and fauna, which date from 12,000 BCE to 100 CE.
- Tassili n'Ajjer (Algeria) – over 15,000 pastoral and natural engravings; the earliest rock art is from around 12,000 years before present, with most dating to the 9th and 10th millennia BP or younger.

Americas

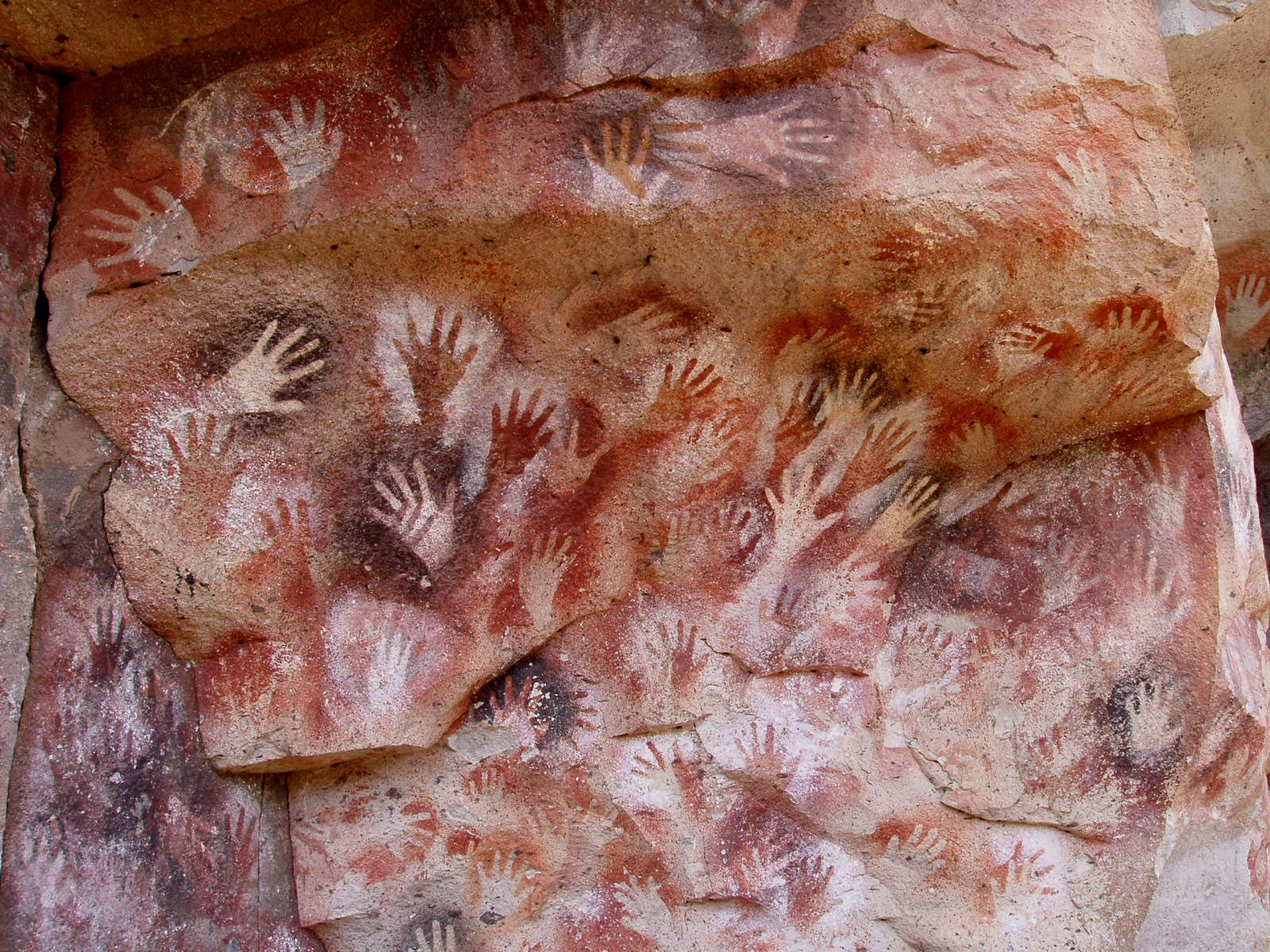
Cueva de las Manos (Cave of Hands), Argentina

- Cueva de las Manos (Cave of Hands) (Argentina) – a series of caves exhibiting hundreds of outlines of human hands, hunting scenes, and animals painted 13,000 to 9,000 years ago.
- Bird stones (5,000 to 2,500 years old) are portable bird-shaped stone sculptures created by generations of North American sculptors.
- Toquepala Caves (Peru) – "Abrigo del Diablo" and the other caves contain at least 50 noted pieces. The artists used paint made from hematite, and painted in seven colors with red being dominant.

== Neolithic ==
Near East and North Africa

- Çatalhöyük (Turkey) – probably the best preserved large Neolithic site, its artwork includes murals, figurines, and depictions of animals. The Seated Woman of Çatalhöyük was found here.
  - Seated Woman of Çatalhöyük is a baked-clay nude female form seated between feline-headed arm-rests which is missing its original head and right side hand rest (although reconstructions of the artist's possible intent have been added). Resides at the Museum of Anatolian Civilizations in Ankara, Turkey.
- Rock art of Figuig (Morocco)
- Rock art of south Oran (Algeria)
- Rock art of the Djelfa region (Algeria)

Neolithic Europe

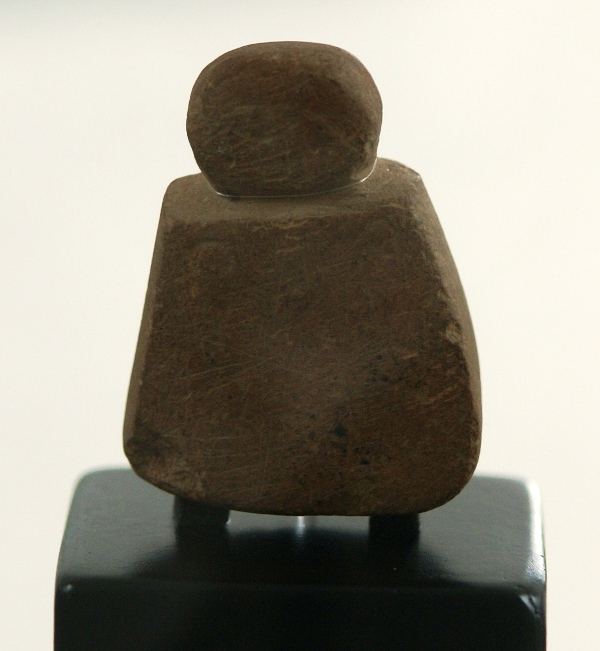
Westray Wife, Orkney, Scotland

- The Alunda moose is a Neolithic artistic stone axe c.2000 B.C. that was found in Uppland, Sweden. It is displayed in the Swedish History Museum.
- Dagenham idol
- Westray Wife
- Folkton Drums
- Rock carvings at Alta (Norway) – artwork includes images of Bear worship.
- Rock art of the Iberian Mediterranean Basin
- List of stone circles
- Stone circles in the British Isles and Brittany

Neolithic China

- Malipo's 4000+ year old 'Great King' pictographs at Wenshan Prefecture, Yunnan, China.

== See also ==
- British Museums' Department of Prehistory and Europe
- Cave painting
- Caves in Cantabria
- Cave of Forgotten Dreams, a 2010 documentary film about Chauvet Cave by Werner Herzog.
- Earliest findings for hominid art
- History of painting
- History of sculpture
- Inside the Neolithic Mind, 2005 book
- International Federation of Rock Art Organizations
- Ochre Processing Workshop
- Parietal art
- Petroglyph#List of petroglyph sites
- Pre-Columbian art in the Americas
- Prehistoric art
  - Rock Art and the Prehistory of Atlantic Europe, 1997 book
  - The Mind in the Cave: Consciousness and the Origins of Art, 2002 book
  - The Thread of Art, 2012 and 2015 book
- Rock art
