= AARS =

AARS or Aars may refer to:

- Aars, a town in Denmark
- Aminoacyl tRNA synthetase (aaRS or ARS), an enzyme
- Association des Amis de l'Art Rupestre Saharien (Association of the Friends of Saharan Rock Art), a French academic organisation
- Paul Aars (1934-2002), an American stock car driver
