= Aryballos =

Type of ancient Greek vase

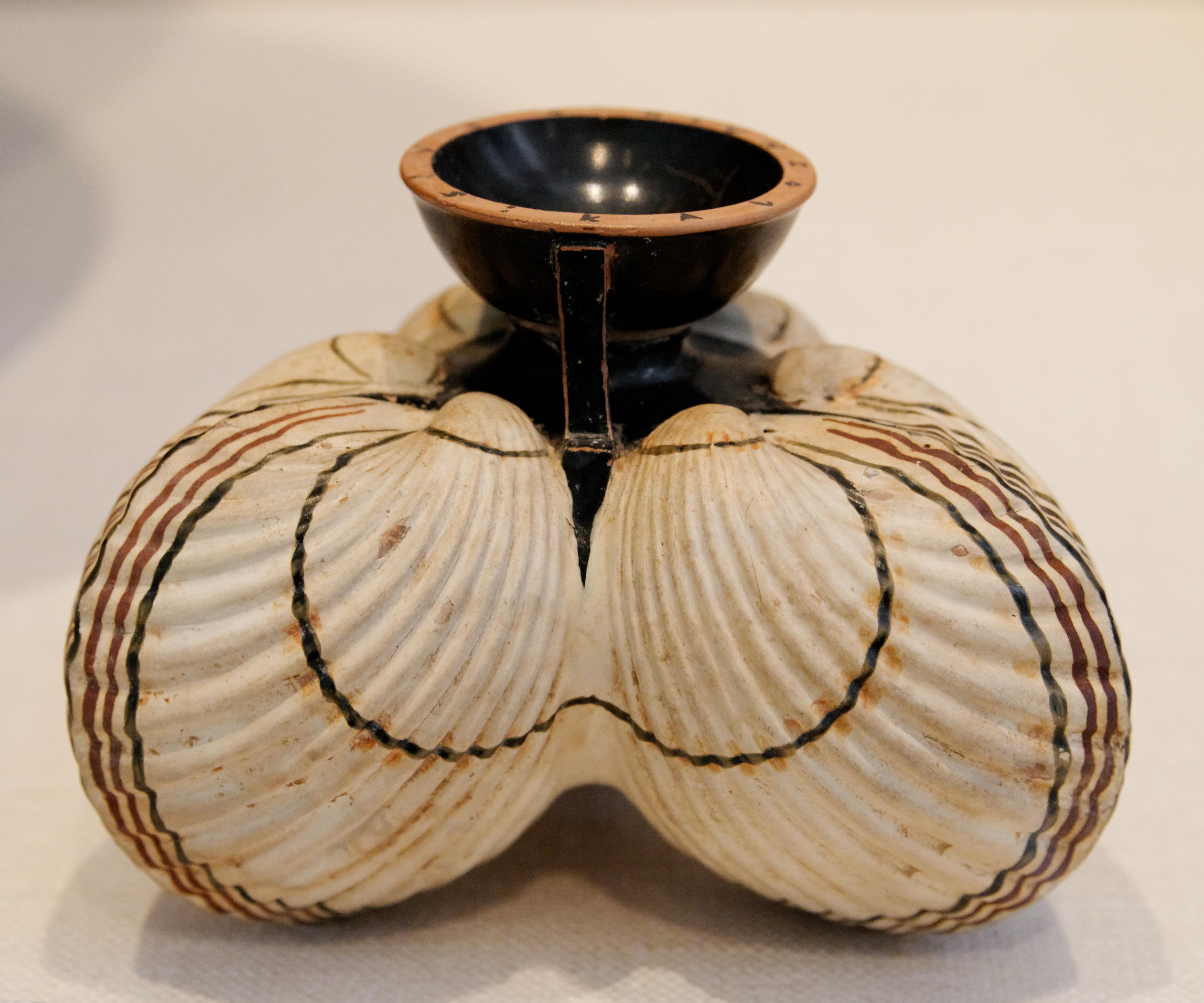
Aryballos in the form of three cockle shells, 6th century BC (Metropolitan Museum of Art)

An aryballos (Greek: ἀρύβαλλος; plural aryballoi) was a small spherical or globular flask with a narrow neck used in Ancient Greece. It was used to contain perfume or oil, and is often depicted in vase paintings being used by athletes during bathing. In these depictions, the vessel is at times attached by a strap to the athlete's wrist or hung by a strap from a peg on the wall. Versions of the aryballos have been found throughout Greece but some of the more preserved versions have been found within the city of Athens.

There are two different versions of aryballoi, the Corinthian version and a version created by Attic potters. The Corinthian version of the aryballos has a rounded base and has one handle which reaches from the shoulder of the base to the lip. The version that was made by Attic potters usually is suited with two handles and has a "bell-shaped mouth". The Attic potter's aryballoi were produced sometime around the end of the 6th century while the Corinthian version of the aryballoi was produced up until the 5th century BC.

Corinthian aryballos were often painted with a large array of vibrant colors including reds, purples, and greens. The aryballos were often decorated with ornaments such as rosettes which gave them such a unique design. Animals ranging from octopuses to large birds can be seen painted on the sides of aryballos. Other aryballoi were shaped into the form of animals (such as owls or hedgehogs) or other symbolic items such as a foot or a hand. The owl-shaped aryballos may have been in relation to the goddess Athena whose main animal symbol was an owl.

While most preserved aryballoi are made of clay, it is hypothesized that some aryballoi were made of leather. Over the thousands of years since they were made, these aryballoi would have decayed away, yet in some versions of art, these vessels are represented as made from leather. This is credited to an image that can be found at the bottom (tondo) of a cup that depicts two adult males and a younger male which the two adults are watching. In the background of this artwork is an aryballos that is hanging which appears to be made of leather. While this is the only depiction of an aryballoi being made of leather, it does give an explanation to why so few have been discovered. This image dates back to c. 500 BC.

Some scholars believe that aryballoi were only used by males, however, there is evidence that aryballoi were used by women as well. Of the 14 pieces of art that depict the use of aryballoi, only one contains a woman using the aryballos. This is on an amphora and was painted by an Andokides painter that dates back to 520 BC. This image depicts a group of women swimming while one uses an aryballos to pour oil into the palm of her hand. Some scholars believe that these women are Amazons who are doing, what would be at the time, a more masculine activity but the use of aryballoi in gender roles is still up for debate.

The shape of the aryballos originally came from the oinochoe of the Geometric period of the 9th century BC, a globe-shaped wine jar. By the Proto-Corinthian period of the following century, it had attained its definitive shape, going from spherical to ovoid to conical, and finally back to spherical. This definitive form has a wide, flat mouth, and a single small handle. Some later variations have bell-shaped mouths, a second handle, and/or a flat base. Potters also created inventive shapes for aryballoi.

The Austrian commission of the Corpus Vasorum Antiquorum is investigating the material properties of these vessels using computed tomography and optical 3D acquisition techniques. Currently, many aryballos are housed within the Metropolitan Museum of Art and within the Acropolis Museum. Within these museums, many aryballoi are put on display for the public to see. The examples of aryballoi in these museums are aged somewhere between 500-600 BC.

== Gallery ==
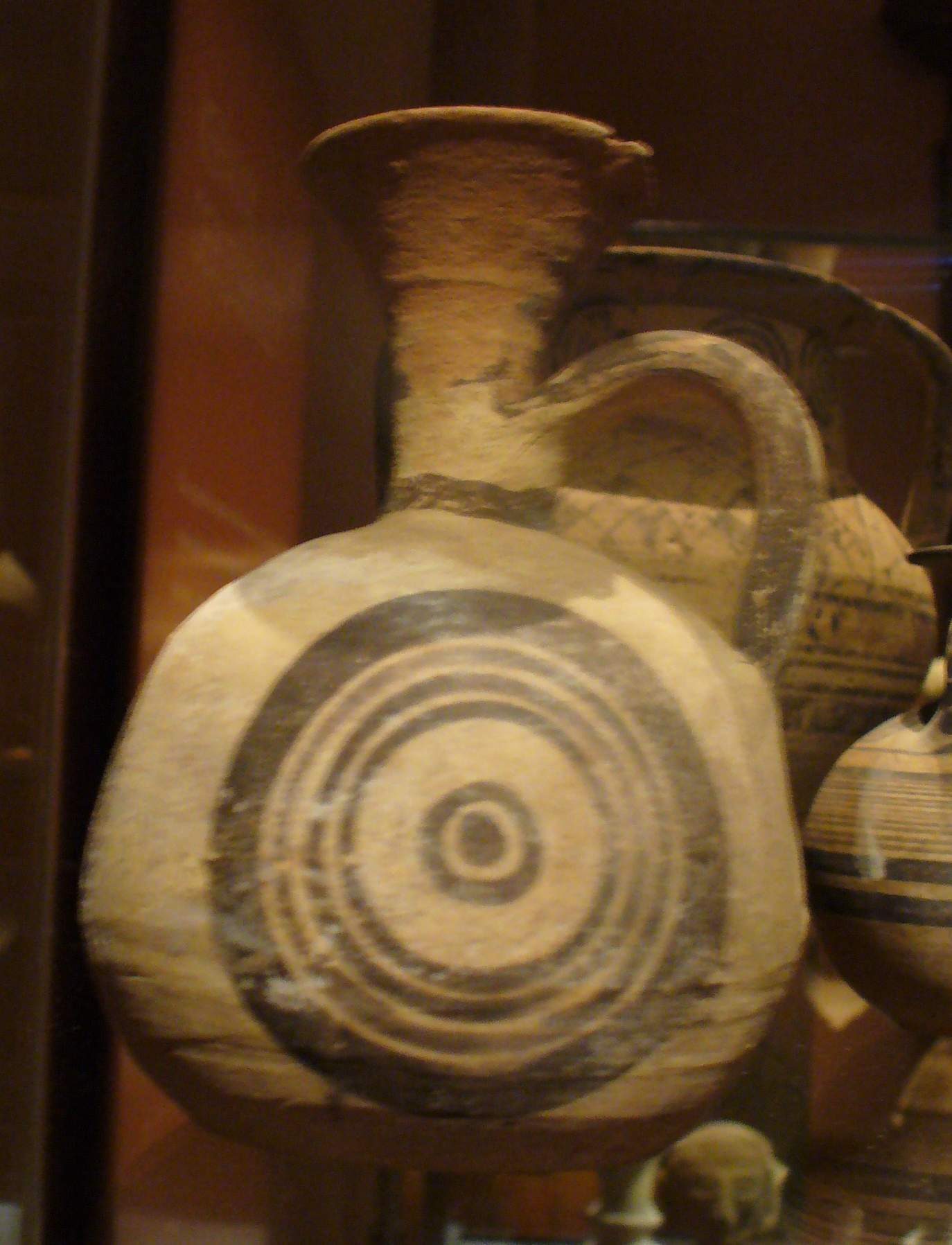
Cypriotic geometric white painted ware, 850–750 BC

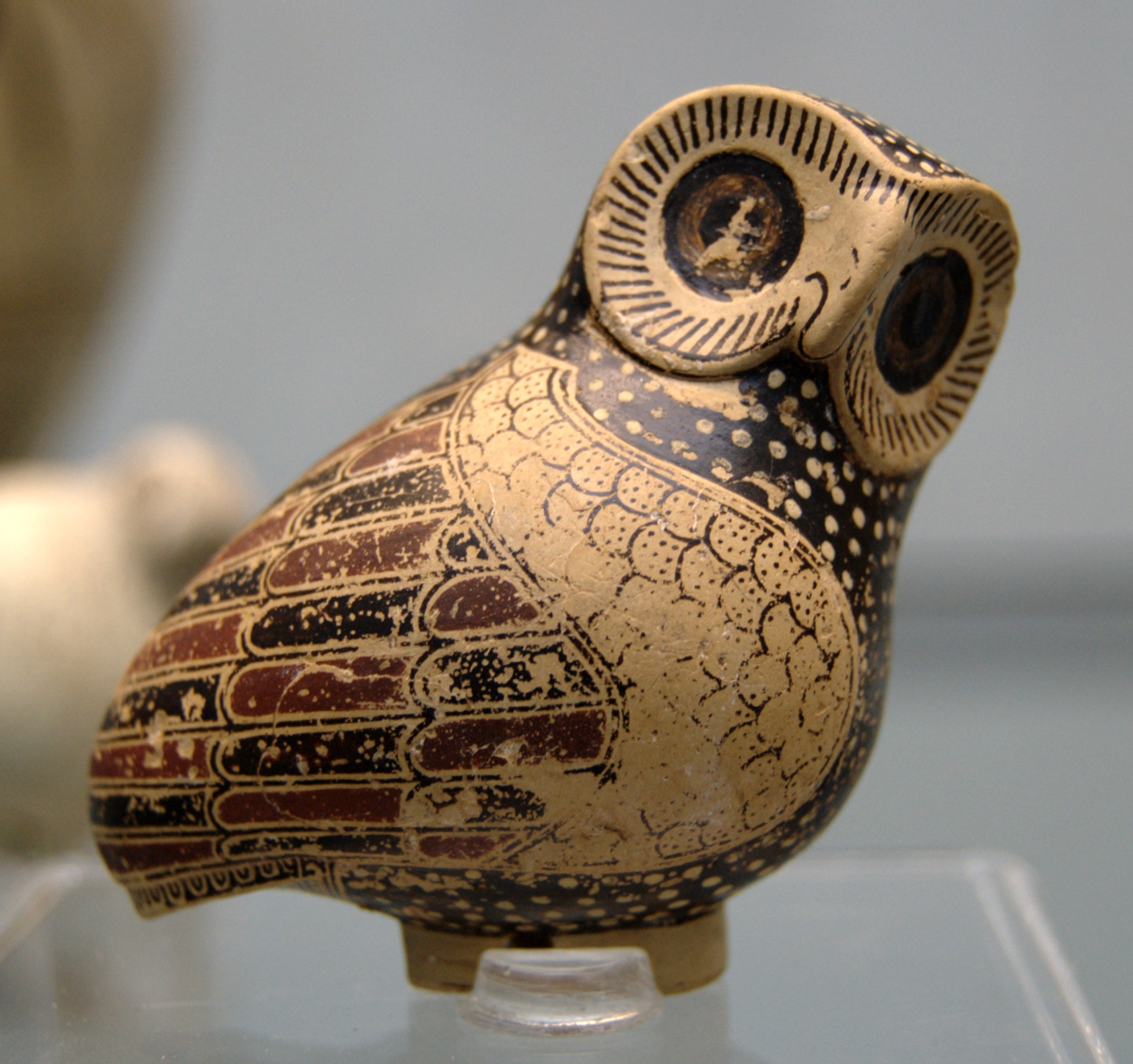
Owl-shaped, Proto-Corinthian, 630 BC

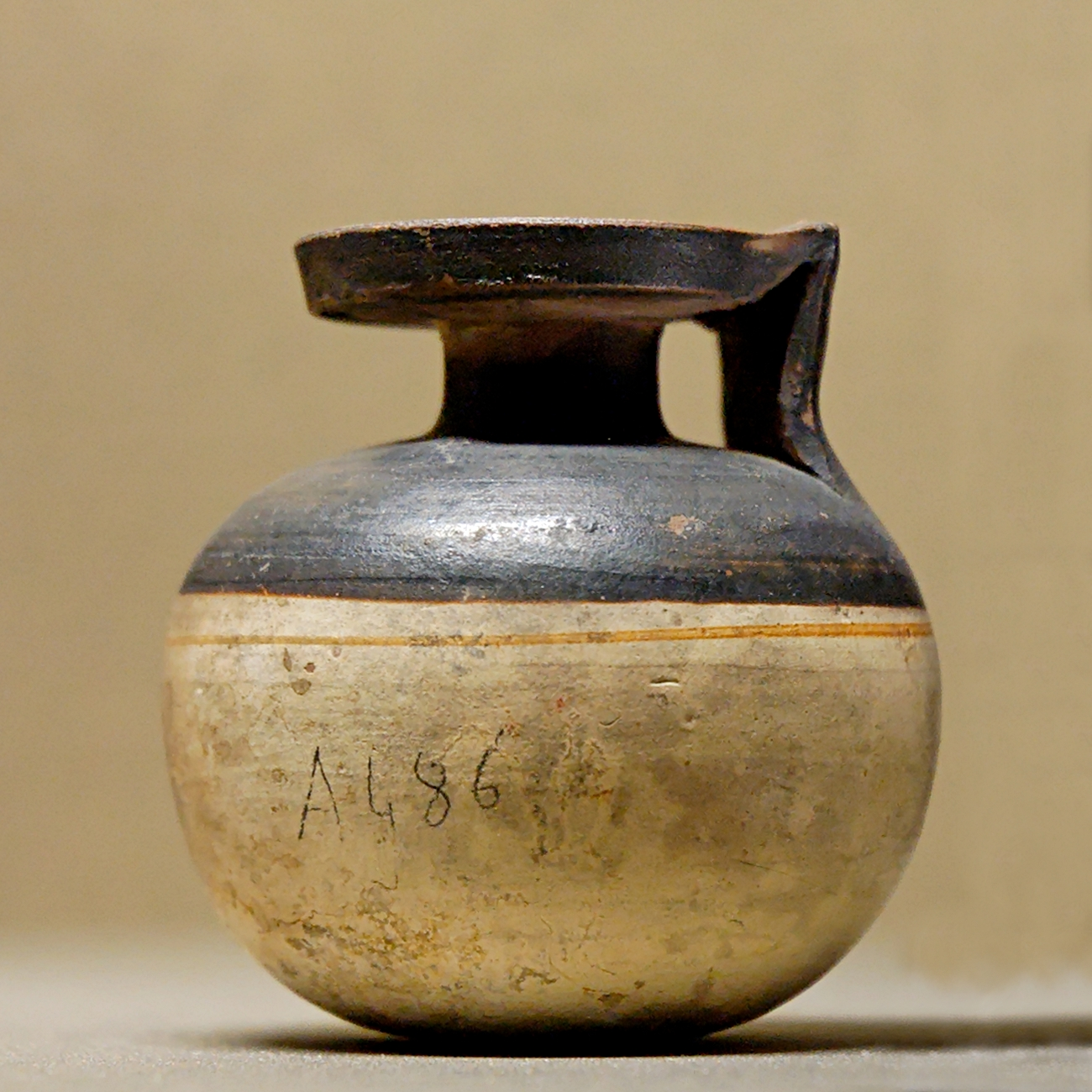
575–550 BC (Louvre)

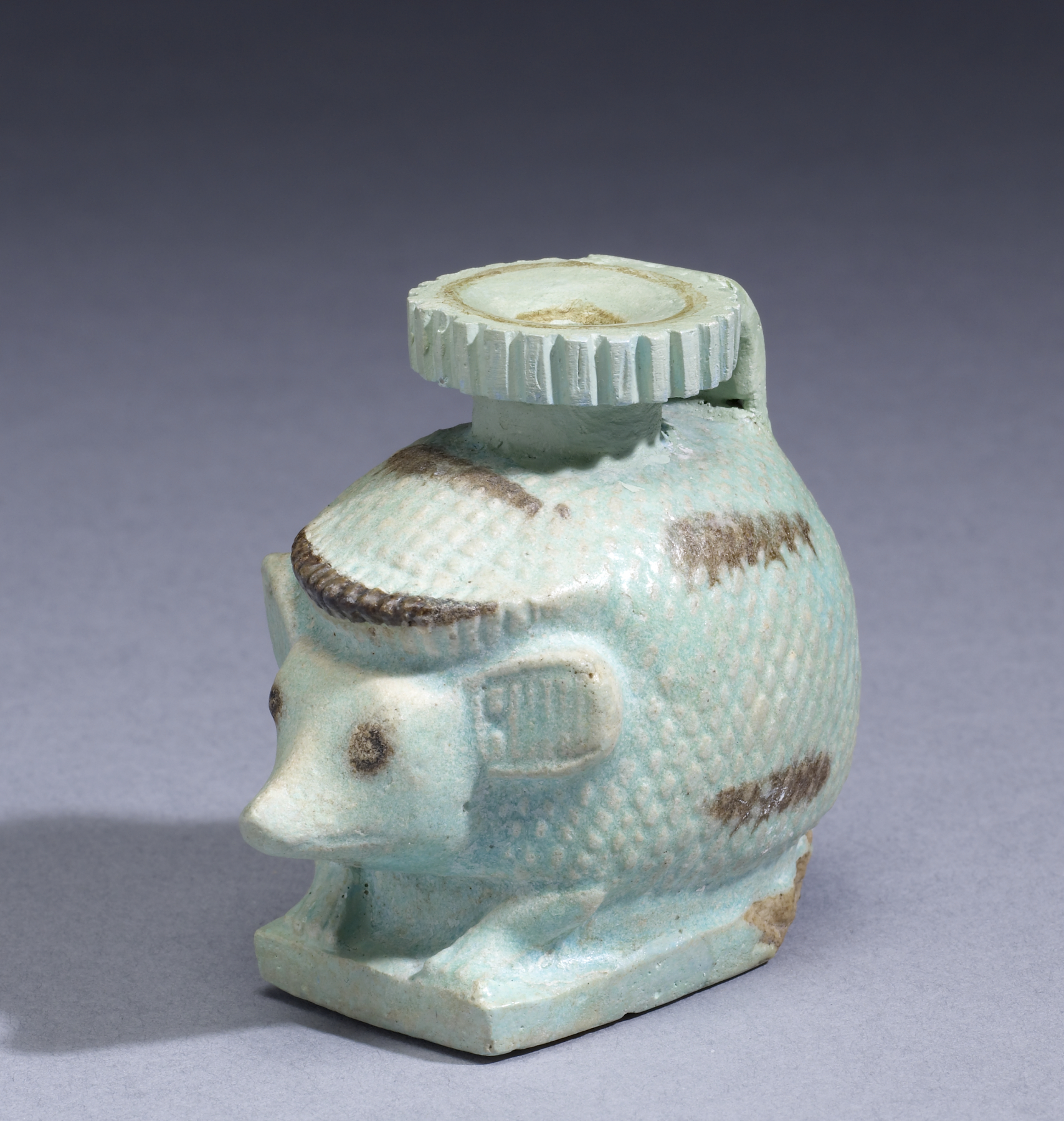
Greco-Egyptian faience hedgehog, 6th century BC

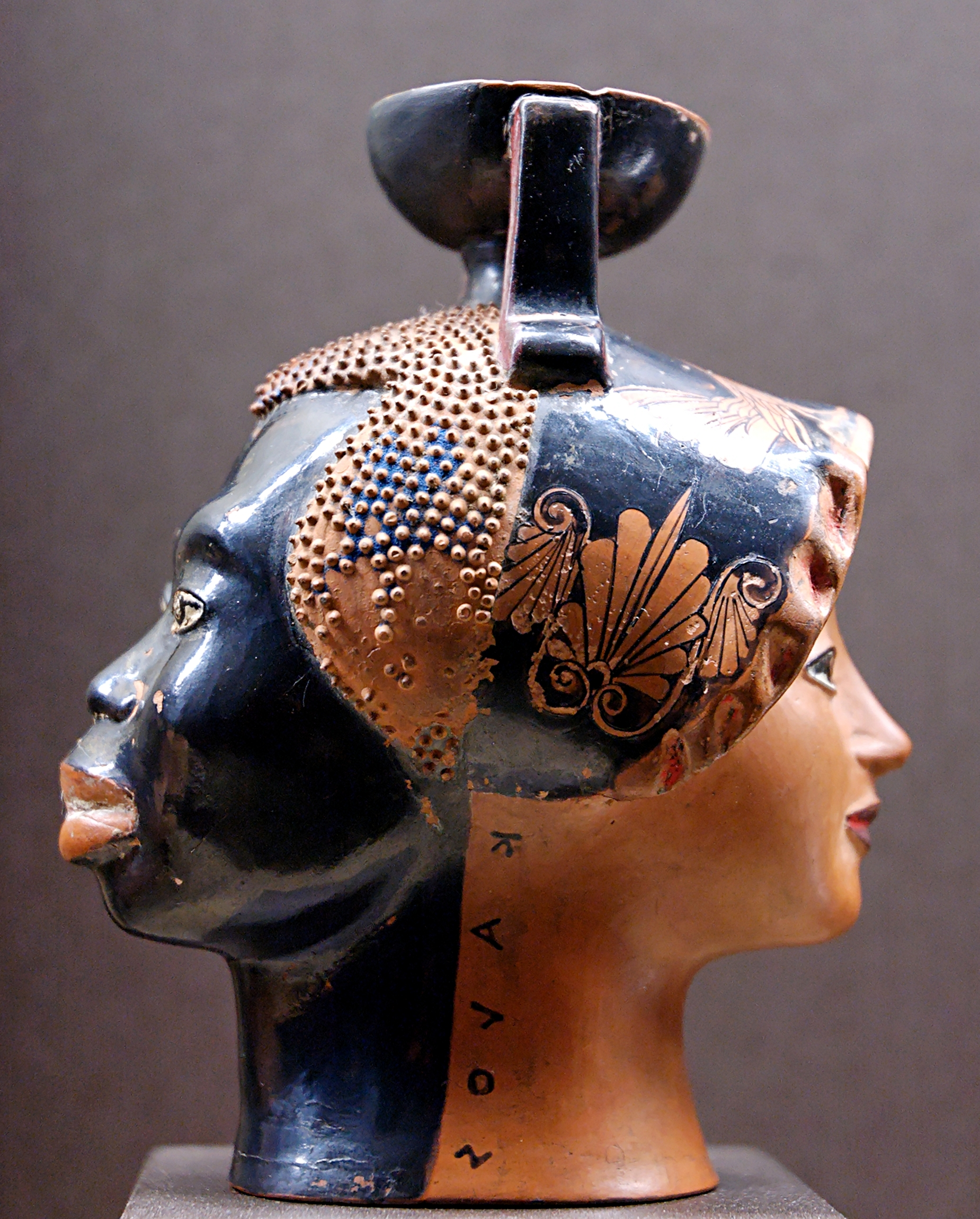
Janiform with kalos inscription, 520 BC

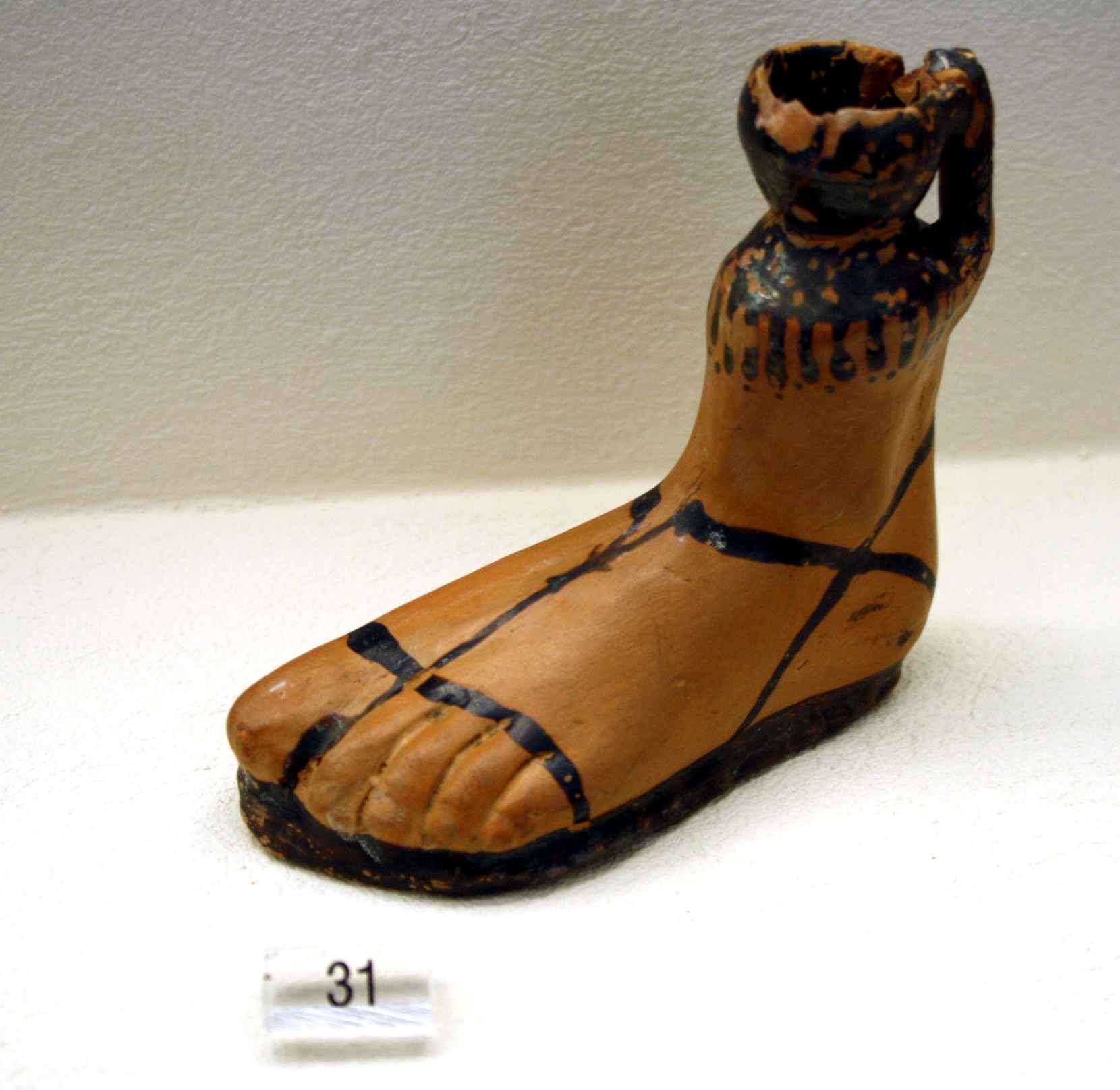
Foot-shaped, c. 500 BC

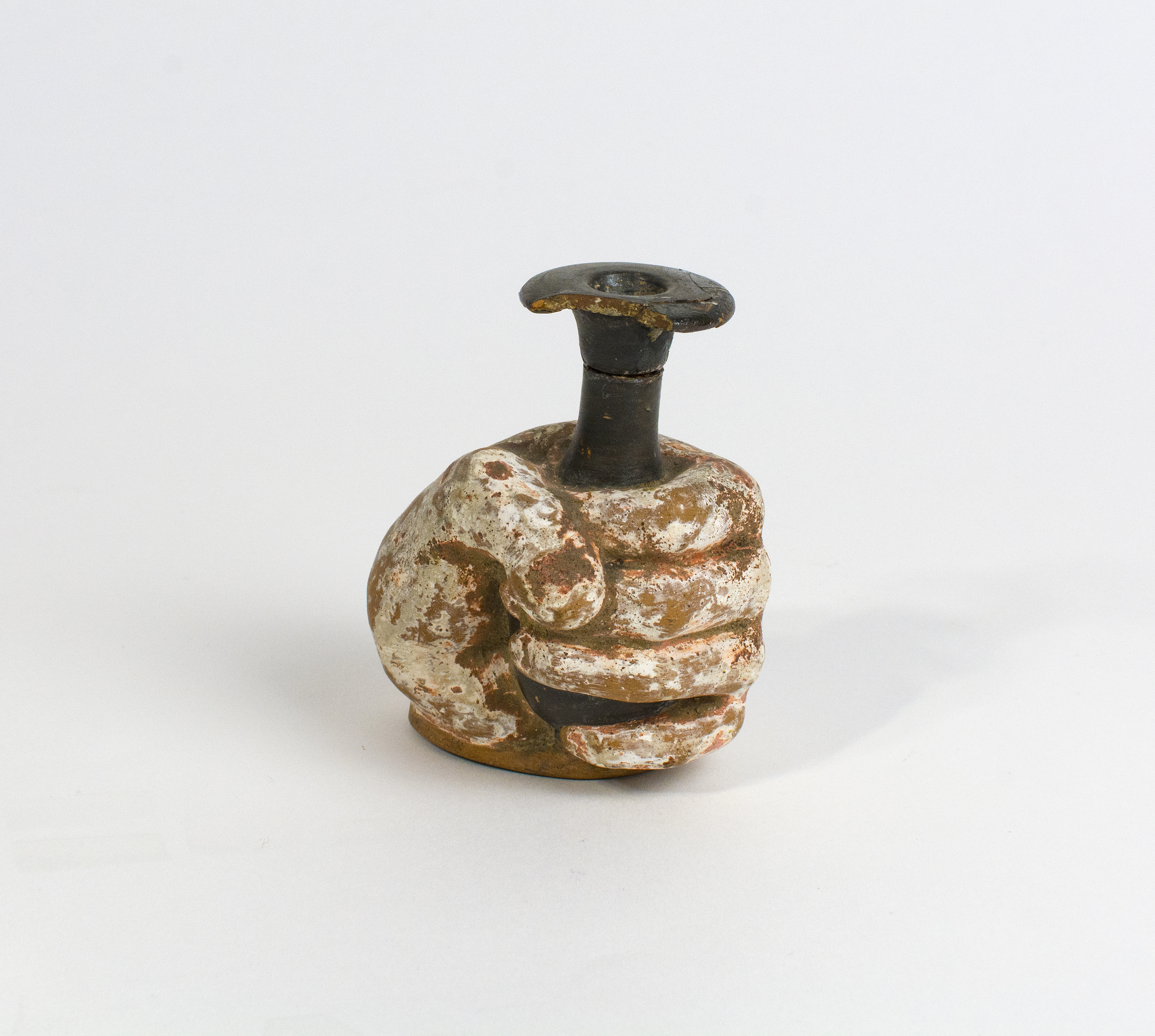
Hand-shaped, Hunt Museum

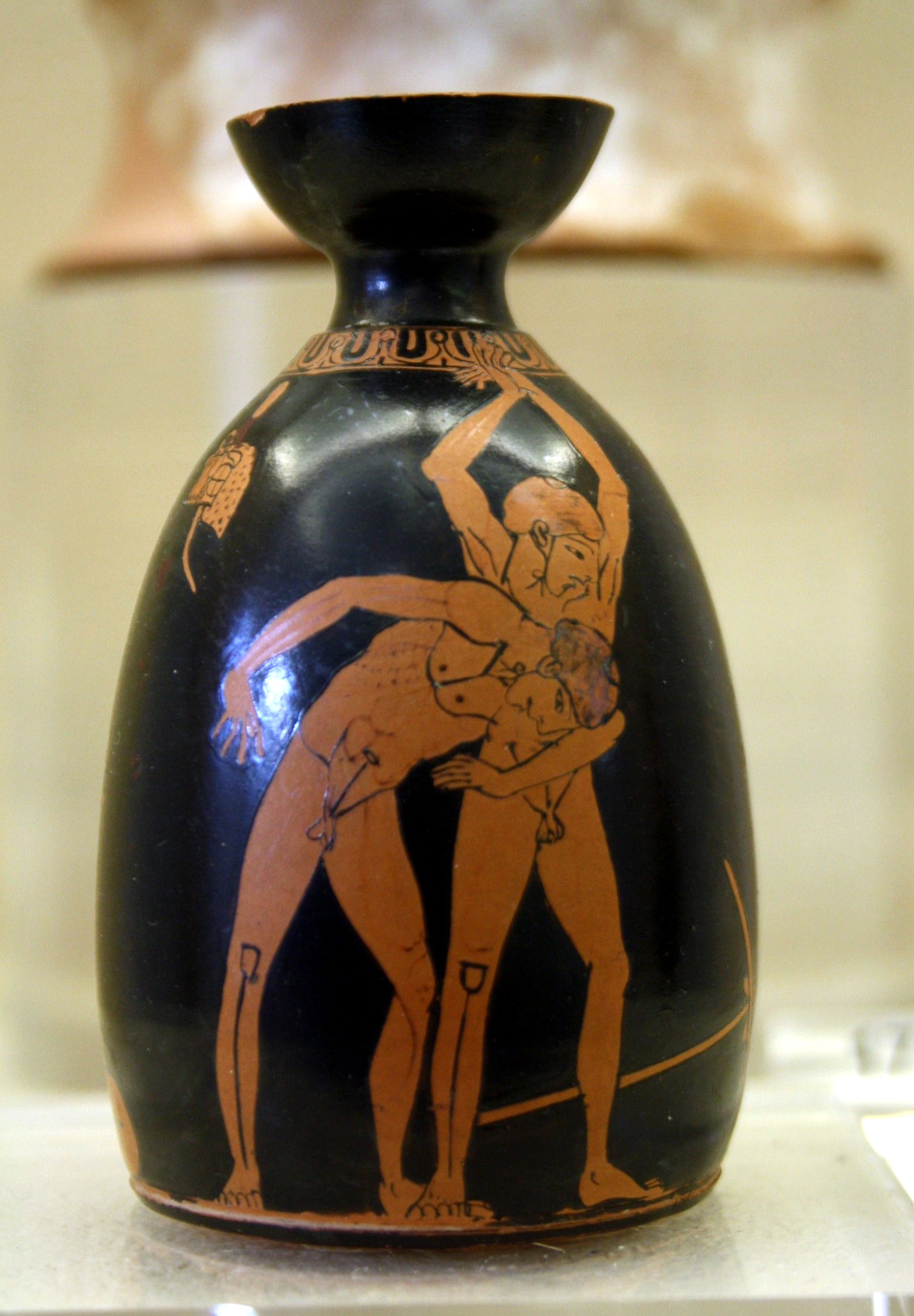
Two ephebes wrestling, 490–480 BC

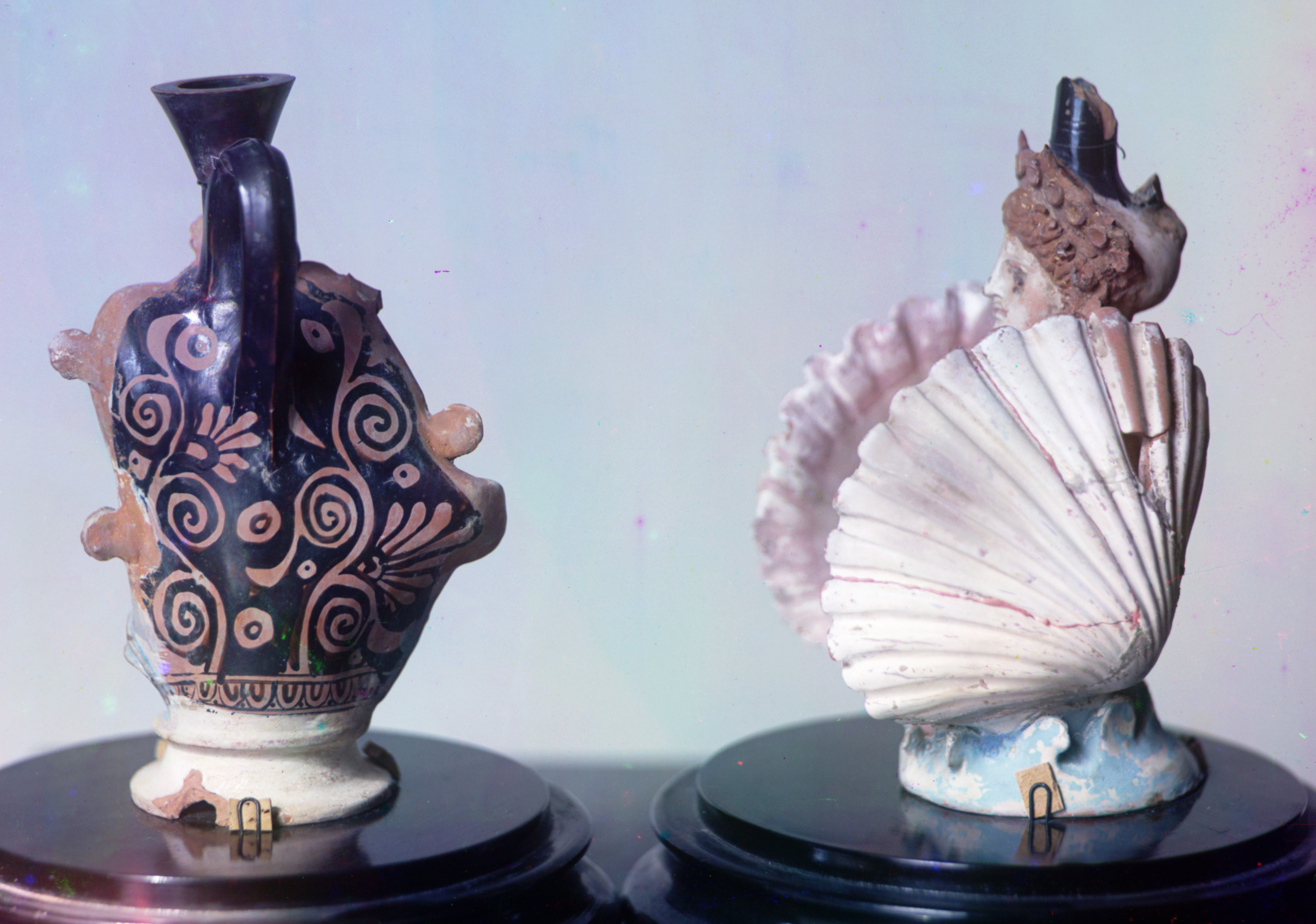
Ancient Etruscan "aryballoi" terracotta vessels unearthed in the 1860s at Bolzhaya Bliznitsa tumulus near Phanagoria, South Russia (then part of the Bosporan Kingdom of Cimmerian Bosporus); on exhibit at the Hermitage Museum in Saint Petersburg.

== See also ==
- Ancient Greek vase painting
- Pottery of ancient Greece
- Unguentarium
