= Lespugue =

- Commune
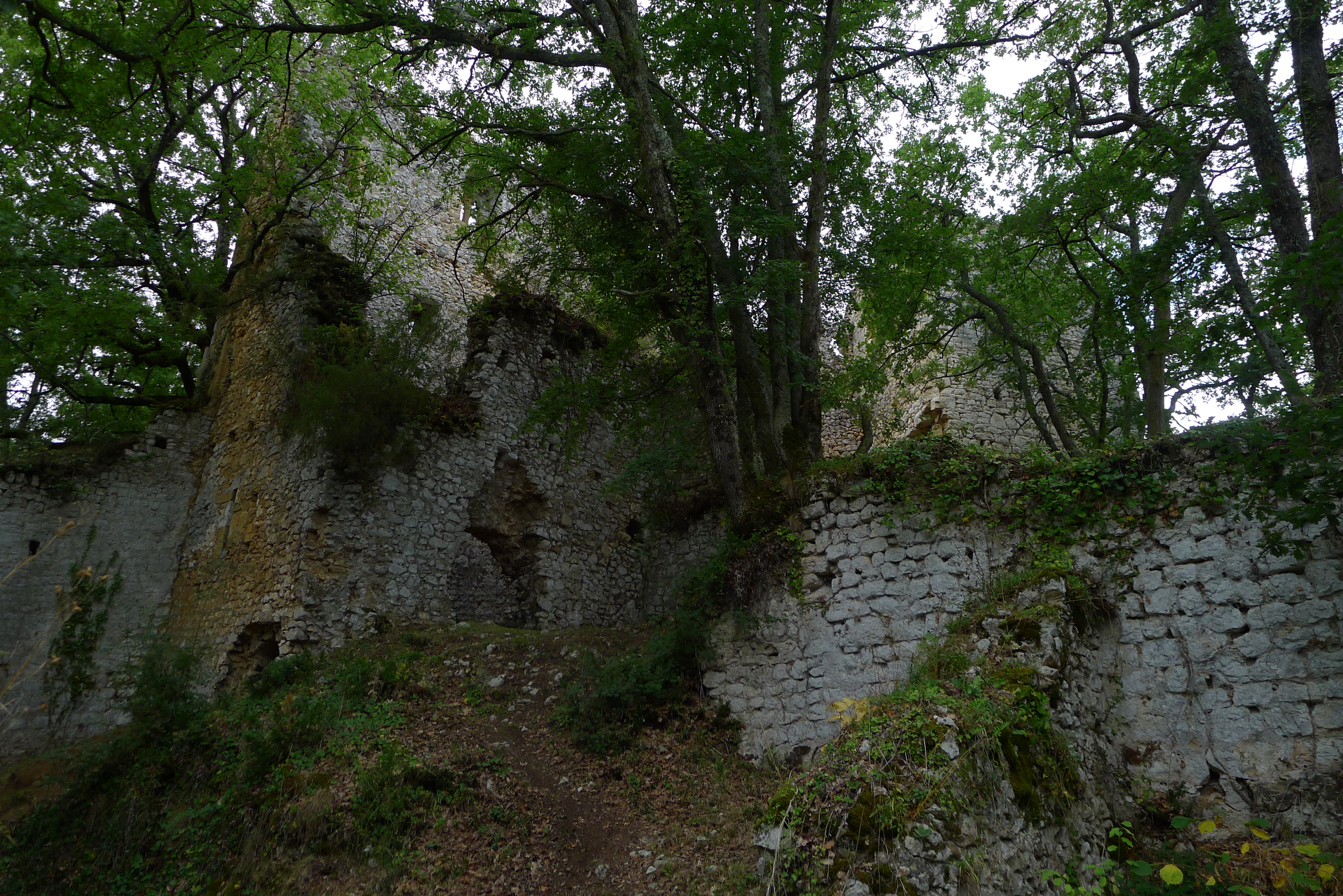
- Ruins of the medieval castle
- Location of Lespugue
- Location within France Location within Occitanie
- Coordinates: 43°14′00″N 0°40′03″E
- Country: France
- Region: Occitania
- Department: Haute-Garonne
- Arrondissement: Saint-Gaudens
- Canton: Saint-Gaudens

Government
  - Mayor (2020–2026): Jean-François Foix
- Area^{1}: 4.91 km^{2} (1.90 sq mi)
- Elevation: 384 m (1,260 ft)
- Highest elevation: 446 m (1,463 ft)
- Lowest elevation: 281 m (922 ft)
- Population (2023): 75
  - Density: 15/km^{2} (40/sq mi)
- Time zone: UTC+01:00 (CET)
  - Summer (DST): UTC+02:00 (CEST)
- INSEE/Postal code: 31295 /31350
- ^{1} French Land Register data, which excludes lakes, ponds, glaciers > 1 km^{2} (0.386 sq mi or 247 acres) and river estuaries.

Lespugue (French pronunciation: [lɛspyɡ]; Occitan: Era Espuga) is a commune in the Haute-Garonne department in southwestern France.

== Population ==
Historical population
Year	Pop.	±% p.a.
1968	137	—
1975	108	−3.34%
1982	107	−0.13%
1990	84	−2.98%
1999	83	−0.13%
2007	76	−1.10%
2012	76	+0.00%
2017	81	+1.28%
2023	75	−1.27%
Source: INSEE

== See also ==
- Venus of Lespugue
- Communes of the Haute-Garonne department
