= International Federation of Rock Art Organizations =

Rock art protection and preservation organization

The International Federation of Rock Art Organizations (IFRAO) is a coordinating body of 60 organizations concerned with prehistoric rock art.

== History ==
The IFRAO was formed in Darwin, Australia on 3 September 1988, during the first major international academic conference dedicated entirely to the study of prehistoric rock art. Nine rock art organizations formed this international federation of independent national or regional bodies. At the founding meeting, it was decided that IFRAO should be a common forum and initiator of policies, projecting or representing the common interests of member organizations without interfering in their autonomy. It would operate as a democratic advisory body in which each member organization would hold one vote, exercised by an official representative. International meetings would be held by nominating suitable rock art conferences as official IFRAO congresses at regular intervals.

Over the subsequent twelve years, the number of affiliate members quadrupled to almost 40, and the current 60 members of IFRAO cover most of the world. The combined memberships of these organizations include about 9,000 rock art specialists, which is practically all such specialists in the world.

Until the late 1980s, individual rock art researchers as well as rock art organizations around the world operated largely without being aware of the work conducted in other parts of the world — sometimes even in their own country or region of activity. As a result, the discipline experienced a great diversity of research approaches and terminology, reflected in a multitude of idiosyncratic constructs, sequences, chronologies, names and definitions. Therefore, one of IFRAO’s initial principal concerns was the standardization of those aspects of the discipline that are essential for effective communication and collaboration: methodology, terminology, ethics, and the technical standards used in analysis and recording. These subjects were addressed through extensive consultation of specialists and, where appropriate, the deliberations of appointed subcommittees.

== Objectives ==
The IFRAO members produce about twenty specialist periodicals, whose flagship is Rock Art Research, the official organ of the federation. IFRAO has been particularly effective in the area of rock art protection and preservation, achieving sometimes spectacular successes, such as the electoral defeat of recalcitrant Portuguese governments in 1995 and 2002. Subsequently IFRAO secured the preservation and return to Aborigines of the reputedly largest rock art gallery in the world, in the Dampier Archipelago of Western Australia, against bitter opposition from the State Government and 18 multinational companies. Thus the federation has become the principal international body pursuing the conservation of prehistoric rock art effectively. Another of its greatest achievements to date has been its successful campaign of empowering traditional indigenous societies to secure the return of rock art sites into their care and possession.

== Members ==
- American Committee to Advance the Study of Petroglyphs and Pictographs
- American Rock Art Research Association
- American Centre of Prehistoric Art Study
- Anisa, Verein für Alpine Forschung (Austria)
- Archivo Nacional de Arte Rupestre – Venezuela
- Armenian Centre of Prehistoric Art Study
- Asociación Arqueológica Viguesa (Spain)
- Asociación Cultural ‘Colectivo Barbaón’ (Spain)
- Asociación Cultural ‘Instituto de Estudios Prehistóricos (ACINEP)’ (Spain)
- Asociación Mexicana de Arte Rupestre, A.C. (AMARAC) (Mexico)
- Amics Valltorta Gassulla (Spain)
- Asociación de Estudios del Arte Rupestre de Cochabamba (Bolivia)
- Association Isturitz & Oxocelhaya – Arts & Sciences (France)
- Asociación Peruana de Arte Rupestre (Peru)
- Associação Brasileira de Arte Rupestre
- Associação Portuguesa de Arte e Arqueologia Rupestre
- Association des Amis de l’Art Rupestre Saharien
- Association de Sauvegarde, d’Etude et de Recherche pour le patrimoine naturel et culturel du Centre-Var (France)
- Association Marocaine de l’Art Rupestre (Morocco)
- Association pour le Rayonnement de l’Art Rupestre Européen (France)
- Australian Rock Art Research Association
- Bangudae Forum (South Korea)
- Cave Art Research Association (Australia)
- Centro Camuno di Studi Preistorici (Italy)
- Centro de Investigación de Arte Rupestre del Uruguay
- Centro Regional de Arte Rupestre, Murcia (Spain)
- Centro Europeu de Investigação da Pré-História do Alto Ribatejo (Portugal)
- Centro Studi e Museo d’Arte Preistorica (Italy)
- China Rock Art Academy
- Comité de Investigación del Arte Rupestre de la Sociedad Argentina de Antropologia
- Deutsche Gesellschaft für Petroikonologie e. V. (Germany)
- East African Rock Art Research Association
- Eastern States Rock Art Research Association (USA)
- Finnish Society for Prehistoric Art
- Grupo de Investigación de Arte Rupestre Indigena (Cuba)
- Hellenic Rock Art Centre (Greece)
- Horn Heritage Organisation (Somalia)
- Indonesian Association of Rock Art
- Instituto de Investigación de Arqueología y Antropología ‘Kuelap’ (Peru)
- Institutum Canarium
- Japan Petrograph Society
- Mid-America Geographic Foundation, Inc. (USA)
- Moscow Centre of Rock Art and Bioindication Research
- National Museums and Monuments of Zimbabwe
- Negev Rock Art Center (Israel)
- Nevada Rock Art Foundation
- North China Rock Art Research Institute
- Northern Cape Rock Art Trust (South Africa)
- Prehistory Society of Zimbabwe
- Rock Art Association of Manitoba (Canada)
- Rock Art Centre of Juci Mountain (China)
- Rock Art Research Association of China
- Rock Art Society of India (RASI)
- Siberian Association of Prehistoric Art Researches
- Sociedad de Investigación del Arte Rupestre de Bolivia
- Società Cooperativa Archeologica Le Orme dell’Uomo (Italy)
- Societé Préhistorique Ariège-Pyrénées (France)
- Tadjik Centre for the Study of Petroglyphs
- Trust for African Rock Art (Kenya)
- Upper Midwest Rock Art Research Association (USA)

== See also ==
- Petroglyph
- Rock art
- List of Stone Age art
- Rupestreweb. Latin American Rock Art Research
