= Bird stone =

Type of prehistoric Native American stone carving

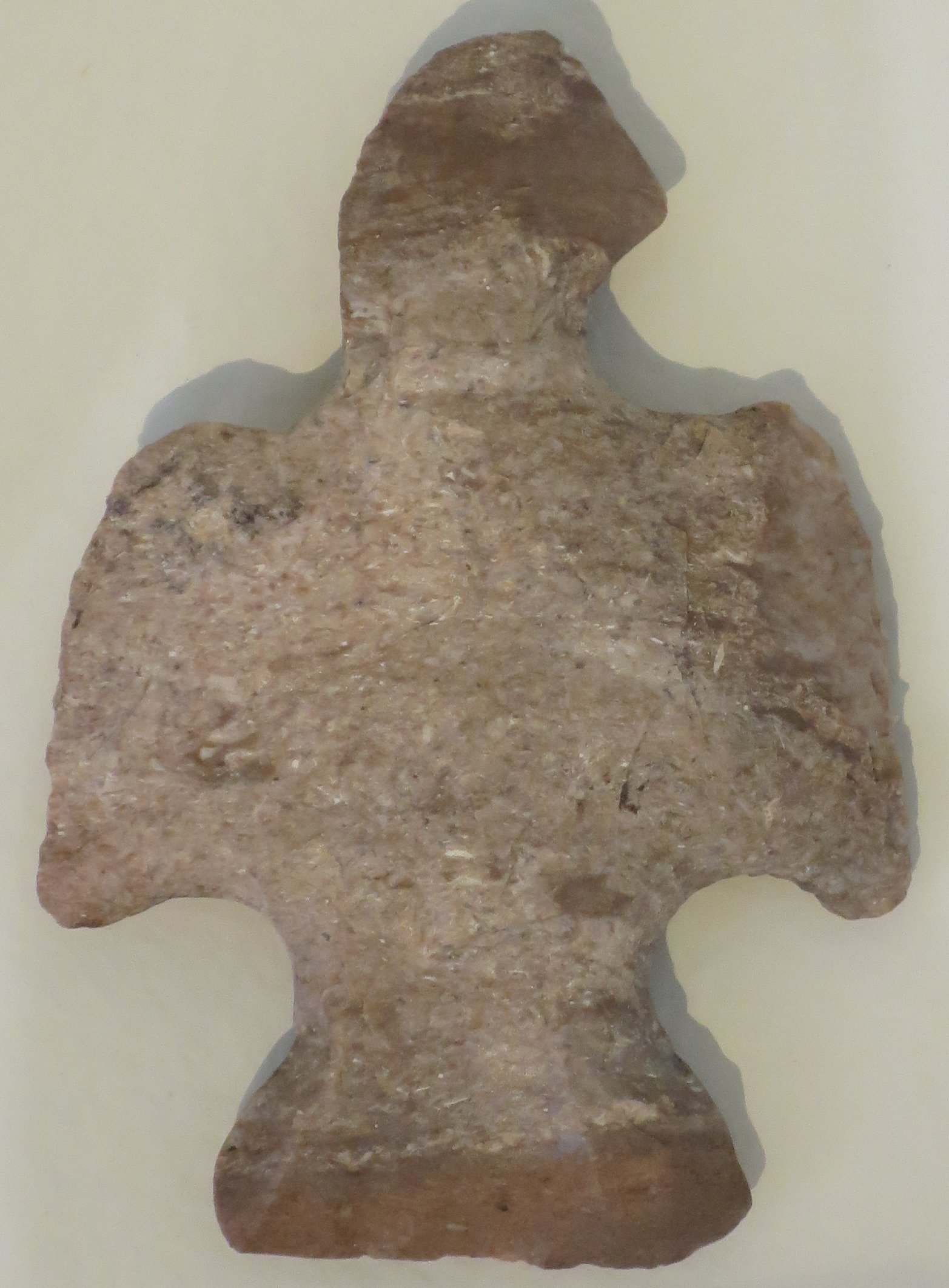
Native American bird-shaped, flaked, banded, light brown stone in the Honolulu Museum of Art

Bird stones are prehistoric, abstract roughly bird-shaped stone carvings made by Native Americans. The artifacts were a common inclusion in graves and thought to have ceremonial importance. They first appeared in the middle Archaic period around 5,000 years ago and continued into the early Woodland period to about 2,500 years before present.

The exact purpose of these artifacts is not known, but most have a small hole drilled at the base of the neck and another at the aft end, presumably for mounting. Some theories suggest they were part of an atlatl (a short rod to hurl spears), in addition to their ceremonial uses. A new theory recently arising from an amateur archaeologist focused on Native American fiber processing, is the bird stone was a tool used for mat-making and weaving. Many stones have been found near waterways and swamp areas where reeds grow, these areas being where materials for mat-making were collected and processed. The holes in the base were potentially used for reed straighteners, or even twine making. The smooth surface of the stone is perfect for flattening fibers without breaking and the beak feature used to push reeds together. Mats were an important facet of every household and important items of trade.

The Pacific Northwest tribes used a similar tool made of wood, also bird shaped. It has also been suggested that these artifacts were worn as decorative items denoting marriage status or pregnancy, and as totems representing tribes.

Bird stones were mostly made east of the Mississippi, and the thousands in existence have been found primarily in New York, Ohio, Michigan and Wisconsin. The stones range in length from 1 to 9 inches (2.5 to 22.9 cm), and have unique variations in style. Most are ground from grayish green, banded slate, and occasionally porphyry.

== See also ==
- List of Stone Age art
- Prehistoric art
