= Venus of Lespugue =

Paleolithic venus

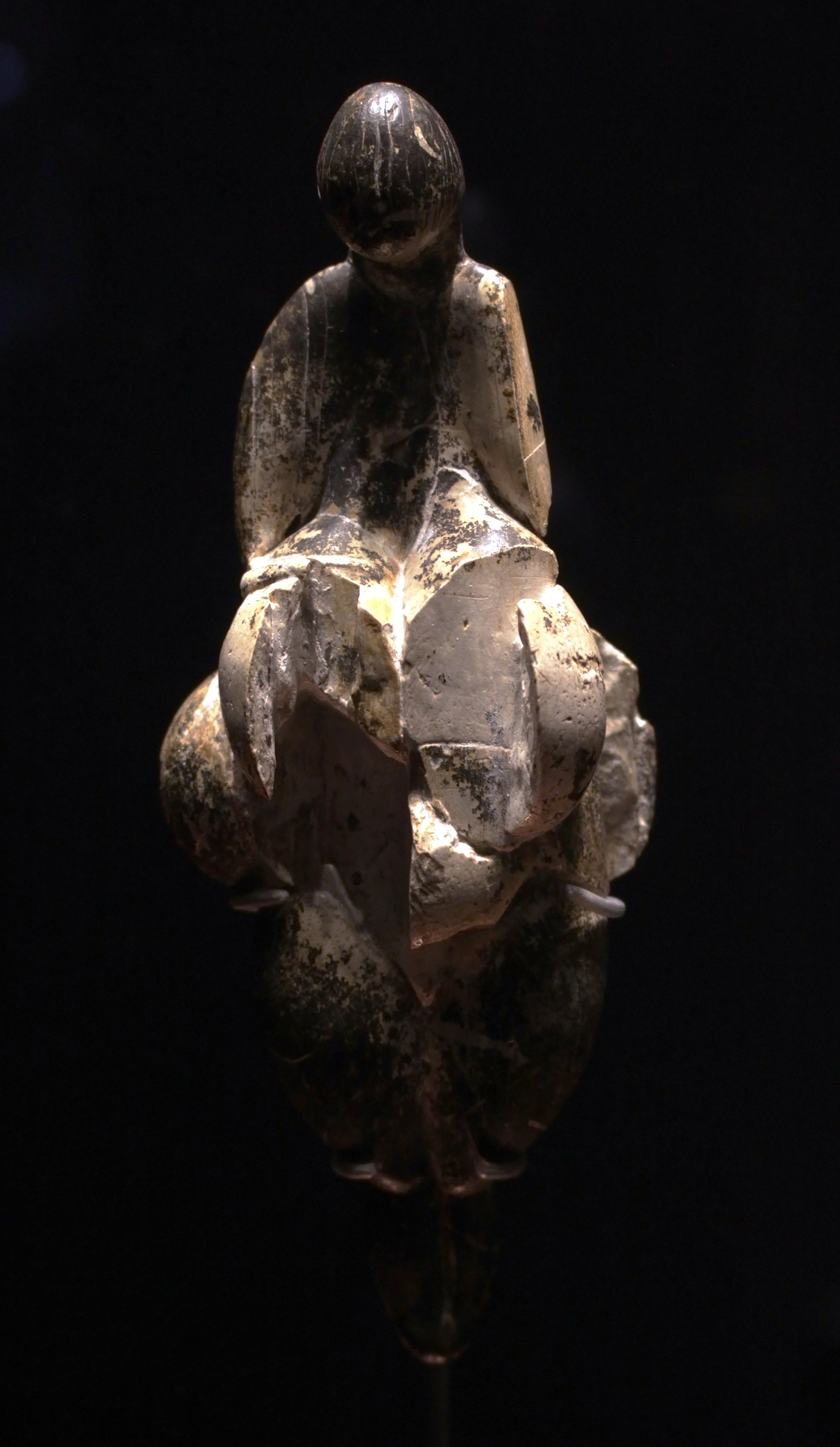
- Venus of Lespugue, Musée de l'Homme, Paris
- Created: 26,000-24,000 BP
- Discovered: Lespugue (Haute-Garonne), France

Location

The Venus of Lespugue is a Venus figurine, a statuette of a female figure of the Gravettian, dated to between 26,000 and 24,000 years ago.

== Discovery ==
It was discovered in 1922 in the Rideaux cave of Lespugue (Haute-Garonne) in the foothills of the Pyrenees by René de Saint-Périer (1877-1950).

Approximately 6 inches (150 mm) tall, it is carved from tusk ivory, and was damaged during excavation.

== Features ==
Of all the steatopygous Venus figurines discovered from the Upper Paleolithic, the Venus of Lespugue, if the reconstruction is sound, appears to display the most exaggerated female secondary sexual characteristics, especially the extremely large, pendulous breasts.

According to textile expert Elizabeth Wayland Barber, the statue displays the earliest representation found of spun thread, as the carving shows a skirt hanging from below the hips, made of twisted fibers, frayed at the end.

== Location ==
The Venus of Lespugue is kept in Paris, at the Musée de l'Homme.

== See also ==
- Art of the Upper Paleolithic
- List of Stone Age art
- Venus figurine
