= Association des Amis de l'Art Rupestre Saharien =

Association des Amis de l'Art Rupestre Saharien (Association of the Friends of Saharan Rock Art) is a French scientific organisation focusing on the rock art of the Sahara. It was established in 1991.

The chairman is Jean-Loïc Le Quellec, an academic at the French National Centre for Scientific Research.

The organisation publishes two journals:

- La Lettre de l'AARS (semi-annual) ISSN 1633-3691
- Cahiers de l'AARS (annual) ISSN 1627-2773

The AARS is a member of the International Federation of Rock Art Organizations.
