= Gabarnmung =

Archaeological site in Australia's Northern Territory Australia

- Nawarla Gabarnmung
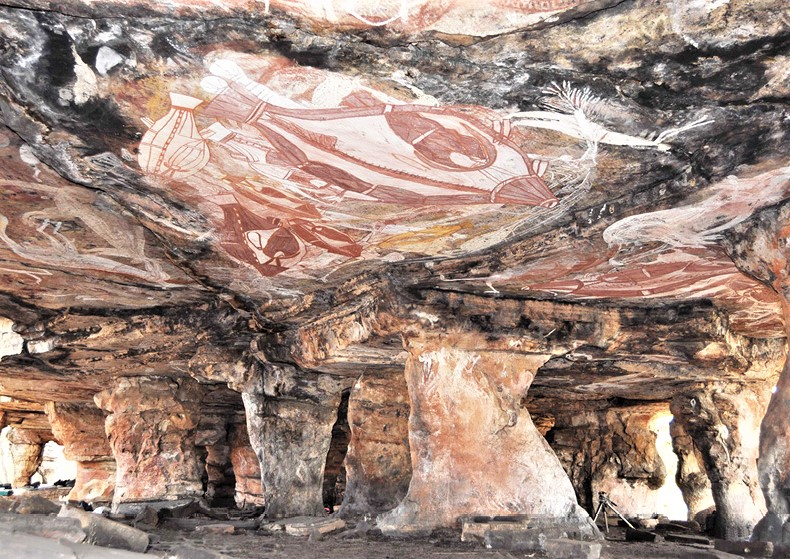
- Gabarnmang Cave

- location in Australia Gabarnmung (Australia)
- 12°10′6.6″S 133°50′0.6″E
- Associated with: Indigenous Australians
- Location: south-western Arnhem Land, Top End, Northern Territory
- Region: Australia

Site notes
- Excavation dates: 2010
- Archaeologists: Bruno David, Jean-Michel Geneste, Jean-Jacques Delanoy, Bryce Barker

Gabarnmung (or Nawarla Gabarnmung, Jawoyn for "(place of) hole in the rock") is an archaeological and rock art site in south-western Arnhem Land, in the Top End of Australia’s Northern Territory. Habitation of the site has been dated to at least 44,000 years ago, placing it among the oldest radiocarbon dated sites in Australia (known older sites, such as the nearby Madjedbebe, are dated stratigraphically). The oldest rock art was produced more than 28,000 years ago, making it the oldest securely dated prehistoric art in Australia. The cave was still visited by members of the Jawoyn within living memory, possibly until as late as the 1950s, but its existence had been forgotten until its 2006 rediscovery.

== Description ==
Gabarnmung lies at a remote location on the traditional lands of the Jawoyn people, east of Kakadu National Park, and about 35 km (22 mi) west of Maningrida, Northern Territory. The rock shelter was constructed by tunneling into a naturally eroded cliff face that created a 19 m × 19 m (62 ft × 62 ft) sub-horizontal ceiling ranging in height from 1.75 to 2.45 m (5.7 to 8.0 ft) above floor level, the roof is supported by 36 pillars created by the natural erosion of fissure lines in the bedrock. Investigation has shown that some pre-existing pillars were removed, some were reshaped and some moved to new positions. In some areas ceiling slabs were removed and repainted by the people who used the cave. Tool marks on the ceiling and pillars clearly illustrate that the modifications served dual purposes, to providing a living space and to facilitate the removal of rock which was discarded down a talus slope. The floor is covered with soil, a mix of ash from fires, fine sand, silt, and locally fragmented rock to a depth of approximately 70 cm (28 in) which lies in seven distinct horizontal stratigraphic layers.

Completely open to the north and south, construction has left the shelter entirely protected from rainfall. The rock shelter features prehistoric paintings of fish, including the barramundi, wallabies, crocodiles, people and spiritual figures. Most of the paintings are located on the shelter's ceiling, but many are found on the walls and pillars of the site.

== Excavation and dating ==
The Gabarnmung rock shelter was re-discovered by Ray Whear and Chris Morgan of the Jawoyn Association while flying by helicopter on 15 June 2006.

The Jawoyn Association found two Jawoyn elders, Wamud Namok and Jimmy Kalarriya, who reported the name of the site as Nawarla Gabarnmang (Jawoyn nawarla "place of", gabarnmang "hole in the rock"), and who reported to have visited the shelter when they were children. They also identified the Jawoyn clan Buyhmi as the traditional owners of the site.

The site was first excavated in May 2010. Led by Bruno David of Monash University, the team included Jean-Michel Geneste from the Centre National de Prehistoire of the French Ministry of Culture, Hugues Plisson from the Centre National de la Recherche Scientifique at the University of Bordeaux, Christopher Clarkson from the University of Queensland, Jean-Jacques Delannoy from the Centre National de la Recherche Scientifique at the University de Savoie, and Fiona Petchey from the University of Waikato.

A fragment of a ground-edge stone axe found by the international archaeological team has been dated at 35,500 years old, which makes it the oldest of its type known in the world.

A slab of painted rock which fell to the floor had ash adhering which was radiocarbon dated at 27631±717 years cal BP which indicates that the ceiling must have been painted before 28,000 years ago. Radiocarbon dating of charcoal excavated from the lowest stratigraphic layer returned a mean age of 35400±410 years cal BP while the six upper layers had been deposited over the last 20,000 years. The art is the oldest firmly dated rock painting in Australia. However, radiocarbon dating of charcoal excavated from the base of the lowest stratigraphic layer of the floor returned a mean age of 45180±910 years cal BP suggesting the oldest date for the earliest human habitation. Faceted and use-striated hematite crayons have been recovered from nearby locations (Malakunanja II and Nauwalabila 1) in strata dated from 45,000 to 60,000 years old which suggests that the Gabarnmung shelter may have been decorated from its inception.

The site also includes panels of recent paintings, radiocarbon dated to between AD 1433–1631 and AD 1658–1952 (calibrated 95% CI), consistent with the reports that the cave was still visited within living memory.

== See also ==
- Art of the Upper Paleolithic
- List of Stone Age art
