= Cuciulat Cave =

Cave and archaeological site in Romania

- Peștera Cuciulat
- location in Romania
- 47°19′3.3″N 23°24′36″E
- Periods: Upper Paleolithic
- Location: near Cuciulat village
- Region: Podișul Someșan plateau, Romania

Site notes
- Excavation dates: 1979
- Archaeologists: Marin Cârciumaru

Cuciulat Cave (Romanian: Peștera Cuciulat) is located on the Podișul Someșan plateau, near the village Cuciulat in the commune Letca, Sălaj County, Romania. It contains the oldest known cave paintings in Central Europe.

The cave has been known to locals long before World War I, after which it was partially destroyed due to limestone quarrying that included the use of explosives. On 28 July 1978, a team of speleologists (A. Done, F. Cucu, T. Vadeanu, M. Codrescu, Simona Manolescu) from the Emil Racoviță Speleologic Club (Romanian: Clubul de Speologie Emil Racoviţă) explored the cave, noticing the existence of cave rock paintings in one of the caverns.

The following spring archeologist Marin Cârciumaru accompanied by two team members launched the scientific research. Inside a moderately sized cavern of approximately 3.7 m × 2.5 m (12.1 ft × 8.2 ft), besides a well preserved image of a horse, an image of a feline, the representation of a bird, of another horse and an image that vaguely resembled a human figure were discovered. A chemical analysis established that the paintings were executed with red clay rich in iron oxides (13% Fe_{2}O_{3}).

Marin Cârciumaru, according to analogies in Europe, estimated that the Cuciulat cave paintings were completed during the Upper Paleolithic, about 12,000 years ago. This dating could not be supported by other evidence of archaeological nature. A significant part of the cave had been already destroyed by quarrying, including possible traces of a human habitation in the cave or in its immediate vicinity. It compromised the chances to discover artifacts that would provide additional clues for the dating of the paintings.

The individual images are silhouettes with neither outlines nor any shading. The painted horse is 24.6 cm (9.7 in) long and 12.5 cm (4.9 in) high, the bird is 21 cm (8.3 in) long and 14 cm (5.5 in) high. The image that resembles a human, in a very poor state of conservation, is 51 cm (20.1 in) high and 26 cm (10.2 in) wide.

In 1985 the entrance of the cave became inaccessible due to a landslide inside the former quarry area. In this context, the present condition of the cave paintings is not known.

The interest for the Cuciulat cave and its cave paintings has been recently revived. A new research and excavation campaign is under discussion on the basis of contemporary techniques and dating methods, that might also allow eventual identification of drawings that were possibly omitted during the 1979 campaign.
