= Paul Aars =

American racecar driver (1934–2002)

- Born: June 4, 1934; Curaçao, Netherlands Antilles
- Died: January 23, 2002 (aged 67); San Mateo, California, U.S.

NASCAR Cup Series career
- 1 race run over 1 year
- Best finish: 67th (1958)
- First race: 1958 Crown America 500 (Riverside)
Wins	Top tens	Poles
0	1	0
- Statistics up to date as of November 14, 2011.

Paul Charles Aars (June 4, 1934 – January 23, 2002) was an American stock car driver. He was born on June 4, 1934, and lived in San Mateo, California.

Aars made one start in the premier division of NASCAR, which was then known as the Grand National Series. On June 1, 1958, he was among the 46 drivers to race in the Crown American 500 at Riverside International Raceway in Riverside, California.

Aars started the 500-mile race in 45th place in a '56 Ford. He finished in tenth place, although he was 32 laps behind the winner of the 190 lap race. The race was won by Eddie Gray who earned $3,225 in winnings. Aars himself only received $200. He finished 67th in points that year. He died from natural causes when he was 67 years old. He was survived by his wife Anita Aars.

== Motorsports career results ==
=== NASCAR ===
(key) (Bold – Pole position awarded by qualifying time. Italics – Pole position earned by points standings or practice time. * – Most laps led.)

==== Grand National Series ====
NASCAR Grand National Series results
Year	Team owner	No.	Make	1	2	3	4	5	6	7	8	9	10	11	12	13	14	15	16	17	18	19	20	21	22	23	24	25	26	27	28	29	30	31	32	33	34	35	36	37	38	39	40	41	42	43	44	45	46	47	48	49	50	51	NGNC	Pts	Ref
1958	Paul Aars	49	Ford	FAY	DAB	CON	FAY	WIL	HBO	FAY	CLB	PIF	ATL	CLT	MAR	ODS	OBS	GPS	GBF	STR	NWS	BGS	TRN	RSD; 10	CLB	NBS	REF	LIN	HCY	AWS	RSP	MCC	SLS	TOR	BUF	MCF	BEL	BRR	CLB	NSV	AWS	BGS	MBS	DAR	CLT	BIR	CSF	GAF	RCH	HBO	SAS	MAR	NWS	ATL	67th	N/A	
