= Earliest findings for hominid art =

Hominin timeline
← / Earlier apes; ← / Gorilla split; ← / Chimpanzee split; ← / Earliest bipedal; ← / Earliest sign of Ardipithecus; ← / Earliest sign of Australopithecus; ← / Earliest stone tools; ← / Earliest sign of Homo; ← / Dispersal beyond Africa; ← / Earliest fire / cooking; ← / Earliest rock art; ← / Earliest clothes; ← / Modern humans
(million years ago)

Earliest findings for Hominid art refers to archaeological findings that might be evidence of an artistic awareness and artistic-like activities from early ancestors of modern Homo sapiens. There is no known evidence to indicate artistic activity in hominids of the Middle Stone Age. Artistic activity is defined as decorative production and production of either images or objects such as statues.

Locating the earliest art work depends upon the suitability of the thing proposed as art with respect to a consensually agreed definition, as to those necessary factors characteristic of something fulfilling the purpose of artistic creation.

== History ==
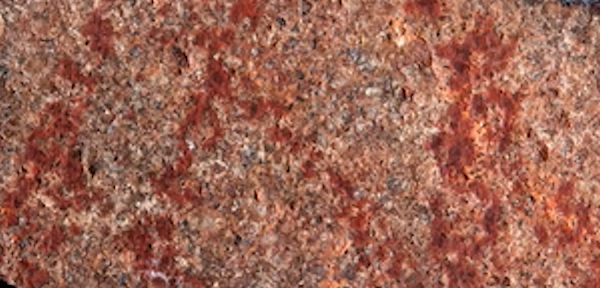
Ochre markings found in Blombos Cave

Above 4,000 meters above sea level high Tibetan Plateau: possibly the oldest rock art, likely dating back to ~169–226,000 years ago, much older than what was previously thought to be the earliest known drawing, made around 73,000 years ago. According to the study, children likely intentionally placed a series of hands and feet in mud. The findings could also be the earliest evidence of Hominins on the high Tibetan Plateau.

Another of the earliest human artistic representations are African rock art made from red ochre around 100,000 years ago in South Africa. The cave where the ochre mix was found, the Blombos Cave, also contained snail shell jewellery and engraved stones dating from 75,000 years ago.

In September 2018, scientists reported the discovery of the earliest known drawing by Homo sapiens, which is estimated to be 73,000 years old, much earlier than the 43,000 years old artifacts understood to be the earliest known modern human drawings found previously.

== See also ==
- Archaeological artefacts
- Art of the Upper Paleolithic
- Cave painting
- Prehistoric art
- Rock art
