= Quina =

Quina may refer to:

- Quina, California, a former settlement
- Quinoa, a grain
- Quina, a character of Final Fantasy IX
- Quinua, Peru, a town
- La Quina, a Mousterian site in France
- Any of several plant species that yield quinine, especially those of the genus Cinchona
- Any of several unrelated plants, including those of the genus Myroxylon
- A heraldric figure of the coat of arms of Portugal
- Quina Mousterian, a variety of the Mousterian industry
- Domingos Quina (born 1999), Bissau-Guinean-Portuguese footballer, son of Samuel
- Samuel Quina (born 1966), Portuguese footballer
