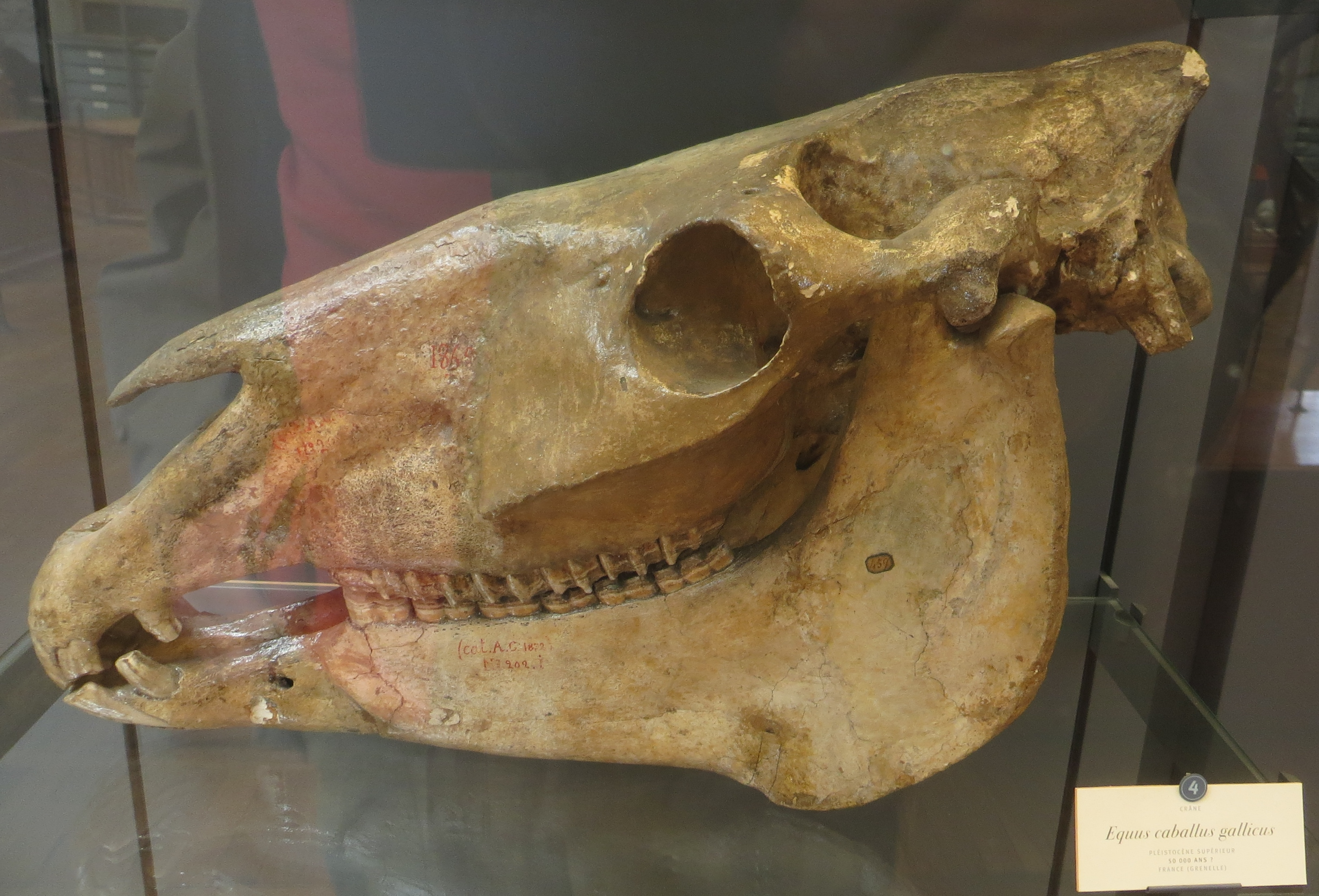
- Skull on display at the Gallery of Paleontology and Comparative Anatomy (National Museum of Natural History, France)

Scientific classification
- Kingdom: Animalia
- Phylum: Chordata
- Class: Mammalia
- Order: Perissodactyla
- Family: Equidae
- Genus: Equus
- Species: E. caballus
- Subspecies: †E. c. gallicus

Trinomial name
- †Equus caballus gallicus Prat, 1968

= Gallic horse =

Prehistoric subspecies of horse

Gallic horse (Equus caballus gallicus) is a prehistoric subspecies of Equus caballus (the horse) that lived in the Upper Paleolithic. It first appeared in the Aurignacian period because of climatic changes and roamed the territory of present-day France during the Gravettian and up to the end of the Solutrean. Its fossils, dated from 40,000 to around 15,000 years BC, are close to those of Equus caballus germanicus (the Germanic horse) and may not correspond to a valid subspecies. First described by François Prat in 1968, it is around 1.40 m (4.6 ft) tall and differs from Equus caballus germanicus mainly in its dentition and slightly smaller size.

== Validity status ==
There is no consensus among specialists as to the validity of the subspecies Equus caballus gallicus. Based on paleontological discoveries at numerous sites in present-day France, such as Solutré, Camiac and La Quina, François Prat postulates that Equus caballus gallicus gradually replaced Equus caballus germanicus and that the two subspecies are distinct. On the other hand, Véra Eisenmann, a CNRS and MNHN researcher, postulates that the specimens attributed to Equus caballus gallicus do not present a sufficiently distinct variation from the subspecies Equus caballus germanicus. However, it is accepted that Equus caballus arcelini, a well-differentiated subspecies, has replaced the populations made up of specimens traditionally attributed to Equus caballus germanicus and Equus caballus gallicus.

== Discovery and taxonomy ==
The discovery of this subspecies followed the examination of horse bones found at Solutré and recovered by Jean Combier. Noting differences in morphology associated with different dating (suggesting different species or subspecies among these fossils), François Prat and Combier postulated the existence of two differentiated types of horse on this site: Equus caballus gallicus and Equus caballus arcelini. The name chosen refers to the territory that Equus caballus gallicus occupied, Gaul. Because it forms most of the fossils found at Solutré, Equus caballus gallicus is generally referred to by the still-common name of "Solutré horse". It is considered a subspecies. As the evolutionary history of Equidae remains controversial, it is sometimes (rarely) considered a species of the genus Equus, named Equus gallicus.

Not all prehistorians and paleontologists recognize the existence of this taxon. Vera Eisenmann postulates that Equus caballus germanicus can show variations in size and dentition, and therefore that Equus caballus gallicus never existed. According to her, Equus caballus arcelini would have succeeded Equus caballus germanicus directly 15,000 years BC, with much more visible morphological changes.

== Description ==
=== Evolutionary history ===
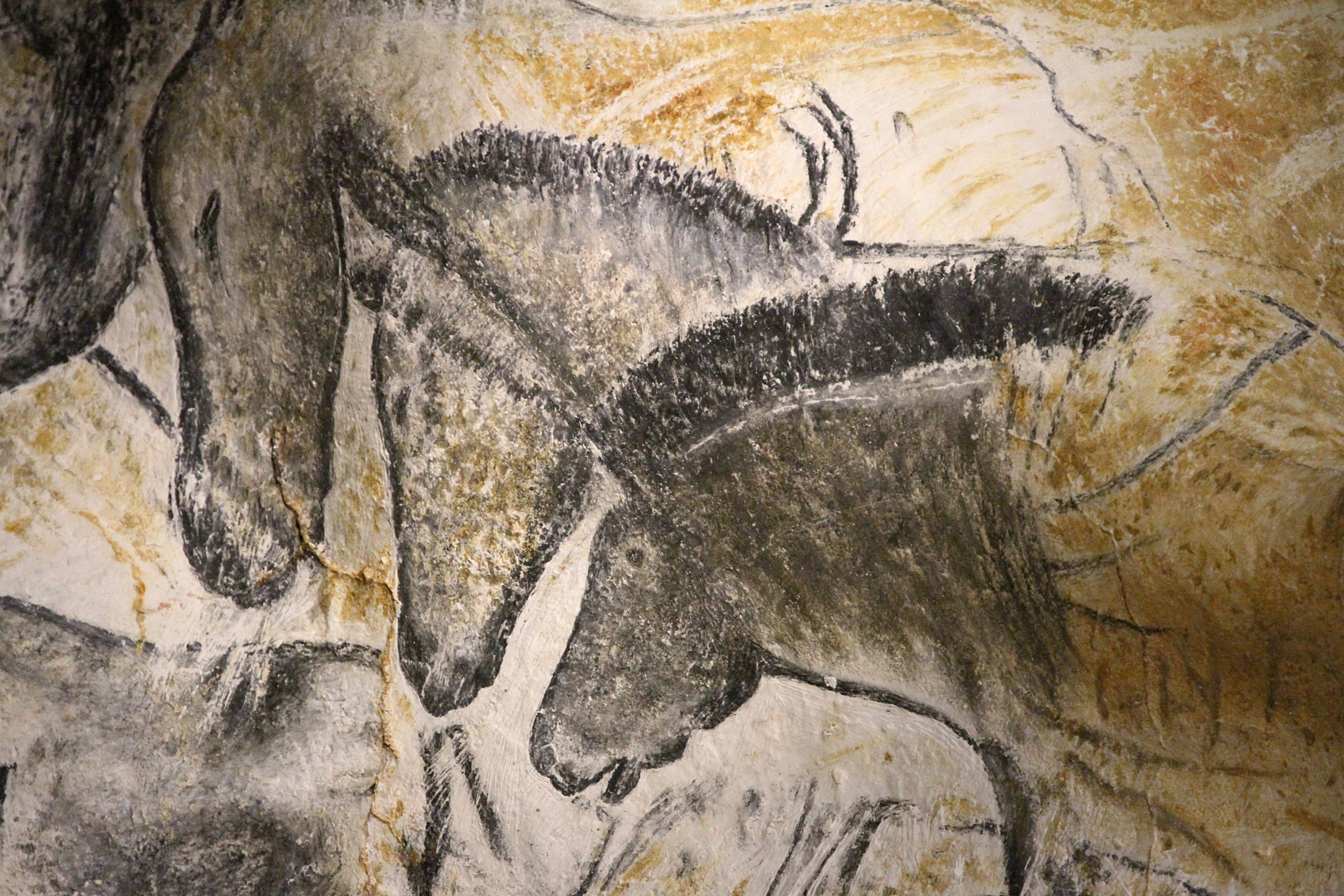
The horses in the Chauvet cave, painted during the Aurignacian period (31,000 BC), may be Equus caballus gallicus.

According to a theory put forward by N. Spassov and N. Iliev in 1997, it would seem that "cut off from the parent population in northern and central Europe by climatic barriers, Equus (caballus) germanicus evolved into gallicus and then arcelini in western Europe", while horses in eastern and southeastern Europe evolved differently. According to Vera Eisenmann, the transition from Equus caballus germanicus to gallicus appears to have been gradual, accompanying changes in the biotope. As horses eat more and more grasses, their dentition changes.

=== Appearance and skeletal characteristics ===
Equus caballus gallicus was first described by François Prat in 1968. Smaller than Equus caballus germanicus (1.40 m or 4.6 ft on average), it has a different morphology, with more pronounced caballins characters on its dentition. It is also lighter than the latter, with broad hooves and a short, voluminous head with strong teeth, resting on a short, broad neck. Based on cave paintings and primitive horses such as the Przewalski, specialists attribute a dun or pangaré coat (light brownish-yellow, black manes and tips, discoloration of the underside).

=== Period ===
Equus caballus gallicus appeared after the first half of Würm III. It is inseparable from the Aurignacian and Gravettian periods. It lasted until the Solutrean and Magdalenian periods. Between 35,000 and 22,000 B.P., the climate in present-day France was cold or temperate. At this time, there were vast areas of grassland, ideal for herding horses. It is then possible that a new species or subspecies better adapted to climatic constraints succeeded Equus caballus gallicus in south-western France at the end of the Würm IV, but this question remains debated.

=== Biotope and ethology ===
Equus caballus gallicus preferred to live in "dry to compound steppe environments" with few hygrophilous plants, in cold, dry climates, where grass was abundant. Gregarious, it congregated in large herds and preferred large, open areas, enabling it to move quickly in search of meadows where it could feed. It tolerated wide temperature ranges, as well as temperate climates.

== Locations ==
Equus caballus gallicus is common in southwestern France, particularly in Aquitaine, Périgord and Quercy. Its remains have been identified at various prehistoric sites, including Camiac (Gironde, 35,000 years BC) and Nespouls (Corrèze, 30,000 years BC). This subspecies generally succeeds Equus caballus germanicus, then is itself replaced by Equus caballus arcelini, associated with the Magdalenian.

=== Rock of solutré ===
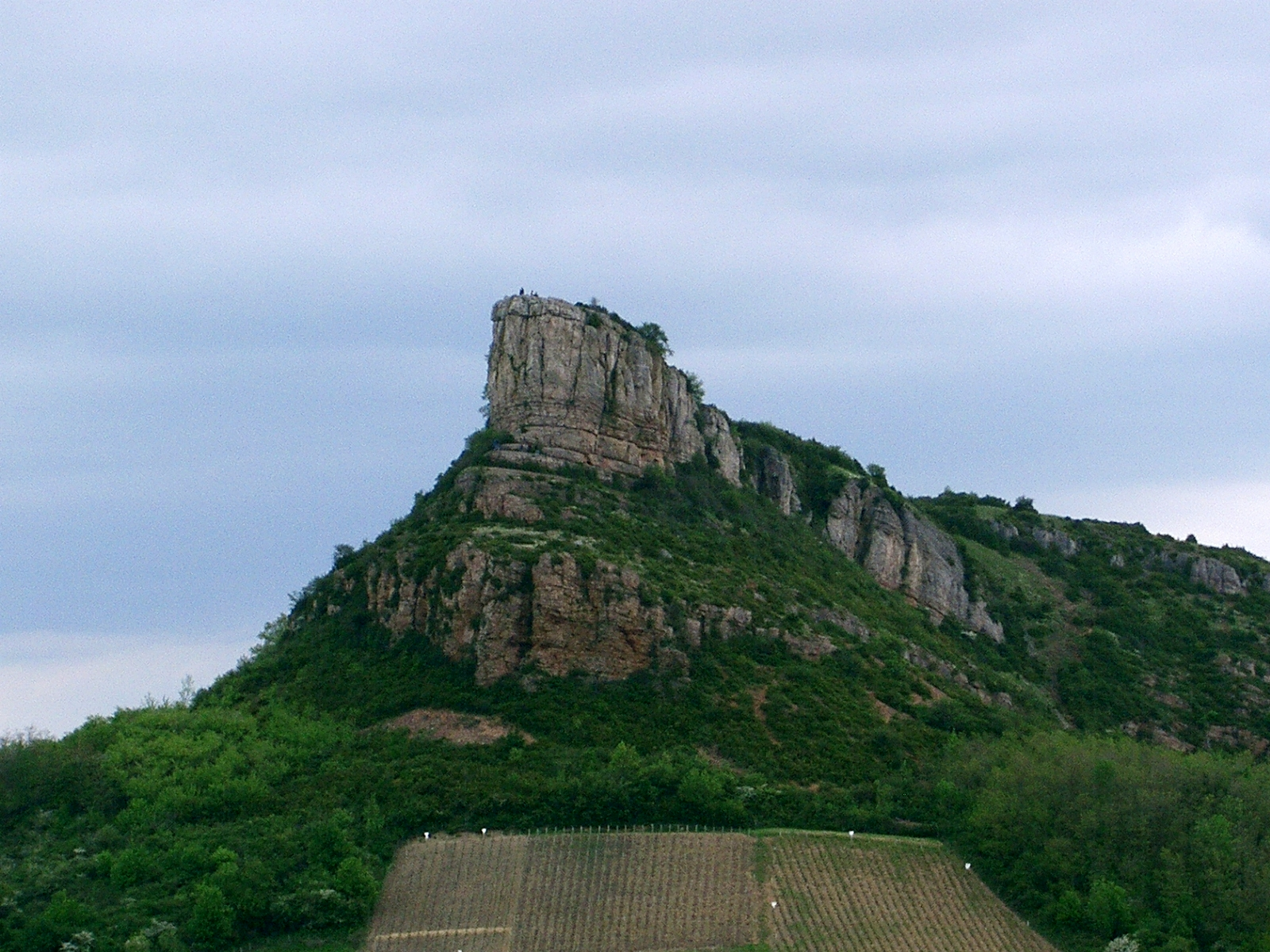
The Rock of Solutré, near which remains of Equus caballus gallicus have been discovered

Solutré is the first site where bones of this subspecies have been identified. Equus caballus gallicus appeared in the region in the second half of Würm III, as a successor to Equus caballus germanicus, which had been present since Würm II. Horses probably often passed close to the Rocher de Solutré during their seasonal migrations, overwintering in the Rhône and Saône valleys before moving west to the plateaus when the weather warmed up. Paleolithic human groups took advantage of the passage of numerous herds to slaughter animals.

=== Ardennes ===
In 1985, Jean-Pierre Penisson summarized the numerous prehistoric horse remains found in the Ardennes region. During the Würm II period, Equus caballus gallicus settled in the Dommery region. According to the Laboratory of Quaternary Geology and Prehistory at the University of Bordeaux 1, this horse could be the origin of today's Ardennais breed. For their part, Belgian researchers note that during the same period, Equus caballus germanicus was gradually supplanted by Equus caballus gallicus, which became a highly prized game animal by the end of the Upper Paleolithic. During the Holocene, horses became rarer in the region. The Ardennais (one of France's oldest horse breeds, and probably Europe's oldest draft horse) has long been considered a direct descendant of the Solutré horse, which lived in the Saône and Meuse basins in the 50th millennium BC and settled on schistose plateaus with a harsh climate at the same time. However, there is no evidence that horses from the Solutré site migrated to the Ardennes.

=== La Quina ===
Also at the La Quina site, Equus caballus gallicus succeeded Equus caballus germanicus. This evolution is probably linked to climatic changes. Radiocarbon dating puts it at around 43,000 years old, or 35,000 years old, the differences perhaps being due to the lack of precision of this method.

=== Tournal cave ===
Located in the commune of Bize-Minervois in the Aude department, this cave also shows a transition between the two subspecies, dated at around 33,000 years BC, and therefore later than La Quina. Most of the bones found belong to Equus caballus gallicus.

== See also ==
- Evolution of the horse

== Bibliography ==
=== Articles ===
- Prat, François (1969). Le Cheval de Solutré (in French). Soc. Anthropologique du Sud-Ouest.
- Mourer-Chauviré, C. (1980). Le gisement pléistocène supérieur de la grotte de Jaurens à Nespouls, Corrèze, France : Les Équidés (in French). Lyon: Nouv. Arch. Muséum Hist. nat.
- Guadelli, J.-L. (1986). Révision de la sous-espèce Equus caballus gallicus : Contribution du Cheval à la connaissance des paléoenvironnements (in French). 11ème Réunion des Sciences de la Terre. p. 85.
- Guadelli, J.-L. (1991). Les Chevaux de Solutré (in French). Paris: Caractérisation et datation des milieux pléistocènes. Cahiers du Quaternaires.
- Eisenmann, Vera (1991). Les chevaux quaternaires européens (mammalia - perrissodactyla). Taille, typologie, biostatigraphie et taxonomie (in French). Geobios.
- Patou-Mathis, M. (1994). Archéozoologie des niveaux moustériens et aurignaciens de la grotte Tournal à Bize (Aude) (in French). Gallia préhistoire.
- Armand, Dominique (1998). Sur la présence d'Equus caballus gallicus dans les niveaux supérieurs de la station Amont de La Quina (Charente). Vol. 9. Quaternaire. pp. 345–353. doi:10.3406/quate.1998.1616.
- Chaïd-Saoudi, Yasmina (2003). Le Genre Equus : nouvelles données (in French). Nouvelles de l'archéologie.
- Sainz de los Terreros, José (2004). ¿Patrones esqueléticos del paleolítico en la Península Iberica : perspectivas teóricas sobre su interpretación? (in Spanish). Tabona. Revista de Prehistoria y de Arqueologia.
- Langlois, Alain (2005). "Le Cheval du gisement Pléistocène moyen de La Micoque (Les Eyzies-de-Tayac, Dordogne) : Equus mosbachensis micoquii nov. ssp". Paléo (in French) (17): 73–110. doi:10.4000/paleo.859.

=== Thesis ===
- Prat, F. (1968). Recherches sur les Équidés pléistocènes en France : Thèse de doctorat d'État ès Sciences Naturelles (in French). Vol. 4. Faculté des Sciences de Bordeaux.
- Guadelli, J.-L. (1987). Contribution à l'étude des zoocénoses préhistoriques en Aquitaine (Würm ancien et interstade würmien) (in French). University of Bordeaux I.

=== Papers ===
- Pozzi, Enrico; Depracter, Danielle; de La Torre, Sandra (2004). Les Magdaléniens: art, civilisations, modes de vie, environnements. L'Homme des origines (in French). Éditions Jérôme Millon. ISBN 9782841371440.
