= Solutré horse =

Paleolithic animal remains

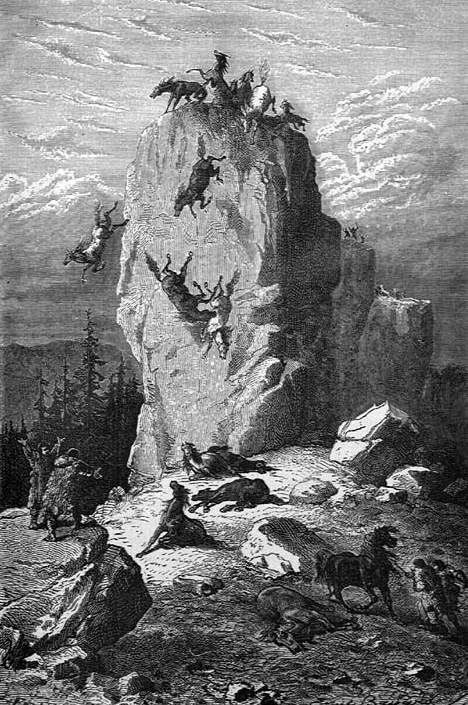
Horse hunting at Solutré, from an illustration in L'Homme primitif by Louis Figuier, 1876

The expression "Solutré horse" (from the French cheval de Solutré) refers to the remains of prehistoric equids discovered near the Rock of Solutré by Adrien Arcelin and Henry Testot-Ferry in 1866, then studied by Professor Toussaint in 1874. This discovery gave rise to a popular legend about hunting in the abyss, according to which Paleolithic hunters guided herds of wild horses up the rock to precipitate them into the void and kill them. In reality, these migrating horses were slaughtered by men at the foot of the rock.

More recent research by Jean Combier, François Prat and Jean-Luc Guadelli attributes the horse remains found at Solutré to subspecies descended from Equus caballus germanicus, namely Equus caballus gallicus and Equus caballus arcelini. From a scientific point of view, the Solutré horse is therefore not considered a distinct species, although it is still cited in popular literature as the ancestor of certain modern horse breeds, notably the Camargue and Ardennais.

== Description of bones ==
The Paleolithic deposits near the Rock of Solutré, in Solutré-Pouilly, yielded a large number of horse remains, discovered by Adrien Arcelin and Henry Testot-Ferry in 1866. These bones were studied in 1874 by Professor Toussaint, in his Traité sur le cheval dans la station préhistorique de Solutré. He estimated the average size of the horses at 1.36 m to 1.38 m, with a maximum of 1.45 m, an estimate confirmed the same year by hippologist André Sanson. Compared to domestic horses, Solutré horses have large heads. However, essential parts of the skeleton, notably a complete skull, are missing for detailed study. According to André Sanson, this made it impossible at the time to determine what type of equid was involved. A new series of studies began when Jean Combier recovered the bones in the 1960s.

== Scientific interpretations ==
Several scientific theories have since been put forward concerning these horse remains, both in terms of how they died and their origin.

=== Domestication or hunting ===
One of the first hypotheses put forward by Professor Toussaint in 1874 was that Solutrean man domesticated these horses, so that they could be lassoed and eaten. André Sanson and Charles-Alexandre Piétrement invalidated this hypothesis, based on their knowledge of Paleolithic man: the latter indicated that the bones came from horses slaughtered by a hunting party, and that the knowledge of Solutrean man was too rudimentary to include horse domestication. Professor Toussaint and the hippologist also disagree on the age of the horses.

According to the most recent theory, horses probably often passed close to the rock of Solutré during their seasonal migrations, overwintering in the Rhône and Saône valleys before moving westwards onto plateaus as the warm weather returned. Paleolithic human groups then took advantage of the passage of numerous herds to slaughter animals.

=== Species or subspecies concerned ===
The postulation of the existence of two differentiated subspecies on the Solutré site follows the examination of bones recovered by Jean Combier. Noting differences in morphology associated with different dates (suggesting several species or subspecies among these fossils), François Prat and Combier postulated the existence of two differentiated types of horse on this site: Equus caballus gallicus and Equus caballus arcelini. It would appear that Equus caballus gallicus appeared in the Solutré region during the second half of the Würm III, as a successor to Equus caballus germanicus, which had been roaming these regions since the Würm II. It is then possible that Equus caballus gallicus was succeeded at the end of Würm IV by a new species better adapted to climatic constraints.

=== Equus caballus gallicus ===
Equus caballus gallicus is a subspecies thought to be smaller than Equus caballus germanicus, and, according to François Prat, has a different morphology, with more pronounced caballine characteristics in its teeth. Smaller and lighter than the latter, it averages 1.40 m in height, has broad hooves and a short, voluminous head with strong teeth, resting on a short, broad neck.

Because it forms the majority of the fossils found at Solutré, it is to Equus caballus gallicus that the name "Solutré horse" refers by default. However, not all prehistorians and paleontologists recognize the existence of this taxon. Vera Eisenmann postulates that Equus caballus germanicus can show variations in size and dentition, and that Equus caballus gallicus never existed, Equus caballus arcelini would have succeeded Equus caballus germanicus directly 15,000 years BC, with much more visible morphological changes.

=== Equus caballus arcelini ===
Studies carried out by François Prat and then Jean-Luc Guadelli around 1989 showed that another, smaller, potential subspecies was present in the Magdalenian levels at Solutré. It was named Equus caballus arcelini in homage to Adrien Arcelin.

== Legend of the hunt for the abyss ==
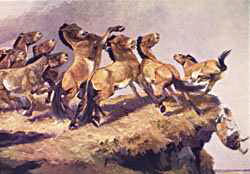
Horses hurled from the Solutré rock, illustration from 1870.

The discovery of the bones at Solutré gave rise to a legend relayed by popular culture, according to which Paleolithic hunters guided herds of horses to the summit of the Roche, then threw them off the cliffs to kill them.

This popular theory, never mentioned in Henry Testot-Ferry's scientific publications, appears in Adrien Arcelin's 1872 prehistoric novel Solutré ou les chasseurs de rennes de la France centrale. It's a piece of fiction that has captured the popular imagination. Illustrated with a wealth of iconography, it has been repeated dozens of times by authors, film-makers and artists, despite its impossibility, proven as early as the 1960s by the lay of the land.

It is now widely disputed, not least because of the distance separating the cliffs of La Roche from the archaeological bone piles, of the order of a hundred meters. Knowledge of Solutrean hunting weapons also invalidates this view. According to François Poplin, this legend would have endured through the symbolic association between horse and elevation to higher ground, with a possible influence from the image of Panurge's sheep. According to the Musée départemental de Préhistoire de Solutré, the horses were actually slaughtered at the foot of the rock.

== Relationship with domestic horse breeds ==
The "Solutré horse" is frequently cited in the genealogy of French horse breeds that are supposed to have it as an ancestor.

In 1874, Professor Toussaint compared the bones discovered with those of the Camargue horse. A year later, he discovered a horse skeleton near Arles, which he described as "Solutrean in shape", and cited it as the earliest direct evidence of an ancestor of the Camargue horse. This theory is still widely supported by a number of recent popularization works published in 2006 and 2008. The official document on the Camargue breed published by the Haras Nationaux states that, following this logic, the Solutré horse lived 20,000 years ago in the Saône basin and would have moved along the Rhône valley to settle in the Camargue 10,000 years ago.

In 1874, André Sanson considered the Solutré horse to be the direct ancestor of the Ardennais horse, assuming in particular that the inhabitants of present-day Belgium obtained their horses from the Bassigny region in the early days of horse domestication, but this theory has been invalidated by more recent research. The Ardennais (and consequently the Auxois and the trait du Nord, which are derived from crosses with the latter) are still frequently cited as descendants of the Solutré horse, but there is no evidence that the horses from the Solutré site migrated to the Ardennes.

== Bibliography ==
=== 19th century publications ===
- Sanson, André (1874). "Le cheval de Solutré". Bulletins de la Société d'Anthropologie de Paris (in French). 9. Clermont-Ferrand: Bulletins de la Société d'anthropologie de Paris, II° Série: 642–651. doi:10.3406/bmsap.1874.3087.
- Piétrement, Charles-Alexandre (1874). "Note sur le cheval de Solutré". Bulletins de la Société d'anthropologie de Paris (in French). 9: 689–698. doi:10.3406/bmsap.1874.3092.

=== 20th century publications ===
- Prat, François (1968). Recherches sur les Équidés pléistocènes en France : Thèse de doctorat d'État ès Sciences Naturelles (in French). Faculté des Sciences de Bordeaux.
- Prat, François (1969). Le Cheval de Solutré, Equus caballus gallicus (in French). Bordeaux: Bulletins et Mémoires de la Société d'anthropologie de Paris. p. 6.
- Guadelli, Jean-Luc (1989). Les chevaux de Solutré (Saône et Loire, France) (in French). Clermont-Ferrand: Cahier du Quaternaire.
- Poplin, F. (1990). Le Grand saut des chevaux de Solutré (in French). L'Homme.
- Langlois, A. (2005). "Le Cheval du gisement Pléistocène moyen de La Micoque (Les Eyzies-de-Tayac, Dordogne) : Equus mosbachensis micoquii nov. ssp". Paléo (in French) (17): 73–110. doi:10.4000/paleo.859.

=== Popular articles and books ===
- Pozzi, Enrico; Depracter, Danielle; de La Torre, Sandra (2004). Les Magdaléniens : art, civilisations, modes de vie, environnements : coll. « L'Homme des origines (in French). Éditions Jérôme Millon. ISBN 978-2-84137-144-0.
- Quertelet, Sylvain (2006). Solutré, une figure emblématique de la chasse aux chevaux (in French). Cheval Attitude.
