= Pierpoljak =

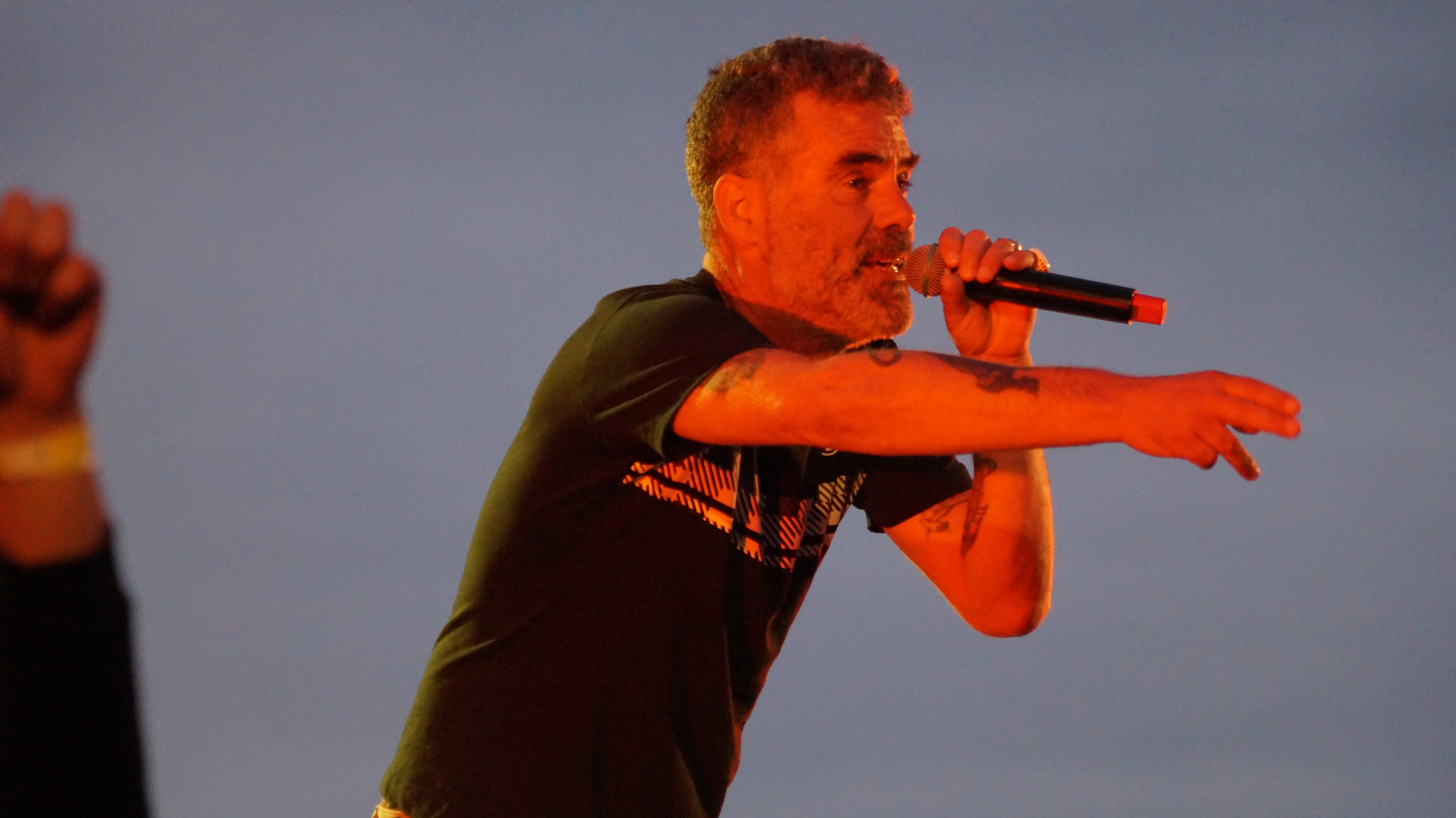
- Pierpoljak performing live at Village Session, in Magnac-Lavalette-Villars, on 16 July 2021.

Background information
- Also known as: Pékha; Général Indigo
- Born: Pierre-Mathieu Vilmet; September 7, 1964 (age 61); Paris, France
- Origin: Paris, France
- Genres: Reggae, reggae-pop
- Occupations: Singer, songwriter
- Years active: 1995–present
- Labels: Barclay Records
- Website: pierpoljak.fr

Pierre-Mathieu Vilmet (French pronunciation: [pjɛʁ matjø vilme]; born September 7, 1964), professionally known as Pierpoljak (pronounced [pjɛʁpɔlʒak]), is a French reggae and pop singer.

== Biography ==
Pierre Vilmet was born in Paris and grew up in the Parisian suburbs, first in Savigny-sur-Orge and then in Colombes. At the end of the 1970s, he played drums with the punk group Samu 92, who nicknamed him "Pierrot le Fou".

In 1978, he went to London to meet his favorite groups, like Sham 69 or Skrewdriver; there, he lived in a squat, where he discovered reggae. In 1995, after several prison stretches, then based in the department of Nièvre, Pierre decided to record his first solo album at home. The Barclay record label noticed him and produced his first album, entitled Pierpoljak.

One year later, in the Barclay premises, Clive Hunt offered him a stay in Jamaica so as to record a remix of the song La Music, released on his first album. Pierre's second album, entitled Jamaican Rides, was released in 1996.

Pierre, nicknamed Pékah at the time, again chose the option of the studios at the beginning of 1997, so as to record his third opus, Kingston Karma. This album was a success and sold more than 350 000 copies.

His fourth solo album, Je fais c'que j'veux, was released in 2000 and was awarded with a double-gold. He won Victoires de la Musique in 2001 thanks to his song Maman.

During his concerts, many incidents were reported due to the singer's and the musicians' violence.

=== The fall ===
In 2001, Pierpoljak fell ill. Following an intensive consumption of different substances such as cannabis, tobacco, ecstasy or cocaine, a first pneumothorax appeared in his left lung. After a stay at the hospital, he went to New Caledonia for a festival. Soon after his arrival, he was arrested by the local police for having assaulted a stewardess during the flight. During his return to France, he contracted a new pneumothorax. In total, he had four stays at the hospital and underwent two operations.

Then, he decided to leave for the Canary Islands and Cape Verde aboard his sailboat, before crossing the Atlantic Ocean to reach Martinique. This trip lasted nearly three years.

=== Comeback ===
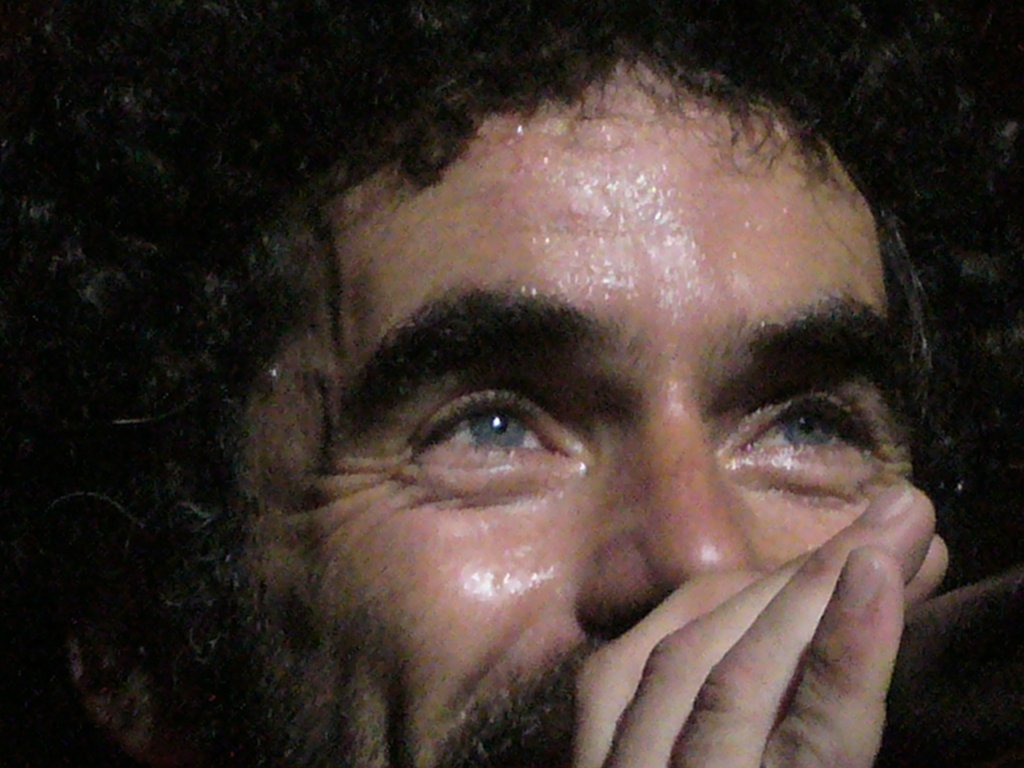
Pierpoljak during a concert in Aulnay-sous-Bois on November 8, 2006.

Back in France, Pierpoljak began to compose his fifth solo album, Stim urban, which was released during the summer of 2003. In March 2006, his sixth solo album, Je blesserai personne, was released; during the composition of this album, Pierpoljak was helped by the Jamaican musician Elephant Man.

The following year, he released (under the pseudonym Pékah) Tuff Gong Blues, an album recorded in 2000, simultaneously with Je fais c'que j'veux. This album was composed by the Jamaican singer Doniki and his musicians. Soon after its release, Tuff Gong Blues was banned due to copyright issues with the lyricist and the musicians of the album, but also because of publication rights issues with the Barclay record label.

Pierpoljak's eighth solo album, Légendaire Sérénade, was released at the beginning of 2010. The following year, in September 2011, a best-of of Pierpoljak's works was released by Universal Music.

Pierpoljak released the album, entitled Général Indigo, on March 2, 2015, followed by Chapeau de Paille in 2017.

== Discography ==
=== Albums ===
- 1 – Pierpoljak (1995)
- 2 – Jamaican Ride (1996)
- 3 – Kingston Karma (1998)
- 4 – Je fais c'que j'veux (2001)
- 5 – Stim turban (2003)
- 6 – Je blesserai personne (2006)
- 7 – Tuff Gong Blues (2007)
- 8 – Légendaire Sérénade (2010)
- 9 – The Best OF Pierpoljak (2011)
- 10 – Général Indigo (2015)
- 11 – Chapeau de Paille (2017)

=== Singles ===
- La music (1996)
- Je sais pas jouer (1997)
- Pierpoljak (1998)
- Dépareillé (2001)
- Maman (2001)
- Un monde fabuleux (2003)
- Allez les filles (2003)
- Scandal bag (2006)
