= Forest horse =

Forest horse may refer to:

- The Black Forest horse, or Schwarzwälder Kaltblut
- New Forest Pony
- The "Forest Horse", a hypothetical ancestral horse prototype proposed in the 20th century; see History of horse domestication theories
