= Scouts of the Imperial Guard =

French cavalry corps (1813–1814)

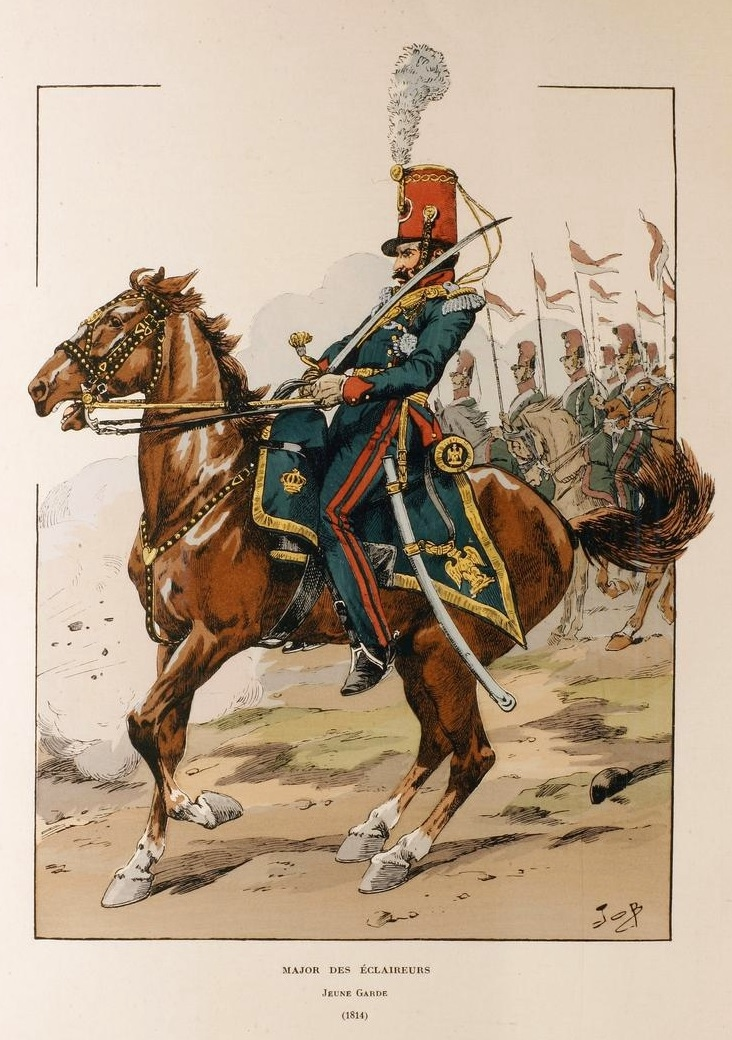
Officer of the éclaireurs de la Garde

The Éclaireurs of the Guard (French: Éclaireurs de la Garde) was a Corps of cavalry scouts of the French Imperial Guard, which included three cavalry regiments created by Napoleon when he reorganised the Imperial Guard following the disaster of the French invasion of Russia. The Corps was created in Article I of the decree of 4 December 1813.

The 1st regiment was divided into the Old Guard and Young Guard squadrons, with the first two wearing a uniform of the hussars, also sometimes known as Hussards Éclaireurs, and the others wearing a coatee similar to the Chasseurs à Cheval.

All three regiments were organised into four squadrons with 250 sabres in two companies each. Due to insufficient recruits, an appeal was made for volunteers from the Cavalry of the Line, and 1,005 troopers eventually were added to the regimental rolls. Although half of the Éclaireurs were armed with 2.75m long lances issued in 1812 to the line regiments, and the rest with carbines, the regiments were rarely employed as lancers in battle, more usually acting as scouts for the Army as a whole. The lances had crimson over white pennons although none were initially intended for issue, and many troopers were lacking these also. The rest of the weapons equipping the Éclaireurs were the standard Chasseur a Cheval model Year XIII cavalry pistols and model Year IX light cavalry sabre. Due to general lack of equipment only the 3rd regiment was able to obtain shabraques, with only officers being so equipped in the 1st and 2nd regiments.

The regiments, owing to their scouting role, were not issued Eagles.

== 1st Regiment of Éclaireurs ==
The 1st Regiment of which was attached to the Mounted Grenadiers of the Imperial Guard, and was thus sometimes called the regiment of Éclaireurs-grenadiers, as counterparts to the Cossacks. They arrived in the theatre of operations late in the Napoleonic Wars, joining the army on 1 January 1814 just in time to participate in the Six Days Campaign (fighting at Brienne, La Rothière, Champaubert, Montmirail, Montereau, Craonne and Arcis-sur-Aube) then to be dissolved on the Bourbon Restoration.

The 1st Regiment's first commander was Claude Testot-Ferry, transferred from his command of the Empress' Dragoons, and most of the regiment's officers were directly recruited from within the Guard including a large number from the Guards of Honour, including Pierre (an old soldier from Testot-Ferry's old regiment of the 10e régiment de chasseurs à cheval), Delavillane, Lepot (from the Horse Grenadiers of the Guard) and Kister. The first of these squadrons had uniforms largely in the Hussar style, based on those of the Gardes d'Honneur (a green dolman and a pelisse with white lace and black fur for officers), and were attached to the Old Guard. The other 3 squadrons were uniformed in the style of Chasseurs de la Ligne (a short dark green habit-veste, also known as a "Kinski") and attached to the Young Guard. The jackets of trumpeters were sky-blue.

The first detachment of the regiment left for the field army in late January 1814, but by mid March the entire regiment was reduced to 200 sabres. The regiment was eventually renamed as the 2nd Regiment of Chasseurs a Cheval of the Guard in 1815.

NOTE: This regt was not formed until 1814, and therefore cannot claim the battle honours before this date

== 2nd Regiment of Éclaireurs ==
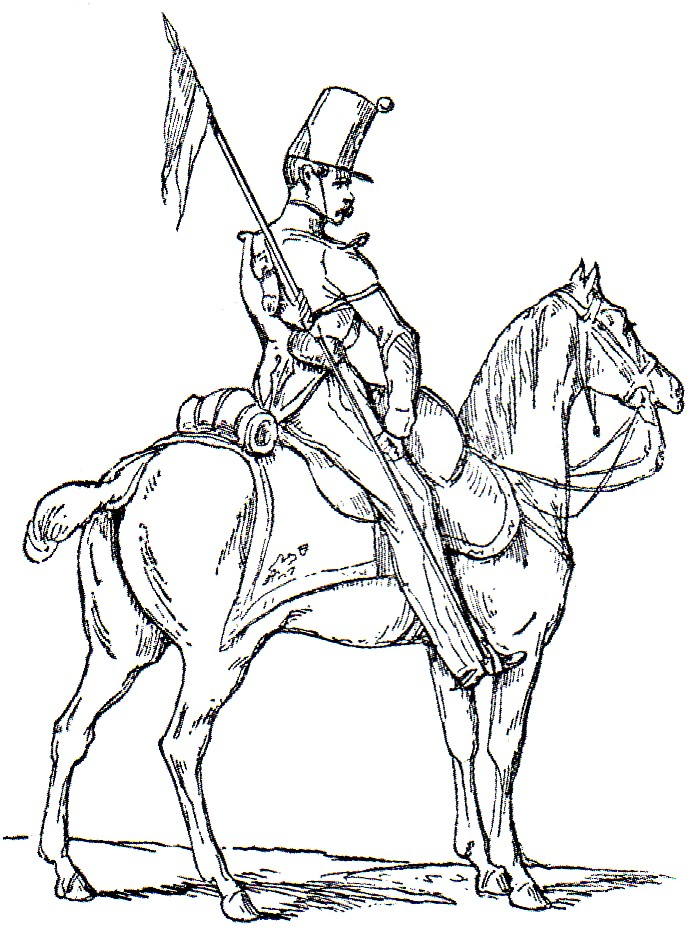
Sketch of an Éclaireur-Dragon

The second regiment was attached to the Dragoons of the Guard, and because of this also referred to as Éclaireurs-Dragons, had scarlet regimental distinctions. For its formation the regiment was allocated officers and NCOs from the 20th Dragons of Line, 3rd and 7th Lancers of the Line while the troopers came from postilions of the Empire, the horse team drivers employed by the Government. The horses were primarily purchased from the Camarguais regional breed, and the remount depot was established there. The regiment participated in the French Campaign of 1814, including Battle of Brienne, Battle of Champaubert, Battle of Montmirail, Battle of Château-Thierry, Battle of Vauchamps, Battle of Montereau, Battle of Rheims, Battle of Craonne, Battle of Arcis-sur-Aube and Battle of Saint-Dizier.

Unlike the first regiment, the second was distinguished by the shako which all the modern works indicate to have been cylindrical, and was decorated by a surmounted rosette of a ganse cord and of a half-spherical pompom. The cord was tied in front of and behind the neck for the officers, the troopers carrying it in the usual way. The shako issued to the regiment is therefore same as that worn by the hussars at the time. The spherical pompom was the colour of the squadron.

== 3rd Regiment of Éclaireurs ==
The third regiment was recruited from Polish cavalry line regiments serving with the French Army, and was attached to the 1st Lancers of the Guard, also a Polish regiment.

In 1814 all three regiments were transferred to the line cavalry, and disbanded following Napoleon's abdication.
