= Claude Testot-Ferry =

French cavalry veteran (1773–1856)

Claude Testot-Ferry Baron of the Empire
- Born: 20 May 1773; Arnay-le-Duc
- Died: 25 August 1856 (aged 83); Châtillon-sur-Seine
- Military career
- Allegiance: French First Republic, First French Empire, Kingdom of France
- Branch: Cavalry
- Service years: 1789–1826
- Rank: Colonel of the Imperial Guard, Maréchal de Camp
- Commands: 1st Regiment of Scouts of the Imperial Guard
- Conflicts: French Revolutionary Wars; Napoleonic Wars; Battle of Hanau; Battle of Craonne
- Awards: Chevalier de Saint-Louis décoré du Lys

Baron Claude Testot-Ferry (French pronunciation: [klod tɛsto fɛʁi]; 20 May 1773 – 25 August 1856) was a French cavalry officer of the armies of the French First Republic, First French Empire and Bourbon Restoration.

== Life ==
=== Origins ===
Claude Testot-Ferry was born in Arnay-le-Duc in 1773. He descended from the Testot family (from Côte-d'Or in Burgundy), which had "provided intellectuals, magistrates, army officers and ecclesiastics from an early date" . To the name Testot was joined that of Ferry in 1698 when Miss Catherine Ferry (the general's great-grandmother), the last representative of a noble family whose origins in Normandy date back to 1220. It was registered at the Parlement of Paris in 1692, and its head was the noble Gilles Ferry, secretary of state to Jean, king of France. The arms of this family are decreed in the "Armorial Général de France". After the death of his great-uncle and godfather, Jean-Claude Testot-Ferry, knight of the order of Saint-Louis and captain in the Grenadiers Royaux, Claude Testot joined the name of Ferry to his own. This addition was confirmed by a royal ordinance of 17 January 1815.

=== Military career ===
In 1789, he signed on as a volunteer in the 10e régiment de chasseur à cheval. In 1791 Mesdames Victoire and Adélaïdes de France, daughters of Louis XV (and thus aunts of Louis XVI), passed Arnay-le-Duc on their way to Italy and the town's inhabitants turned out to protest against their emigration and imprisoned and insulted them in a very confined space for eleven days. Claude Testot-Ferry, then a sous-officier in the 10e Régiment de Chasseurs à Cheval and dressed his uniform, climbed on a wall and greeted them in an ostentatiously respectful and courteous manner. This courageous act was admired by the crowd; the "prisoners" were won over by this young man and offered him an audience to propose he accompany them on their trip.

It was with the 10e régiment de chasseur à cheval that he distinguished himself at the Battle of Valmy in 1792 and participated in the Italian campaign of 1795. In 1797, he became a Sous-lieutenant, under the orders of general Masséna and until 1800 served in the Armée du Rhin.

In 1803, he left for Russia as a young lieutenant with his friend Colonel Auguste François-Marie de Colbert-Chabanais on a diplomatic mission. On Colbert-Chabanais's recommendation, he became a captain and aide de camp of general Marmont, whose career he followed as far as Spain and then again from the Restoration. Testot-Ferry and Marmont became great friends and were buried in the same cemetery, the cimetière Saint-Vorles in Châtillon-sur-Seine. In 1805, Testot-Ferry distinguished himself at the battle of Reifling(Austria), where he captured a whole Austrian battalion (450 soldiers and 19 officers). In 1807, he fought at the battle of Castel Nuovo (Albania).

On 3 March 1808, having strongly impressed Napoleon on their first meeting, Napoleon personally named Claude Testot-Ferry chef d'escadron, and he set out to join the 13e Cuirassiers for the Peninsular War. In that campaign, he recovered general Auguste François-Marie de Colbert-Chabanais's body shortly after his death, and distinguished himself at the siege of Zaragoza.

In 1811 Napoleon summoned him to join the regiment of dragoons in the Imperial Guard, known as the "Empress's Dragoons", at the rank of major. In 1813, he was put in command of the 3rd squadron of the Old Guard at the battle of Leipzig, then the 2nd squadron at the battle of Hanau. At Hanau, he received 22 sabre and lance cuts before safely reaching the rear to have his wounds treated. On this campaign he was promoted to colonel, then Colonel-Major in 1813, and took command of the 1st Regiment of Scouts of the Imperial Guard, with whom he served throughout the campaign in France in 1814. (The dolman worn by him as a colonel-major in the 1er régiment des éclaireurs is now held at the musée de l'Armée in the château de l'Empéri at Salon de Provence, as part of the famous Raoul & Jean Brunon collection).

His deeds at Craonne are accounted his bravest. In effect, the regiment he was commanding was charged with clearing the plateaus of the Russian batteries located on the heights. Unfortunately, the cavalry found itself entirely routed by the Russian infantry but Testot-Ferry, saving the situation, reorganised his troops and led another charge within sight of Marshal Ney and Napoleon. This charge succeeded in clearing away the Russian batteries and Testot-Ferry was made a baron by Napoleon on the field of battle. However, he was taken prisoner two weeks later at the battle of Arcis-sur-Aube but succeeded in escaping and rejoined his regiment at Sens. During the Hundred Days, Colonel Testot-Ferry was made first aide de camp of Marshal Marmont and in March 1815 escorted king Louis XVIII as far as the frontier on his way to exile in Ghent. Following Marmont's tracks, in 1817 he participated in the organisation of the Royal Guard and the king made him Colonel in the Corps Royal d'État-Major.

In 1826, under Charles X, he retired at the rank of Maréchal de Camp (equivalent of Général de Brigade). Aged around 70, he was one of only two officers of the army of the First Empire ever to be photographed, in a daguerréotype, since the end of his life coincided with Daguerre's invention of this format in 1835.

== Analysis ==
Rejecting political intrigues, Général Baron Testot-Ferry distinguished himself on the field of battle - seriously wounded on several occasions and several times remarked upon by Napoleon - and was faithful to his oaths under all regimes in one of the most troubled periods of French history, with one of his mottoes being il vaut mieux mériter sans obtenir, qu'obtenir sans mériter ("it is better to deserve without gain, than gain without deserving").

== Titles and decorations ==
- Chevalier of the Légion d'honneur, 14 March 1806.
- 14 April 1813 from Napoleon I, Officier of the Légion d'honneur, 14 April 1813.
- Ennobled as Baron d'Empire by decree of 16 March 1814, conferred on 7 March 1814 by Napoleon on the field of battle at Craonne (Aisne, Campagne de France).
- Décoration du Lys, May 1814.
- Knight of the Ordre Royal et Militaire de Saint-Louis, le 23 août 1814.
- Commander of the Légion d'honneur, 22 December 1814.
- Confirmation by letters patent dated 27 January 1815 and signed by king Louis XVIII, of the title of hereditary baron

== Heraldry ==
The Testot-Ferry arms

King Louis XVIII granted the general the ancient Ferry coat of arms with the addition of a helmeted head flanked by two primitive stars, and a lion passant holding a sword in the bottom half, to indicate that the arms' holder held his sword high and firm in battle. The heraldic description is :

Of azure, with a fess or, accompanied by a helmeted head in profile, or, flanked by two stars, argent, and in the bottom half a lion passant, or, with claws and teeth, gules, holding in his right paw a sword, argent

The family motto is "In honore et virtute ferri".

The family has been inscribed by the Association d'Entraide de la Noblesse Française (ANF) since 1951, and is still represented today.

== Descendants ==
Général Baron Claude Testot-Ferry had 8 children, 4 from his first marriage and 4 from his second (after his first wife's death). These included Gustave Testot-Ferry (his first name is an anagram of Auguste in tribute to Claude's great friend Auguste François-Marie de Colbert-Chabanais), whose descendants form the elder branch of the family, and Henry Testot-Ferry, whose descendants form the cadet branch. Today, there are 18 people descended from the general, including the present Baron Testot-Ferry, who is Guy, Vè baron.

== Bibliography ==
- Testot-Ferry : "Un des meilleurs colonels de Napoléon", Jean Tulard, Dictionnaire Napoléon.
- Annales de la ville d'Arnay-Le-Duc en Bourgogne, Paul-César LAVIROTTE, 1837
- Histoire de la Garde Impériale, Emile Marco de SAINT-HILAIRE, 1847
- Mémoires du Maréchal Marmont, Duc de Raguse de 1792 à 1841, Auguste Frédéric Louis Viesse de Marmont, 1857
- Napoléon Ier et la Garde Impériale, Eugène FIEFFE & dessins de RAFFET, 1859
- Galerie Bourguignonne, Ch. MUTEAU, 1860
- Les grands cavaliers du Premier Empire, Général THOUMAS, 1890
- La vieille Garde Impériale, Collectif et dessins de JOB, 1901
- Titres, Anoblissements et Pairies de la Restoration 1814-1830, Vicomte A. REVEREND, 1906
- Napoléon Ier et la Garde Impériale, Commandant Henri LACHOUQUE, 1956
- Garde Impériale, les Eclaireurs, Raoul & Jean BRUNON, 1961
- La grande armée de 1812, Carle Vernet, 1966
- Le Maréchal Marmont, Duc de Raguse, Robert CHRISTOPHE, 1968
- Dictionnaire Napoléon, Jean Tulard, 1987
- Napoléon Ier et la Campagne de France, Jean TRANIE et Juan-Carlos CARMIGNIANI, 1989
- Dictionnaire des Colonels de Napoléon, Bernard QUINTIN 1996
- Marmont, Maréchal d'Empire 1774-1852, Lucien FLORIET, 1996
- Napoleon's elite cavalry, Edward RYAN & dessins de ROUSSELOT, 1999
- Napoléon et la Noblesse d'Empire, Jean Tulard, 2003
- Napoléon en 1814, Patrice ROMARY, 2003
- Le Guide Napoléon, Alain CHAPPET, Roger MARTIN, Alain PIGEARD, 2005
- Les aides de camp de Napoléon et des maréchaux, Vincent ROLIN, 2005
- La Garde Impériale, Alain PIGEARD, 2006
- Napoleon's scouts of the Imperial Guard, Ronald PAWLY & dessins de Patrice COURCELLE, 2006

=== Biographies ===
- Biographie du Général Baron Testot-Ferry, Alexandre MIGNARD, 1859
- Le Général Baron Testot-Ferry, figure marquante de la cavalerie napoléonienne, Olivier GLATARD, 2004.
