= Louis Édouard Gourdan de Fromentel =

French physician and paleontologist

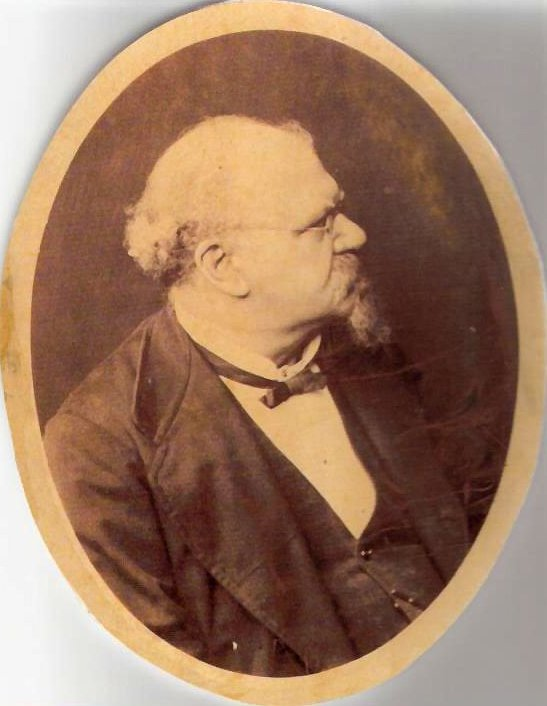
Louis Édouard Gourdan de Fromentel, c.1900, Gray, Natural History Museum.

Louis Édouard Gourdan de Fromentel (29 August 1824, Champlitte – 6 April 1901, Bouhans-et-Feurg) was a French physician and paleontologist known for his study of fossil coral polyps and sponges.

He studied medicine at the University of Strasbourg, then relocated to Paris, where he served as an intern at Val-de-Grâce. In 1849 he obtained his medical doctorate, and during the following year, settled in the town of Gray (Haute-Saône). As a physician he dealt with epidemics such as typhoid and worked as a prison doctor. For a period of time he served as vice-president of the Conseil d'hygiène.

== Published works ==
He made important contributions as editor to the Paléontologie française. a multi-volume series on paleontology that was begun by Alcide d'Orbigny in 1840. Other significant writings by Fromentel include:

- Introduction à l'étude des éponges fossiles, 1860 – Introduction to the study of fossil sponges.
- Monographie des Polypiers Jurassiques supérieurs (É́tages Portlandien et Kimmeridgien), 1864 – Monograph of Upper Jurassic polyps; Portlandian and Kimmeridgian stages.
- Polypiers coralliens des environs de Gray, 1865 – Coral polyps found in the environs of Gray.
- Terrain Jurassiques : Zoophytes, 1866 (with Henry Testot-Ferry) – Jurassic strata: zoophytes; part of series: Paleontologie francaise ou description des animaux invertebrés fossiles de la France.
- Recherches sur la revivification des rotifères, des anguillules et des tardigrades – Research on the revivification of rotifers, eelworms and tardigrades.
- Description géologique et paléontologique de la colline de Lémenc-sur-Chambéry, 1875 (with Louis Pillet) – Geological and paleontological description of the hills of Lémenc-sur-Chambéry.
- Etudes sur les microzoaires, 1876 – Studies on microorganisms.
