= Magnac-lès-Gardes =

- Commune
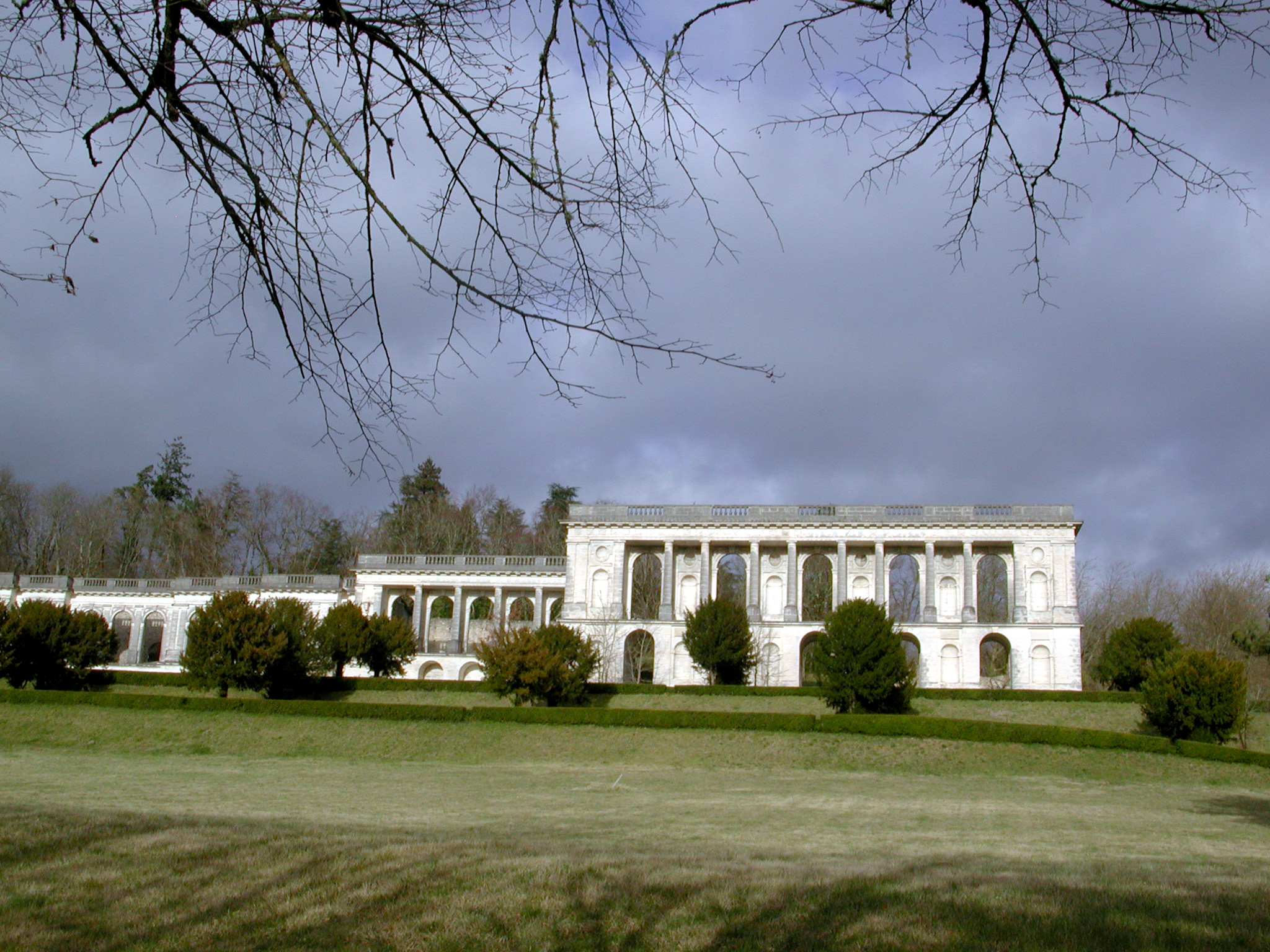
- Chateau of La Mercerie
- Location of Magnac-lès-Gardes
- Location within France Location within Nouvelle-Aquitaine
- Coordinates: 45°30′05″N 0°15′05″E
- Country: France
- Region: Nouvelle-Aquitaine
- Department: Charente
- Arrondissement: Angoulême
- Canton: Tude-et-Lavalette
- Intercommunality: CC Lavalette Tude Dronne

Government
  - Mayor (2025–2026): Didier Jobit
- Area^{1}: 37.05 km^{2} (14.31 sq mi)
- Elevation: 217 m (712 ft)
- Highest elevation: 223 m (732 ft)
- Lowest elevation: 103 m (338 ft)
- Population (2023): 741
  - Density: 20.0/km^{2} (51.8/sq mi)
- Time zone: UTC+01:00 (CET)
  - Summer (DST): UTC+02:00 (CEST)
- INSEE/Postal code: 16198 /16320
- ^{1} French Land Register data, which excludes lakes, ponds, glaciers > 1 km^{2} (0.386 sq mi or 247 acres) and river estuaries.

Magnac-lès-Gardes (French pronunciation: [maɲak lɛ ɡaʁd], lit. 'Magnac near Gardes') is a commune in the Charente department in southwestern France. It was formed on 1 January 2025, with the merger of Magnac-Lavalette-Villars and Gardes-le-Pontaroux.

== See also ==
- Communes of the Charente department
