= Magnac-Lavalette-Villars =

- Part of Magnac-lès-Gardes
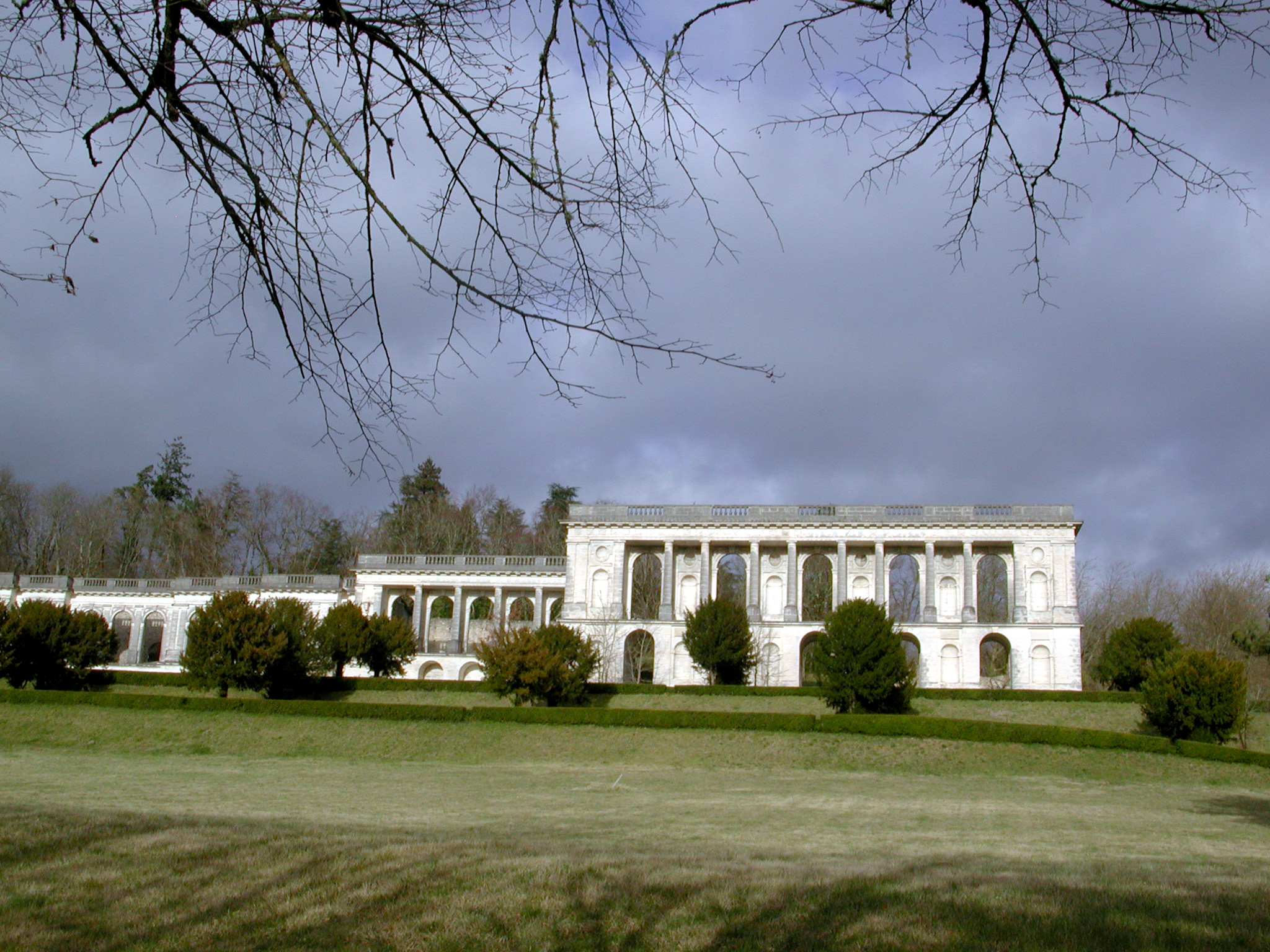
- Chateau of La Mercerie
- Location of Magnac-Lavalette-Villars
- Location within France Location within Nouvelle-Aquitaine
- Coordinates: 45°30′05″N 0°15′05″E
- Country: France
- Region: Nouvelle-Aquitaine
- Department: Charente
- Arrondissement: Angoulême
- Canton: Tude-et-Lavalette
- Commune: Magnac-lès-Gardes
- Area^{1}: 23.75 km^{2} (9.17 sq mi)
- Elevation: 217 m (712 ft)
- Highest elevation: 223 m (732 ft)
- Lowest elevation: 103 m (338 ft)
- Population (2022): 487
  - Density: 20.5/km^{2} (53.1/sq mi)
- Time zone: UTC+01:00 (CET)
  - Summer (DST): UTC+02:00 (CEST)
- Postal code: 16320
- ^{1} French Land Register data, which excludes lakes, ponds, glaciers > 1 km^{2} (0.386 sq mi or 247 acres) and river estuaries.

Magnac-Lavalette-Villars (French pronunciation: [maɲak lavalɛt vilaʁ]; Occitan: Manhac e Vilars) is a former commune in the Charente department in southwestern France. It was merged with Gardes-le-Pontaroux to form Magnac-lès-Gardes on 1 January 2025.

== Population ==
Historical population
Year	Pop.	±% p.a.
1968	345	—
1975	319	−1.11%
1982	317	−0.09%
1990	365	+1.78%
1999	363	−0.06%
2009	434	+1.80%
2014	428	−0.28%
2020	459	+1.17%
Source: INSEE

== See also ==
- Communes of the Charente department
