= Camiac-et-Saint-Denis =

- Commune
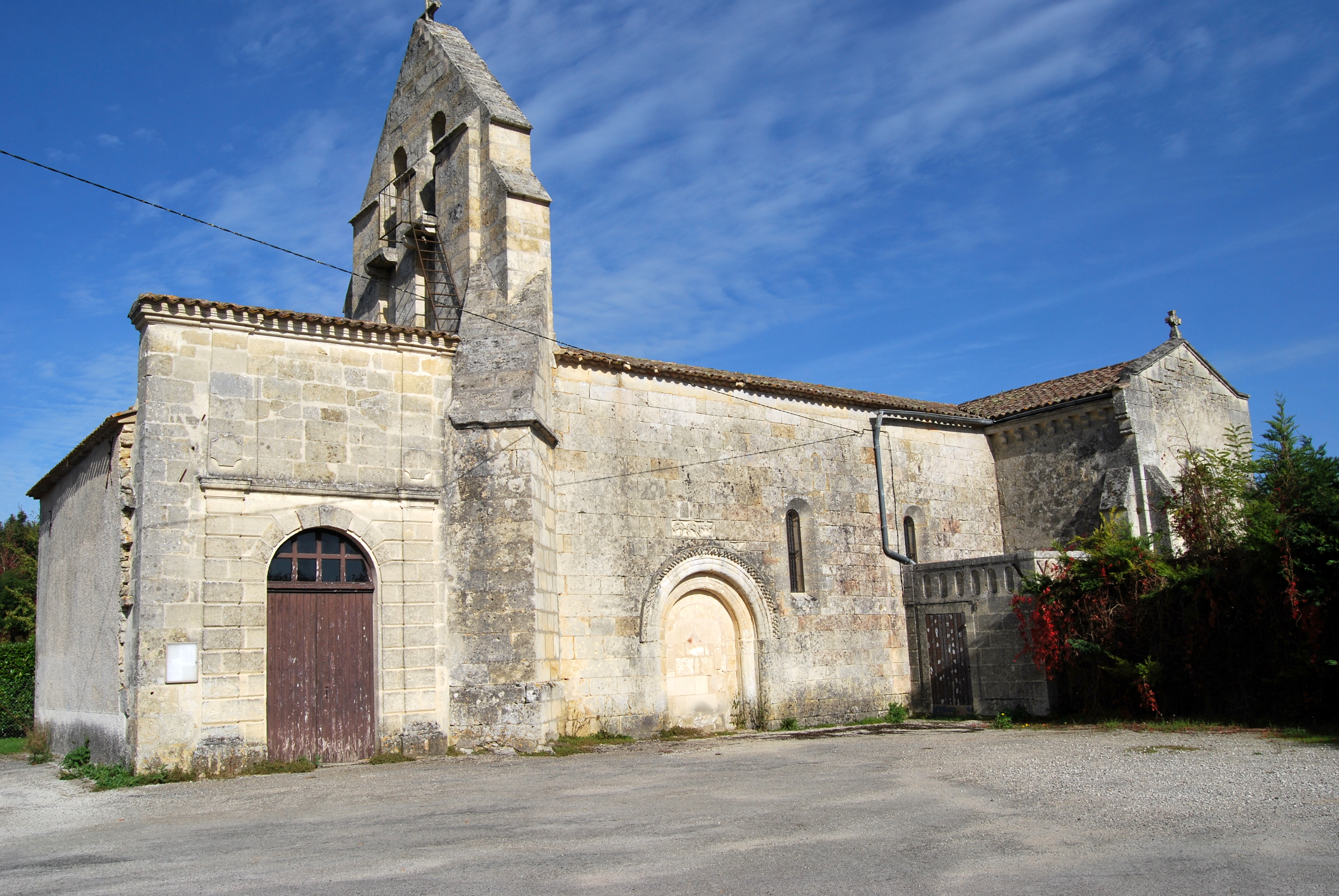
- The church in Camiac

- Coat of arms
- Location of Camiac-et-Saint-Denis
- Location within France Location within Nouvelle-Aquitaine
- Coordinates: 44°47′45″N 0°16′25″W
- Country: France
- Region: Nouvelle-Aquitaine
- Department: Gironde
- Arrondissement: Libourne
- Canton: Les Coteaux de Dordogne

Government
  - Mayor (2020–2026): André Tité
- Area^{1}: 6.6 km^{2} (2.5 sq mi)
- Elevation: 62 m (203 ft)
- Highest elevation: 114 m (374 ft)
- Lowest elevation: 28 m (92 ft)
- Population (2023): 344
  - Density: 52/km^{2} (130/sq mi)
- Time zone: UTC+01:00 (CET)
  - Summer (DST): UTC+02:00 (CEST)
- INSEE/Postal code: 33086 /33420
- ^{1} French Land Register data, which excludes lakes, ponds, glaciers > 1 km^{2} (0.386 sq mi or 247 acres) and river estuaries.

Camiac-et-Saint-Denis (French pronunciation: [kamjˈak e sɛ̃ dənˈi]; Occitan: Camiac) is a commune in the Gironde department in Nouvelle-Aquitaine in southwestern France.

== Population ==
Historical population
Year	Pop.	±% p.a.
1968	212	—
1975	187	−1.78%
1982	220	+2.35%
1990	232	+0.67%
1999	255	+1.06%
2007	354	+4.19%
2012	373	+1.05%
2017	362	−0.60%
2023	344	−0.85%
Source: INSEE

== See also ==
- Communes of the Gironde department
