= Rock of Solutré =

Limestone escarpment by Mâcon, France

Roche de Solutré
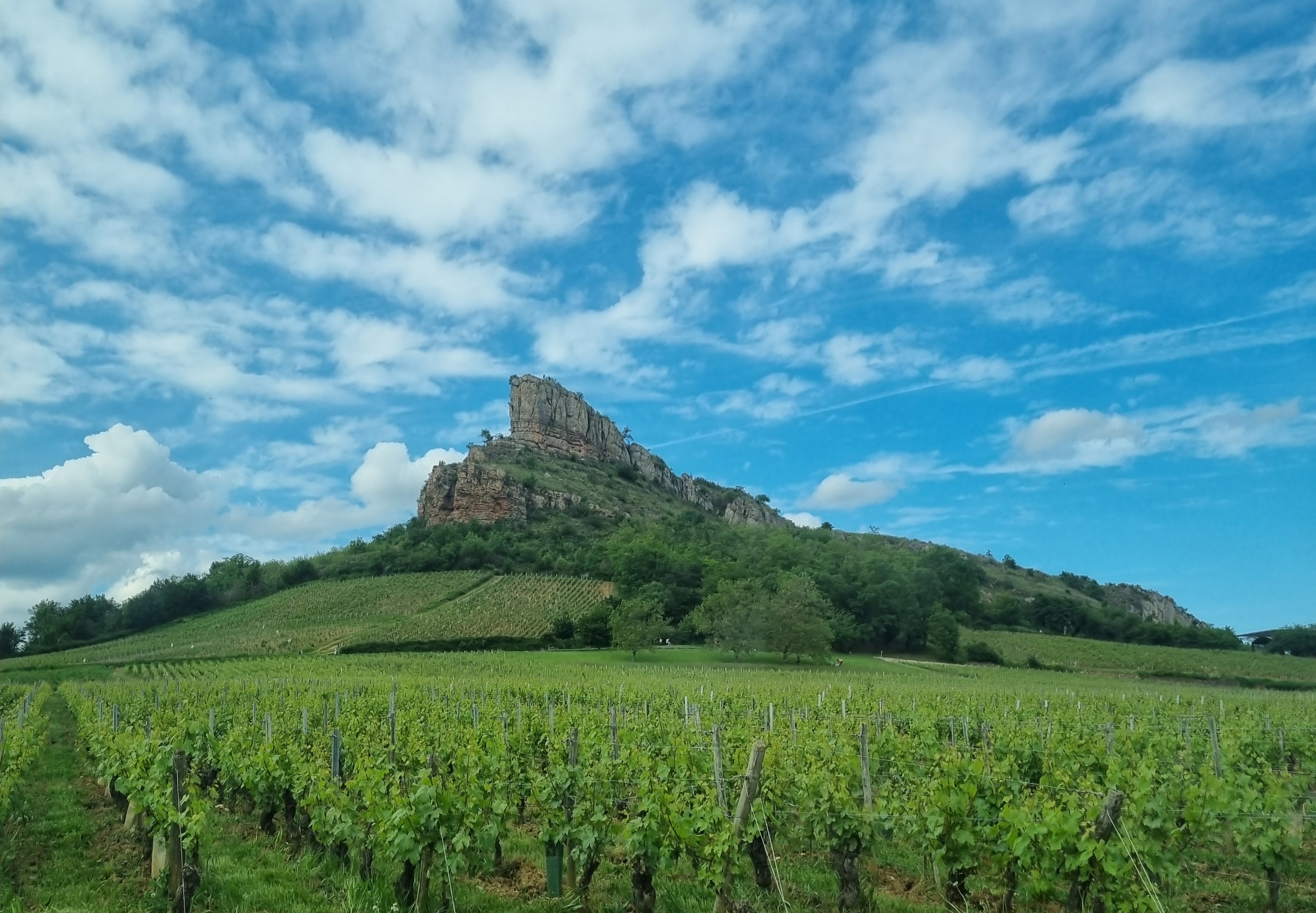
- The Rock of Solutré

Highest point
- Elevation: 493
- Coordinates: 46°17′57″N 4°43′9″E

Geography
- Location within France
- Location: France
- Parent range: Monts du Mâconnais

The Rock of Solutré (French: Roche de Solutré) is a limestone escarpment 8 km (5.0 mi) west of Mâcon, France, overlooking the commune of Solutré-Pouilly. It is an iconic site in the department of Saône-et-Loire, in Bourgogne-Franche-Comté.

Protected by the French law on sites naturels classés and currently at the heart of a grand site national operation, the outcropping is notable in several aspects: as a rare geological phenomenon of the region, as a prehistoric site of the eponymous Solutrean paleolithic culture, and for the natural environment at its summit, the pelouse calciole grassland of Mâcon, with its distinctive flora and fauna. Occupied by humans for at least 55,000 years, it is also located in the heart of the Pouilly-Fuissé wine appellation. It has attracted media coverage since the 1980s, when French President François Mitterrand began his annual ritual ascent of the peak.

== Physical setting ==
=== Geology ===
During the Mesozoic era, warm seas covered the region, as evidenced by the plentiful fossils to be found there. The Rock of Solutré, like its slightly lower neighbor the Rock of Vergisson, was created from fossilized coral plateaus that developed approximately 160 million years ago in these seas.

In the Cenozoic era, eastern Burgundy underwent the effects of the alpine rising; while the Alps grew higher, the Saône basin sank. At the same time, plateaus rose in the west of the plain, then tumbled towards the east.

As these processes brought together landforms of differing natural compositions, erosion acted upon them differently. The surrounding landscape eroded to rounded hills, leaving the cliffs of Soulutré and Vergisson as monadnocks on the west side that contrast with gentle slopes on the east.

=== Countryside ===
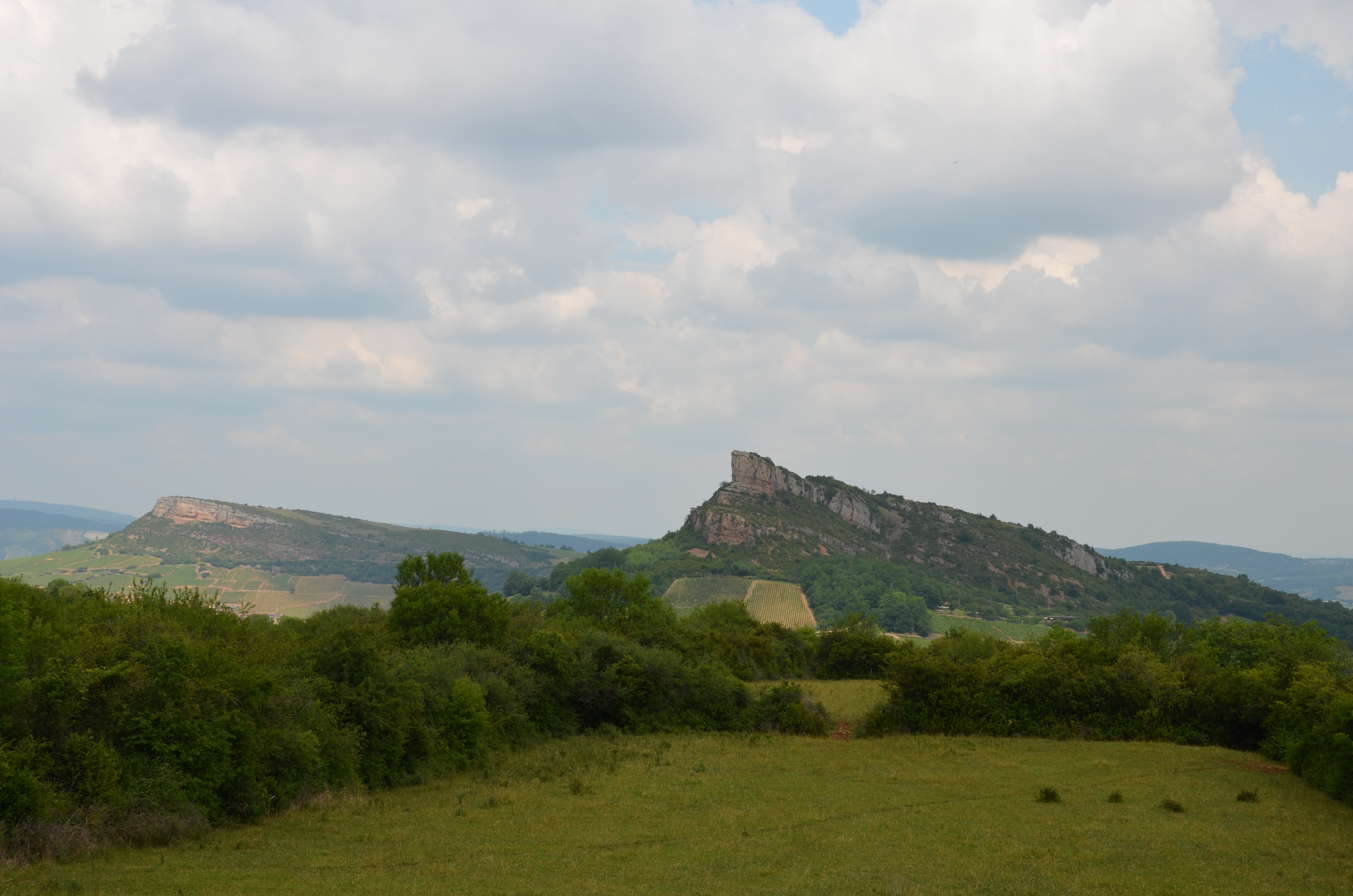
The Rock of Solutré (right) and the Rock of Vergisson (left)

Surrounded by vineyards, the rock hosts a varied terrain, from the height of its rocky peak to its grassy slopes. The Saône plain extends to the east, with a view of Mâconnais in the foreground, then Ain and Dombes against the backdrop of the Alps and Mont Blanc in good visibility.

In the three other directions the countryside is less open and bounded by the lines and crests of surrounding hills, with vineyards, villages, and typical Mâconnais settlements, in particular:

- to the north among the hills and vineyards, the village of Vergisson and its own outcrop;
- to the west, the Roman road, and beyond, a mixed area of vineyards, groves and forests;
- to the south, the village of Solutré-Pouilly and the Mont de Pouilly.

== Prehistory ==
Solutré's remains from prehistoric times are some of the richest in Europe in bones and stone artifacts. Following their discovery, the rock gave its name to a culture of the Upper Paleolithic, the Solutrean.

=== Chronology ===
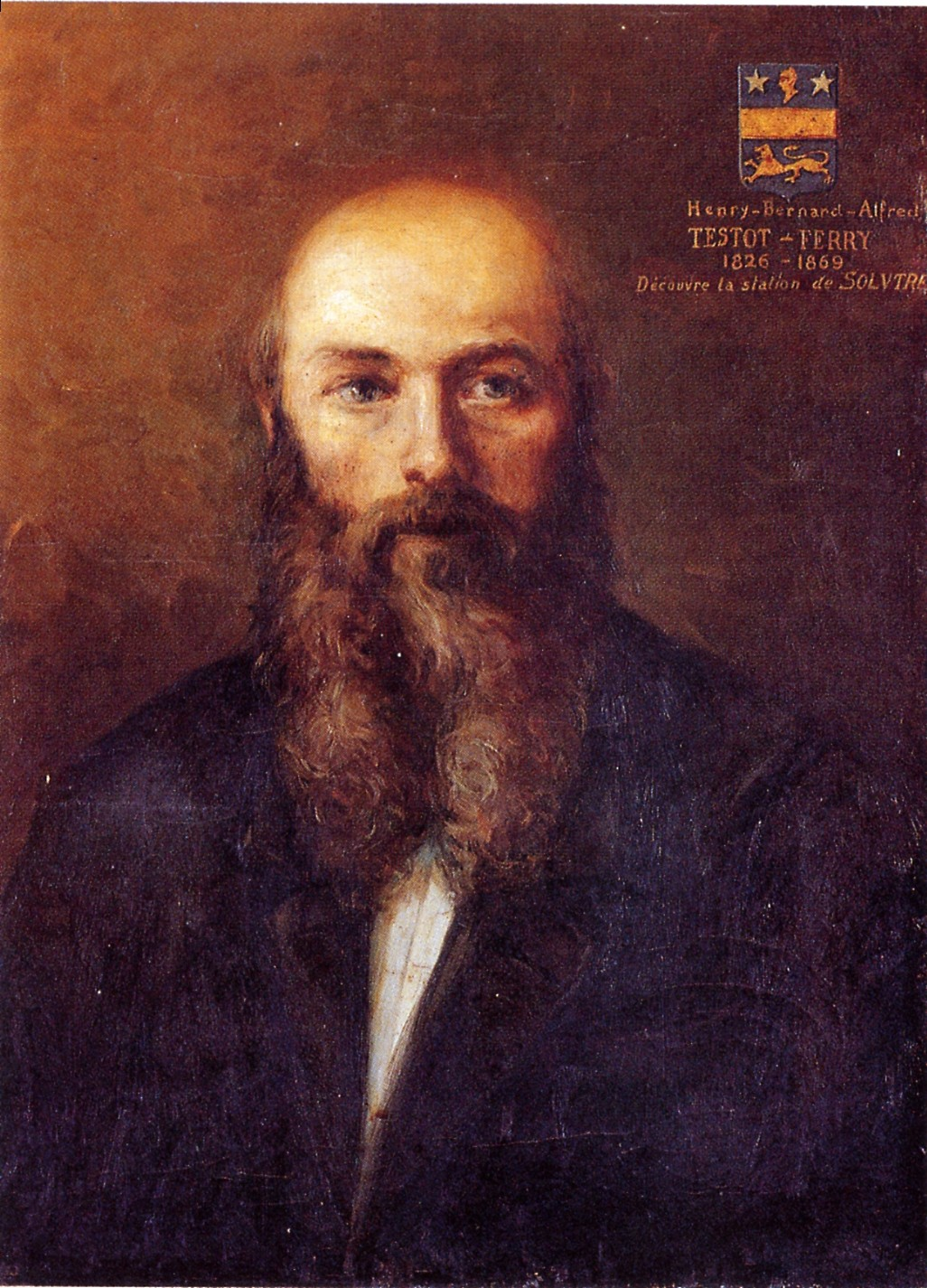
Henry Testot-Ferry

Excavations at the foot of the rock started in 1866, in a place knowns as the "Cros du Charnier", on a protrusion of horse bones, which no one imagined at the time would date to prehistory, as archeology was then just emerging as a scientific field.

The zone of Upper Paleolithic homes was soon discovered by Henry Testot-Ferry, along with some tombs. In the homes, numerous flint tools were found, including spear-points, choppers and other scrapers, and also a large hoard of bones, mainly from reindeer, but also from horses, mammoths, wolves, and cave lions.

Testot-Ferry and Adrien Arcelin decided to see if they could determine scientifically how large the deposit was that they had brought to light, and to examine with great care the remains that they had recovered. The challenge was to understand the arrangement of stratigraphic areas of the site, which would be the basis for establishing a chronology.

In 1868, the preferred scientific hypothesis viewed the site as a hunting station. The two discoverers called on specialists and presented their work at conferences. Solutré was revealed as one of the greatest prehistoric sites in France.

In 1872, Gabriel de Mortillet, one of the most important prehistorians of his time, decided to name prehistoric periods after sites where they were particularly well presented. Thus the term "Solutrean" was born.

Numerous excavations were conducted thereafter. The excavation site remains protected, and still partially unexplored, to this day.

=== Hunting site ===
The height of the sites in relation to the flood plain was the most important factor for human habitation. Providing shelter and food for migrant groups, the foot of the rock, strewn with debris, afforded hunters the opportunity to develop traps.

The bone-laden magma can be explained by the fact that the site was used by four great paleolithic civilizations over the 25,000 years from 35,000 to 10,000 B.C., an extremely long time period.

The use of this site was therefore devoted to hunting activity, butchering and smoking meat, while the neighbouring Rock of Vergisson was a site for habitation. The material found at Solutré was therefore linked with hunting; many tools were found including the flints cut in the shape of bay leaves which are characteristic of Solutrean culture.

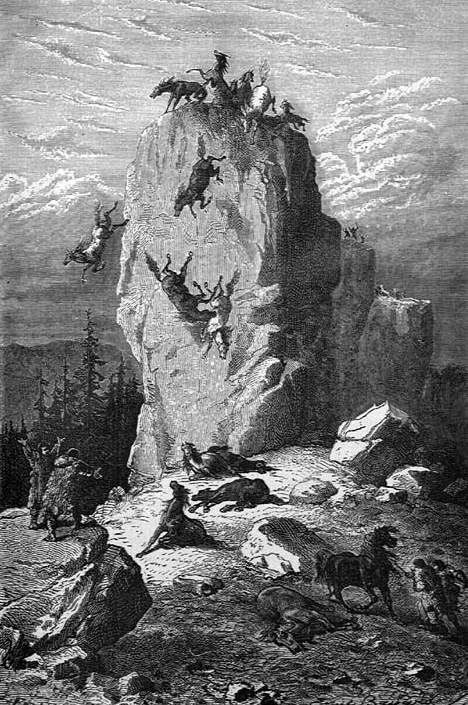
The Solutré horse hunt, from an illustration of "primitive man" by L. Figuier, 1876

Contrary to the legend of the "hunt into the abyss", prehistoric man of the Solutré region never hunted horses by driving them off the rock. This theory, which was never advanced by Testot-Ferry in his scientific publications, in fact appeared in Arcelin's prehistory-based novel "Solutré" (Paris, 1872); it has never been anything more than a fiction which caught the popular imagination. The incongruity of this hypothesis was easily shown from the distance between the bones and the summit of the rock, among other considerations.

Another legend told that the dog was first domesticated in Solutré where wolves cooperated with humans during the "hunt into the abyss". This was also falsified, as the first domestic dog has been found in the Altai Mountains and dated to 33,000 B.C.

=== Human remains ===
Testot-Ferry and Arcelin also brought to light some human remains at Cros du Charnier. In all, by the end of the period of excavations between about 1866 and 1925, almost 70 skeletons had been recovered. Although at the time of the first excavations the corpses were considered as prehistoric (Aurignacians and Neolithics), it has since become almost certain that some of the skeletons are from the historical era. According to different datings, they appear to be Burgundians (from the high Middle Ages) or Merovingians.

Paradoxically, despite the length of time when the site was in use, the Solutrean era was the only period in the Upper Paleolithic from which no human remains have been found. Ultimately, one year after the first excavations carried out at the rock, remains of Cro-Magnon man were discovered at Eyzies by Louis Lartet. The Cro-Magnons were contemporaries of the culture who had cut tools and hunted at Solutré.

=== Museum ===
The departmental history museum, a structure designed by the architect Guy Clapot from Strasbourg, is situated at the foot of the rock. The museum was encouraged by French President François Mitterrand, and was opened in 1987. Because of regulations in force at the site, the museum lies beneath a dome planted with vegetation, and is hardly visible from a distance. The places where important discoveries were made are presented in the museum along with a reconstructions of scenes from the hunt. The museum also hosts temporary exhibitions on subjects related to archeology, prehistory and ethnography.

== From antiquity to the modern day ==
The rock's surroundings have been occupied continuously since pre-history, each epoch leaving its mark although sometimes almost invisible to the naked eye.

=== Antiquity ===
Traces have been discovered of two important Gallo-Roman villas near the rock. One, Solustriacus, gave its name to the village of Solutré. The other would have been situated between the rock and the neighbouring village of Vergisson. A large flattened mound linking the foot of the rock with Vergisson is suggested to be an ancient Roman road, and is referred to as such by locals.

=== Post-antiquity ===
In the Middle Ages, the Rock of Solutré was a powerful high point, reputed to be the domain of bandits. After the truce signed in Mâcon on 4 December 1434 accepting the Burgundian presence in Mâconnais, this castle, the only remaining high place in the region not reduced by the Duke of Burgundy, was handed over to him. Soon after, the Duke, Philip the Good, ordered the total destruction of the fortress by an act passed at Dijon on 22 December 1434. Bodies have since been found of participants in this destruction, killed by the disorderly collapse of the walls. Recent research has shown that the castle had been a noble and wealthy dwelling, but few facts are known about its residents.

An important place for the French Resistance during World War II, the rock was ritually climbed each year by President François Mitterrand and some of his friends.

== A particular habitat: the pelouses calcicoles of Mâconnais ==
Human activities on and around the rock have had a visible impact on its profile. From the deforestation of the original Gaulish forest to the plantation of the first vineyards, to contemporary polyculture and current monoculture of wine production, the countryside has been shaped and changed.

The clearing at the peak and the soft slopes of the rock have contributed to the appearance and maintenance of a local habitat. In fact, until the middle of the 19th century, the wives of farmers herded their goats on these parcels of land surrounded by dry stone walls. This pasturing as well as the practice of burning maintained the dry grass which had developed, hosting numerous rare or protected plant and animal species, who found their most northerly home.

The pelouses calcicoles grassland, also known as pelouses calcaires, are found on four other peaks formed in the same epoch (from north to south: Monsard, Mont de Leynes, the Rock of Vergisson, and finally Mont de Pouilly to the south of Solutré). They are maintained under French protections and sustainable development rules. When pasturing ceased after the Second World War, the area was colonized by boxtree, juniper and pedunculate oak.

Flora include inula, hippocrepis emerus, Bombycilaena erecta, wild orchid, hippocrepis comosa. Mountain and Mediterranean species which share the rock include festuca, carex, bromus, helianthemum, silene, rubia peregrina, Œillet (which can refer to several species), sesleria caerulea, sedum and saxifrage.

Notable birds of the rock include the ortolan bunting, the scops-owl, the European nightjar, the short-toed snake eagle, the northern harrier and the woodlark. Notable insects include the scarce swallowtail, the praying mantis and the Mediterranean cricket.

== Viticulture ==
Cluniac monks practised viticulture in the area surrounding the Rock. The area's tradition of producing chardonnay has given rise to wines of international reputation:

- Mâcon-Solutré (Mâcon-Villages)
- Saint-Véran
- Pouilly-Fuissé

== Protection and sustainable development ==
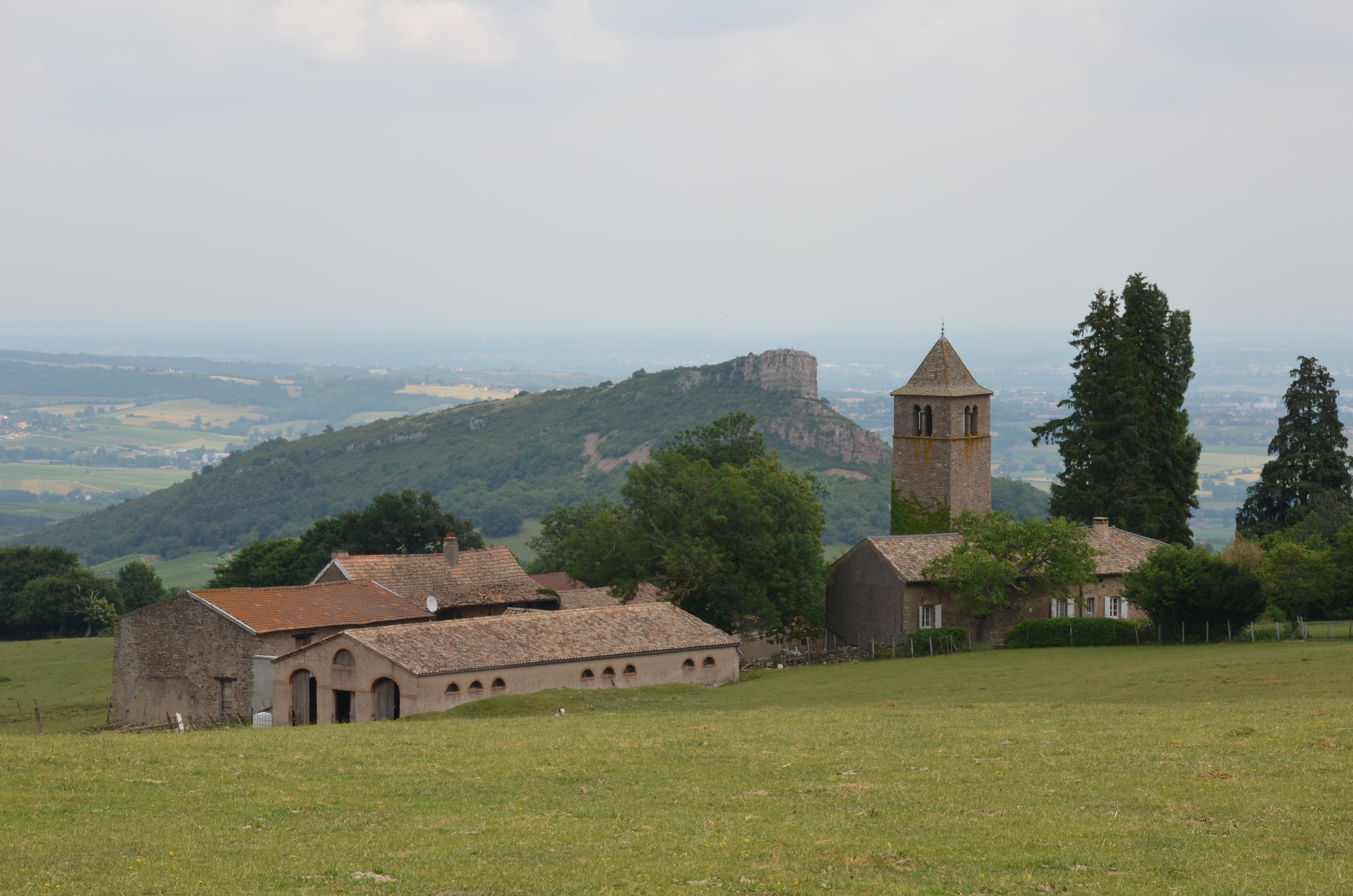
View of the Rock of Solutré from La Grange du Bois hamlet

The Rock had been partially protected by the law of 2 May 1930 on the protection of natural monuments and sites of artistic, historic, legendary or picturesque character, by virtue of its spectacular aspect and the archeological sites which it sheltered, and was part of the Natura 2000 network in the context of its pelouses calcioles grassland. These protections have turned out to be insufficient in the face of heavy visitation by locals and tourists, and the usure created on the site, and maintenance costs which are too heavy for the local communes.

From the 1990s the Rock has been officially made the focus of an Operation Grand Site. This law does not add any regulatory constraints but constitutes a tool for restoring and bringing value to the site, setting up a reception, and generating a dynamic local economy and a continuing management of the area.

Since 1995 trials have taken place to maintain the site as is involving e.g. grazing by Konik Polski horses and fighting colonization by boxtree through pasturing. The pathways have been revised to enhance safety for visitors and to stop the degradation of tracks, the parking lot has made way for a new one, which integrates almost completely with the landscape.

== Anecdotes ==
The 2009 Michelin guide for Bourgogne, in its article on the Rock of Solutré, mistakenly displayed a photograph of the Rock of Vergisson.

=== Well-known quotations concerning the rock ===
- Sphinx aux griffes plantées dans les ceps (A Sphinx with claws planted in the vines)
- Deux navires pétrifiés surplombant une mer de vignes (Two petrified ships overlooking a sea of vineyards) Alphonse de Lamartine, speaking of the two rocks of Solutré Vergisson
- De là, j'observe ce qui va, ce qui vient, ce qui bouge et surtout ce qui ne bouge pas. (From there, I watch what comes and goes, what moves, and above all that which does not move.) François Mitterrand in La Paille et le Grain, 1978.

== See also ==
- (in French) France's Grands Sites network
- (in French) Definition of an Opération Grand site (OGS) on the French Ministry of Ecology and Sustainable Development Website
- Head-Smashed-In Buffalo Jump
- Solutré horse

== Bibliography ==
- (in French) Paléontologie française, Henry de Ferry & Dr. de Fromentel, Paris, 1861
- (in French) L'Homme préhistorique en Mâconnais, Henry de Ferry, 1868
- (in French) Le Mâconnais préhistorique, Henry de Ferry, Paris, 1870
- (in French) Solutré ou les chasseurs de rennes de la France centrale, Adrien Arcelin, Paris, 1872
- (in French) Les fouilles de Solutré, Adrien Arcelin, Mâcon, 1873
- (in French) Annales de l'Académie de Mâcon, 1869–1906
- (in French) 1866 : l'invention de Solutré, 1989 Summer exhibition catalogue of the Musée Départemental de Préhistoire de Solutré
- (in French) Solutré, 1968–1998, Jean Combier et Anta Montet-White (dir.), (2002), Mémoire de la Société Préhistorique française XXX, ISBN 2-913745-15-6
