= Gardes-le-Pontaroux =

- Part of Magnac-lès-Gardes
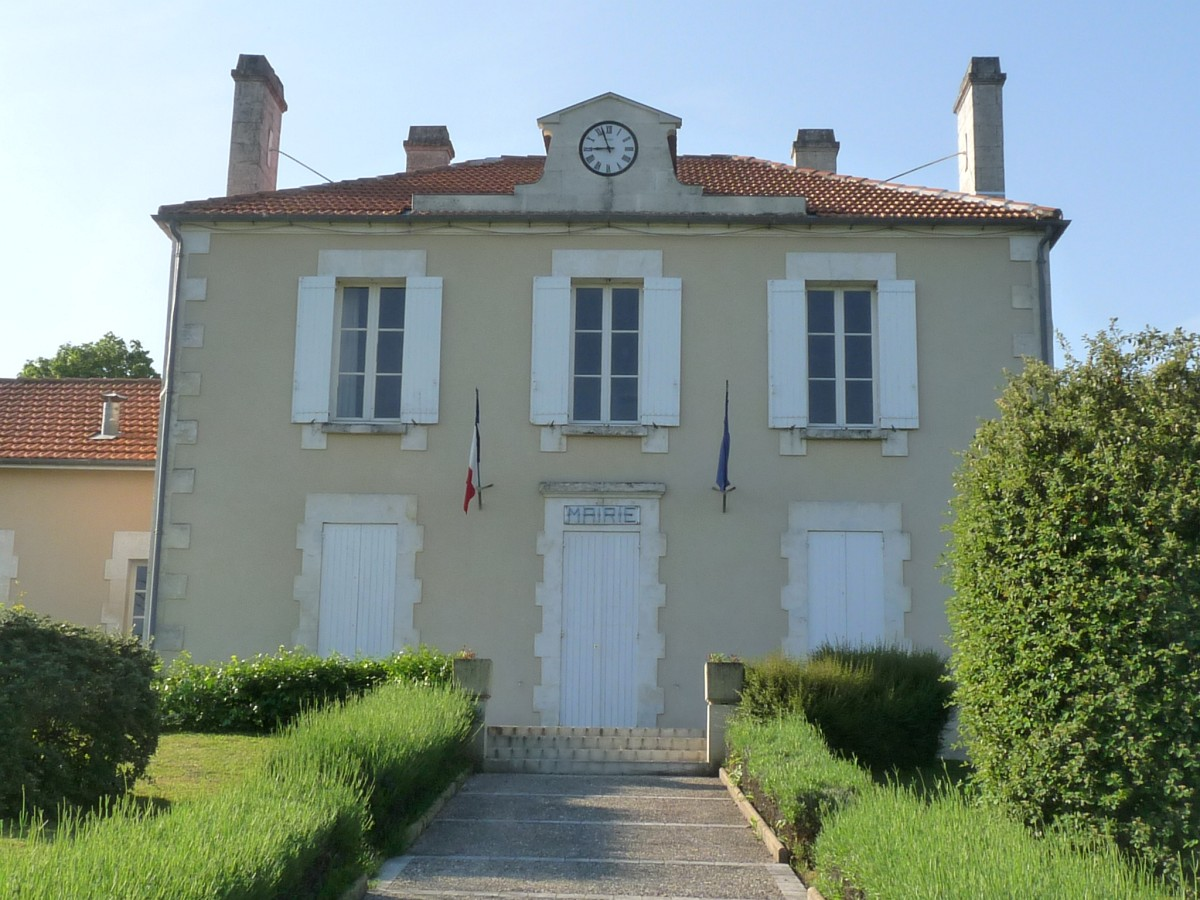
- The town hall in Gardes-le-Pontaroux
- Location of Gardes-le-Pontaroux
- Location within France Location within Nouvelle-Aquitaine
- Coordinates: 45°31′13″N 0°18′20″E
- Country: France
- Region: Nouvelle-Aquitaine
- Department: Charente
- Arrondissement: Angoulême
- Canton: Tude-et-Lavalette
- Commune: Magnac-lès-Gardes
- Area^{1}: 13.3 km^{2} (5.1 sq mi)
- Elevation: 155 m (509 ft)
- Highest elevation: 220 m (720 ft)
- Lowest elevation: 101 m (331 ft)
- Population (2022): 256
  - Density: 19.2/km^{2} (49.9/sq mi)
- Time zone: UTC+01:00 (CET)
  - Summer (DST): UTC+02:00 (CEST)
- Postal code: 16320
- ^{1} French Land Register data, which excludes lakes, ponds, glaciers > 1 km^{2} (0.386 sq mi or 247 acres) and river estuaries.

Gardes-le-Pontaroux (French pronunciation: [ɡaʁd lə pɔ̃taʁu]; Occitan: Garda) is a former commune in the Charente department in southwestern France. It was merged with Magnac-Lavalette-Villars to form Magnac-lès-Gardes on 1 January 2025.

== Population ==
Historical population
Year	Pop.	±% p.a.
1968	237	—
1975	217	−1.25%
1982	267	+3.01%
1990	242	−1.22%
1999	248	+0.27%
2009	267	+0.74%
2014	262	−0.38%
2020	259	−0.19%
Source: INSEE

== See also ==
- Communes of the Charente department
