= Henry Testot-Ferry =

French geologist, archeologist and paleontologist

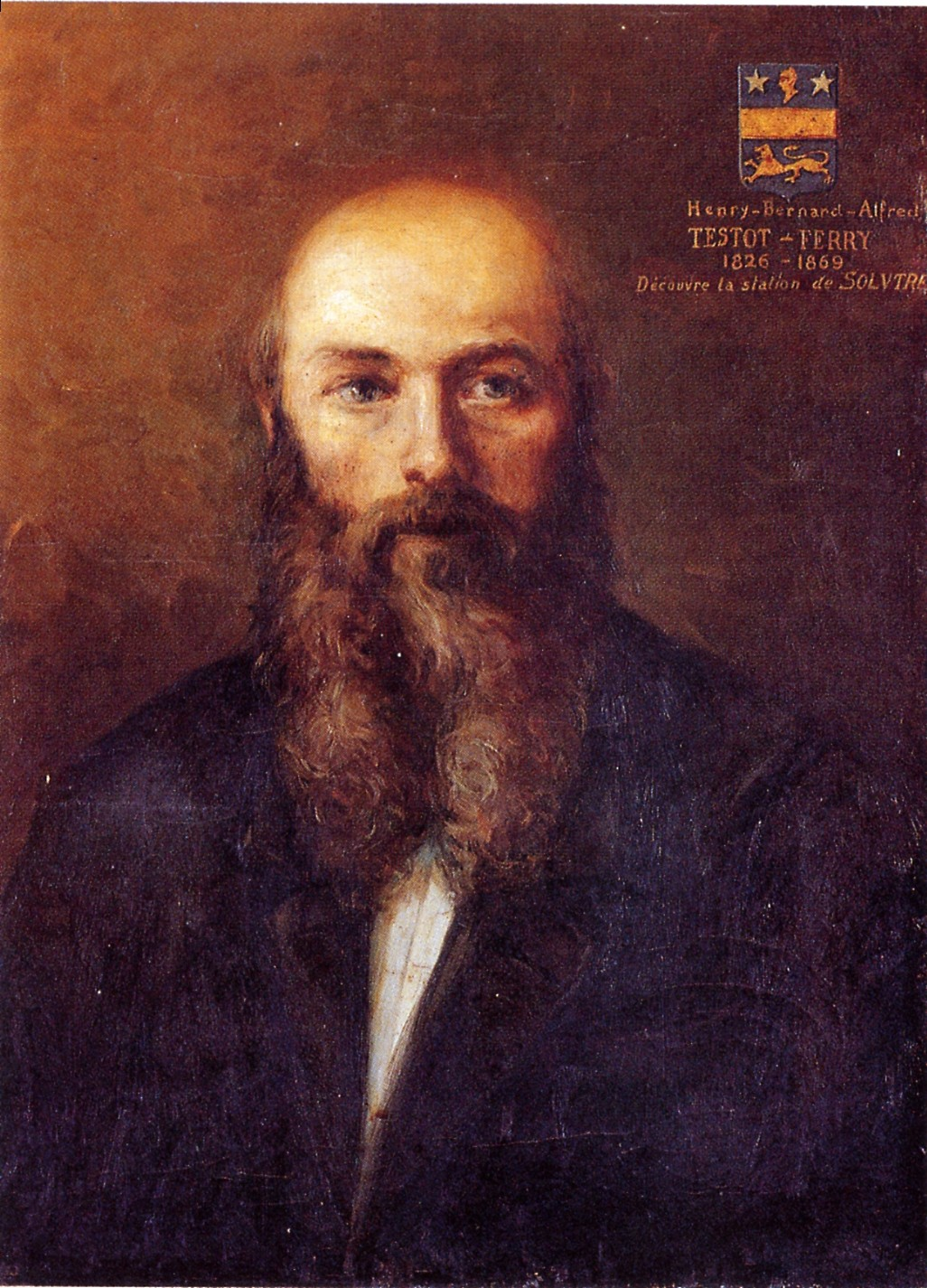
Henry Testot-Ferry

Henry Bernard Alfred Testot-Ferry also known as Henry de Ferry (5 February 1826, La Chapelle-la-Reine, Seine-et-Marne – 9 November 1869, Bussières, Saône-et-Loire) was a French geologist, archeologist and paleontologist. He was discoverer of the prehistoric site at the Rock of Solutré.

== Family ==
Testot-Ferry was the youngest son of Baron Claude Testot-Ferry and his wife Joséphine Elizabeth Claudine Fabry. Henry's father was a hero of the Napoleonic Wars who had been ennobled by Emperor Napoleon and died at Châtillon-sur-Seine.

After a somewhat idle youth typical of the "gilded youth" of the 19th century, in which hunting was his chief passion, he married in 1852, at the advice (or perhaps the insistence) of his older brother Gustave. His wife was Louise Madeleine O'Brien, descendant of the O'Brien clan of Munster, which had given rise to several Kings of Ireland, and which had been received to courtly honours under Louis XV in 1737. O'Brien brought as dowry her property at Prissé, Saône-et-Loire which they occupied until moving to settle down in the village of Bussières, situated a few kilometres from the Rock of Solutré. Testot-Ferry became mayor of Bussières in 1856.

Testot-Ferry would have six children, whose lives would have nothing to do with paleontology. His son Alfred, born in 1853, became a ship lieutenant at Toulon, and was elevated to Chevalier de la légion d'honneur.

== Early career ==
Testot-Ferry initially devoted himself to geology. A founding member of the Comité de paléontologie française, he was put in charge of monograph on fossilized cnidaria polyps in collaboration with Dr. Louis Édouard Gourdan de Fromentel. During this time he discovered and described a new genre which took his name: "Ferrya".

Testot-Ferry was the first to note traces of different prehistoric occupations in Saône river valley, which he found while searching the region in its entirety and particularly the Charbonnières-les-Sapins site.

== The Rock of Solutré ==
With paleontology overtaking geology as his main interest, Testot-Ferry started to probe the Crot-du-Charnier site at the foot of the Rock of Solutré in 1866, which had outcrops of horse bones (called "magma"). Shortly afterwards, Testot-Ferry discovered, along the road crossing Crot-du-Charnier, a zone of homes from the "Reindeer Age" (the Upper Paleolithic era of prehistory) containing numerous flint tools and the remains of fauna. Although reindeer predominated, horse, elephant, red deer, fox, wolf and even cave tiger were also found. In some homes he found more than 2,000 flints and almost 400 reindeer antlers.

In contrast to cave sites which had been discovered, in Solutré it was difficult to determine the size of the deposits and their boundary. Testot-Ferry proceeded to survey the area along with Adrien Arcelin. The two men decided to sift the earth with their hands, so that the remains would be methodically collected and examined.

In 1868, Testot-Ferry concluded that a hunting station had existed at the foot of the rock:

If only from the prevalence of weapons, scrapers and blades, it is easy to see that what one has here is a culture of exclusive hunting, which needed weapons most of all in order to master their prey, then blades to dismember it, cutting away bone and antlers, then scrapers to expose the gut, scrape the bones and particularly to prepare the hides, a step which must have been one of the main activities of the tribe when they returned to their homes, judging by the number of this last type of tool.

— Henry Testot-Ferry, 1869

In 1867 Testot-Ferry had also discovered a small statuette of a deer. This was first known specimen of Solutrean art, and attested to the culture of prehistoric man in the same way as cave paintings.

== A life devoted to the sciences ==
In the course of his studies on the prehistoric deposits at the Rock of Solutré, Testot-Ferry came into contact with most of the prehistorians of his day to discuss and check a certain number of hypotheses. He also maintained a long correspondence with Jacques Boucher de Perthes. Édouard Lartet, Gabriel de Mortillet and Sir John Lubbock would even come to the site to help him with excavations. Testot-Ferry and Arcelin presented their research in international conferences, and Solutré very quickly became one of the most important prehistoric sites in France.

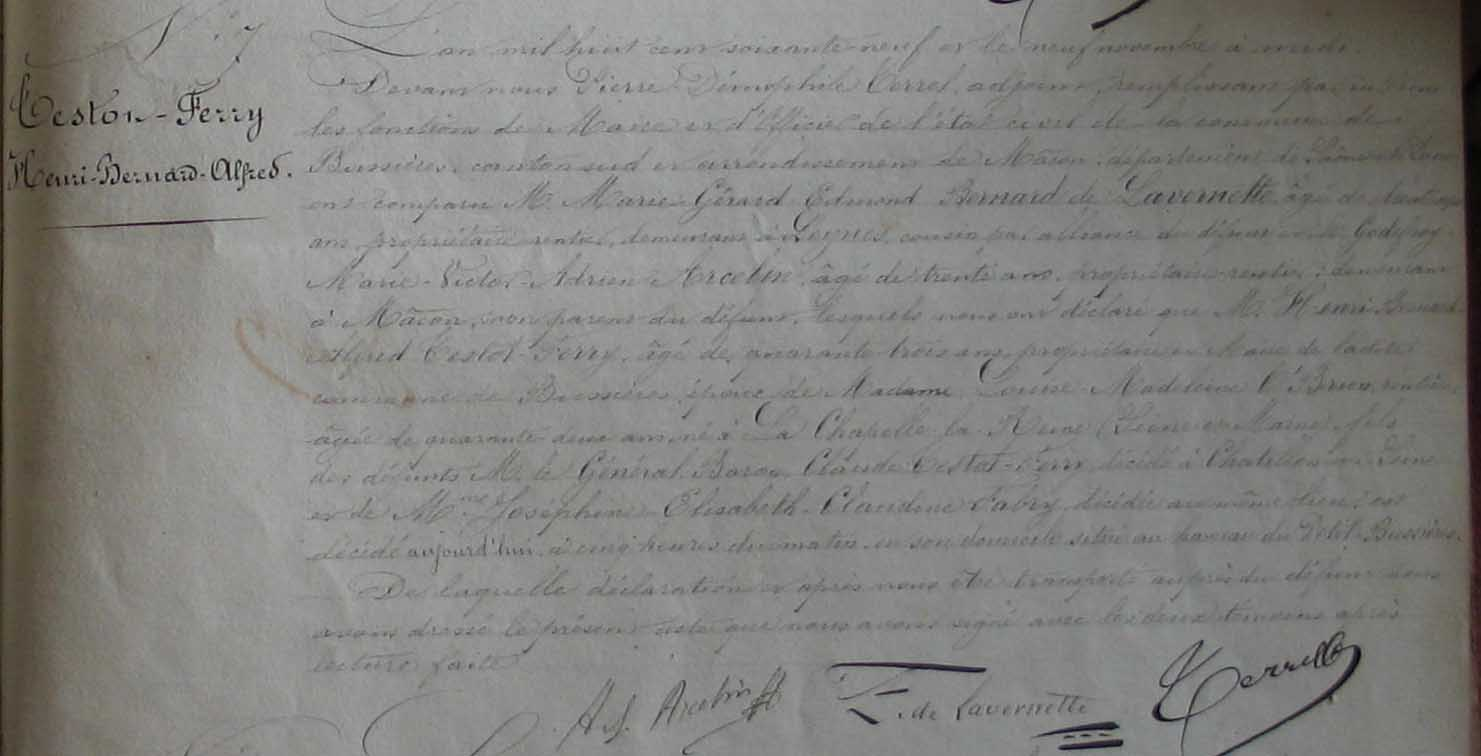
Death certificate of Henry Testot-Ferry

Testot-Ferry contributed to the scientific life of numerous institutions in France, and was:

- A founding member of the Comité de Paléontologie Française with whom he participated in writing the final 16 volumes of Paléontologie française which had been started by Alcide Dessalines d'Orbigny.
- Member of the Société Géologique de France
- Correspondent of the Linnean Society of Normandie
- Correspondent of the Société d'Émulation du Doubs
- Titulary of the Académie de Mâcon

A significant part of Testot-Ferry's reference collection of 5262 objects was bequeathed to the Muséum national d'histoire naturelle in Paris, as well as to the ainsi Musée des Ursulines in Mâcon. His grandson, André Testot-Ferry would sell another significant part of the collection to the British Museum of London in 1958.

== Anecdotes ==
- At the 1872 Brussels congress, a few years after Testot-Ferry's death, the famous anthropologist Gabriel de Morillet decided to name prehistoric cultures by the sites where they had been observed. Accordingly, he gave the name "Solutrean" to the culture discovered by Testot-Ferry near the Rock of Solutré.
- A road in Bussières, was in 2004 inaugurated Rue Henry Testot-Ferry; it runs by the house where he lived in the direction of the rock.

== Publications ==
- Henry de Ferry and Louis Édouard Gourdan de Fromentel, Paléontologie Française, Paris, 1861
- Henry de Ferry, Les Gisements archéologiques des bords de la Saône, Mâcon, 1868
- Henry de Ferry, L'Homme préhistorique en Mâconnais, 1868
- Henry de Ferry, Le Mâconnais préhistorique, Paris, 1870

== See also ==
- Claude Testot-Ferry
