= La Quina =

Archaeological site in France

Coordinates: 45.5071°N 0.2929°E

Map

La Quina is a Middle and Early Upper Palaeolithic site in Gardes-le-Pontaroux, Charente, France. Two Neanderthal skulls were found there, La Quina 5 and La Quina 18. It is the type site of the Quina Mousterian.

It was discovered in 1872, and was classified as a French monument historique in 1984.

== Gallery ==
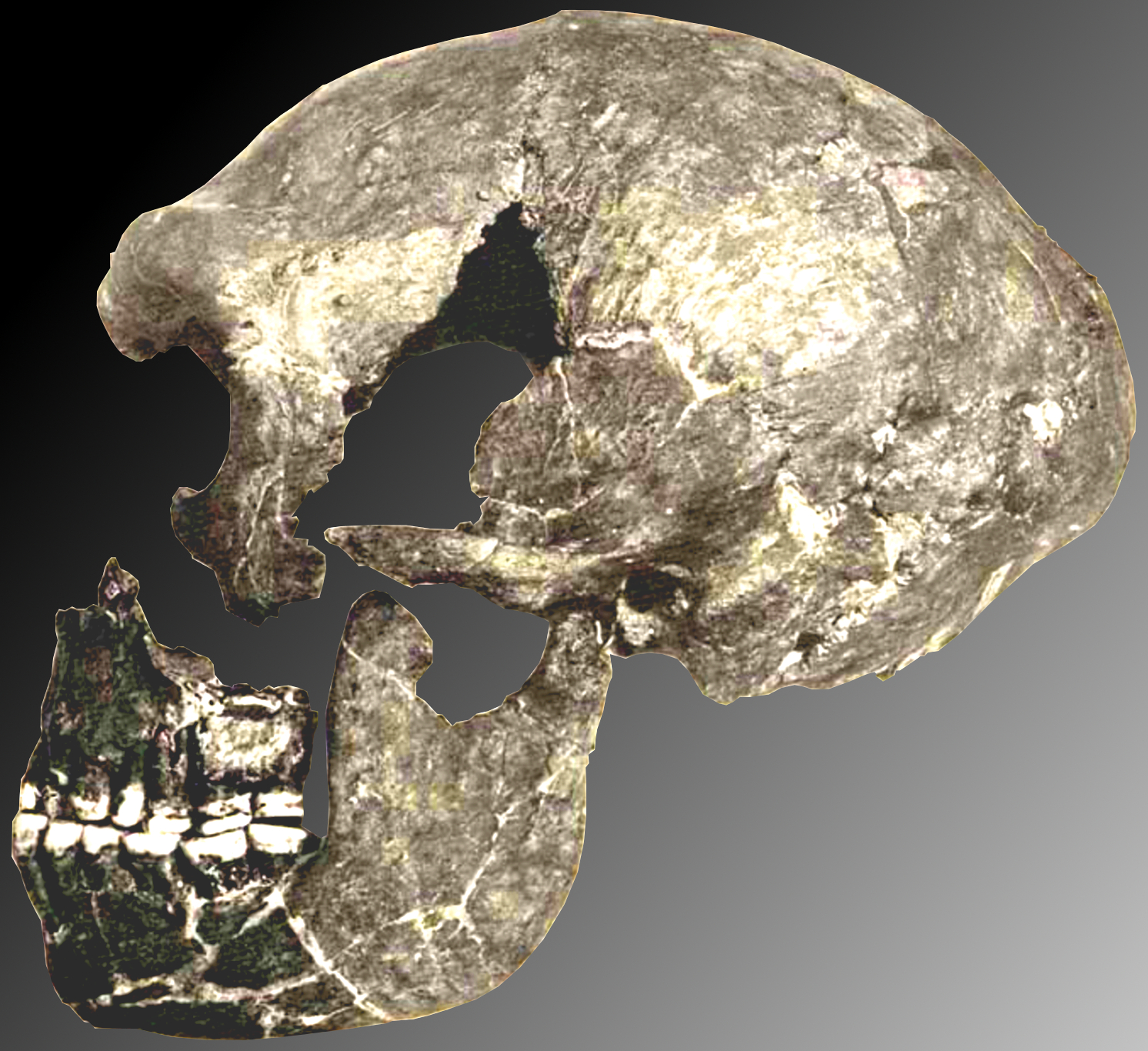
La Quina H5

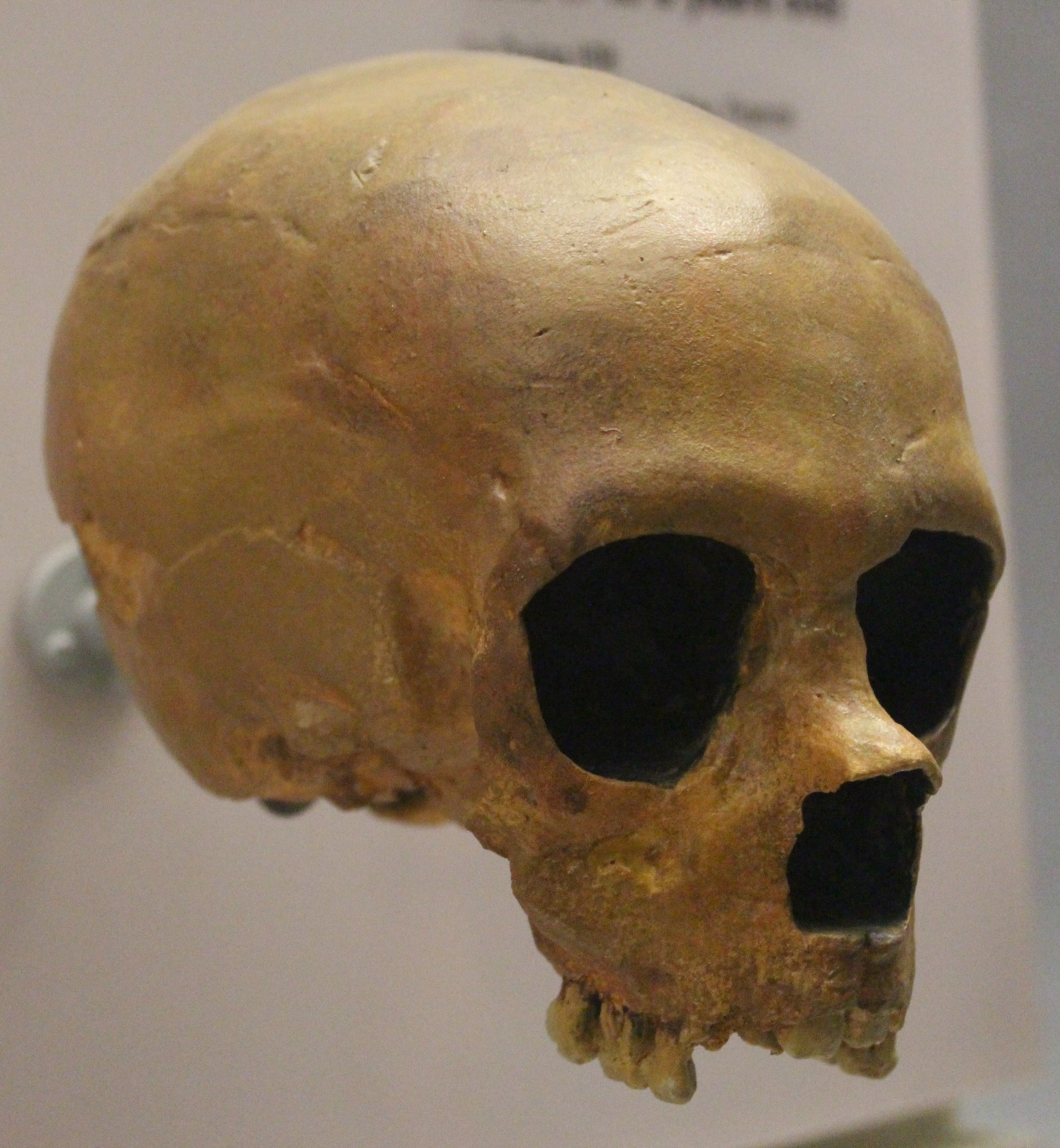
La Quina 18, a 7-8-year-old child
