= Quina Mousterian =

Class of stone tools

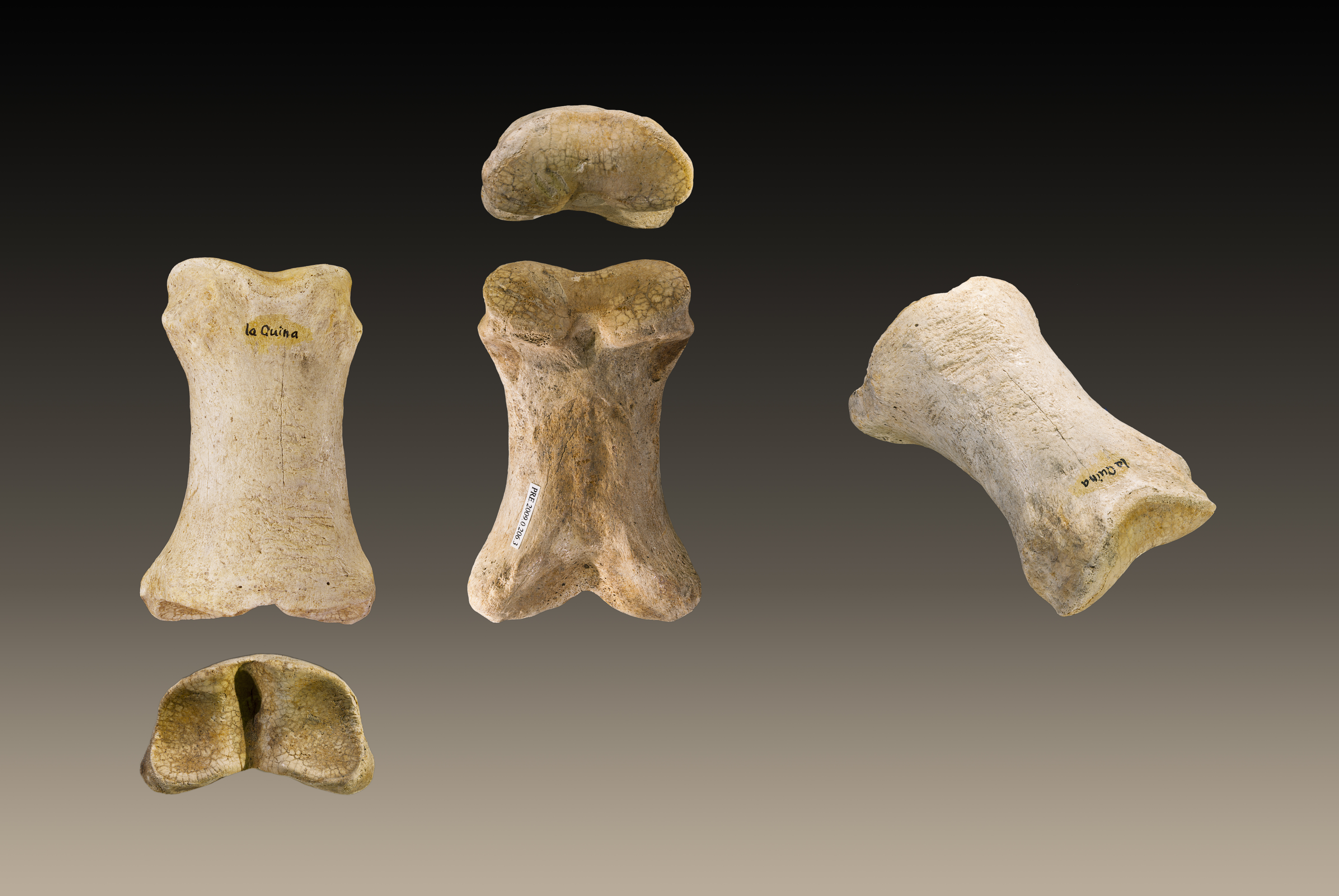
Imprint Bone from La Quina, Muséum de Toulouse

The Quina Mousterian is a variety of the Mousterian industry of the European Middle Palaeolithic, associated with Neanderthals and described by François Bordes.

== Characteristics ==
The Quina strategy emphasizes the production of thick and wide flakes, often bearing cortex, with the characteristic feature being scaled stepped ('écailleuse scalariforme') retouch. The Quina Mousterian is usually dominated by transverse scrapers and typically has a Levallois index of less than 10%.

== Discoveries ==
Quina Mousterian lithic assemblages are usually found in caves. Very few Quina assemblages have been found outside cave and rock shelters.

However, an important lithic assemblage, which was characterised by the presence of Quina tools and Levallois core reduction has recently been excavated at the Middle Palaeolithic valley settlements at the so-called "WFL site", Veldwezelt-Hezerwater, in Belgium. The researchers who uncovered those assemblages prefer to call them "Levallois core reduction with Quina tools."

Quina Mousterian lithic assemblages in Southern France mostly date to the Early Weichselian period (70,000-60,000 BP), while Quina Mousterian lithic assemblages in Belgium mostly date to the first half of the Middle Weichselian (60,000-45,000 BP).

A typical Quina Mousterian lithic assemblage is found in Axlor site, in the Basque Country (Spain), dated at the end of OIS3 (44,000 BP).

A complete Quina technological system has been reported from Longtan, Southwest China, dating to 60,000-50,000 BP.
