= History of horse domestication theories =

The history of horse domestication has been subject to much debate, with various competing hypotheses over time about how domestication of the horse occurred. The main point of contention was whether the domestication of the horse occurred once in a single domestication event, or that the horse was domesticated independently multiple times. The debate was resolved at the beginning of the 21st century using DNA evidence that favored a mixed model in which domestication of the stallion most likely occurred only once, while wild mares of various regions were included in local domesticated herds.

In the 20th century, various ideas were postulated. One set hypothesized multiple ancestral body types of the single species Equus ferus or the original wild horse, each adapted to a given environment. Another hypothesis held that prototypes originated from a single wild species and that all different body types were entirely a result of selective breeding after domestication. Yet another proposed that the theoretical prototypes were each separate species or subspecies. These theories were all based on body types and conformation, prior to the availability of DNA for research, and have since been superseded by modern studies.

== Hypotheses ==
In the past, several theories were proposed about the origin of the domesticated horse and how the variety in horse breeds developed. They generally can be subdivided in two categories, single origin versus multiple origins.

=== Single origin ===
The single origin theory holds that domestication occurred once, after which all breeds arose through selective breeding.

=== "Primitive types" ===
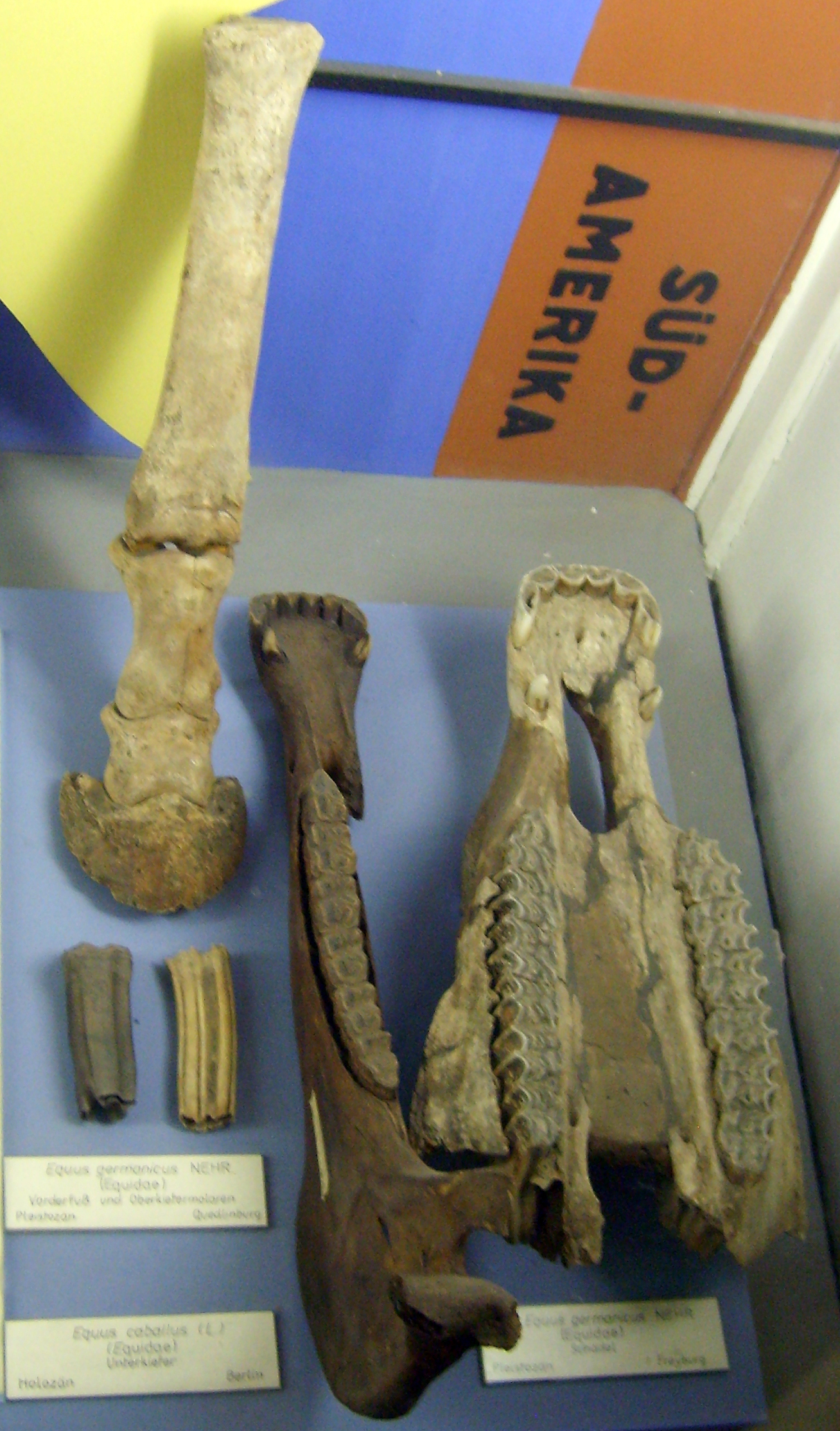
Equus caballus germanicus front leg, teeth and upper jaw at the Museum für Naturkunde, Berlin

A theory associated with James Cossar Ewart in Scotland and Johann Ulrich Duerst in Germany postulated three primitive horse types, considered subspecies of Equus caballus, as ancestors of modern breeds. They were:

- "Forest Horse", Equus caballus germanicus, descendant of a "Diluvial Horse", Equus caballus silvaticus
- Asiatic Wild Horse or Przewalski horse, then considered Equus caballus przewalskii
- Tarpan, then considered Equus caballus gmelini.

To these Elwyn Hartley Edwards adds a fourth, the "Tundra Horse", supposedly ancestor of the Yakut pony, and "largely unconsidered by hippologists".

A later theory associated with European scholars such as Jimmy Speed, Ruy d'Andrade, Hermann Ebhardt and Edward Skorkowski, postulated four basic body types, which were not considered to be named species. They were:

- Pony Type 1, in northwestern Europe, resistant to cold and wet, similar to the modern Exmoor pony
- Pony Type 2, in northern Eurasia, larger than type 1, resistant to cold, similar to the modern Highland pony and Fjord horse
- Horse Type 1, in central Asia, resistant to heat and drought, similar to the modern Sorraia and Akhal-Teke
- Horse Type 2, in western Asia, small and fine-boned, resistant to heat, similar to the modern Caspian horse.

Bennett (1998) postulated seven subspecies of E. caballus, of which four supposedly contributed most to the ancestry of the domesticated horse, both directly and via assorted crossbred lineages between them. These were:

- the "Warmblood subspecies", Equus caballus mosbachensis, the oldest hypothetical subspecies, supposedly ancestor of the Latvian horse, Groningen horse and some warmblood breeds.
- the "Draft subspecies", Equus caballus caballus, ancestor of the Exmoor Pony, Shetland pony, Suffolk Punch and Belgian horse.
- the "Oriental subspecies", Equus caballus pumpelli, adapted to arid climates, thought to be the progenitor of the modern Arabian horse, Plateau Persian and Marwari horse.
- the "Tarpan", Equus caballus gmelini or Equus caballus ferus, supposed ancestor of Przewalski's Horse as well as the Konik, Vyatka horse, Hucul and most Mongolian horses.

The other three proposed subspecies were:

- the Przewalski Horse, Equus caballus przewalskii
- the "Lamut Horse", Equus caballus alaskae and
- the "American Glacial Horse", Equus caballus laurentius or Equus caballus midlandensis.

== Modern theory ==
Modern genetic evidence now points at a single domestication event for a limited number of stallions, combined with repeated restocking of wild mares into domesticated herds. This suggests that different body types might be a combination of both selective breeding and semi-feral landrace traits.

A study in 2012 that performed genomic sampling on 300 work horses from local areas as well as a review of previous studies of archaeology, mitochondrial DNA, and Y-DNA suggested that horses were originally domesticated in the western part of the Eurasian steppe. Both domesticated stallions and mares spread out from this area, and then some additional wild mares were added from local herds; wild mares were easier to handle than wild stallions. Most other parts of the world were ruled out as sites for horse domestication, either due to climate unsuitable for an indigenous wild horse population or no evidence of domestication. It remains possible that a second, independent, domestication site might exist in the Iberian Peninsula, but the study could neither confirm nor disprove that hypothesis.

The Przewalski's horse (now Equus ferus przewalskii) is currently believed to be unrelated to the modern domestic horse, though studies using DNA have had varied results. Recent mitochondrial DNA analysis suggests that the Przewalski and the modern domestic horse diverged some 160,000 years ago. Studies using DNA have been inconclusive. A 2009 molecular study using ancient DNA (that is DNA recovered from archaeological finds like bones and teeth) places the Przewalski's horse in the middle of the domesticated horses. These difficulties exist in part due to crossing domestic horses into the Przewalski's horse as well as the limited genetic variation present in the founder population of the modern Przewalski's horse.

Chariot burials about 2500 BCE present the most direct hard evidence of horses used as working animals. Indirect evidence suggests that horses were ridden long before they were driven, approximately 3500 BCE. One theory proposed was that the modern horse is descended from the Botai culture (in present-day Kazakhstan) where horses were milked and possibly ridden more than 5,000 years ago. A study of ancient and modern horse DNA concluded that modern horses do share a small amount of DNA with Botai horses but modern horses are not descendants of Botai horses. Przewalski's horse and Botai horses were both descendants of another domesticated horse they called the Borly4.

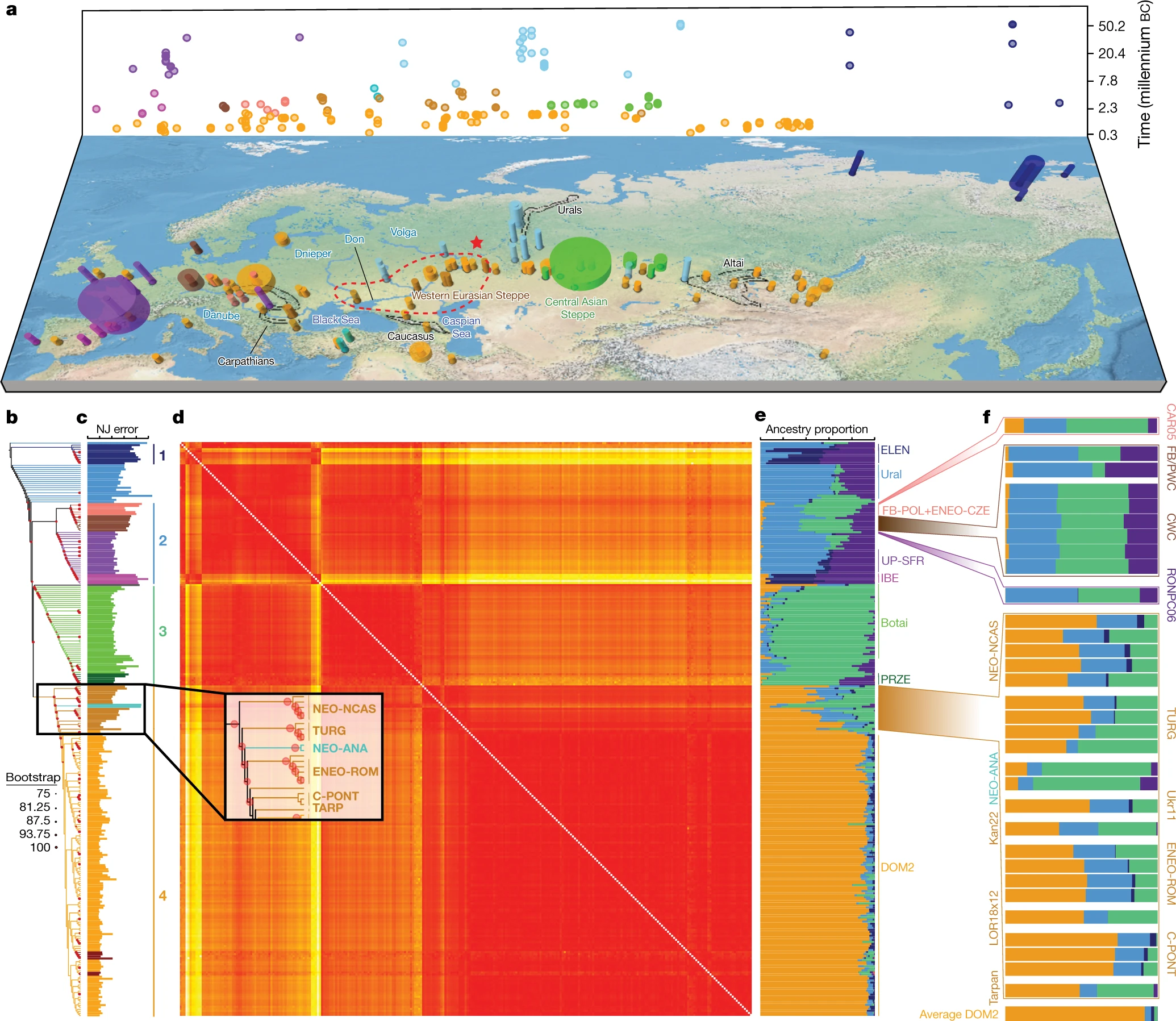
Ancient horse remains and their genomic affinities.

However, modern domesticated breeds do not descend from the earliest domestic horse lineage at Botai. In 2021, it was reported that, according to a comprehensive genetic analysis, today's domestic horses descend from the lower Volga-Don region, Russia. 273 ancient horse genomes indicate that these populations replaced almost all local populations as they expanded rapidly throughout Eurasia from about 4200 years ago. It also shows that certain adaptations were strongly selected for by horse riding, and that equestrian material culture – including Sintashta spoke-wheeled chariots (but not Indo-European languages) spread alongside. In the case of Asia Indo-Iranian languages, chariots and horses spread together, "following the early second millennium BC Sintashta culture".

== See also ==
- Evolution of the horse
