= Douglas W. Owsley =

American anthropologist (born 1951)

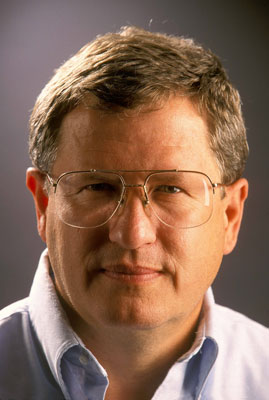
- Born: July 21, 1951 (age 75); Sheridan, Wyoming, U.S.
- Education: University of Wyoming; University of Tennessee
- Known for: study and analysis of Kennewick Man; plaintiff Bonnichsen, et al. v. United States, et al.; identification and analysis of American Airlines Flight 77 victims at the Pentagon and the siege on the Branch Davidian compound in Waco, Texas
- Spouse: Susan Owsley
- Awards: Commander's Award for Civilian Service; Jefferson Award
- Scientific career
- Fields: Forensic anthropology
- Workplaces: Smithsonian Institution's National Museum of Natural History
- Thesis: Dermatoglyphic Variability and Asymmetry of Patients with Cleft Lip and Cleft Palate (1978)
- Doctoral advisor: William M. Bass
- Other academic advisors: George W. Gill; Richard Jantz

Douglas W. Owsley (born July 21, 1951) is an American anthropologist who is the curator of Biological Anthropology at the Smithsonian's National Museum of Natural History (NMNH). He is a respected and well-known forensic anthropologist and archaeologist who has been involved in several high-profile investigations. In September 2001, he provided scientific analysis at the military mortuary located at Dover Air Force Base, following the 9/11 attack in Washington, D.C. The following year, the US Department of Defense honored him with the Commander's Award for Civilian Service for helping in the identification of 60 federal and civilian victims who died when American Airlines Flight 77 hit the Pentagon.

Other notable cases include analysis and identification of Jeffrey Dahmer's first victim; excavation and study of the H. L. Hunley Confederate submarine in Charleston Harbor; excavation of the historic Jamestown Colony; analysis and identification of 82 victims of the siege at the Branch Davidian compound near Waco, Texas; processing and identification of US servicemen killed during Operation Desert Storm; and research, analysis, and identification of individuals buried in 17th-century iron coffins discovered in the Chesapeake Bay area of Maryland.

Owsley was also involved in the debate over claims of ownership and ancestry of the Kennewick Man, which he analysed and erroneously concluded that the remains were not related to present-day Native Americans. The 1996 discovery of the skeletal remains of the prehistoric Paleo-Indian man dating back to a calibrated age of 9,800 years in Kennewick, Washington, along the Columbia River sparked much academic debate and resulted in an extended court battle that Owsley was a party to. He has worked on archaeological excavations and skeletal analyses on populations from colonial North America, Plains Indians and from Polynesia. As part of his work with the Smithsonian, he has overseen the forensic examination of over 13,000 skeletons and human remains originating from over an estimated 10,000 years ago.

Owsley's 2003 biography, No Bone Unturned: Inside the World of a Top Forensic Scientist and His Work on America's Most Notorious Crimes and Disasters, was published by HarperCollins, and served as the basis of a Discovery Channel documentary entitled Skeleton Clues, as well as an ABC News 20/20 segment entitled Murders, Mysteries, History Revealed in Bones. He was also featured in the film Nightmare in Jamestown, produced by National Geographic. In 2005, Owsley was honored alongside other influential figures in the list of "35 Who Made a Difference," published in the November issue of the Smithsonian Magazine.

== Personal background ==
Douglas W. Owsley was born on July 21, 1951, in Sheridan, Wyoming. He is the son of William "Bill" and Norma Lou (née Cooke) Owsley. The family lived in the ranching community of Lusk, Wyoming, located in the eastern part of the state, 20 miles (32 km) from the Nebraska state border. His father was a game warden with the Wyoming Game and Fish Department, while his mother was a painter and stained glass artist. During his youth, Owsley attended Sunday school classes at the St. George's Episcopal Church of Lusk.

The 2 square miles (5.2 km^{2}) that made up the Lusk community is surrounded by the eastern extension of the Black Hills National Forest. The nearby forest and foothills stirred Owsley's interest in nature and science. Highly interested in the biology of animals, he grew up viewing wildlife and their carcasses as specimens from which to learn. He often asked questions of his teachers, displaying an "unquenchable curiosity" and desire to learn. When he was a child, he viewed his first archaeological excavation, when he joined his father on one of his job sites. While his father spent most of his time at work, Owsley participated in scouting, eventually reaching the rank of an Eagle Scout.

When he was nine years old, Owsley set up a makeshift chemistry lab in the family basement, using tools and materials that came with a Christmas gift. One day, he began experimenting and combined some of his chemicals with some of his mother's bathroom cleaning solutions and developed an anesthetic. Testing out his new concoction, he discovered that he could cause the native brown-spotted horned toad (or lizard) to fall asleep and become temporarily unconscious. Out of curiosity, he cut open a toad to take a closer look at the internal organs. He recorded everything that happened, noting that the heart continued beating and the lungs continued to draw breath. Afterwards, he carefully closed the wound with supplies from his mother's sewing kit. When the toad continued to show signs of life, apparently unharmed, he released it safely in the backyard pond.

In summer 1962, Owsley and Lyon were exploring an abandoned silver mine, when they discovered the skeletal remains of a large horse. Fascinated, they raced home and returned with their red wagons to gather the bones and take them to their converted chicken coop lab on the Lyon property. They wanted to reassemble the bones and build the horse's skeleton, similar to the dinosaur skeletons they saw in their school's science films. Once all of the bones were transported to the "lab", they spread the bones out and sorted them by size and shape. Over the summer, without the assistance of textbooks or diagrams, they spent their free time matching various bones that looked like they fit together, much like assembling a jigsaw puzzle. After two months, in the last week of their summer break, the boys finished rebuilding the horse skeleton. Owsley later said, "When we're scientists someday, I'll bet we could be in National Geographic."

Marriage and family

When Owsley was growing up in Lusk, Wyoming, his future wife was living just four blocks away. They grew up in the same neighborhood and attended the same schools. When Susie celebrated with him at his second grade birthday party, he developed a crush. By the time he was in tenth grade, the attraction was mutual. He told her that he would marry her someday. Following high school, other priorities took over when Susie went on to nursing school in Denver, Colorado, and Owsley enrolled at the University of Wyoming. After they both graduated, they returned to Lusk and married in their neighborhood church. After their wedding, they relocated to the University of Tennessee, where Owsley continued his education and his wife joined the nursing staff of the university.

In May 1978, just prior to Owsley receiving his Ph.D. in anthropology from the University of Tennessee, their first daughter, Hilary was born. Their second daughter, Kimberly was born two years later, in September 1980. As of 2013, Owsley and his wife reside in a rural farmhouse on 30 acres (12 ha; 0.047 sq mi) in Jeffersonton, Virginia.

== Educational background ==
University of Wyoming

After graduation from Niobrara County High School in 1969, Owsley began pursuing a medical career, studying Zoology at the University of Wyoming. He was a "straight A student", earning perfect scores while preparing to go to medical school. Owsley had plans to become a physician.

During his junior year, Owsley signed up for an introductory course in anthropology taught by George Gill, who became a valuable mentor to him. The following year, Gill suggested that he consider signing up for a couple of graduate-level classes focusing on human evolution and osteology. At the end of the semester, he recorded the highest scores in both classes, ahead of the current graduate students. Excited with what he was discovering in these two classes, Owsley began considering a career in anthropology.

During Owsley's senior year, one of his classmates found what appeared to be a human skull, while exploring the Absaroka Range, near Meeteetse, Wyoming. Gill reported the discovery of the remains to the Wyoming State archaeologist's Office, who authorized him to recover it. Prompted by Owsley's enthusiasm with learning more about the study of skeletal remains, Gill invited him to accompany him when he went to the site to excavate the remains.

Following his professor's lead, Owsley assisted with the excavation, using tools to carefully remove the surrounding soil and organic materials to reveal the remains of two Native Americans wrapped in buffalo robes. Careful not to disturb or move the remains, they photographed the bodies to document the exact position in which they were found. After returning to the university campus, Owsley switched his major from pre-med to anthropology.

Later that same year, Gill took Owsley with him to Mexico to participate in an archaeological dig, where he assisted in excavating ancient Aztec remains. Gill served as his academic advisor and continued as a mentor throughout his life. Of the initial excavation in Mexico, Gill remembers, "Doug was naive and wide-eyed. He didn't even know where Kansas was, and it was two states over. But he was tremendously intelligent and inquisitive."

One summer, Gill invited Owsley to attend the annual American Association of Physical Anthropologists meeting held in Kansas. While at the conference, Owsley met Dr. Bill Bass, the chair of the University of Tennessee's anthropology department, who was recognized as the most well-respected and in-demand forensic anthropologists in the US, having recovered more American Indian remains than any other scientist working in the same field. Following their introduction, Bass invited him to apply to the school's new program at the Anthropological Research Facility.

University of Tennessee, Knoxville

After receiving his Bachelor of Science degree in zoology in 1973, Owsley enrolled at the University of Tennessee, where he simultaneously served as an assistant professor. It was here that he completed his Master's degree and earned his Ph.D. in Physical Anthropology in 1978. During this time, he worked with Bass, as well as Dr. Richard Jantz, who both greatly influenced him in his career.

In choosing the topic for his Master's thesis, Bass convinced Owsley to study skeletal remains discovered in the Arikara Larson Village and cemetery in South Dakota, alongside the Missouri River and present a demographic analysis of the tribe that lived in the area. The initial discovery of the village was part of the Smithsonian's participation in the Missouri River Basin Surveys Project, sponsored by the federal government between 1945 and 1969. The program provided for the excavation of roughly 500,000 square miles (1,300,000 km^{2}) of the basin for archaeological remains in long-abandoned cemeteries that would soon be washed away due to the building of a new local dam and reservoir. Bass had recovered human remains in the area on behalf of the Smithsonian from 1956 to 1970.

Under the direction of Bass, Owsley reviewed and identified the age and gender of 762 of the Arikara excavated during the survey project. Gender indicated both male and female, but there was wide discrepancy in the ages of the individuals. The number of deceased men was high, but there were only a handful of children or young child-bearing women found in the village. This analytical data provided the basis for Owsley's Master's thesis. He included a comparative study of the mortality rates of both genders and presented a viable rationale for the wide gap in the age at death among the Arikara people.

The demographic study showed a wide gap between the individuals found in the burial grounds and those discovered around the village. Approximately 700 tribal members were recovered in the cemetery with indications they received formal ceremonial burials. Owsley showed that all tribe members that had not been buried had died at the same time. Sixty-five Arikara were discovered in member homes and scattered around the village. Forty-four individuals were discovered in one family home, huddled up together.

Following a meeting with his professor, they were both in agreement in attributing the discrepancy in the data to a widespread health epidemic, most likely smallpox. Historical records showed that it was common for smallpox victims to be abandoned by their families and neighbors. While some families would simply pick up and leave the area, others would burn the entire village to avoid risk of the further spread of the disease. Owsley and his professor reasoned that Arikara had deserted the afflicted and burned the town prior to leaving. With this understanding, his thesis was complete and submitted to the school.

Soon thereafter, Owsley and his professor were jointly presenting an Intro to Physical Anthropology class. At one point while Bass was speaking, Owsley began daydreaming and found himself staring at the box of skulls from the Arikara village that were being used as visual tools. He noticed straight edge incisions on the front and side of each skull that were not previously detected. Prior to completion of his thesis, he wrote a term paper in an archaeology class that focused on evidence of scalping in the Deep South. The markings on the heads of the Arikara clearly indicated that the village members had been scalped.

Directly after the class lecture ended, Owsley brought his discovery to the attention of Bass, who had studied the skulls for over a decade, but had never noticed the markings. Rather than focus on physical characteristics or determining cause of death, Bass and several of the doctoral students who had researched the bones, had focused their analysis on determining age and gender, while providing measurements to identify tribe and origin of the remains. The more time he spent studying the remains following this discovery, the more Owsley became convinced that his thesis was inaccurate in attributing the death of the villagers to smallpox.

During further analysis of the skeletal remains discovered in the village, it became clear that the only tribe members that were not scalped, had died earlier from fire or decapitation. Some tribe members were also missing one or both of their hands from the wrist down. Rather than a health epidemic, it became clear to Owsley at that point that the Arikara village was violently attacked by an enemy tribe. This not only explained why the scattered villagers did not receive a formal burial, but additionally indicated that the younger women were forcefully taken from their families and home by their attackers.

After presenting his findings to his professor, Bass insisted that he present his discovery to professional archaeologists and professors attending a conference in Lincoln, Nebraska. While Owsley had attended several conferences before, he had never spoken or presented professionally. He was also considerably introverted, with little experience speaking in front of a large group. At the conference, he spoke in front of over 200 people, using visual slides to present his findings, along with physical demonstrations of the manner of death suffered by the members of the Arikara tribe. The academic crowd was unaccustomed to the level of research presented or the graphic evidence of the attack on the village.

Owsley concluded his presentation by sharing that he had initially attributed the death of the villagers to smallpox, stating that "We see what we are trained to see." At the time, based on his training, he believed that the conclusion reflected the evidence. In reality, his research was made to fit the results presented. His final words and encouragement to the conference attendees addressed this error.

We have to be able to step back and open our eyes more broadly and focus on greater details. We have to make the conclusion fit the data, not the other way around.

—Douglas, W. Owsley

During Owsley's doctoral studies at the University of Tennessee, he had been working with the hospital pediatrics department at the school. The focus of his work involved the study of children with facial birth defects, specifically, children born with a cleft lip and palate. Cleft lip appears as anything from a slight lift in the lip to complete separation or division of the upper lip that reaches the base of the nose, meeting the lower part of the nostril. A cleft palate manifests as a partial or complete separation or presence of the roof of the mouth. In many cases, the child is born with a completely nonexistent roof of the mouth.

In his final year of school, Owsley looked back over his educational background, considering several possible topics for his doctoral dissertation. He eventually chose to draw on his knowledge and understanding of craniofacial abnormalities. His dissertation provided an evaluation of the biological developmental process called canalization, along with an indepth study of dermal ridges and their correlation to cranial growth, facial symmetry, and genetic variations. Owsley knew that his practical work experience and education of facial deformities was vital to success in his future career in forensic anthropology, paleoanthropology, and forensic facial reconstruction. His understanding of cranial anomalies and variations would prove essential to accurately assessing age, gender, and racial background of deceased individuals; mapping and measuring skulls and cranial cavities; assisting law enforcement and government officials with the conviction of individuals under investigation and charged with criminal acts; reconstruction of facial features and appearance to assist in identification of deceased individuals; or reconstruction and enhanced aging of missing children to assist in possible identification and recovery.

Postdoctoral education

After Owsley received his Ph.D. in 1978, he began working part-time with the Anthropological Research Facility at the University of Tennessee. During this first year, he continued to develop and enhance his skills by working with Bass and visiting local crime scenes, where he became further drawn to the profession of forensic science and the study of human remains.

In 1979, at the prompting of Bass, Owsley served a semester interning with Dr. Charles Merbs at Arizona State University, where he was introduced to the study of ancient diseases. In summer 1980, Owsley interned with forensic anthropologist, Dr. Walt Birkby, who had been the first student of Dr. Bass at the University of Tennessee.

== Professional background ==
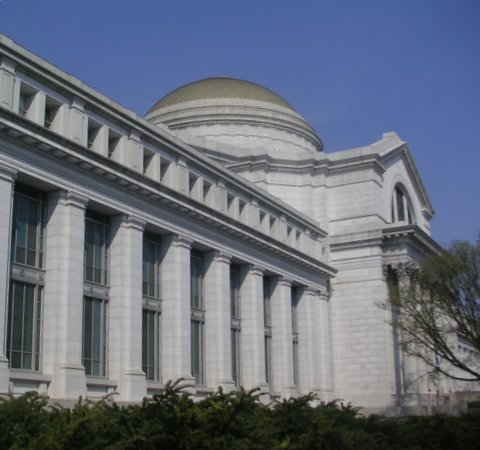
National Museum of Natural History on the National Mall in Washington, D.C.

In 1980, Owsley joined the faculty at Louisiana State University on a full-time basis. Initially, he began working with North American collections. While other anthropologists were traveling to exotic locales, he considered his work with Plains Indians a practical choice, due to his lack of financial resources. While working at Louisiana State, he was the only forensic anthropologist on staff. Mary Manhein, who later established the FACES laboratory at LSU, worked with Owsley as a volunteer.

The focus of Owsley's career involved directly working with law enforcement to identify skeletal and human remains that were discovered primarily at crime scenes and local construction sites. It was during his time at LSU that the focus of his career in forensic anthropology became firmly established. In summer 1981, Owsley returned to join Bass for the summer, performing research in the bone lab and body farm. His family joined him in Knoxville, where they lived together on campus.

One summer day, during a visit to see Owsley in the lab, it became evident to Bass that his colleague was ill. Visibly fatigued and experiencing shortness of breath, rather than go to the doctor, he went home to his wife and family. Later that night, when Owsley started coughing up blood, Susie immediately assessed his condition and took him to one of her former colleagues, who diagnosed a lung infection from an unknown source. Blood tests and sputum samples came back positive for incurable small cell lung cancer.

Just 30 years old, Owsley received a medical diagnosis that essentially served as a death sentence. Fully understanding the ramifications of the situation, Owsley and his wife chose to face the problem, while refusing to accept defeat. Susie's own professional background and medical knowledge kicked in and she began to determine the best course of action. That evening, she contacted the physician and challenged the diagnosis. She provided a profile of her husband that directly ruled out commonalities found in lung cancer patients.

Early the next day, rather than return to work, Owsley was admitted to the hospital, where he underwent a bronchoscopy. The tests confirmed Susie's beliefs that the abnormalities found in her husband's lungs were attributed to a source other than malignant tumors. The tests revealed scar tissues and inflammation. Following an accurate diagnosis of lung infection, rather than lung cancer, Owsley was prescribed antibiotics and healed quickly.

The source of the lung infection was traced to unhealthy conditions in the bone lab, which was located directly beneath Neyland Stadium's football field. Owsley often worked up to 16 hours a day in damp surroundings that cultivated toxic organic mold. Daily exposure to the mildew conditioned Owsley's lungs, making them into a virtual petri dish of infection. Once Owsley's health recovered, Bass, along with the school administration addressed the unhealthy conditions of the lab and work went back to normal at the University of Tennessee, while Owsley returned to Louisiana.

After five years on staff at Louisiana State University, Owsley was told of a promising staff opening with the Smithsonian Institution's National Museum of Natural History. The museum was looking for a curator to oversee their large inventory and museum display of American Indian remains. While he was interested in working with the Smithsonian, Owsley was convinced that the competition would be too steep. He had long held the Smithsonian up as the epitome of anthropological institutions and reasoned that he had only held his Ph.D. for a short time, with limited professional experience utilizing his educational background and skills. While he was interested in someday joining the staff of the Smithsonian, he didn't believe that his current credentials would interest the recruiters, so he avoided applying for the position.

In 1987, Dr. Bass, who had a professional history working with the Smithsonian for over 30 years, encouraged Owsley to respond to another recruitment notice. By this time, he had gained experience researching over 2,000 human remains discovered and excavated from archaeological dig sites, crime scenes, cemeteries, and battlefields. Owsley was hired, after submitting an application, along with a professional recommendation from Bass. He was brought on staff, following the death of biological anthropologist John Lawrence Angel. At that time, he hired Robert W. Mann as his assistant. Mann had previously been serving as Bass' assistant at the University of Tennessee. Mann left the organization in 1992, choosing to join the staff at the Joint POW/MIA Accounting Command's Central Identification Laboratory in Hawaii. Owsley brought on Karin "Kari" (née Sandness) Bruwelheide, who he had met during an earlier visit to the University of Nebraska–Lincoln's College of Arts and Sciences, where she earned a Master of Arts degree in Physical Anthropology.

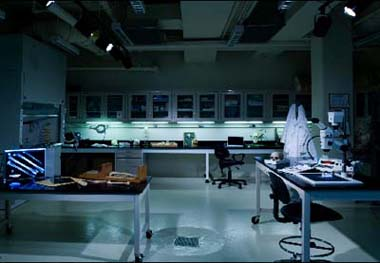
Forensic Anthropology lab at the National Museum of Natural History, Washington, D.C.

Three years later, he was promoted and became the Division Head of Physical Anthropology. Much of his work is done in collaboration with Dr. Dennis Stanford, director of the Department of Archaeology, and fellow forensic anthropologist, Kari Bruwelheide, who states,

We treat all remains coming into the lab as individuals, each with a unique life story reflected in his or her skeleton. The desire to learn more about the person encourages us to try new technologies and methods of obtaining even greater amounts of information. It is detective work of the most satisfying kind because it tells us just a little bit more of the human story.

—Kari Bruwelheide, Forensic Anthropologist with the Smithsonian Institution

In defining his work, Owsley states, "You can learn more about a person from their bones than from anything else."

While he was raised in the local St. George's Episcopal Church of Lusk, where he attended services on Sundays and served as an altar boy, Owsley eventually stopped believing in God and life after death. In his professional role, he never mentions his lack of faith, understanding that his position often brings him into contact with individuals who are grieving the death of their loved ones. Holding on to religion and deeply held spiritual convictions about death and dying seemed to help the families of the victims he was working with cope better with the sense of pain and loss.

=== Prominent excavations and investigations ===
Owsley's primary research is focused on human skeletal remains from the 17th-century Chesapeake region of Virginia and Maryland. The results of this research have been presented to the public in an exhibition at the Smithsonian's Museum of Natural History entitled "Written in Bone: Forensic Files of the 17th-Century Chesapeake". Dr. Owsley is the co-curator of the exhibition, along with Kari Bruwelheide. The exhibition has been held since February 7, 2009, and is scheduled to end on January 6, 2014.

==== Jeffrey Dahmer's first victim ====
On July 22, 1991, Jeffrey Dahmer was arrested for the abduction and assault of a man in Milwaukee, Wisconsin. The subsequent investigation revealed that Dahmer had been murdering young men going back to 1978. A search of his home revealed human remains stored in acid-filled vats, a human heart in the freezer, and seven skulls scattered throughout the apartment.

Prior to Dahmer's arrest in Milwaukee, a murder had been discovered in Bath, Ohio, on land belonging to Lionel Dahmer, an analytical chemist. Law enforcement officials in Ohio were unable to identify the victim and requested assistance from the FBI to solve the murder. The FBI sent the skeletal remains to Owsley at the Smithsonian. The remains equated to a collection of teeth and bone fragments that were twisted, splintered, and shattered into 286 pieces.

Thorough study of the skeletal remains lasted for over three months. Owsley was eventually able to identify the victim as 18-year-old Steven Hicks, who had disappeared in 1978. The case was particularly difficult, because the victim's body had been cut, broken, and literally chopped into several pieces. Forensics require careful identification, measuring, and matching of various sizes of bone chips, which often calls for the use of scanning electron microscopes to accurately establish the composition of the most minute chip and fragment to confirm that it is actually bone and human remains.

Successful identification remained elusive until a comparison was made of dental X-rays taken of the presumed victim with a partial dental root found among the fragments. Owsley then compared a bone from the cervical spine with an X-ray of the same location. Forensic evidence revealed that the victim's bones had been sliced and then shattered by blunt force trauma. Following the forensic analysis, Dahmer confessed to the murder, stating that he struck Hicks on the back of the head with the rod from a metal barbell and then strangled him. His body was later dismembered with a Bowie knife. Dahmer smashed the rest of the bones with a sledgehammer, then scattered the fragments around his father's backwoods property. The forensic evidence provided in the case led to Dahmer's first murder conviction.

==== American journalists in the Guatemalan Highlands ====
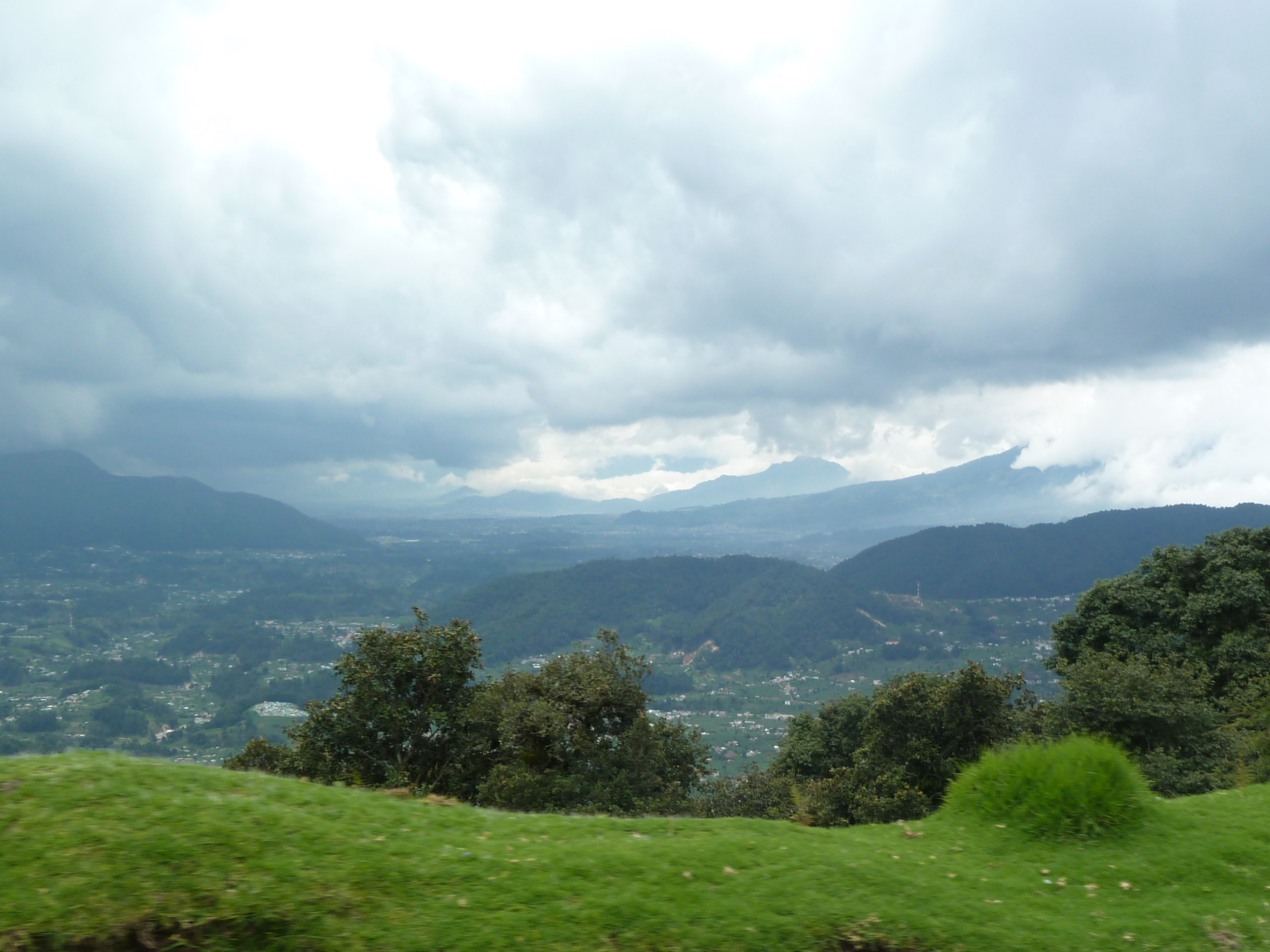
Guatemalan Highlands above El Llano

In early 1992, Owsley arrived in his office to find a telegram from the US State Department. Photographer Griffith Davis and freelance writer Nicholas Blake had been reported missing on April 8, 1985. The document on his presented a summation of the disappearance of the two American journalists while traveling in the Guatemalan Highlands, stating that the US Embassy at Guatemala had declared the rescue and recovery operations a failure.

After the seven-year FBI investigation ended in a failure, the family of Blake and Davis continued searching for leads on the whereabouts of their family members. When information about the murder of the two journalists was eventually uncovered, Randy and Sam Blake, brothers of Nicholas, along with the US Embassy, asked for Owsley's help to recover and identify the remains from the Guatemalan jungle.

The first solid lead that came in resulted from information provided by a schoolteacher in the village of Il Llano. The schoolteacher recognized photos and remembered that the journalists had camped in the schoolhouse for a night on March 28, 1985. The following morning, five or six members of a paramilitary patrol hauled the journalists from their sleep and shot them just outside the village. While clear motive was unknown, Nicholas Blake had previously traveled to the highlands and reported on human rights violations committed by the corrupt military forces in the area. The Guatemalan army had intel that Blake had returned to the jungle with a photographer, so it was surmised that the motive was related to his previous work.

In 1987, a local teacher, Justo Victoriano Martínez-Morales, had received information that the paramilitary forces were responsible for the journalists' disappearance. Martínez-Morales claimed that he knew the names of the men that killed the journalists and later burned their remains on the road to Salquil. Martínez-Morales told the US Embassy that Felipe Alva showed him where the burned remains of the journalists could be found. Alva was known as the regional commander who oversaw the military operations of over 40,000 civil patrol members.

The Blake brothers were eventually told that in exchange for $5,000 to $10,000, Alva would help them recover the remains of the journalists. In 1992, the family received a couple of wooden boxes that reportedly held the remains of Blake and Davis. Soon after arrival, the Blake brothers brought the boxes to Owsley, who discovered organic material, four metal tent poles, a bone socket, burned bone fragments, and one tooth. For the most part, the bones were fully cremated, removing organic elements that would assist in the identification process. Unfortunately, only those of Griffith Davis were able to be identified, which would lead the Blake brothers back to Guatemala in search of the actual site of the murder and subsequent cremation base of the journalists. The Blake family contacted Alva and let him know that due to inconclusive identification of the remains, they would need to return to Guatemala, accompanied with expert anthropologists.

On June 11, 1992, the Blake brothers chartered a jet to Nebaj, Guatemala, along with Owsley; colleague John Verano, professor of anthropology with Tulane University; and Colonel Otto Noack-Sierra of the Guatemalan Army. They traveled two hours on foot through the Guatemalan jungle to the burn site. Owsley got down on his hands and knees and began sifting through the ash and charcoal, mixed with brown soil. He was skeptical and soon realized that they were led by Alva to a false cremation site. The ground was brown and moist, unlike the red clay soil that arrived in the crates in Washington D.C.

Once the deception of Alva was uncovered, Noack directly confronted Alva, demanding under threat of death to direct the party to the accurate site. The following day, the team returned to El Llano in a helicopter with a patrolman who reportedly knew the exact spot where the journalists' remains could be found. Colonel handed Owsley a grenade, telling him "Here, Doug, you may need this. Put it in your pocket." Surrounded by Noack and a group of Guatemalan Army Rangers in military fatigues, the team returned to El Llano, fully protected. They entered the schoolhouse where the journalists spent the night and began learning more about the truth about what happened in 1985.

Confident that they had a promising lead, the team headed out on rented helicopters the next day, traveling approximately 90 miles northwest of Guatemala City. After their arrival in the mountains above El Llano, Owsley quickly found the location of the charred remains of the murdered journalists and began collecting human remains and artifacts commingled in the dirt. After the excavation, he prepared the bone fragments and artifacts for transport, and returned to Washington, D.C. Once the remains were examined in his laboratory at the Smithsonian, Owsley was able to make a positive identification of both individuals.

In 1998, the Inter-American Court of Human Rights convened, during which testimony was offered that brought to light the events prior to and following the murder of Nicholas Blake and Griffith Davis. Martínez-Morales learned that were arrested in El Llano and taken by Mario Cano, Commander of the El Llano Civil Patrol. Cano ordered members of the civil patrol to take the Blake and Davis out of the area and kill them. Hipólito García killed Davis, while two other patrolmen shot Blake. Their bodies were dumped and left in the hills for two years, after which Alva ordered Daniel Velásquez, Commander of Las Majadas, to collect the remains and burn the evidence. Velásquez, rather than carry out the orders himself, instructed Cano to make it happen.

Cano discovered that civil patrol members started a fire circle to burn the bones. The locals of El Llano had long known the identity of the murderers. Two individuals specifically identified through photos were Candelario Cano-Herrera and Mario Cano. In response, they were ordered to travel to the military zone of Huehuetenango and appear before Colonel George Hooker of the US Embassy, but they refused to comply. As of 2012, the parties responsible for the deaths of Nicholas Blake and Griffith Davis have not been brought to justice.

==== 17th-century Chesapeake Bay lead coffin excavations ====
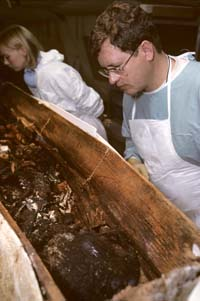
Smithsonian forensic anthropologists Douglas Owsley and Kari Bruwelheide examine the burial and remains of Anne Wolseley Calvert

In 1990, three lead coffins were discovered buried in the Chesapeake Bay area of St. Mary's City, Maryland, during a remote sensing survey at the foundation of the 17th-century Brick Chapel Catholic Church, on land that had been used as a cornfield for centuries. Owsley was asked to assist in the identification of the remains.

The bodies were believed to belong to Phillip Calvert, fifth Governor of Maryland, his wife, and his infant daughter by his second wife, Jane Sewell. Following forensic examination, Owsley confirmed the identification of Anne Wolsely Calvert. As the wife of the governor, she was a woman of high social standing in historic St. Mary's City, making her home in a large, red brick mansion known as "St. Peters". In 1678, her home was the largest colonial mansion in English America. She would have owned the highest quality and most desired material possessions available in the colony. Her teeth were in very poor shape, indicating that she had access to sugar, which was only available in low quantities and highly prohibitive to others due to the financial cost. Her consumption of sweeteners had a destructive effect on her teeth.

On November 9, 1992, Owsley began his study of the remains, which eventually revealed that Calvert lived with an acute fracture of one of her thighbones, which shortened the length of her leg. The best the local doctors could do for her was to recommend bed rest so that the bone would have a greater chance to heal properly. The analysis also showed that an infection had developed at the fracture, which would have caused chronic pain throughout her life.

Attempting to identify the male remains found in the lead coffin was a bit more difficult. Burial in lead coffins reflected prominence in the Roman Catholic Church. At the time of death, the man had been in his early 50s. The study showed that he was right handed and stood about five and a half feet tall, with muscle attachments that suggested that he lived a lifestyle other than farming or manual labor. A lack of pollen in the coffin indicated that he died during the winter. There were several clues in place, based on cultural aspects of the time, which included societal status, wealth, and religion. All of these clues established that the individual fell within these characteristic traits, which assisted in an accurate identification of the remains.

Historical data indicated that the death occurred after 1667, when the Brick Chapel was built, and prior to 1705, when the doors of the church were locked by legal decree of the Royal Governor. For practical reasons, the individual also had to live close enough to the church to have been buried there. Through a process of elimination, Owsley, along with professional historians determined that the coffin held the remains of Philip Calvert, youngest son of George Calvert, 1st Baron Baltimore.

==== Waco Branch Davidian compound victims ====
On February 28, 1993, outside of Waco, Texas, violence erupted during an attempt by the United States Bureau of Alcohol, Tobacco and Firearms (ATF) to execute a search warrant on a Protestant group of religious adherents disfellowshipped from the Seventh-day Adventist Church. Allegations were made against the Branch Davidians that they were stockpiling illegal weapons at their headquarters at Mount Carmel. Shortly after officials approached the compound, gunfire erupted, which lasted nearly two hours. After the initial exchange of gunfire was over, four agents and six Branch Davidians were dead.

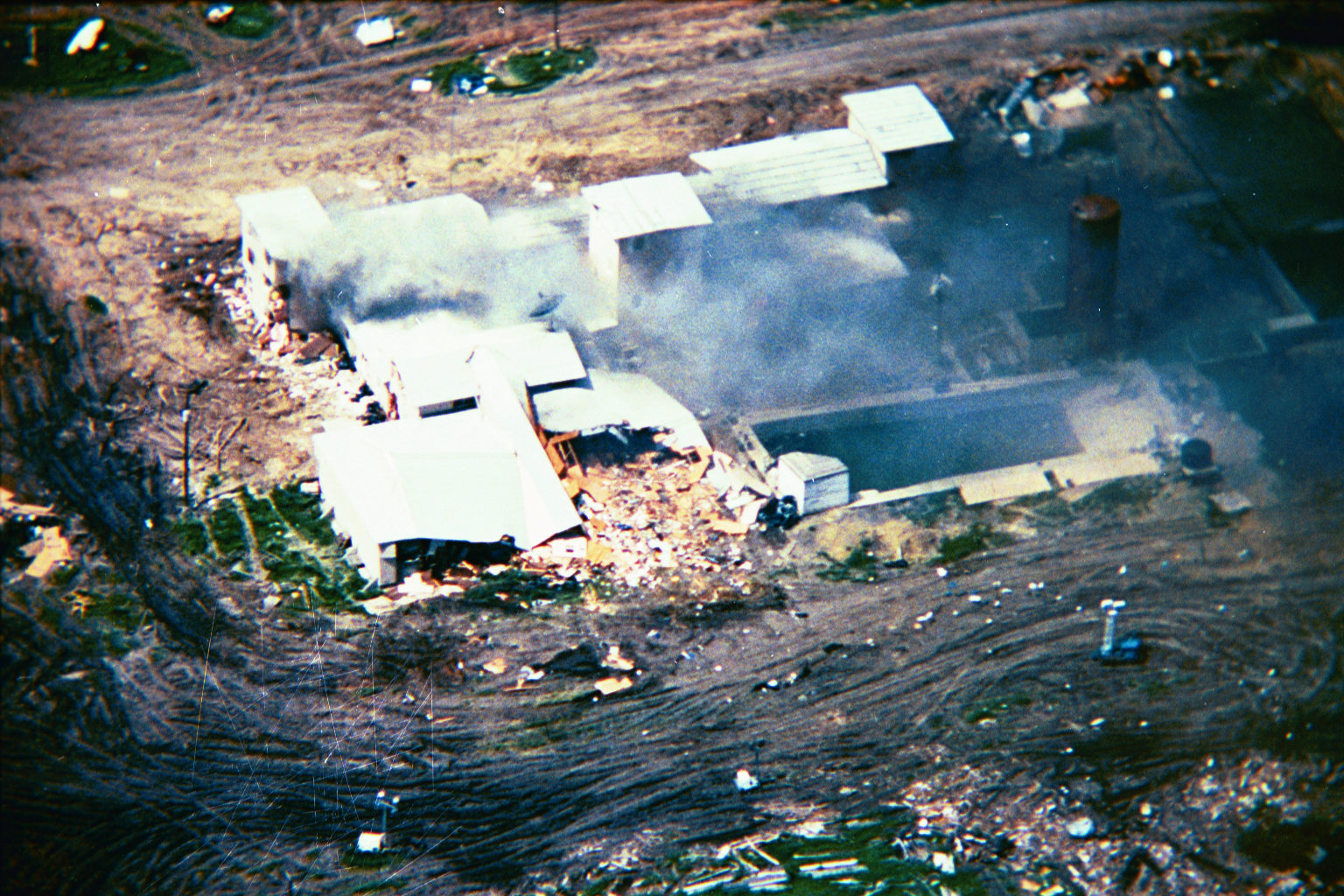
Mount Carmel Center in flames during the Waco assault on April 19, 1993

After regrouping, a siege was initiated by the Federal Bureau of Investigation, resulting in a virtual 50-day standoff. A second assault on the compound was made by the US government on April 19, 1993, during which there were numerous explosions throughout the compound. As the fire spread, some Davidians were prevented from escaping, with others refusing to leave, becoming trapped. Only nine people were able to safely leave the building during the fire.

A week after the end of the siege, Owsley was contacted by special agent Joseph DiZinno from the Forensic Science Research and Training Center at the FBI Academy in Quantico. On behalf of Danny Greathouse, chief of the FBI's Disaster Unit, who was overseeing the situation at Waco, DiZinno requested Owsley's and Douglas H. Ubelaker's assistance in identifying the victims from inside the Branch Davidian compound.

Overall, the remains of the victims in the compound were badly burned beyond recognition. In addition to being burned, many bodies were blown apart, leaving charred flesh and bone fragments scattered throughout the remnants of the property. The forensic team found it difficult to assess the full impact of the tragedy due to continuing intense heat and the collapse of the building. They lacked information on the number of bodies previously buried in and around the compound, prior to the siege. They were also unaware that there were individuals being held in the underground bunker, which had been used to store compound supplies, including food, weapons, and ammunition.

Texas Rangers and FBI field agents began gathering remains in body bags and shipping them to the medical examiner's office over a hundred miles away in Fort Worth. The medical examiner quickly determined that the remains were so intermingled that before the victims could be identified or be prepared for autopsies, the remains would need to be pieced back together. On April 27, Owsley arrived at the Tarrant County Medical Examiner's Office to lend his support.

Most of the bodies could not be identified by fingerprints, X-rays, or photographs, requiring Owsley and Ubelaker to begin a systematic process of sorting through body parts in an attempt to reconstruct the remains. In order to identify the victims for their families, they needed to determine the age, sex, race, and height of each piece of human remains, as well as the cause of death. The primary focus of this task was completed on May 3, 1993.

The victims at the Branch Davidian compound, including the children, were either buried alive by rubble, suffocated by the effects of the fire, or shot by gunfire. Those who suffocated during the siege were killed by smoke or carbon monoxide poisoning, as fire engulfed the compound. The estimated number of victims continued to increase during the course of analysis. Anthropological examination took place on 83 individuals, with 41 resulting in positive identification through comparison with their known medical records. By October 1994, the number of positive identifications increased to 82. In some cases, "individual" analysis consisted of uniting isolated skeletal or bodily remains with other body parts of the same individual. Out of all the remains recovered, only four bodies were found in sufficient condition to allow standard medical autopsies.

It took several days for the forensic team to identify the remains of the Branch Davidian leader, David Koresh, leading to rumors that he had been seen escaping the compound prior to the inferno that took the lives of church members. Once his remains were found, Owsley determined through forensic evidence that rather than dying as a result of the fire, as was widely believed, Koresh had actually been shot in the forehead, killed by one of his lieutenants. When the smoke cleared, 88 people were dead. Four ATF agents and five church members died before fire engulfed the compound. Following the fire and collapse of the buildings, the dead included over 20 children, along with two pregnant women, and Koresh.

==== 17th-century Jamestown Colony excavations ====
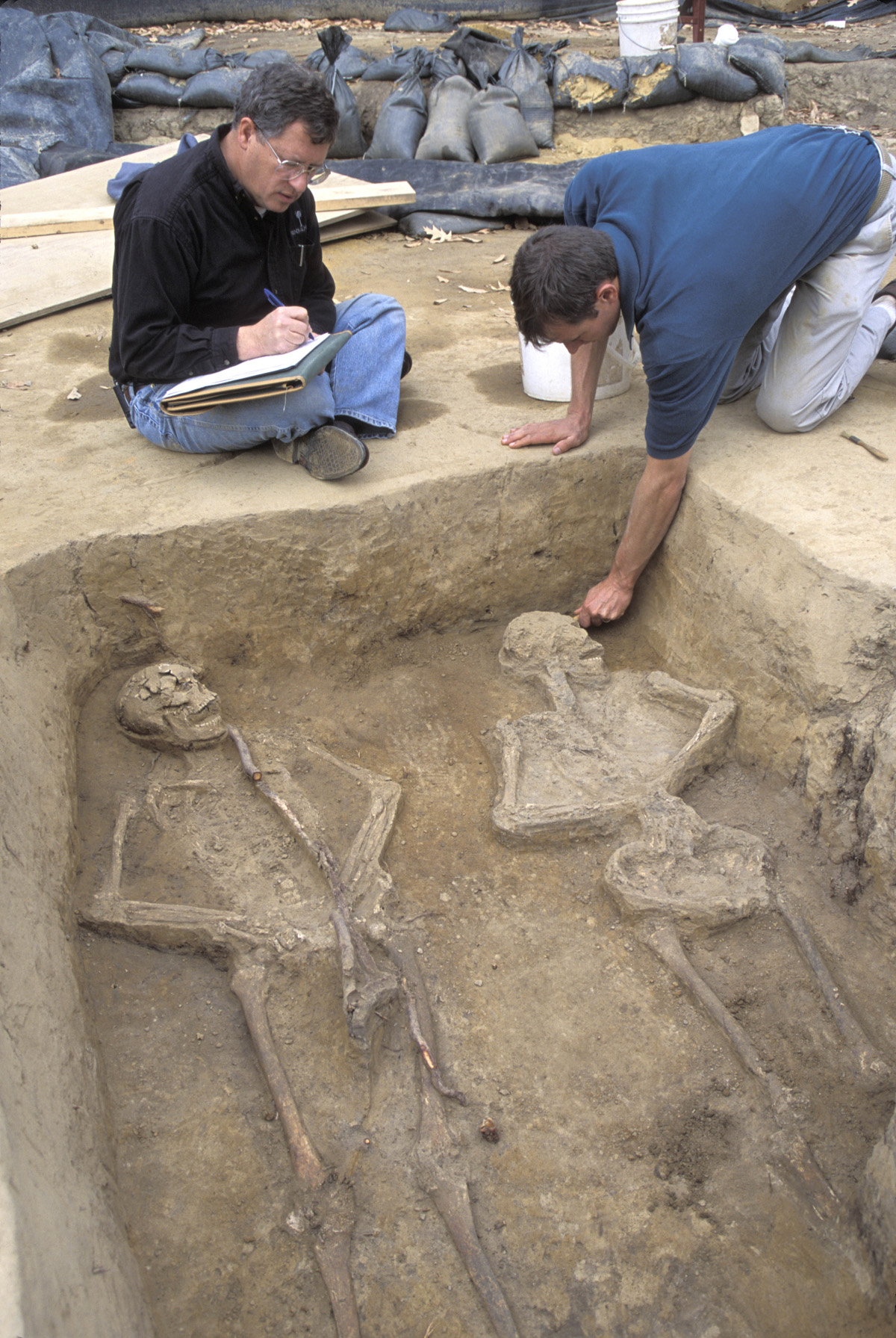
Owsley (left) and Historic Jamestowne archaeologist, Danny Schmidt, discussing the double burial of two European males at the James Fort site

In 1994, Preservation Virginia, a historical conservation organization that owns over 22 acres alongside the edge of Jamestown, Virginia, hired William Kelso to conduct archaeological digs on the site of Historic Jamestowne. The primary goal of the project was to locate remains of "the first years of settlement at Jamestown, especially of the earliest fortified town; [and the] subsequent growth and development of the town".

In 1996, the team discovered the remains and early colonial artifacts of the original 1607 settlement. While the archaeological project was successful, the results came as a surprise to historians, since it had long been thought that the original site had disappeared due to erosion along the island's western shore of the James River. While most professional historians and archaeologists believed that James Fort was lost below the water's surface, others thought that at least portions of the fort site remained. The excavations performed during the project revealed that only one corner of the fort had been destroyed. In 1900, a sea wall that was built to hinder erosion on the banks of the river served to preserve a tangible piece of history for future generations.

When the original fort was discovered, Kelso invited Owsley to assist in the excavation and identification of skeletal remains recovered from the burial site, constructed after London's Virginia Company settled in Jamestown in 1607. Owsley worked with David Riggs, curator of the Jamestown Museum, to research the demography and health of 17th-century colonists. Their work included sorting out the human remains and separating English colonists from Native Americans, in order to comply with consultation and repatriation under the Native American Graves Protection and Repatriation Act (NAGPRA).

During scientific analysis, Owsley studied skeletons excavated from graveyards in the 1940s and 1955, as well as individual remains unearthed in locations other than the known cemeteries. All of the remains had remained curated in the museum for several decades. In the 1950s, five skeletons were discovered at Jamestown Colony and identified as Native American. Advanced forensic analysis performed following the discovery of the original fort reclassified the remains as African. Supporting the results of the scientific study, a comparative analysis of historical documents, including ship logs and correspondence between the early colonists confirmed that the first Africans arrived in 1619, aboard a ship that arrived from Holland. The research completed by Owsley documented the earliest known Africans in the British North American colonies to date.

In 2013, Owsley participated in the introduction of "Jane", the reconstructed remains of a 14-year-old resident of the colony whose skeleton bore signs of her having been eaten by other humans. The search for archaeological evidence had been prompted by surviving contemporary documentary accounts of cannibalism during the colony's "starving time" winter of 1609–1610.

In July 2015, the remains of four principals of the colony were excavated and identified by the Rediscovery/Smithsonian team, including Owsley. The four colonists were identified as Rev. Robert Hunt, Capt. Gabriel Archer, Sir Ferdinando Wainman and Capt. William West.

==== Kennewick Man ====
Owsley's forensic work and scientific studies have included the research and analysis of ancient skeletal remains throughout North America. His most prominent and controversial case has been the study of a prehistoric Paleo-Indian man, known as "Kennewick Man" or the "Ancient One." The discovery of the skeleton itself was notable for being in good condition while dating back to a calibrated age of 9,800 years.

On July 28, 1996, two men found the skeletal remains while walking alongside the bank of the Columbia River during the annual Tri-City Water Follies. The popular sporting event is attended by several thousand hydroplane boat race fans every July. Upon the initial discovery of the remains, the Benton County Coroner, Floyd Johnson, contacted local forensic anthropologist, James Chatters, who had owned and operated a small consulting business, Applied Paleoscience, out of a laboratory established in the basement of his home. With over 40 years' professional background in forensics and anthropology, he had worked with local law enforcement officials with assessing crime scenes and determining whether any discovered human remains were forensic or archaeological.

Chatters' assessment concluded that the remains displayed "Caucasoid features," which describes a long, narrow skull. This was later misreported to the media as the skeletal remains having "Caucasian" or European ancestry. It was during the analysis performed by Chatters, that his wife, Jenny Chatters, visited the lab and asked her husband, "So, how's 'Kennewick Man?'" using the common moniker for the first time. Soon after the discovery, several Northwest tribes, including the Umatilla, Colville, Yakama, and Nez Perce claimed him as an ancestor, requesting the return of the remains for reburial based on the rights afforded to them under NAGPRA. Chatters said that he had approximately two weeks at the most to conclude his study of Kennewick Man, and that much more time would be needed to make a full and accurate assessment of the remains, before they could be handed over to the Native American tribes for burial. Seeking advice from his colleagues due to his belief that the remains were caucasian, Chatters was counseled to contact Owsley at the Smithsonian.

During their initial conversation, Owsley agreed to assist Chatters and encouraged him to contact attorney, Robson Bonnichsen, who was a legal expert on NAGPRA law and related issues. Following the archaeological discovery, the forensic study of Kennewick Man became the focus of a controversial nine-year court case between the US Army Corps of Engineers, a group of scientists including Owsley, and Native American tribes who all claimed ownership of the remains. These scientists had initially determined that the skeletal features had little in common with those of modern Native American populations.

Under NAGPRA, the tribes maintained the right to rebury the remains of Kennewick Man and to refuse further scientific study of the man they refer to as "the Ancient One". The US Army Corps of Engineers, who owned the land where the remains were found, agreed to comply with the requests of the tribes. Before the transfer could be made, Owsley, along with seven other anthropologists, including Smithsonian colleague Dennis Stanford, filed a lawsuit claiming the right to study the skeleton. They argued that the reburial of Kennewick Man before they could study him unjustly imposed the beliefs of the Native Americans upon them. In Fall of 1996, the US government and the Native American tribes argued that it was illegal for Owsley as an employee of one branch of government to sue another branch of government. Owsley's participation in the lawsuit, and pursuit of remedy against the federal government, placed him in direct opposition to his employer. After receipt of the notice of this by the US Department of Justice, Owsley refused to remove his name from the lawsuit. As the lawsuit progressed through the courts, the Smithsonian Institution supported the Owsley and his colleagues in their pursuit of scientific study and research of Kennewick Man.

In 2002, a federal court in the state of Oregon ruled that the tribes failed to establish continuous and definitive cultural links between themselves and the remains. This ruling opened up the way for Owsley and his team of scientists to study the skeleton. Following an appeal in February 2004, a panel of the United States Court of Appeals for the Ninth Circuit upheld the decision. The ruling additionally set a precedent, ensuring that any future discovery of ancient remains could also be made available for scientific studies. The presiding judge found that the Corps of Engineers on multiple occasions had misled or deceived the court, and the US government had acted in bad faith. The appeals court awarded attorney's fees of $2,379,000 to the plaintiffs.

In July 2005, Owsley, along with a team of scientists from around the United States gathered in Seattle for ten days to study the remains, making detailed measurements and determining the cause of death. Much in the same way that Ötzi the Iceman of South Tyrol, Italy, the analytical study of Kennewick Man yielded valuable scientific data. The scientific study and analytical data appeared to contradict the notion that Indigenous peoples were the first peoples of the Americas, suggesting that a man with Caucasoid features lived in the New World nearly 10,000 years ago. These results, which were later disproved, were widely reported by the press on a global scale. As of 2012, Kennewick Man was housed at the Burke Museum of Natural History and Culture at the University of Washington.

In June 2015, scientists at the University of Copenhagen in Denmark determined through DNA from 9,500-year-old bones that Kennewick Man is in fact more closely related to contemporary Native Americans, including those near where he was found, than any other human population. The international team of scientists had confirmed this finding to the Army Corps of Engineers as far back as 2013. Chatters, the first one to analyse of the bones, had long changed his mind after finding similar skull shapes among confirmed ancestors of Native Americans. The results did not surprise the local Native American tribes or most scientists who study the genetics of ancient people, as almost all Paleoamericans "have shown strong genetic ties with modern Native Americans". Analysis showed that Kennewick Man is "very closely related to the Colville" tribe in northeast Washington, one of the original claimants under NAGPRA. The results were published in Nature magazine.

The same year, two bills were introduced, both titled Bring the Ancient One Home Act, to repatriate Kennewick Man's remains to the tribes who claimed him in spite of the court's 2004 ruling. This led to the passing of a bill on 16 December 2016 as Section 1152 of the Water Infrastructure Improvement for the Nation Act. On 28 February 2017, only 63 days after the bill was passed, the tribes reburied Kennewick Man in an undisclosed burial in Washington.

==== H. L. Hunley discovery ====
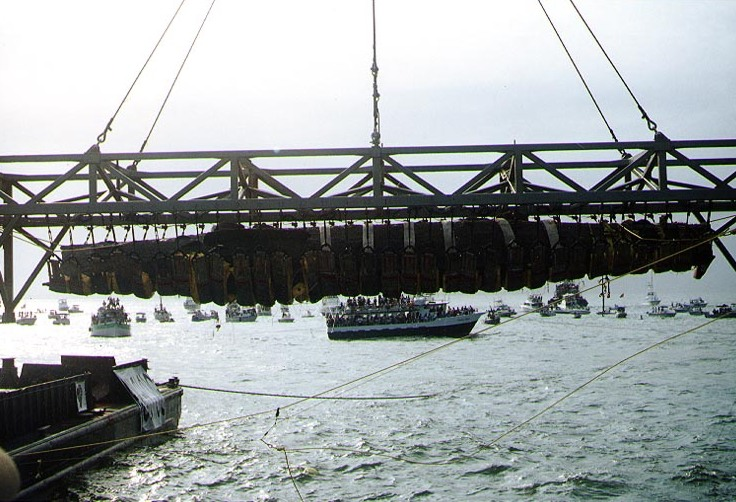
H. L. Hunley, suspended from a crane during its recovery from Charleston Harbor, August 8, 2000

On February 17, 1864, the USS Housatonic was struck by a torpedo launched from the H. L. Hunley Confederate submarine in Charleston Harbor. While this was the first combat submarine to sink an enemy warship, the vessel failed to return to port following the attack. Its fate remained a mystery for over 130 years.

In April 1995, the wreck of the H. L. Hunley, along with the skeletal remains of eight crew members was discovered by diver Ralph Wilbanks, while overseeing a NUMA dive team led by marine archaeologist Clive Cussler. Five years later, the submarine was recovered from the Charleston Harbor and transferred to the Warren Lasch Conservation Center at the former Charleston Navy Yard. The wreck was placed in a 55,000-gallon tank filled with fresh water and treated with an electric current to minimize corrosion, beginning the process of desalination. Owsley and Richard Jantz of the University of Tennessee were called to lead the forensic investigation. At this time, the tank and submarine were raised to drydock and periodically drained in preparation for research and analysis.

The anthropology team established an excavation plan that would take place in four stages. The first phase involved laser scanning technology, which would determine the safest manner of access, making sure that the wreck would be protected from damage, along with any artifacts she may have held. The second phase included an examination of a hole in the starboard side of the tank, which provided access for preliminary excavation of the stern. The third phase involved removing a series of iron plates from over the vessel's hull. This process would allow access to begin phase four, which consisted of using hand tools and sifters to screen sediment and identify any possible artifacts.

On March 20, 2001, the first human remains were discovered in the sediment. Owsley confirmed the identification of three ribs from the right side of a man's body. When he viewed the submarine tomb of the Confederate soldiers, instead of merely seeing scattered skeletal remains and sediment, he solemnly visualized the men at their stations as the vessel began to slowly fill with water. He imagined their lives turn to panic as the water crept in, quickly resulting in death. In the final stage of advanced decomposition, bones crumbled to the metal iron floor of submarine to rest in the blue-gray clay-like sediment, which served to preserve the remains for over 137 years. With the ethical and humanitarian respect that had long guided his career, Owsley began assessing and excavating the interior and skeletal remains of the soldiers who served on the Hunley.

On January 25, 2002, the focus of the work shifted from recovery and excavation to the study and identification of the human remains. Once all the bones were removed from the submarine, Owsley and Jantz returned to Charleston to begin reconstructing the remains. They compiled forensic and skeletal data and existing archaeological records with historical and genealogical information available for each crewmember. The skulls of the soldiers were very well preserved, allowing Owsley to reconstruct facial features, revealing what each crew member may have looked like. The primary goal was to distinguish and identify the crew members and their remains in order to provide a proper burial.

The forensic analysis of the human remains determined that four men were American, while the others were from Europe. The assessment and determining factors were based on chemical markings left on the teeth and bones, due to the predominant cultural components of their diet. Four of the men had eaten large quantities of maize (or corn), which is considered a staple of the American diet, while the other men primarily ate grains, including wheat and rye, both of which are staples of a European diet. Through careful examination of American Civil War records in comparison with DNA studies performed with the cooperation of possible relatives, forensic genealogist Linda Abrams was able to identify the remains of Lt. Dixon and three other Americans, including Frank G. Collins of Fredericksburg, Virginia; Joseph Ridgaway; and James A. Wicks.

After 140 years to the day, on April 17, 2004, the remains of the Hunley crew were laid to rest at Magnolia Cemetery in Charleston, South Carolina. Several thousand people participated in a funeral procession, including approximately 6,000 American Civil War reenactors, 4,000 civilians wearing period clothing, and color guards from all five branches of the U.S. armed forces. Even though only two of the crew were from the Confederate States, all were buried with full Confederate honors, including burial with the Confederate national flag.

==== 9/11 Pentagon victims ====
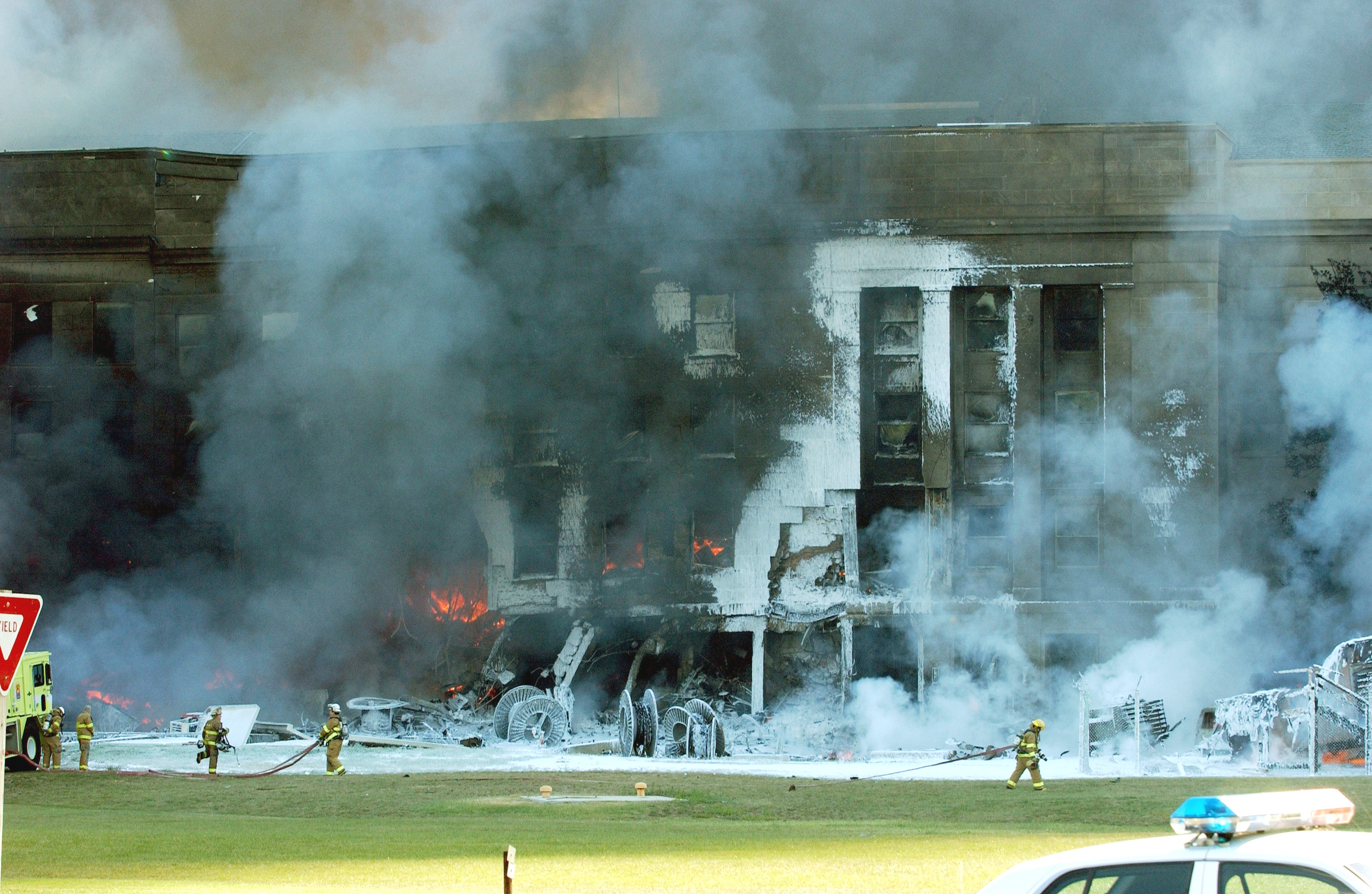
Pentagon on 9/11, minutes after the crash of American Airlines Flight 77

On September 11, 2001, Owsley was sitting at his desk in his rural Jeffersonton, Virginia farmhouse, when he received a call from colleagues at the Smithsonian, telling him to turn on his television. The news report revealed that the Pentagon in Arlington, Virginia, was engulfed in flames, explaining that terrorists had flown a jetliner into the building, killing untold numbers of government workers and military officials.

Owsley's initial concerns following the attack were for his daughter, Hilary, who had recently started working as a budget analyst with the US Navy. Her office was located in the C Ring at the Pentagon, at the site of the impact. While her office was destroyed in the fire, Hilary and her colleagues had fortunately escaped serious harm, exiting the building just prior to the collapse of the ceiling. It was later learned that Hilary's supervisor pulled to a corner and kept her from danger by standing between her and the oncoming fire and debris. They both walked away unharmed.

On September 14, 2001, Owsley and Ubelaker were called in by DiZinno to assist in the identification and analysis of the bodies that were recovered from the Pentagon. The human remains were transferred to the oversight of the Armed Forces Medical Examiner's Office, who established a mortuary at Dover Air Force Base. Owsley arrived at the base on the following day to join a team of radiologists, dentists, and medical examiners gathered to identify victims, primarily through the use of DNA typing. After arriving onsite, he was held to a confidentiality agreement, known as the "Dover Code", which essentially translated to "What you see here stays here."

Overall, much of his work at Dover was comparable to his work at Waco. Owsley spent time sifting through and sorting remains, bone fragments, and mixed up and jumbled flesh particles for DNA studies to establish the identity and cause of death of each victim. Starting September 15, he continued to work 12-hour days to identify 60 victims of the attack. The forensic analysis was able to successfully identify and establish the cause of death for 60 of the overall 184 victims that were identified. When he was finished, he wrote down his thoughts about the experience, sharing his emotion and heartache, along with an overwhelming sense of gratitude that his daughter was not among the victims of the attack on the Pentagon. He then gave the document to his daughter, Hilary. On May 30, 2002, the US Department of Defense and Armed Forces Institute of Pathology honored both Owsley and Ubelaker with the Commander's Award for Civilian Service in recognition of his work identifying 60 victims of the attack on the Pentagon.

==== 19th-century Washington D.C. iron coffin excavations ====
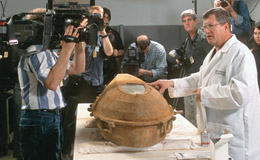
Press conference with Dr. Owsley following the discovery of the cast-iron coffins in Washington, D.C.

In April 2005, public utility workers working on a construction project discovered a buried Fisk metallic burial case, or coffin, at an apartment complex in the Columbia Heights neighborhood of Washington, D.C. The coffin was shaped a bit like an Egyptian mummy case, with a glass plate on the front above the face, which was designed to allow viewing of the body without the risk of exposure to odor or possible disease.

Cast iron coffins were popular in the mid-1800s among wealthier families. They were highly desirable by more affluent individuals and families for their ability to deter grave robbers. The airtight coffins are sealed, which greatly preserves the bodies. Years later, the remains look like ancient mummies, even though they do not go through Egyptian embalming procedures. This type of burial in the 19th century, clearly indicated that the individual buried was someone of cultural importance.

After the discovery of the coffins, Owsley was asked to provide analysis and eventual identification of the remains, so that proper burial could take place. He gathered a team of physical anthropologists, clothing specialists, pathologists, DNA scientists, and historical archaeologists. Through forensic and genealogical analysis, it was determined that one of the remains was that of 15-year-old William Taylor White, who died in 1852 and was buried in the Columbia College cemetery. The researchers believe that his coffin was overlooked when the cemetery was relocated in April 1866.

An obituary published in the Daily National Intelligencer newspaper of Washington on January 28, 1852, confirmed that White died on January 24, 1852, after a short illness. Clothing historians determined that he was dressed in a shirt, vest, and pants, consistent with clothing styles of the early to mid–1850s. White's relatives raised a headstone for the deceased at a cemetery in Modest Town, Virginia, and donated his remains, clothing, and coffin to the Department of Anthropology at the National Museum of Natural History.

== Honors and awards ==
- 2002: Department of the Army Commander's Award for Civilian Service
- 2011: Virginia Museum of Natural History – Jefferson Award

== Television appearances ==
- 1997: "St Mary's City, Maryland, US" Time Team Digs (BBC) as himself – Osteoarchaeologist
- 2003: "The Mystery of Easter Island" Horizon (BBC) as himself
- 2005: "Nightmare in Jamestown" National Geographic Explorer documentary as himself – Forensic Anthropologist
- 2007: "Jamestown: America's Birthplace" Time Team Digs (BBC) as himself – Smithsonian Institution

== Published books ==
- Owsley, Douglas W.; Hofman, Jack L.; Brooks, Robert L.; Jantz, Richard L.; Marks, Murray K.; and Manhein, Mary H. (1989). From Clovis to Comanchero: Archeological Overview of the Southern Great Plains, Arkansas Archeological Survey. ISBN 978-1-56349-063-7
- Owsley, Douglas W.; Jantz, Richard L. (1994). Skeletal Biology in the Great Plains: Migration, Welfare, Health, and Subsistence, Washington D.C.: Smithsonian Institution Press. ISBN 978-1-56098-093-3
- Owsley, Douglas W.; Rose, Jerome Carl; and the United States Department of Defense Legacy Resources Management Program (1997). Bioarchaeology of the North Central United States: A Volume in the Central and Northern Plains Archeological Overview, Fayetteville, Arkansas: Arkansas Archeological Survey. ISBN 978-1-56349-080-4
- Owsley, Douglas W.; and Bruwelheide, Karin (2009). Written in Bone: Bone Biographer's Casebook, Leanto Press. ISBN 978-0-615-23346-8
- Owsley, Douglas W.; Jodry, Margaret A.; Stafford, Thomas W. Jr.; Haynes, C. Vance Jr.; and Stanford, Dennis J. (2010). Arch Lake Woman: Physical Anthropology and Geoarcheology, Peopling of the Americas Publication Series, Texas A&M University Press. ISBN 978-1-60344-208-4
- Owsley, Douglas W.; and Walker, Sally M. (2012). Their Skeletons Speak, Carolrhoda Books. ISBN 978-0-7613-7457-2
