= Kari Bruwelheide =

American anthropologist

- Born: March 16, 1967; Lincoln County, Minnesota
- Citizenship: American
- Education: Luther College; University of Nebraska–Lincoln's College of Arts and Sciences
- Known for: Written in Bone: Forensic Files of the 17th-Century Chesapeake
- Scientific career
- Fields: Bioarchaeology, Physical Anthropology, Forensic Anthropology
- Workplaces: Smithsonian Institution's; National Museum of Natural History
- Academic advisors: Karl J. Reinhard

Kari Bruwelheide (born March 16, 1967) is an American archaeologist and anthropologist. She is known for her work as a physical anthropologist, bioarchaeologist, and forensic anthropologist at the Smithsonian Institution's National Museum of Natural History.

Since joining the Smithsonian in 1992, she has assisted Douglas W. Owsley, Division Head of Physical Anthropology, identify skeletal remains and determine the cause of death in various high-profile forensic cases. These cases have included studying the remains of three individuals discovered buried in the Chesapeake Bay area of St. Mary's City, Maryland, during a remote sensing survey at the foundation of the 17th-century Brick Chapel Catholic Church; examining and identifying the remains of victims of the siege on the Branch Davidian compound in Waco, Texas; examining the remains excavated in the historic Jamestown Colony; and assisting in the identification of American Civil War soldiers who perished aboard the H. L. Hunley Confederate submarine.

She is co-curator, along with Owsley, of the exhibition Written in Bone: Forensic Files of the 17th-Century Chesapeake. In 2010, Bruwelheide, Owsley, and the Museum's staff of the Department of Exhibits were honored with the Smithsonian Secretary's Distinguished Research Prize, recognizing the success of the Written In Bone exhibit, which was open from February 2009 to January 2014.

== Personal life ==
Karin Lynn "Kari" (née Sandness) Bruwelheide was born on March 16, 1967, in Lincoln County, Minnesota and raised in Saint Paul. She is the daughter of Marvin E. and Rebecca K. (née Bremseth) Sandness. She has two older brothers, Mark and Stephan.

Bruwelheide graduated from Como Park Senior High School in 1985. She attended Luther College in Decorah, Iowa, graduating in 1989, with a Bachelor's degree, double majoring in English and Anthropology. In 1992, she earned a Master of Arts degree in Physical Anthropology from the University of Nebraska's College of Arts and Sciences in Lincoln.

She is married to Kurt Bruwelheide and they have two children.

== Professional life ==
In 1992, following completion of her master's degree, Bruwelheide joined the staff at the Smithsonian's National Museum of Natural History. Her work has focused on the forensic examination of modern and historic remains including skeletal studies of 17th and 18th-century American colonists, iron coffin burials, and Civil War military remains. She has assisted Doug Owsley with high-profile forensic cases, and her research is currently focused on human skeletal remains found in the Chesapeake region of Virginia and Maryland from the early colonial period.

=== 17th-century Chesapeake Bay lead coffin excavations ===
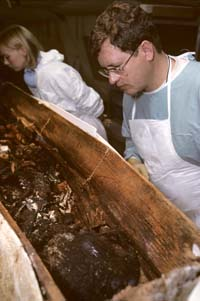
Smithsonian forensic anthropologists Douglas Owsley and Kari Bruwelheide examine the burial and remains of Anne Wolseley Calvert

In 1990, three lead coffins were discovered buried in the Chesapeake Bay area of St. Mary's City, Maryland, during a remote sensing survey at the foundation of the 17th-century Brick Chapel Catholic Church, on land that had been used as a cornfield for centuries. Owsley was asked to assist in the identification of the remains.

The bodies were believed to be Phillip Calvert, fifth Governor of Maryland, his wife, and his infant daughter by his second wife, Jane Sewell. Following forensic examination, Owsley confirmed the identification of Anne Wolsely Calvert. As the wife of the governor, she was a woman of high social standing in historic St. Mary's City, making her home in a large, red brick mansion known as "St. Peters". In 1678, her home was the largest colonial mansion in English America. She would have owned the highest quality and most desired material possessions available in the colony. Her teeth were in very poor shape, indicating that she had access to sugar, which was only available in low quantities and highly prohibitive to others due to the financial cost. Her consumption of sweeteners had a destructive effect on her teeth.

On November 9, 1992, Owsley began his study of the remains, which eventually revealed that Calvert lived with an acute fracture of one of her thighbones, which shortened the length of her leg. The best the local doctors could do for her was to recommend bed rest so that the bone would have a greater chance to heal properly. The analysis also showed that an infection had developed at the fracture, which would have caused chronic pain throughout her life.

Attempting to identify the male remains found in the lead coffin was a bit more difficult. Burial in lead coffins reflected prominence in the Roman Catholic Church. At the time of death, the man had been in his early 50s. The study showed that he was right handed and stood about five and a half feet tall, with muscle attachments that suggested that he lived a lifestyle other than farming or manual labor. A lack of pollen in the coffin indicated that he died during the winter. There were several clues in place, based on cultural aspects of the time, which included societal status, wealth, and religion. All of these clues established that the individual fell within these characteristic traits, which assisted in an accurate identification of the remains.

Historical data indicated that the death occurred after 1667, when the Brick Chapel was built, and prior to 1705, when the doors of the church were locked by legal decree of the Royal Governor. For practical reasons, the individual also had to live close enough to the church to have been buried there. Through a process of elimination, Owsley, along with professional historians determined that the coffin held the remains of Philip Calvert, youngest son of George Calvert, 1st Baron Baltimore.

=== Waco Branch Davidian compound victims ===
On February 28, 1993, outside of Waco, Texas, violence erupted during an attempt by the United States Bureau of Alcohol, Tobacco and Firearms (ATF) to execute a search warrant on a Protestant group of religious adherents disfellowshipped from the Seventh-day Adventist Church. Allegations were made against the Branch Davidians that they were stockpiling illegal weapons at their headquarters at Mount Carmel. Shortly after officials approached the compound, gunfire erupted, which lasted nearly two hours. After the initial exchange of gunfire was over, four agents and six Branch Davidians were dead.

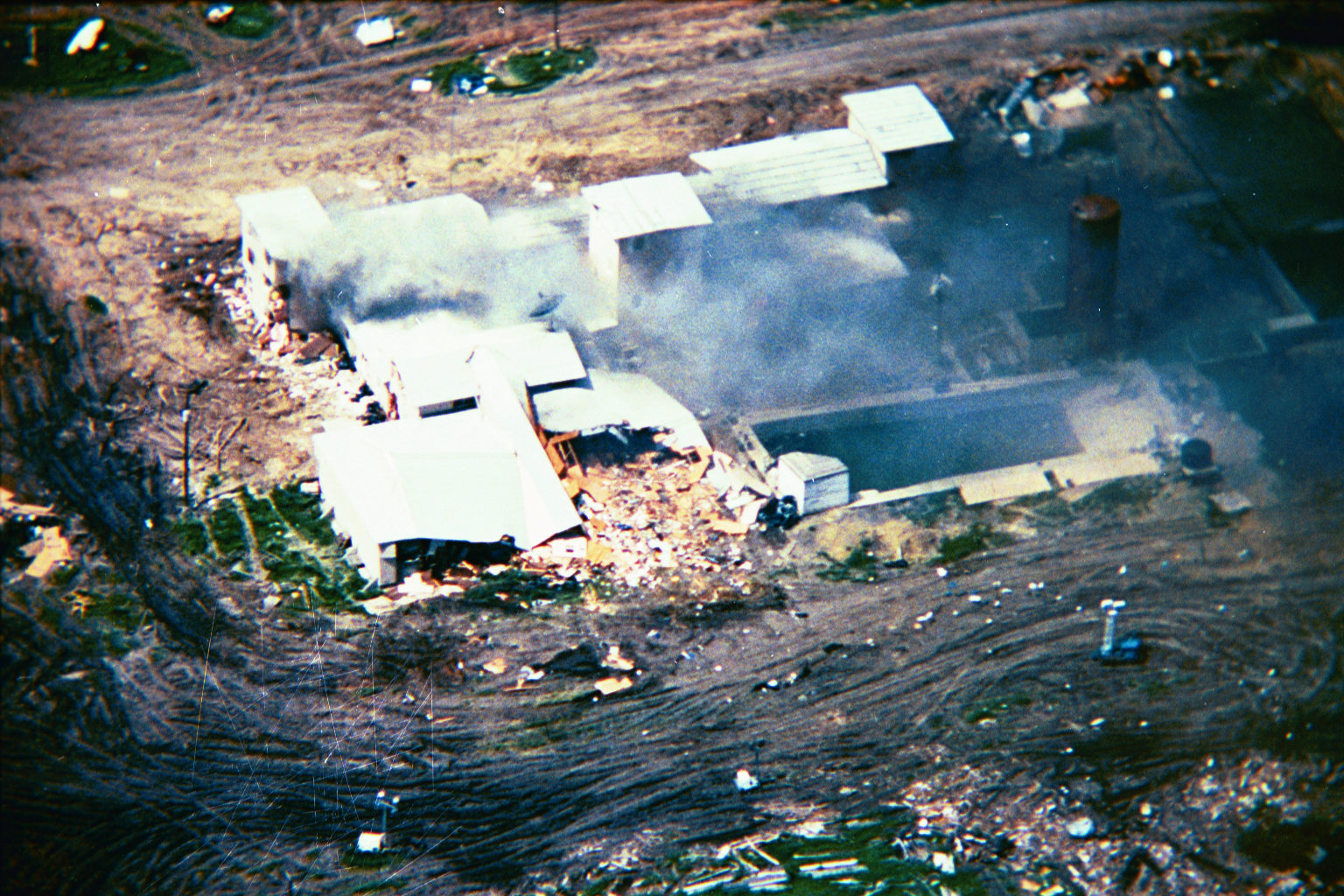
Mount Carmel Center in flames during the Waco assault on April 19, 1993

After regrouping, a siege was initiated by the Federal Bureau of Investigation, resulting in a virtual 50-day standoff. A second assault on the compound was made by the US government on April 19, 1993, during which there were numerous explosions throughout the compound. As the fire spread, some Davidians were prevented from escaping, with others refusing to leave, becoming trapped. Only nine people were able to safely leave the building during the fire.

A week after the end of the siege, Owsley was contacted by special agent Joseph DiZinno from the Forensic Science Research and Training Center at the FBI Academy in Quantico. On behalf of Danny Greathouse, chief of the FBI's Disaster Unit, who was overseeing the situation at Waco, DiZinno requested Owsley's and Douglas H. Ubelaker's assistance in identifying the victims from inside the Branch Davidian compound.

Overall, the remains of the victims in the compound were badly burned beyond recognition. In addition to being burned, many bodies were blown apart, leaving charred flesh and bone fragments scattered throughout the remnants of the property. The forensic team found it difficult to assess the full impact of the tragedy due to continuing intense heat and the collapse of the building. They lacked information on the number of bodies previously buried in and around the compound, prior to the siege. They were also unaware that there were individuals being held in the underground bunker, which had been used to store compound supplies, including food, weapons, and ammunition.

Texas Rangers and FBI field agents began gathering remains in body bags and shipping them to the medical examiner's office over a hundred miles away in Fort Worth. The medical examiner quickly determined that the remains were so intermingled that before the victims could be identified or be prepared for autopsies, the remains would need to be pieced back together. On April 27, Owsley arrived at the Tarrant County Medical Examiner's Office to lend his support.

Most of the bodies could not be identified by fingerprints, X-rays, or photographs, requiring Owsley and Ubelaker to begin a systematic process of sorting through body parts in an attempt to reconstruct the remains. In order to identify the victims for their families, they needed to determine the age, sex, race, and height of each piece of human remains, as well as the cause of death. The primary focus of this task was completed on May 3, 1993.

The victims at the Branch Davidian compound, including the children, were either buried alive by rubble, suffocated by the effects of the fire, or shot by gunfire. Those who suffocated during the siege were killed by smoke or carbon monoxide poisoning, as fire engulfed the compound. The estimated number of victims continued to increase during the course of analysis. Anthropological examination took place on 83 individuals, with 41 resulting in positive identification through comparison with their known medical records. By October 1994, the number of positive identifications increased to 82. In some cases, "individual" analysis consisted of uniting isolated skeletal or bodily remains with other body parts of the same individual. Out of all the remains recovered, only four bodies were found in sufficient condition to allow standard medical autopsies.

It took several days for the forensic team to identify the remains of the Branch Davidian leader, David Koresh, leading to rumors that he had been seen escaping the compound prior to the inferno that took the lives of church members. Once his remains were found, Owsley determined through forensic evidence that rather than dying as a result of the fire, as was widely believed, Koresh had actually been shot in the forehead, killed by one of his lieutenants. When the smoke cleared, 88 people were dead. Four ATF agents and five church members died before fire engulfed the compound. Following the fire and collapse of the buildings, the dead included over 20 children, along with two pregnant women, and Koresh.

=== 17th-century Jamestown Colony excavations ===
In 1994, Preservation Virginia, a historical conservation organization that owns over 22 acres alongside the edge of Jamestown, Virginia, hired William Kelso to conduct archeological digs on the site of Historic Jamestowne. The primary goal of the project was to locate remains of "the first years of settlement at Jamestown, especially of the earliest fortified town; [and the] subsequent growth and development of the town".

In 1996, the team discovered the remains and early colonial artifacts of the original 1607 settlement. While the archeological project was successful, the results came as a surprise to historians, since it had long been thought that the original site had disappeared due to erosion along the island's western shore of the James River. While most professional historians and archeologists believed that James Fort was lost below the water's surface, others thought that at least portions of the fort site remained. The excavations performed during the project revealed that only one corner of the fort had been destroyed. In 1900, a sea wall that was built to hinder erosion on the banks of the river served to preserve a tangible piece of history for future generations.

When the original fort was discovered, Kelso invited Owsley to assist in the excavation and identification of skeletal remains recovered from the burial site, constructed after London's Virginia Company settled in Jamestown in 1607. Owsley worked with David Riggs, curator of the Jamestown Museum, to research the demography and health of 17th-century colonists. Their work included sorting out the human remains and separating English colonists from Native Americans, in order to comply with repatriation, required through the passage of the Native American Graves Protection and Repatriation Act (NAGPRA).

During scientific analysis, Owsley studied skeletons excavated from graveyards in the 1940s and 1955, as well as individual remains unearthed in locations other than the known cemeteries. All of the remains had remained curated in the museum for several decades. In the 1950s, five skeletons were discovered at Jamestown Colony and identified as Native American. Advanced forensic analysis performed following the discovery of the original fort reclassified the remains as African. Supporting the results of the scientific study, a comparative analysis of historical documents, including ship logs and correspondence between the early colonists confirmed that the first Africans arrived in 1619, aboard a ship that arrived from Holland. The research completed by Owsley documented the earliest known Africans in the British North American colonies to date.

=== H. L. Hunley discovery ===
On February 17, 1864, the USS Housatonic was struck by a torpedo launched from the H. L. Hunley Confederate submarine in Charleston Harbor. While this was the first combat submarine to sink an enemy warship, the vessel failed to return to port following the attack. Its fate remained a mystery for over 130 years.

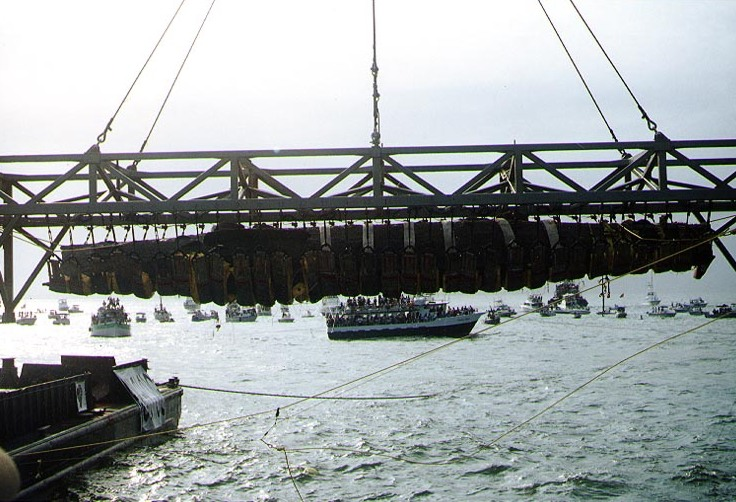
H. L. Hunley, suspended from a crane during its recovery from Charleston Harbor, August 8, 2000

In April 1995, the wreck of the H. L. Hunley, along with the skeletal remains of eight crew members was discovered by diver Ralph Wilbanks, while overseeing a NUMA dive team led by marine archeologist Clive Cussler. Five years later, the submarine was recovered from the Charleston Harbor and transferred to the Warren Lasch Conservation Center at the former Charleston Navy Yard. The wreck was placed in a 55,000-gallon tank filled with fresh water and treated with an electric current to minimize corrosion, beginning the process of desalination. Owsley and Richard Jantz of the University of Tennessee were called to lead the forensic investigation. At this time, the tank and submarine were raised to drydock and periodically drained in preparation for research and analysis.

The anthropology team established an excavation plan that would take place in four stages. The first phase involved laser scanning technology, which would determine the safest manner of access, making sure that the wreck would be protected from damage, along with any artifacts she may have held. The second phase included an examination of a hole in the starboard side of the tank, which provided access for preliminary excavation of the stern. The third phase involved removing a series of iron plates from over the vessel's hull. This process would allow access to begin phase four, which consisted of using hand tools and sifters to screen sediment and identify any possible artifacts.

On March 20, 2001, the first human remains were discovered in the sediment. Owsley confirmed the identification of three ribs from the right side of a man's body. When he viewed the submarine tomb of the Confederate soldiers, instead of merely seeing scattered skeletal remains and sediment, he solemnly visualized the men at their stations as the vessel began to slowly fill with water. He imagined their lives turn to panic as the water crept in, quickly resulting in death. In the final stage of advanced decomposition, bones crumbled to the metal iron floor of submarine to rest in the blue-gray clay-like sediment, which served to preserve the remains for over 137 years. With the ethical and humanitarian respect that had long guided his career, Owsley began assessing and excavating the interior and skeletal remains of the soldiers who served on the Hunley.

On January 25, 2002, the focus of the work shifted from recovery and excavation to the study and identification of the human remains. Once all the bones were removed from the submarine, Owsley and Jantz returned to Charleston to begin reconstructing the remains. They compiled forensic and skeletal data and existing archeological records with historical and genealogical information available for each crewmember. The skulls of the soldiers were very well preserved, allowing Owsley to reconstruct facial features, revealing what each crew member may have looked like. The primary goal was to distinguish and identify the crew members and their remains in order to provide a proper burial.

The forensic analysis of the human remains determined that four men were American, while the others were from Europe. The assessment and determining factors were based on chemical markings left on the teeth and bones, due to the predominant cultural components of their diet. Four of the men had eaten large quantities of maize (or corn), which is considered a staple of the American diet, while the other men primarily ate grains, including wheat and rye, both of which are staples of a European diet. Through careful examination of American Civil War records in comparison with DNA studies performed with the cooperation of possible relatives, forensic genealogist Linda Abrams was able to identify the remains of Lt. Dixon and three other Americans, including Frank G. Collins of Fredericksburg, Virginia; Joseph Ridgaway; and James A. Wicks.

After 140 years to the day, on April 17, 2004, the remains of the Hunley crew were laid to rest at Magnolia Cemetery in Charleston, South Carolina. Several thousand people participated in a funeral procession, including approximately 6,000 American Civil War reenactors, 4,000 civilians wearing period clothing, and color guards from all five branches of the U.S. armed forces. Even though only two of the crew were from the Confederate States, all were buried with full Confederate honors, including burial with the Confederate national flag.

== Exhibits ==
Owsley's primary research is focused on human skeletal remains from the 17th-century Chesapeake region of Virginia and Maryland. The results of this research have been presented to the public in an exhibition at the Smithsonian's Museum of Natural History entitled "Written in Bone: Forensic Files of the 17th-Century Chesapeake". Dr. Owsley is the co-curator of the exhibition, along with Kari Bruwelheide. The exhibition was held February 7, 2009, and closed on January 6, 2014.

== Honors and awards ==
The Secretary's Research Prize is awarded to Smithsonian employees who have done exemplary work in publications, exhibitions, or other research. Ten prizes are awarded every year.
