= Behlen Observatory =

Observatory in Mead, Nebraska, U.S.

- Organization: University of Nebraska–Lincoln
- Location: County Road 8 Mead, Nebraska
- Coordinates: 41°10′15″N 96°26′48″W
- Established: 1972
- Website: observatory.unl.edu

Telescopes
- Boller and Chivens Cassegrain Telescope: 30" reflector

Behlen Observatory is a research facility and astronomical observatory in Mead, Nebraska. It is owned and operated by the astronomy department of the University of Nebraska–Lincoln.

== History ==
In 1971, the University of Nebraska–Lincoln acquired an approximately 17,000-acre site near Mead, Nebraska formerly used by the Nebraska Ordnance Plant to manufacture munitions during World War II. Most of the site was converted for agricultural research, but one building was repurposed as an astronomical observatory. Its location nearly forty miles northeast of Lincoln was considered favorable for its lack of light pollution while still providing quick access to campus and nearby Omaha.

When it opened in 1972, the observatory featured a 30-inch Cassegrain reflector manufactured by Boller and Chivens, acquired at a discounted price as the University of Washington purchased an identical telescope at the same time. The three-story facility included a bomb shelter on the first floor, a holdover from the building's original design, with its computer systems and a newly built dome room above.

The observatory was dedicated in 1993 after a donation from local businessman and longtime patron Walter Behlen. It is now used infrequently as the university has deemphasized its astronomy program, though its original telescope is still occasionally used for variable star research. The Behlen Observatory opens to the public several nights per year and features lectures from NU scientists.

== See also ==
- List of astronomical observatories
