= Lincoln School of Art =

Lincoln School of Art may refer to:

- The School of Art, Art History, and Design at the University of Nebraska–Lincoln
- Lincoln College of Art at the University of Lincoln
