= Mary Manhein =

American forensic anthropologist

- Born: Mary Huffman
- Citizenship: United States
- Education: Louisiana State University
- Partner: William Egan "Bill" Manhein Jr.
- Scientific career
- Workplaces: FACES, Louisiana State University

Mary Huffman Manhein is an American forensic anthropologist. Nicknamed The Bone Lady, she was the founding director of the Forensic Anthropology and Computer Enhancement Services (FACES) laboratory at Louisiana State University (LSU) in 1990, and of the Louisiana Repository for Unidentified and Missing Persons Information Program in 2006. The repository is considered the "most comprehensive statewide database of its kind".

In addition to teaching at LSU, Manhein has worked with law enforcement agencies at local, regional and national levels, consulting on over 1000 cases involving missing or unidentified persons. She is a member of the national Disaster Mortuary Operational Response Team (DMORT) and a fellow of the American Academy of Forensic Sciences. She has been invited to lecture at New Scotland Yard.

As well as academic publications, Manhein has written the non-fiction books The Bone Lady (2000), Trail of Bones (2005), and Bone Remains (2013), and two novels.

== Education ==
Manhein entered Louisiana State University (LSU) as an English student in 1976 and took a class in anthropology as a senior. She graduated with a degree in English literature in 1981. Manhein began volunteering in Douglas W. Owsley's laboratory in the Department of Geography and Anthropology, and earned a master's degree in forensic anthropology from LSU. After Owsley moved to the Smithsonian Institution, Manhein continued to work and teach at LSU, becoming a "Professional in Residence" at LSU’s Department of Geography and Anthropology.

== Career ==
By 1987, Manhein was leading the LSU laboratory for geography and anthropology. She introduced facial reconstruction and imaging to the anthropology program. The Forensic Anthropology and Computer Enhancement Services (FACES) Laboratory was officially formed at LSU in 1990, with Manhein as founding director. Manhein became Deputy Coroner for the East Baton Rouge Parish in 1993. She is certified as an Expert Witness in the Field of Forensic Anthropology, accredited to work in Texas and Louisiana.

Manhein has spent decades visiting police departments, sheriff's offices and coroners throughout the state of Louisiana to gather information about missing people and unidentified remains. She developed an extensive database with this information, and created datasets for identification of North American White, Black and Hispanic peoples. She has established standards for facial tissue depth in the creation of three-dimensional facial reconstructions.

In 2006, Manhein worked with then State Senator Jay Dardenne and State Representative Daniel R. Martiny to initiate a bill in the Louisiana Legislature which led to the creation of the Louisiana Repository for Unidentified and Missing Persons Information Program. Manhein became the director of the repository. The Louisiana legislature also mandated that all unidentified human bones be sent to LSU for identification. One police investigator has commented that before, "unidentified bones usually ended up in a box". The database of missing people in Louisiana is an examplar for other states and has been used to solve both current and cold cases involving missing and unidentified persons.

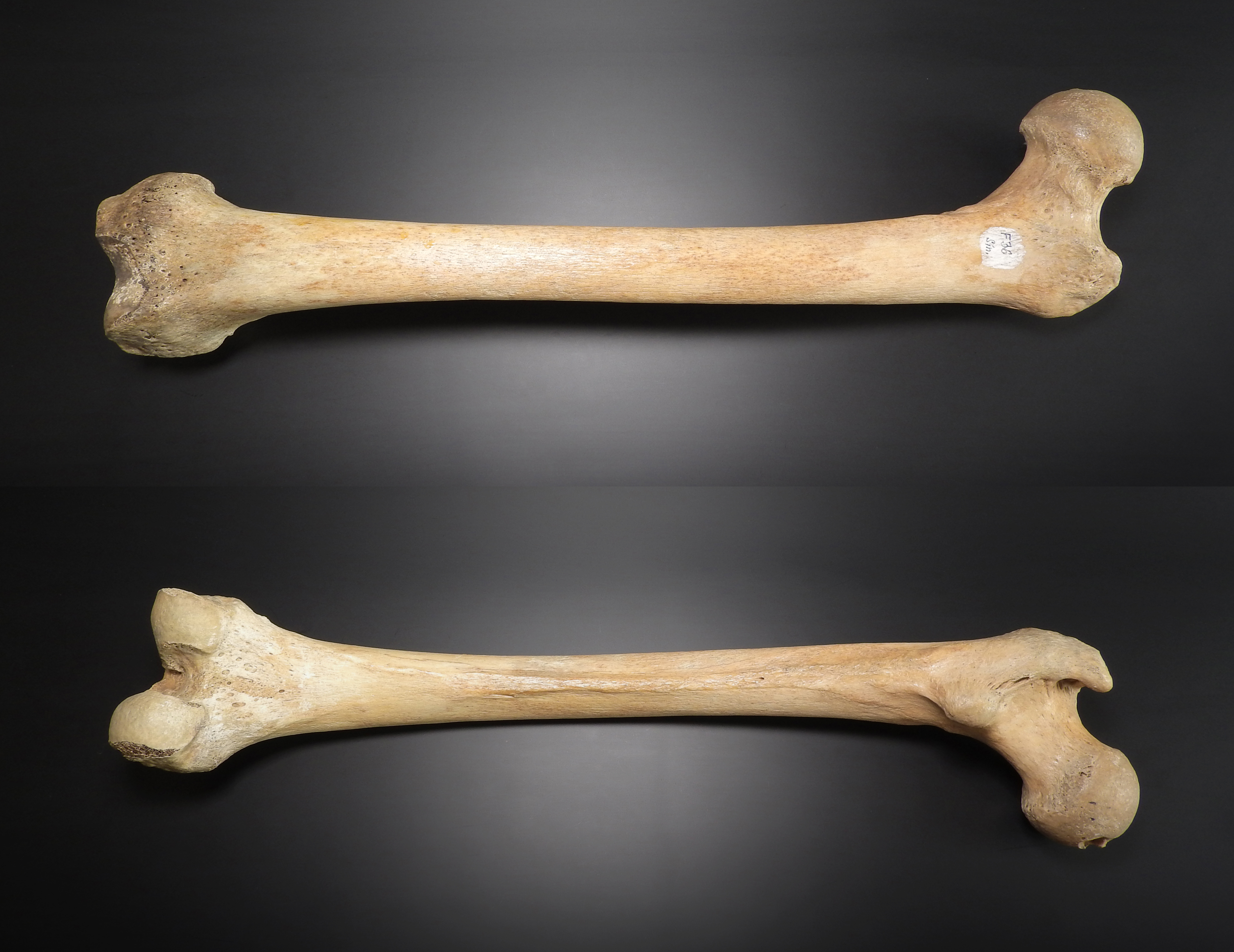
Skeletal remains, human femur

The FACES lab examines skeletal remains for indicators of age, height, race, cause of death and the amount of time since death. Such remains may have been decomposed, skeletonized, or burned before being found and sent to the lab. In some cases the FACES team can quickly determine whether remains reported to them are human or animal based on photographs and measurements of bones. From bones and x-rays, the lab can construct clay models and computer renderings of a person's possible appearance. DNA samples can be taken from bones and teeth if no soft tissue remains. DNA profiles, often prepared by the Louisiana State Police Crime Laboratory, are shared with the national Combined DNA Index System (CODIS) database. The laboratory is also affiliated with the National Center for Missing and Exploited Children, the National Unidentified Persons System and the Doe Network.

Manhein has worked on a number of historical projects including war burials at Port Hudson Confederate Cemetery and analysis of skeletal remains from St. Peter Street Cemetery, New Orleans' oldest formal cemetery.

Other historical identifications include two sailors from the wreck of the USS Monitor, which sank in 1862. Their facial reconstructions were unveiled on the 150th anniversary of the Battle of Hampton Roads, at the United States Navy Memorial in Washington, D.C., and are now in the Office of National Marine Sanctuaries’ Monitor collection.

Possibly the oldest skeleton Manhein has examined was the 2,300 year old “Princess of Thebes” mummy from the Ancient Egypt Gallery of the Louisiana Art and Science Museum in Baton Rouge. Among other things, Manhein determined that the mummy was that of a young man, who had likely died after a fall or other accident.

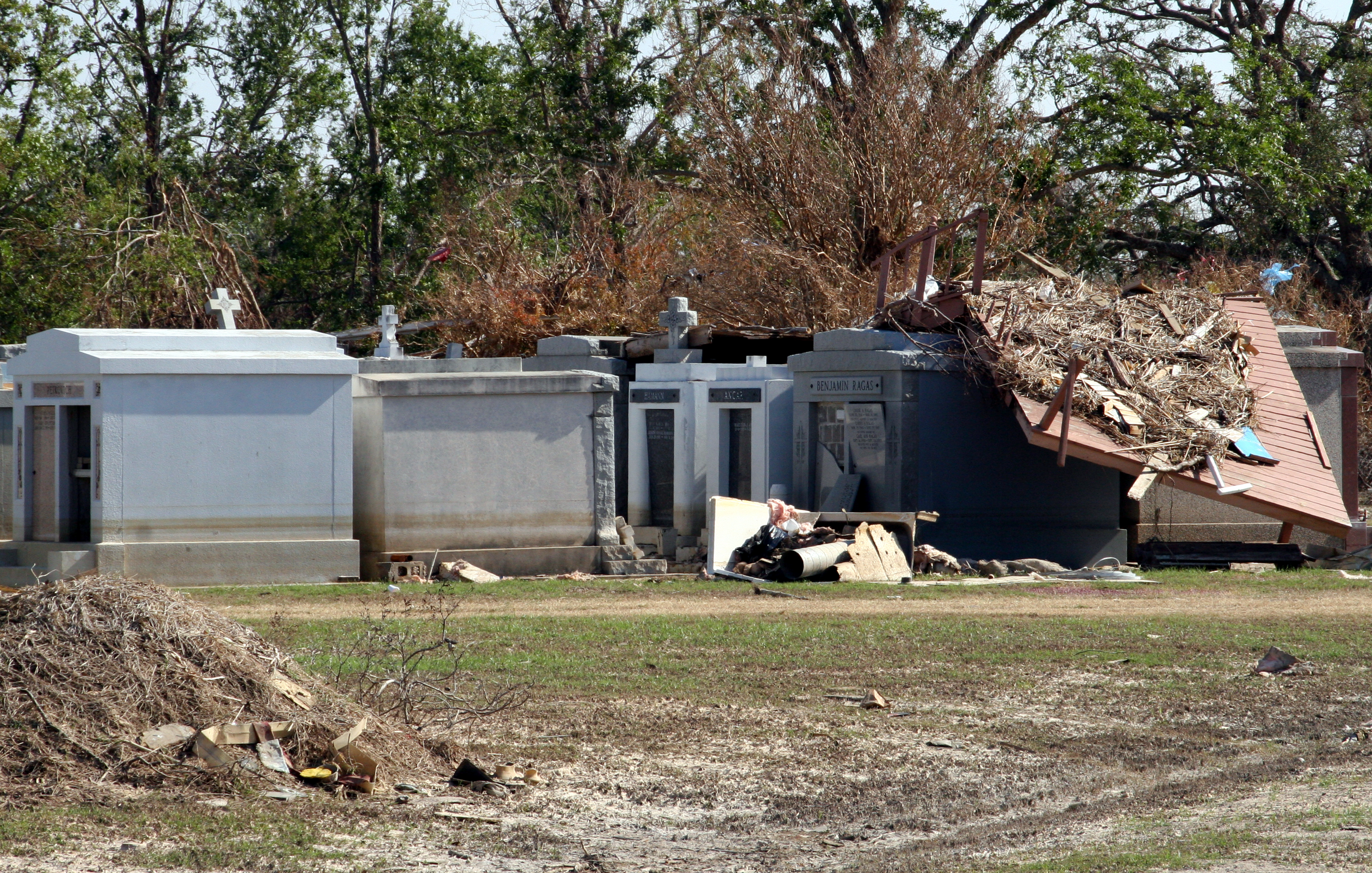
Graves damaged by Hurricane Katrina in Buras, Plaquemines Parish, Louisiana, 2005

Manhein is a member of the national Disaster Mortuary Operational Response Team (DMORT) for Region VI. Manhein has worked with industrial disasters such as the Shell Oil refinery explosion in Norco, Louisiana on May 5, 1988, where she was called in to identify the remains of five employees. She was involved in the recovery and identification of astronauts' remains after the Space Shuttle Columbia disaster in 2003. She has led the FACES team in cemetery recovery work, identifying and returning lost bodies after hurricanes Isaac (2012), Katrina (2005) and Ike (2008) dislodged tombs and burial caskets.

External videos
- “Lake Pontchartrain Jane Doe”, America’s Most Wanted, October 29, 2016

Manhein has frequently appeared on television in connection with her work, on programs such as America’s Most Wanted, Discovery Health, New Detectives, Missing, and CSNBC and MSNBC news. She was interviewed for a 2016 episode of America's Most Wanted as a result of a 2003 attempt to identify "Pontchartrain Jane", whose body was found on June 19, 1986. Manhein was able to rule out one possible identification based on dental evidence, and created a facial reconstruction. Based on her examination, some of the information recorded about the body was revised, which may yet help to identify "The Lady in the Lake". She serves as inspiration for the television show Bones.

Manhein has served as thesis advisor or co-adviser for about 60 master’s students in anthropology and 20 master's students in natural science. She received Outstanding Undergraduate Teaching Awards at lSU in 2006 and 2007. Her students and colleagues include facial recognition specialist Eileen Barrow and Manhein's successor as director at LSU, Ginesse Listi. Manhein retired from LSU in 2015.

== Publications ==
Manhein has published extensively in her field, including both academic papers and the laboratory workbook Introduction to Clay Facial Reconstruction (1996). In addition to her academic publications, Manhein is the author of three non-fiction books about her work, The Bone Lady, (2000) Trail of Bones, (2005) and Bone Remains (2013). She has also published a novel, Floating Souls: The Canal Murders (2012), set in New Orleans; and a young adult novel, Claire Carter: The Mystery of the Bones in the Drainpipe, which is illustrated by Leah Wood Jewett.

As well, Manhein has worked with Jessica H. Schexnayder to document conditions in cemeteries throughout Louisiana, many of which are threatened by coastal erosion, storm surges, and sea level rise due to climate change. They have co-authored Fragile grounds: Louisiana's Endangered Cemeteries (2017).
