= College of Arts and Sciences (University of Nebraska–Lincoln) =

Arts school at the University of Nebraska–Lincoln

- Type: Public
- Established: 1869; 157 years ago
- Parent institution: University of Nebraska–Lincoln
- Dean: Patrick Dussault (interim)
- Faculty: 428 (2025)
- Students: 4,024 (2025)
- Undergraduates: 3,293 (2025)
- Postgraduates: 731 (2025)
- Location: Lincoln, Nebraska
- Campus: Urban
- Website: https://cas.unl.edu/
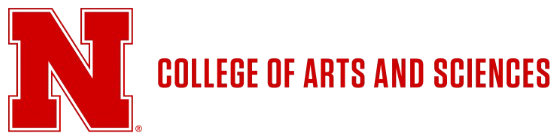

The College of Arts and Sciences (CAS) is the liberal arts and sciences college at the University of Nebraska–Lincoln in Lincoln, Nebraska. CAS was established in 1869, the same year the University of Nebraska was founded. Patrick Dussault is the interim dean and previously served as acting dean and associate dean.

== History ==
The College of Arts and Sciences was founded in 1869, the first college established at the University of Nebraska. CAS began offering classes two years later in University Hall, which at the time was the only building on campus. Charles Henry Oldfather led the college from 1932 to 1952, making him the longest-serving dean of CAS; the twelve-story Oldfather Hall was dedicated in his memory upon its construction in 1970.

CAS's Department of Physics and Astronomy operates the Behlen Observatory in Mead, Nebraska, approximately forty miles north of Lincoln. The facility, constructed in 1972, contains a Cassegrain telescope and is named for donor Walter Behlen. The college operates eleven other research centers: the Center for Digital Research in the Humanities, Center for Great Plains Studies, Center for Brain, Biology and Behavior, Center on Children, Families and the Law, Center for Integrated Biomolecular Communication, Materials Research Sciences and Engineering Center, Nebraska Center for Materials and Nanoscience, Nebraska Center for Virology, Center for Plant Science Innovation, Center for Science, Mathematics and Computer Education, and Rural Drug Addiction Research Center.

== Schools ==
The college's academic areas include the humanities, natural and mathematical sciences, social and behavioral sciences, and interdisciplinary programs. The college offers 28 majors and 46 minors.

The humanities include majors in classics and religious studies, film studies, history, languages, and philosophy as well as five minor-only programs.

The natural and mathematical sciences include majors in actuarial science, biochemistry, biological sciences, chemistry, mathematics, microbiology, and physics.

The social and behavioral sciences include majors in anthropology, communication studies, economics, geography, political science, psychology, and sociology as well as two minor-only programs and one certificate.

The interdisciplinary programs include majors in environmental studies, ethnic studies, global studies, and women's and gender studies as well as twelve minor-only programs and one certificate.
