= Marietta Township, Saunders County, Nebraska =

Marietta Township
- Township
- Location in Saunders County
- Coordinates: 41°15′52″N 096°31′12″W
- Country: United States
- State: Nebraska
- County: Saunders

Area
  - Total: 30.28 sq mi (78.42 km^{2})
  - Land: 30.27 sq mi (78.39 km^{2})
  - Water: 0.012 sq mi (0.03 km^{2}) 0.04%
- Elevation: 1,220 ft (372 m)

Population (2020)
  - Total: 923
  - Density: 30.5/sq mi (11.8/km^{2})
- GNIS feature ID: 0838127

Marietta Township is one of twenty-four townships in Saunders County, Nebraska, United States. The population was 923 at the 2020 census. A 2021 estimate placed the township's population at 937.

The Village of Mead lies within the Township.

== See also ==
- County government in Nebraska
