= Richard Jantz =

American anthropologist

Richard L. Jantz is an American anthropologist. He served as the director of the University of Tennessee Anthropological Research Facility from 1998 to 2011 and he is the current professor emeritus of the Department of Anthropology at the University of Tennessee, Knoxville. His research focuses primarily on forensic anthropology, skeletal biology, dermatoglyphics, anthropometry, anthropological genetics, and human variation, as well as developing computerized databases in these areas which aid in anthropological research. The author of over a hundred journal articles and other publications, his research has helped lead and shape the field of physical and forensic anthropology for many years.

Among his students was Douglas W. Owsley.

== Background ==
Jantz spent his childhood and received his early education in a small town in central Kansas. He attended a community college before attending the University of Kansas, where he took a class from noted anthropologist Dr. William M. Bass. He received a Bachelor of Arts in anthropology in 1962, a Master of Arts in anthropology in 1964, and a Ph.D. in anthropology in 1970, all from the University of Kansas. He realized early on that his strengths lay in statistical analysis of measurements.

== Research ==
Some of Jantz's more current research involves quantitative osteometric and anthropometric variation among Native American populations, including an analysis of the work of Franz Boas.

In the early 1900s, Boas conducted an anthropometric study showing the plasticity of the human body in response to environmental changes. Testing the skeletal measurements of children of immigrants to the US, he found that their measurements were closer to the American mean than to the mean of their home countries. Boas saw this as an argument that nutrition and environment was more important in determining body measurements than racial background, and his study was widely seen as discrediting racial anthropometry.

In 2002, Jantz conducted a reassessment of Boas' study, the first time anyone had examined the validity of Boas’ work. Specimens from Jantz's research ranged in age from 10,000 years old to the modern period. In his reassessment, Jantz argued that Boas’ original claims about the variations in skeletal plasticity between European and American born children was flawed, stating that he could find only insignificant differences between European and American born children. He also argued that exposure to the environment in America did not affect the children's crania. Jantz claims that his work discredited that of Boas although his own study has received criticism.

Jonathan Marks – a well-known physical anthropologist and former president of the General Anthropology section of the American Anthropological Association – has remarked that this reassessment of Boas's work "has the ring of desperation to it (if not obfuscation), and has been quickly rebutted by more mainstream biological anthropology".

In 2003, anthropologists Clarence C. Gravlee, H. Russell Bernard, and William R. Leonard reanalyzed Boas's data and concluded that most of Boas's original findings were correct. Moreover, they applied new statistical, computer-assisted methods to Boas's data and discovered more evidence for cranial plasticity. In a later publication, Gravlee, Bernard and Leonard reviewed Sparks and Jantz's analysis. They argue that Sparks and Jantz misrepresented Boas's claims, and that Sparks's and Jantz's data actually support Boas.

For example, they point out that Sparks and Jantz look at changes in cranial size in relation to how long an individual has been in the United States in order to test the influence of the environment. Boas, however, looked at changes in cranial size in relation to how long the mother had been in the United States. They argue that Boas's method is more useful, because the prenatal environment is a crucial developmental factor.

His other research also includes looking at microevolutionary forces acting on Aleut and Eskimo populations of the Bering Sea using anthropometrics. Databases are currently being developed and maintained for research purposes by Jantz for students and faculty, which include Boas anthropometrics which include body measurements on 15,000 BP Native Americans and 2,000 BP Siberians, Forensic-osteometric and other forensic data from 1,500 BP recent American skeletons, Heinz Brehme Dermatoglyphic Database which includes ridge-counts, pattern classifications on 50,000 BP people from most parts of the world, Plains osteometric cranial and postcranial morphometric data on 2,000 BP individuals from the Great Plains region, the Great Basin, the Southwest and Northwest.

Other recent research includes looking at mtDNA of three Arikara sites in South Dakota that were occupied between AD 1600 and 1832. Analysis from this research shows similarities between these people and other Native American groups. This suggests an admixing of these groups in recent times. Another research project underway is the CT sexing project. This project's goal is to improve the ability to estimate sex from cranial bones; in the absence of the pelvis, professionals consider the skull the second best indicator of sex. Currently, the accuracy lies between 85 and 90% for traditional sexing methods using cranial bones. The CT sexing project strives to increase this accuracy using CT scans of modern skeletal remains from the William Bass Donated Collection. Using these specimens, Jantz has examined sexual dimorphism in greater detail than what can be accomplished through external measurements and observations. This project is being funded by the National Institute of Justice and is being jointly conducted by the Department of Anthropology and the Department of Biomedical Engineering.

Jantz has also played a role in the scientific examination and legal challenge associated with the discovery of Kennewick Man found in Washington on the Columbia River in 1996 and radiocarbon dated to ca. 9,000 years old. Jantz was one of eight anthropologists who sued the federal government to gain more access to Kennewick Man's remains to study. Another project Jantz was involved with was the identification of crew from the Confederate submarine Hunley found off the coast of South Carolina using skeletal data and existing archaeological and genealogical records. Goals include determining the activities of the soldiers that took place on board, the length of time they were on the submarine, and any injuries, malnutrition, or illnesses they might have had. The crew's skeletons were well preserved, making it possible for scientists to do facial reconstructions to show what they might have looked like. Jantz has also been involved in studies reviewing conclusions and reexamining forensic evidence related to the Nikumaroro bones and whether they may belong to the missing aviator Amelia Earhart.

== Awards ==
Dr. Jantz was named a fellow of the American Association for the Advancement of Science for his distinguished contributions of database and software development to the field of biological anthropology. He received the Research and Creative Achievement Award from the University of Tennessee in 2003.

== Major works ==
- Ousley, S.D.; Jantz, R.L. (2005). "FORDISC 3.0: Personal Computer Forensic Discriminant Functions". Archived from the original on 13 September 2015.
- Sparks, C. S.; Jantz, R. L. (2003). "Changing Times, Changing Faces: Franz Boas's Immigrant Study in Modern Perspective". American Anthropologist. 105 (2): 333–337. doi:10.1525/aa.2003.105.2.333.
- Jantz, R. L. (2003). "The anthropometric legacy of Franz Boas". Economics & Human Biology. 1 (2): 277–742. doi:10.1016/S1570-677X(03)00036-4. PMID 15463979.
- Anne Justice; Rohina Rubicz; Geetha Chittoor; Richard L. Jantz; M. H. Crawford (October–December 2010). "Anthropometric Variation Among Bering Sea Natives". Human Biology. 82 (5–6).

== Papers and publications ==
- Jantz, Richard L. (2018). "Amelia Earhart and the Nikumaroro Bones: A 1941 Analysis versus Modern Quantitative Techniques". Forensic Anthropology. 1 (2): 83–98. doi:10.5744/fa.2018.0009.
- Spradley, M. K.; Jantz, R. L. (2011). "Sex Estimation in Forensic Anthropology: Skull Versus Postcranial Elements". Journal of Forensic Sciences. 56 (2): 289–296. doi:10.1111/j.1556-4029.2010.01635.x. PMID 21210801. S2CID 37164548.
- Jantz, R. L.; Logan, M. H. (2010). "Why Does head form change in children of immigrants? A reappraisal". American Journal of Human Biology. 22 (5): 702–707. doi:10.1002/ajhb.21070. PMID 20737620. S2CID 12686512.
- Langley-Shirley, N.; Jantz, R. L. (2010). "A Bayesian Approach to Age Estimation in Modern Americans from the Clavicle". Journal of Forensic Sciences. 55 (3): 571–583. doi:10.1111/j.1556-4029.2010.01089.x. PMID 20384935. S2CID 28527483.
- Ousley, S.; Jantz, R.; Freid, D. (2009). "Understanding race and human variation: Why forensic anthropologists are good at identifying race". American Journal of Physical Anthropology. 139 (1): 68–76. doi:10.1002/ajpa.21006. PMID 19226647.
- Jantz, R. L.; Kimmerle, E. H.; Baraybar, J. P. (2008). "Sexing and Stature Estimation Criteria for Balkan Populations". Journal of Forensic Sciences. 53 (3): 601–605. doi:10.1111/j.1556-4029.2008.00716.x. PMID 18471203. S2CID 36107380.
- Jantz, Richard L. (2006). "Anthropometry". In Douglas H. Ubelaker (ed.). Handbook of North American Indians. Vol. 3. Environment, Origins and Population. Smithsonian Institution. pp. 777–788.
- Durband, A. C.; Kidder, J. H.; Jantz, R. L. (2005). "A multivariate examination of the Hexian calvaria". Anthropological Science. 113 (2): 147–154. doi:10.1537/ase.040303.
- Jantz, R. L. (2001). "Cranial change in Americans: 1850-1975". Journal of Forensic Sciences. 46 (4): 784–787. doi:10.1520/JFS15047J. PMID 11451056.
- Jantz, R.L.; Owsley, Douglas W. (2001). "Variation among early North American Crania". American Journal of Physical Anthropology. 114 (2): 146–55. doi:10.1002/1096-8644(200102)114:2<146::AID-AJPA1014>3.0.CO;2-E. PMID 11169904.
- Owsley, Douglas W.; Jantz, Richard L. (2001). "Archaeological Politics and Public Interest in Paleoamerican Studies: Lessons from Gordon Creek Woman and Kennewick Man". American Antiquity. 66 (4): 565–575. doi:10.2307/2694173. JSTOR 2694173. PMID 20043374. S2CID 5551431.
- Jantz, R.L.; Meadows Jantz, Lee (2000). "Secular change in craniofacial morphology". American Journal of Human Biology. 12 (3): 327–338. doi:10.1002/(SICI)1520-6300(200005/06)12:3<327::AID-AJHB3>3.0.CO;2-1. PMID 11534023. S2CID 22059721.
- Jantz, Richard L.; Owsley, Douglas W. (1999). "Databases for Paleo-American skeletal biology research". In Bonnichsen, Robson (ed.). Who were the first Americans: Proceedings of the 58th Annual Biology Colloquium. Center for the Study of the First Americans, Oregon State University. pp. 79–96. ISBN 9780912933207.
- Wescott, D. J.; Jantz, R. L. (1999). "Anthropometric variation among the Sioux and the Assiniboine". Human Biology. 71 (5): 847–858. PMID 10510574.
- Burns, Karen Ramey; Jantz, Richard L.; King, Thomas F.; Gillespie, Richard E. (5 December 1998). "Amelia Earhart's Bones and Shoes? Current Anthropological Perspectives on an Historical Mystery" (PDF). TIGHAR.
- Jantz, R. L.; Brehme, H. (1993). "Directional and fluctuating asymmetry in the palmar interdigital ridge-counts". Anthropologischer Anzeiger. 51 (1): 59–67. doi:10.1127/anthranz/51/1993/59. JSTOR 29540279. PMID 8476275.
- Jantz, R. L.; Hunt, D. R.; Falsetti, A. B.; Key, P. J. (1992). "Variation among North Amerindians: Analysis of Boas's anthropometric data". Human Biology. 64 (3): 435–461. PMID 1607187.
- Brehme, H.; Jantz, R. L.; Hauser, G.; Okajima, M.; Eriksson, A. W.; Hitzeroth, H. W.; Wojciechowska, H.; Mullis, M. -L. (1990). "Palm and sole interdigital ridge-count correlations". Zeitschrift für Morphologie und Anthropologie. 78 (2): 243–256. doi:10.1127/zma/78/1990/243. JSTOR 25757287. PMID 2077775.
- Key, P. J.; Jantz, R. L. (1990). "Statistical assessment of population variability: A methodological approach". American Journal of Physical Anthropology. 82 (1): 53–59. doi:10.1002/ajpa.1330820107. PMID 2349971.
- Owsley, D. W.; Jantz, R. L. (1985). "Long bone lengths and gestational age distributions of post-contact period Arikara Indian perinatal infant skeletons". American Journal of Physical Anthropology. 68 (3): 321–328. doi:10.1002/ajpa.1330680303. PMID 3904476.
- Jantz, R. L.; Chopra, V. P. (1983). "A comparison of dermatoglyphic methodologies in population studies". American Journal of Physical Anthropology. 60 (1): 61–67. doi:10.1002/ajpa.1330600110. PMID 6869503.
- Jantz, Richard L.; Brehme, Heinz (1982). "On the epidermal pattern system of seven families with triplets of various zygosity patterns". Mittheilungen der Anthropologischen Gesellschaft in Wien. 112: 1–15.
- Jantz, R. L.; V, D. W.; Willey, P. (1981). "Craniometric Variation in the Northern and Central Plains". Plains Anthropologist. 26 (94): 19–29. doi:10.1080/2052546.1981.11909048. JSTOR 25667733.
- Schwidetzky, I.; Jantz, R. L. (1979). "Race differences in the sex dimorphism of dermatoglyphic traits". Journal of Human Evolution. 8 (8): 773–776. doi:10.1016/0047-2484(79)90006-X.
- Jantz, R. L. (1974). "The Redbird Focus: Cranial Evidence in Tribal Identification". Plains Anthropologist. 19 (63): 5–13. doi:10.1080/2052546.1974.11908683. JSTOR 25667179.
- Bass, William M.; Evans, David R.; Jantz, Richard L. (1971). The Leavenworth Site Cemetery: Archaeology and Physical Anthropology. University of Kansas.
- Jantz, R. L.; Johnston, F. E.; Kensinger, K. M.; Walker, G. F. (1970). "Palmar Dermatoglyphics of the Peruvian Cashinahua". Human Heredity. 20 (6): 642–649. doi:10.1159/000152371. PMID 5514304.
