= George W. Gill =

American anthropologist

- Occupation: Anthropologist
- Organization: University of Wyoming

George W. Gill is an American anthropologist, and a Professor Emeritus at the University of Wyoming who specializes in skeletal biology.

== Career ==
In the late 1980s, partly in response to demands from American forensic anthropology organizations to scrutinize methods of racial identification in order to ensure accuracy in legal cases, Gill tested, supported, and developed craniofacial anthropometric and other means of estimating the racial origins of skeletal remains. He found that the employment of multiple criteria can yield very high rates of accuracy, and even that individual methods can be accurate more than 80 percent of the time.

Gill cites these findings in arguing against the scientific consensus to treat human races as social constructs. Gill suggests that "race denial" can stem from overstatements of the importance of clinal variation among human phenotypes, and from "politically motivated censorship" in the mistaken but "politically correct" belief that "race promotes racism". Gill argues that "we can often function within systems that we do not believe in": Categories can have practical utility, even if they also seem conceptually problematic.

Gill served on a NOVA-sponsored panel in which he and five others debated the reality of race. Among Gill's opponents was American anthropologist C. Loring Brace—a fellow plaintiff in the Kennewick Man case—who maintains that the term "race" is not warranted by "a biological entity".

=== Easter Island ===
Gill has researched human osteology on the Polynesian island and Chilean territory of Easter Island, and in 1981 led the National Geographic Society's Easter Island Anthropological Expedition. Materials that he has gathered form part of the osteological collection of Chile's national museum. He is collaborating with former students on a book about the island, which will aim to "explain the origins of the people and the decline of their ancient advanced culture".

=== Kennewick Man ===
Gill has studied Kennewick Man, the skeletal remains of a prehistoric man found near Kennewick in the U.S. state of Washington. Gill was among the scientists who successfully sued the United States in order to gain access to the remains, which had been claimed by the Umatilla and other American Indian tribes under a contested interpretation of the Native American Graves Protection and Repatriation Act.
