= Mead, Nebraska =

Village in Saunders County, Nebraska, United States

- Village
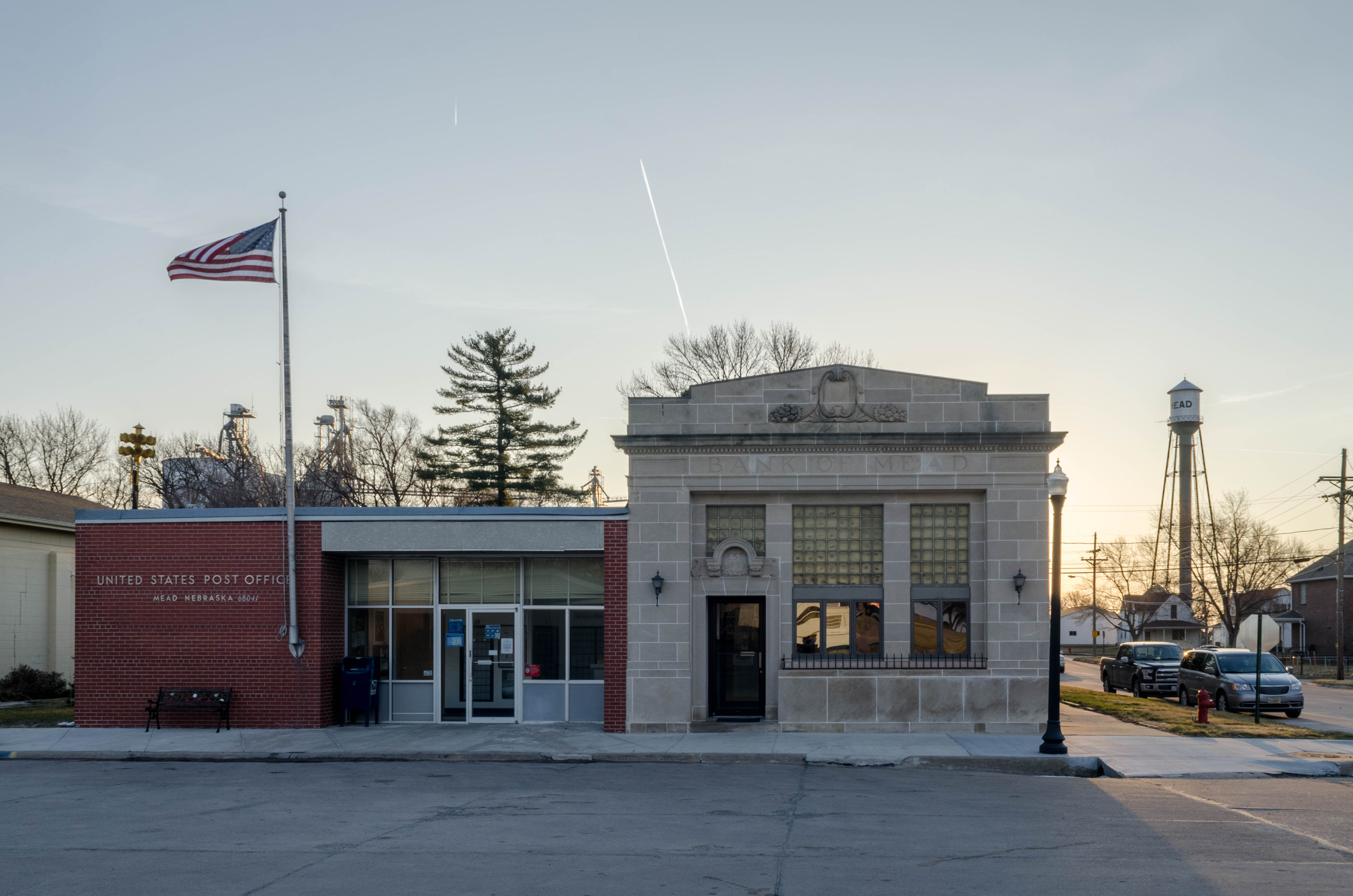
- Post office, bank, and water tower in Mead, March 2017

- Location of Mead, Nebraska

- Location within Nebraska Location within the United States
- Coordinates: 41°13′43″N 96°29′20″W
- Country: United States
- State: Nebraska
- County: Saunders
- Township: Marietta

Area
  - Total: 0.62 sq mi (1.60 km^{2})
  - Land: 0.61 sq mi (1.58 km^{2})
  - Water: 0.012 sq mi (0.03 km^{2})
- Elevation: 1,207 ft (368 m)

Population (2020)
  - Total: 617
  - Density: 1,013.6/sq mi (391.37/km^{2})
- Time zone: UTC-6 (Central (CST))
  - Summer (DST): UTC-5 (CDT)
- ZIP code: 68041
- Area code: 402
- FIPS code: 31-31395
- GNIS feature ID: 2399299
- Website: www.meadnebraska.net

Mead is a village in Saunders County, Nebraska, United States. The population was 617 at the 2020 census.

== History ==
Mead was originally built up chiefly by Swedes. Mead was first called Saunders, and under the latter name was platted in 1877 when the railroad was extended to that point. It was renamed in 1880, likely for a Union Pacific railroad official.

The E3 Biofuels, an ethanol production facility in the country, used a patented "closed loop" system. E3 started operation in 2007 and went bankrupt a few months later in late 2007. AltEn reopened the plant. The plant closed again in February 2021. The plant property is highly contaminated with neonicotinoids.

== Demographics ==
Historical population
Census	Pop.	Note	%±
1890	324		—
1900	330		1.9%
1910	330		0.0%
1920	329		−0.3%
1930	310		−5.8%
1940	260		−16.1%
1950	388		49.2%
1960	428		10.3%
1970	488		14.0%
1980	506		3.7%
1990	513		1.4%
2000	564		9.9%
2010	569		0.9%
2020	617		8.4%
U.S. Decennial Census

=== 2010 census ===
As of the census of 2010, there were 569 people, 215 households, and 159 families living in the village. The population density was 932.8 inhabitants per square mile (360.2/km^{2}). There were 235 housing units at an average density of 385.2 per square mile (148.7/km^{2}). The racial makeup of the village was 98.1% White, 0.2% Native American, 0.4% Asian, 1.1% from other races, and 0.4% from two or more races. Hispanic or Latino of any race were 3.0% of the population.

There were 215 households, of which 40.9% had children under the age of 18 living with them, 55.3% were married couples living together, 12.6% had a female householder with no husband present, 6.0% had a male householder with no wife present, and 26.0% were non-families. 21.4% of all households were made up of individuals, and 7.4% had someone living alone who was 65 years of age or older. The average household size was 2.65 and the average family size was 3.04.

The median age in the village was 37.1 years. 28.8% of residents were under the age of 18; 6.7% were between the ages of 18 and 24; 25.6% were from 25 to 44; 25.9% were from 45 to 64; and 13.2% were 65 years of age or older. The gender makeup of the village was 49.6% male and 50.4% female.

=== 2000 census ===
As of the census of 2000, there were 564 people, 203 households, and 156 families living in the village. The population density was 1,758.8 inhabitants per square mile (679.1/km^{2}). There were 210 housing units at an average density of 654.9 per square mile (252.9/km^{2}). The racial makeup of the village was 98.76% White, 0.18% Asian, 0.18% from other races, and 0.89% from two or more races. Hispanic or Latino of any race were 2.13% of the population.

There were 203 households, out of which 36.5% had children under the age of 18 living with them, 64.0% were married couples living together, 8.9% had a female householder with no husband present, and 22.7% were non-families. 16.3% of all households were made up of individuals, and 7.9% had someone living alone who was 65 years of age or older. The average household size was 2.78 and the average family size was 3.11.

In the village, the population was spread out, with 28.4% under the age of 18, 9.0% from 18 to 24, 32.3% from 25 to 44, 19.3% from 45 to 64, and 11.0% who were 65 years of age or older. The median age was 34 years. For every 100 females, there were 99.3 males. For every 100 females age 18 and over, there were 98.0 males.

As of 2000 the median income for a household in the village was $51,339, and the median income for a family was $51,354. Males had a median income of $35,357 versus $21,806 for females. The per capita income for the village was $17,654. About 1.2% of families and 2.7% of the population were below the poverty line, including 1.1% of those under age 18 and 4.4% of those age 65 or over.

== Geography ==
According to the United States Census Bureau, the village has a total area of 0.62 square miles (1.61 km^{2}), of which 0.61 square miles (1.58 km^{2}) is land and 0.01 square miles (0.03 km^{2}) is water.

=== Climate ===
Climate data for Mead 6S, Nebraska (1991–2020, extremes 1968–present)
Month	Jan	Feb	Mar	Apr	May	Jun	Jul	Aug	Sep	Oct	Nov	Dec	Year
Record high °F (°C)	71 (22)	78 (26)	90 (32)	97 (36)	99 (37)	108 (42)	107 (42)	105 (41)	107 (42)	95 (35)	86 (30)	69 (21)	108 (42)
Mean maximum °F (°C)	56.4 (13.6)	62.4 (16.9)	76.1 (24.5)	85.4 (29.7)	90.8 (32.7)	94.9 (34.9)	97.4 (36.3)	96.1 (35.6)	93.0 (33.9)	86.5 (30.3)	72.7 (22.6)	59.4 (15.2)	99.1 (37.3)
Mean daily maximum °F (°C)	32.7 (0.4)	37.4 (3.0)	50.5 (10.3)	62.7 (17.1)	72.6 (22.6)	82.8 (28.2)	86.6 (30.3)	84.5 (29.2)	78.4 (25.8)	65.4 (18.6)	50.0 (10.0)	37.0 (2.8)	61.7 (16.5)
Daily mean °F (°C)	22.4 (−5.3)	26.6 (−3.0)	38.6 (3.7)	49.9 (9.9)	60.9 (16.1)	71.3 (21.8)	75.1 (23.9)	72.9 (22.7)	65.1 (18.4)	52.3 (11.3)	38.2 (3.4)	27.0 (−2.8)	50.0 (10.0)
Mean daily minimum °F (°C)	12.0 (−11.1)	15.9 (−8.9)	26.6 (−3.0)	37.2 (2.9)	49.3 (9.6)	59.9 (15.5)	63.7 (17.6)	61.3 (16.3)	51.8 (11.0)	39.2 (4.0)	26.3 (−3.2)	16.9 (−8.4)	38.3 (3.5)
Mean minimum °F (°C)	−8.5 (−22.5)	−3.3 (−19.6)	6.9 (−13.9)	22.6 (−5.2)	35.7 (2.1)	48.6 (9.2)	53.6 (12.0)	51.1 (10.6)	37.2 (2.9)	23.1 (−4.9)	9.9 (−12.3)	−2.9 (−19.4)	−12.4 (−24.7)
Record low °F (°C)	−37 (−38)	−29 (−34)	−18 (−28)	3 (−16)	23 (−5)	35 (2)	39 (4)	38 (3)	26 (−3)	9 (−13)	−7 (−22)	−27 (−33)	−37 (−38)
Average precipitation inches (mm)	0.62 (16)	0.78 (20)	1.53 (39)	2.92 (74)	4.72 (120)	4.90 (124)	3.08 (78)	3.77 (96)	3.15 (80)	2.18 (55)	1.33 (34)	1.12 (28)	30.10 (765)
Average snowfall inches (cm)	4.7 (12)	6.0 (15)	2.6 (6.6)	0.8 (2.0)	0.1 (0.25)	0.0 (0.0)	0.0 (0.0)	0.0 (0.0)	0.0 (0.0)	0.5 (1.3)	1.2 (3.0)	4.4 (11)	20.3 (52)
Average precipitation days (≥ 0.01 in)	4.4	4.9	6.5	9.1	11.8	9.6	8.4	8.9	6.9	6.6	4.7	4.9	86.7
Average snowy days (≥ 0.1 in)	2.9	2.9	1.4	0.2	0.0	0.0	0.0	0.0	0.0	0.2	1.0	2.6	11.2
Source: NOAA

== See also ==
- List of municipalities in Nebraska
