= William Kelso =

American archaeologist

William M. Kelso, C.B.E., Ph.D., F.S.A. (born 30 March 1941), often referred to as Bill Kelso, is an American archaeologist specializing in Virginia's colonial period, particularly the Jamestown settlement. He is currently the Emeritus Director of Archaeology and Research at the Jamestown Rediscovery Foundation, having retired in 2021.

== Personal life ==
A native of Lakeside, Ohio, Kelso earned a B.A. in History from Baldwin-Wallace College, an M.A. in Early American History from the College of William and Mary, and a Ph.D in Historical Archaeology from Emory University. His doctorate thesis, overseen by Ivor Noël Hume, covered the archaeology of Wormsloe Plantation in Georgia. He married schoolteacher Ellen Beveridge in 1962, and has two children.

== Career ==
Kelso has served as director of archaeology at Carter's Grove, Monticello, and Poplar Forest, as well as Commissioner of Archaeology for the Virginia Historic Landmarks Commission. During his 14 years at Monticello, he was one of the first to make early colonial slave life the focus of archaeological research.

=== Rediscovery of Jamestown ===
The prevailing opinion by the 1990s was that most or all of the original Jamestown location had long since washed into the James River. In 1993, Kelso became the Director of Archaeology for the Association for the Preservation of Virginia Antiquities (now Preservation Virginia) and launched the Jamestown Rediscovery project, starting excavations on Jamestown Island to ascertain if that was truly the case. It was not long before Kelso's small team uncovered the footprint of the fort's southern palisade in 1994. His 2004 book includes an in-depth study of the features uncovered during the excavations.

=== Published works ===
- Kingsmill Plantations, 1619-1800: Archaeology of Country Life in Colonial Virginia. Charlottesville: University of Virginia Press, 1984. ISBN 978-0917565120
- (with J. Deetz) Archaeology at Monticello. Chapel Hill: University of North Carolina Press, 2002. ISBN 978-1882886050
- (with B. Straube) Jamestown Rediscovery: 1994-2004. Richmond: APVA Preservation Virginia, 2004. ISBN 978-0917565137
- Jamestown: The Buried Truth. Charlottesville: University of Virginia Press, 2006. ISBN 978-0813925639
- Jamestown: The Truth Revealed. Charlottesville: University of Virginia Press, 2017. ISBN 978-0813939933
- Captain Jones's Wormslow: A Historical, Archaeological, and Architectural Study of an Eighteenth-Century Plantation Site near Savannah, Georgia. Athens: University of Georgia Press, 2017. ISBN 978-0820352152
- Jamestown Archaeology: Remains To Be Seen. New York: Routledge, 2023. ISBN 978-1032579368

== Awards ==
In 2007 Kelso received the J. C. Harrington Award, presented by the Society for Historical Archaeology for his life-time contributions to archaeology centered on scholarship. In July 2012, as a result of his work on Jamestown Island, he was awarded an honorary knighthood as Commander of the Most Excellent Order of the British Empire at the British Embassy in Washington, D.C on behalf of Queen Elizabeth II, whom he had escorted during her visit to Jamestown in 2007.
