= Walter Behlen =

Walter Dietrich Behlen (October 16, 1905 – July 26, 1994) was born on a small farm near Columbus, Nebraska. He was the second of nine children born to Fred and Ella Behlen. His high school education was interrupted by illness, but he returned to school at age 20, and received his diploma at age 23. He married Ruby Cumming in 1940; the couple had two children.

Behlen began his industrial career and the Behlen Manufacturing Company as a one-man operation in 1936. While working as a railway express man, he began producing steel toe caps for wooden-soled industrial shoes using various hand tools, a grinder poured from scrap metal, and a homemade forge he had installed in his garage workshop. During this time he also invented a lid clamp for wooden egg cases, which became "the first of a long line of products completely designed and fabricated in our factory." This part-time operation continued until 1941 when Walter and his father, Fred, began manufacturing small products as a full-time occupation. They were joined by Walter's brothers, H.P. "Mike" Behlen and G.E. "Gib" Behlen in 1946. The 1946 product line included the Behlen corn crib, portable farm grain dryers, and grain tanks.

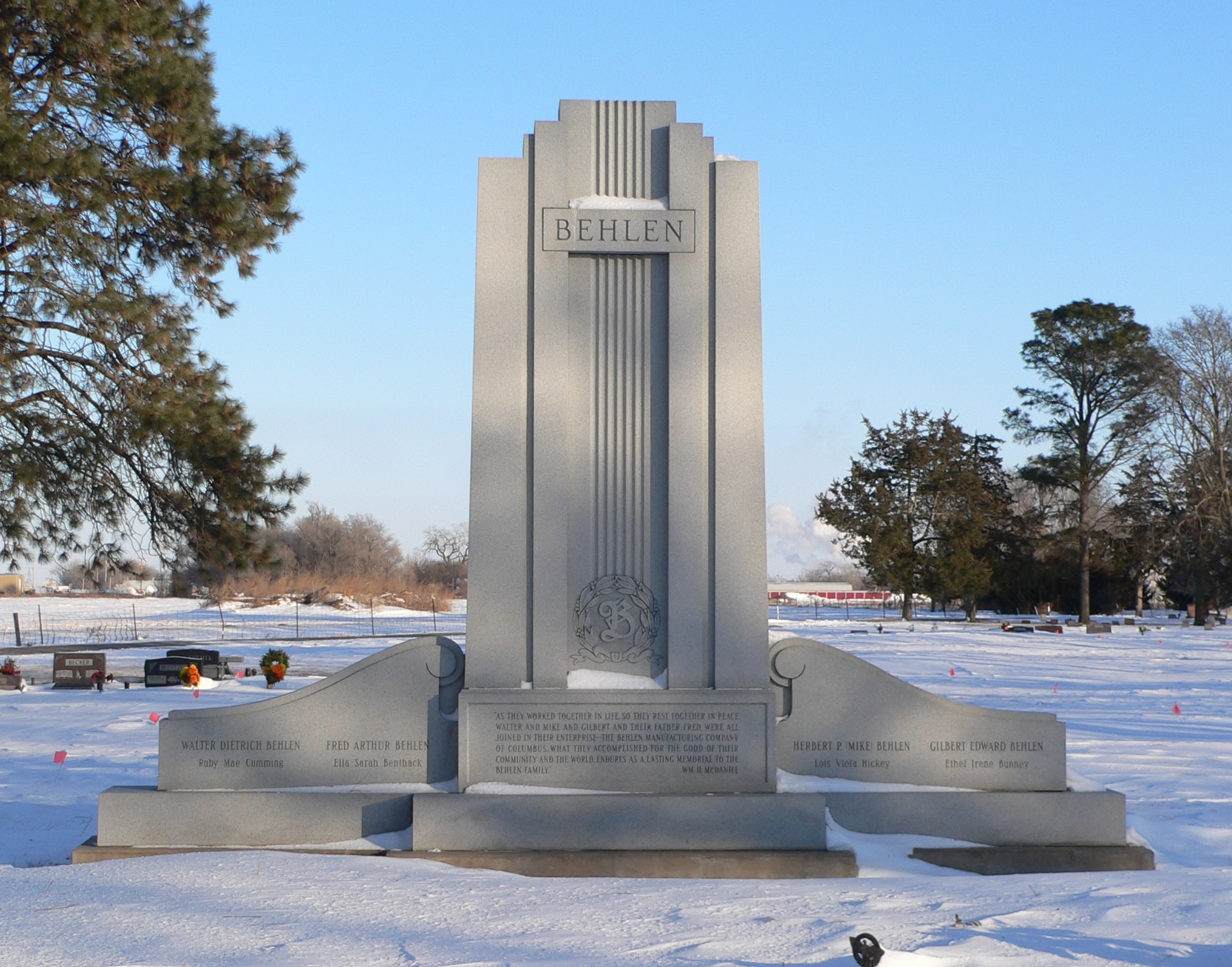
Monument in Columbus Cemetery in Columbus, Nebraska, marking graves of Walter, Fred, Herbert (Mike), and Gilbert Behlen.

The Behlen Manufacturing Company's best-known product was the frameless steel building system that it developed in 1950. This system employed deeply corrugated steel panels, which could be assembled to form a complete load-bearing shell without any supporting frame. In 1955, a Behlen building survived an atomic blast test at Operation Cue in the Nevada desert. This building was put on display at the 1955 Nebraska State Fair. Behlen buildings can be found all over the United States, as well as in many foreign countries. Behlen's 19-acre (77,000 m^{2}) facility in Columbus employed some 1100 people at its height. A nationwide network of five hundred builders marketed the company's product.

In 1969, Behlen Manufacturing Company became a subsidiary of the Wickes Corporation of Saginaw, Michigan. This arrangement continued until 1984, when the local management bought the company through a leveraged buyout. The company continued to be locally owned.

Among the awards and honors he received over many years of business and civic service, Behlen earned the Horatio Alger Award in 1968, the first Nebraskan to be so honored. He was granted honorary doctorates from the University of Nebraska–Lincoln, Midland College, and Doane College. Walter Behlen died on July 26, 1994.
