= Poile =

Poile may refer to:

== People ==
- Poile (surname), including a list of people with the surname
- Poile Sengupta, Indian English-language writer and playwright born Ambika Gopalakrishnan in 1948

== Geography ==
- La Poile Bay, a bay in Newfoundland, Canada
- La Poile, Newfoundland and Labrador, a settlement on the bay

== See also ==
- Norman R. "Bud" Poile Trophy, presented annually
- Norman R. "Bud" Poile Trophy (IHL), awarded annually
- Poil, a commune in Nièvre department, France
- Poilley (disambiguation)
- Poilly
- Pouilly (disambiguation)
- Pouillé (disambiguation)
