= 2022 Critérium du Dauphiné =

2022 UCI World Tour, race 21 of 32

Race details
- Dates: 5–12 June 2022
- Stages: 8
- Distance: 1,194.4 km (742.2 mi)

Results
Jersey awarded to the overall winner	Winner	Primož Roglič (SLO)	(Team Jumbo–Visma)
	Second	Jonas Vingegaard (DEN)	(Team Jumbo–Visma)
	Third	Ben O'Connor (AUS)	(AG2R Citroën Team)
Jersey awarded to the points classification winner	Points	Wout van Aert (BEL)	(Team Jumbo–Visma)
Jersey awarded to the mountains classification winner	Mountains	Pierre Rolland (FRA)	(B&B Hotels–KTM)
Jersey awarded to the young rider classification winner	Young rider	Tobias Halland Johannessen (NOR)	(Uno-X Pro Cycling Team)
Jersey awarded to the team classification winner	Team	Team Jumbo–Visma	

The 2022 Critérium du Dauphiné was the 74th edition of the Critérium du Dauphiné, a road cycling stage race in the Dauphiné region of southeastern France. The race took place between 5 and 12 June 2022.

== Teams ==
All eighteen UCI WorldTeams and four UCI ProTeams make up the twenty-two teams that participate in the race.

UCI WorldTeams

- AG2R Citroën Team
- Astana Qazaqstan Team
- Bora–Hansgrohe
- Cofidis
- EF Education–EasyPost
- Groupama–FDJ
- INEOS Grenadiers
- Intermarché–Wanty–Gobert Matériaux
- Israel–Premier Tech
- Lotto–Soudal
- Movistar Team
- Quick-Step Alpha Vinyl Team
- Team Bahrain Victorious
- Team BikeExchange–Jayco
- Team DSM
- Team Jumbo–Visma
- Trek–Segafredo
- UAE Team Emirates

UCI ProTeams

- Arkéa–Samsic
- B&B Hotels–KTM
- Team TotalEnergies
- Uno-X Pro Cycling Team

== Route ==
Stage characteristics
Stage	Date	Course	Distance	Type	Winner
1	5 June	La Voulte-sur-Rhône to Beauchastel	192 km (119 mi)	Hilly stage	Wout van Aert (BEL)
2	6 June	Saint-Péray to Brives-Charensac	170 km (110 mi)	Hilly stage	Alexis Vuillermoz (FRA)
3	7 June	Saint-Paulien to Chastreix-Sancy	169 km (105 mi)	Hilly stage	David Gaudu (FRA)
4	8 June	Montbrison to La Bâtie d'Urfé	31.9 km (19.8 mi)	Individual time trial	Filippo Ganna (ITA)
5	9 June	Thizy-les-Bourgs to Chaintré	162.5 km (101.0 mi)	Hilly stage	Wout van Aert (BEL)
6	10 June	Rives to Gap	196.5 km (122.1 mi)	Hilly stage	Valentin Ferron (FRA)
7	11 June	Saint-Chaffrey to Vaujany	135 km (84 mi)	Mountain stage	Carlos Verona (ESP)
8	12 June	Saint-Alban-Leysse to Plateau de Solaison	137.5 km (85.4 mi)	Mountain stage	Jonas Vingegaard (DEN)
Total			1,194.4 km (742.2 mi)		

== Stages ==
=== Stage 1 ===
5 June 2022 — La Voulte-sur-Rhône to Beauchastel, 192 km (119 mi)

Stage 1 Result
Rank	Rider	Team	Time
1	Wout van Aert (BEL)	Team Jumbo–Visma	4h 37' 31"
2	Ethan Hayter (GBR)	INEOS Grenadiers	+ 0"
3	Sean Quinn (USA)	EF Education–EasyPost	+ 0"
4	Hugo Page (FRA)	Intermarché–Wanty–Gobert Matériaux	+ 0"
5	Edvald Boasson Hagen (NOR)	Team TotalEnergies	+ 0"
6	Jasper Stuyven (BEL)	Trek–Segafredo	+ 0"
7	Clément Venturini (FRA)	AG2R Citroën Team	+ 0"
8	Maxim Van Gils (BEL)	Lotto–Soudal	+ 0"
9	Benjamin Thomas (FRA)	Cofidis	+ 0"
10	Jannik Steimle (GER)	Quick-Step Alpha Vinyl Team	+ 0"

General classification after Stage 1
Rank	Rider	Team	Time
1	Wout van Aert (BEL)	Team Jumbo–Visma	4h 37' 21"
2	Ethan Hayter (GBR)	INEOS Grenadiers	+ 4"
3	Sean Quinn (USA)	EF Education–EasyPost	+ 6"
4	Maxime Bouet (FRA)	Arkéa–Samsic	+ 7"
5	Laurens Huys (BEL)	Intermarché–Wanty–Gobert Matériaux	+ 8"
6	Pierre Rolland (FRA)	B&B Hotels–KTM	+ 9"
7	Hugo Page (FRA)	Intermarché–Wanty–Gobert Matériaux	+ 10"
8	Edvald Boasson Hagen (NOR)	Team TotalEnergies	+ 10"
9	Jasper Stuyven (BEL)	Trek–Segafredo	+ 10"
10	Clément Venturini (FRA)	AG2R Citroën Team	+ 10"

=== Stage 2 ===
6 June 2022 — Saint-Péray to Brives-Charensac, 170 km (110 mi)

Stage 2 Result
Rank	Rider	Team	Time
1	Alexis Vuillermoz (FRA)	Team TotalEnergies	4h 03' 34"
2	Anders Skaarseth (NOR)	Uno-X Pro Cycling Team	+ 0"
3	Olivier Le Gac (FRA)	Groupama–FDJ	+ 0"
4	Kevin Vermaerke (USA)	Team DSM	+ 0"
5	Anthony Delaplace (FRA)	Arkéa–Samsic	+ 0"
6	Wout van Aert (BEL)	Team Jumbo–Visma	+ 5"
7	Ethan Hayter (GBR)	INEOS Grenadiers	+ 5"
8	Hugo Page (FRA)	Intermarché–Wanty–Gobert Matériaux	+ 5"
9	Clément Venturini (FRA)	AG2R Citroën Team	+ 5"
10	Aleksandr Riabushenko^{[a]}	Astana Qazaqstan Team	+ 5"

General classification after Stage 2
Rank	Rider	Team	Time
1	Alexis Vuillermoz (FRA)	Team TotalEnergies	8h 40' 55"
2	Anders Skaarseth (NOR)	Uno-X Pro Cycling Team	+ 3"
3	Olivier Le Gac (FRA)	Groupama–FDJ	+ 4"
4	Wout van Aert (BEL)	Team Jumbo–Visma	+ 5"
5	Kevin Vermaerke (USA)	Team DSM	+ 7"
6	Ethan Hayter (GBR)	INEOS Grenadiers	+ 9"
7	Anthony Delaplace (FRA)	Arkéa–Samsic	+ 10"
8	Sean Quinn (USA)	EF Education–EasyPost	+ 11"
9	Maxime Bouet (FRA)	Arkéa–Samsic	+ 12"
10	Laurens Huys (BEL)	Intermarché–Wanty–Gobert Matériaux	+ 13"

=== Stage 3 ===
7 June 2022 — Saint-Paulien to Chastreix-Sancy, 169 km (105 mi)

Stage 3 Result
Rank	Rider	Team	Time
1	David Gaudu (FRA)	Groupama–FDJ	4h 09' 38"
2	Wout van Aert (BEL)	Team Jumbo–Visma	+ 0"
3	Victor Lafay (FRA)	Cofidis	+ 0"
4	Ruben Guerreiro (POR)	EF Education–EasyPost	+ 0"
5	Kevin Geniets (LUX)	Groupama–FDJ	+ 0"
6	Nick Schultz (AUS)	Team BikeExchange–Jayco	+ 0"
7	Damiano Caruso (ITA)	Team Bahrain Victorious	+ 0"
8	Dylan Teuns (BEL)	Team Bahrain Victorious	+ 0"
9	Matteo Jorgenson (USA)	Movistar Team	+ 0"
10	Brandon McNulty (USA)	UAE Team Emirates	+ 0"

General classification after Stage 3
Rank	Rider	Team	Time
1	Wout van Aert (BEL)	Team Jumbo–Visma	12h 50' 32"
2	David Gaudu (FRA)	Groupama–FDJ	+ 6"
3	Victor Lafay (FRA)	Cofidis	+ 12"
4	Patrick Konrad (AUT)	Bora–Hansgrohe	+ 16"
5	Matteo Jorgenson (USA)	Movistar Team	+ 16"
6	Ruben Guerreiro (POR)	EF Education–EasyPost	+ 16"
7	Esteban Chaves (COL)	EF Education–EasyPost	+ 16"
8	Primož Roglič (SLO)	Team Jumbo–Visma	+ 16"
9	Steff Cras (BEL)	Lotto–Soudal	+ 16"
10	Ben O'Connor (AUS)	AG2R Citroën Team	+ 16"

=== Stage 4 ===
8 June 2022 — Montbrison to La Bâtie d'Urfé, 31.9 km (19.8 mi) (ITT)

Stage 4 Result
Rank	Rider	Team	Time
1	Filippo Ganna (ITA)	INEOS Grenadiers	35' 32"
2	Wout van Aert (BEL)	Team Jumbo–Visma	+ 2"
3	Ethan Hayter (GBR)	INEOS Grenadiers	+ 17"
4	Mattia Cattaneo (ITA)	Quick-Step Alpha Vinyl Team	+ 39"
5	Primož Roglič (SLO)	Team Jumbo–Visma	+ 42"
6	Luke Durbridge (AUS)	Team BikeExchange–Jayco	+ 53"
7	Jonas Vingegaard (DEN)	Team Jumbo–Visma	+ 1' 12"
8	Damiano Caruso (ITA)	Team Bahrain Victorious	+ 1' 25"
9	Tao Geoghegan Hart (GBR)	INEOS Grenadiers	+ 1' 31"
10	Juan Ayuso (ESP)	UAE Team Emirates	+ 1' 34"

General classification after Stage 4
Rank	Rider	Team	Time
1	Wout van Aert (BEL)	Team Jumbo–Visma	13h 26' 06"
2	Mattia Cattaneo (ITA)	Quick-Step Alpha Vinyl Team	+ 53"
3	Primož Roglič (SLO)	Team Jumbo–Visma	+ 56"
4	Jonas Vingegaard (DEN)	Team Jumbo–Visma	+ 1' 26"
5	Ethan Hayter (GBR)	INEOS Grenadiers	+ 1' 26"
6	Damiano Caruso (ITA)	Team Bahrain Victorious	+ 1' 39"
7	Tao Geoghegan Hart (GBR)	INEOS Grenadiers	+ 1' 45"
8	Juan Ayuso (ESP)	UAE Team Emirates	+ 1' 48"
9	Matteo Jorgenson (USA)	Movistar Team	+ 1' 50"
10	Ben O'Connor (AUS)	AG2R Citroën Team	+ 2' 00"

=== Stage 5 ===
9 June 2022 — Thizy-les-Bourgs to Chaintré, 162.5 km (101.0 mi)

Stage 5 Result
Rank	Rider	Team	Time
1	Wout van Aert (BEL)	Team Jumbo–Visma	3h 38' 35"
2	Jordi Meeus (BEL)	Bora–Hansgrohe	+ 0"
3	Ethan Hayter (GBR)	INEOS Grenadiers	+ 0"
4	Edvald Boasson Hagen (NOR)	Team TotalEnergies	+ 0"
5	Hugo Page (FRA)	Intermarché–Wanty–Gobert Matériaux	+ 0"
6	Jasper Stuyven (BEL)	Trek–Segafredo	+ 0"
7	Andrea Bagioli (ITA)	Quick-Step Alpha Vinyl Team	+ 0"
8	Jan Bakelants (BEL)	Intermarché–Wanty–Gobert Matériaux	+ 0"
9	Matis Louvel (FRA)	Arkéa–Samsic	+ 0"
10	Sebastian Molano (COL)	UAE Team Emirates	+ 0"

General classification after Stage 5
Rank	Rider	Team	Time
1	Wout van Aert (BEL)	Team Jumbo–Visma	17h 04' 31"
2	Mattia Cattaneo (ITA)	Quick-Step Alpha Vinyl Team	+ 1' 03"
3	Primož Roglič (SLO)	Team Jumbo–Visma	+ 1' 06"
4	Ethan Hayter (GBR)	INEOS Grenadiers	+ 1' 32"
5	Jonas Vingegaard (DEN)	Team Jumbo–Visma	+ 1' 36"
6	Damiano Caruso (ITA)	Team Bahrain Victorious	+ 1' 49"
7	Tao Geoghegan Hart (GBR)	INEOS Grenadiers	+ 1' 55"
8	Juan Ayuso (ESP)	UAE Team Emirates	+ 1' 58"
9	Matteo Jorgenson (USA)	Movistar Team	+ 2' 00"
10	Ben O'Connor (AUS)	AG2R Citroën Team	+ 2' 10"

=== Stage 6 ===
10 June 2022 — Rives to Gap, 196.5 km (122.1 mi)

Stage 6 Result
Rank	Rider	Team	Time
1	Valentin Ferron (FRA)	Team TotalEnergies	4h 42' 17"
2	Pierre Rolland (FRA)	B&B Hotels–KTM	+ 3"
3	Warren Barguil (FRA)	Arkéa–Samsic	+ 3"
4	Andrea Bagioli (ITA)	Quick-Step Alpha Vinyl Team	+ 3"
5	Geoffrey Bouchard (FRA)	AG2R Citroën Team	+ 3"
6	Victor Lafay (FRA)	Cofidis	+ 3"
7	Edvald Boasson Hagen (NOR)	Team TotalEnergies	+ 32"
8	Dylan Groenewegen (NED)	Team BikeExchange–Jayco	+ 32"
9	Matis Louvel (FRA)	Arkéa–Samsic	+ 32"
10	Jordi Meeus (BEL)	Bora–Hansgrohe	+ 32"

General classification after Stage 6
Rank	Rider	Team	Time
1	Wout van Aert (BEL)	Team Jumbo–Visma	21h 47' 20"
2	Mattia Cattaneo (ITA)	Quick-Step Alpha Vinyl Team	+ 1' 03"
3	Primož Roglič (SLO)	Team Jumbo–Visma	+ 1' 06"
4	Ethan Hayter (GBR)	INEOS Grenadiers	+ 1' 32"
5	Jonas Vingegaard (DEN)	Team Jumbo–Visma	+ 1' 36"
6	Damiano Caruso (ITA)	Team Bahrain Victorious	+ 1' 49"
7	Tao Geoghegan Hart (GBR)	INEOS Grenadiers	+ 1' 55"
8	Matteo Jorgenson (USA)	Movistar Team	+ 2' 00"
9	Ben O'Connor (AUS)	AG2R Citroën Team	+ 2' 10"
10	Wilco Kelderman (NED)	Bora–Hansgrohe	+ 2' 12"

=== Stage 7 ===
11 June 2022 — Saint-Chaffrey to Vaujany, 135 km (84 mi)

Stage 7 Result
Rank	Rider	Team	Time
1	Carlos Verona (ESP)	Movistar Team	3h 53' 55"
2	Primož Roglič (SLO)	Team Jumbo–Visma	+ 12"
3	Jonas Vingegaard (DEN)	Team Jumbo–Visma	+ 25"
4	Ben O'Connor (AUS)	AG2R Citroën Team	+ 27"
5	Tobias Halland Johannessen (NOR)	Uno-X Pro Cycling Team	+ 39"
6	Esteban Chaves (COL)	EF Education–EasyPost	+ 40"
7	David Gaudu (FRA)	Groupama–FDJ	+ 40"
8	Louis Meintjes (RSA)	Intermarché–Wanty–Gobert Matériaux	+ 40"
9	Tao Geoghegan Hart (GBR)	INEOS Grenadiers	+ 48"
10	Jack Haig (AUS)	Team Bahrain Victorious	+ 56"

General classification after Stage 7
Rank	Rider	Team	Time
1	Primož Roglič (SLO)	Team Jumbo–Visma	25h 42' 28"
2	Jonas Vingegaard (DEN)	Team Jumbo–Visma	+ 44"
3	Ben O'Connor (AUS)	AG2R Citroën Team	+ 1' 24"
4	Tao Geoghegan Hart (GBR)	INEOS Grenadiers	+ 1' 30"
5	Damiano Caruso (ITA)	Team Bahrain Victorious	+ 1' 32"
6	David Gaudu (FRA)	Groupama–FDJ	+ 1' 40"
7	Tobias Halland Johannessen (NOR)	Uno-X Pro Cycling Team	+ 2' 05"
8	Matteo Jorgenson (USA)	Movistar Team	+ 2' 06"
9	Jack Haig (AUS)	Team Bahrain Victorious	+ 2' 12"
10	Louis Meintjes (RSA)	Intermarché–Wanty–Gobert Matériaux	+ 2' 16"

=== Stage 8 ===
12 June 2022 — Saint-Alban-Leysse to Plateau de Solaison, 137.5 km (85.4 mi)

Stage 8 Result
Rank	Rider	Team	Time
1	Jonas Vingegaard (DEN)	Team Jumbo–Visma	3h 49' 20"
2	Primož Roglič (SLO)	Team Jumbo–Visma	+ 0"
3	Ben O'Connor (AUS)	AG2R Citroën Team	+ 15"
4	Esteban Chaves (COL)	EF Education–EasyPost	+ 53"
5	Ruben Guerreiro (POR)	EF Education–EasyPost	+ 53"
6	Damiano Caruso (ITA)	Team Bahrain Victorious	+ 55"
7	Louis Meintjes (RSA)	Intermarché–Wanty–Gobert Matériaux	+ 55"
8	Jack Haig (AUS)	Team Bahrain Victorious	+ 55"
9	Steven Kruijswijk (NED)	Team Jumbo–Visma	+ 1' 20"
10	Tobias Halland Johannessen (NOR)	Uno-X Pro Cycling Team	+ 1' 40"

General classification after Stage 8
Rank	Rider	Team	Time
1	Primož Roglič (SLO)	Team Jumbo–Visma	29h 31' 42"
2	Jonas Vingegaard (DEN)	Team Jumbo–Visma	+ 40"
3	Ben O'Connor (AUS)	AG2R Citroën Team	+ 1' 41"
4	Damiano Caruso (ITA)	Team Bahrain Victorious	+ 2' 33"
5	Jack Haig (AUS)	Team Bahrain Victorious	+ 3' 13"
6	Louis Meintjes (RSA)	Intermarché–Wanty–Gobert Matériaux	+ 3' 17"
7	Esteban Chaves (COL)	EF Education–EasyPost	+ 3' 18"
8	Tao Geoghegan Hart (GBR)	INEOS Grenadiers	+ 3' 44"
9	Ruben Guerreiro (POR)	EF Education–EasyPost	+ 3' 48"
10	Tobias Halland Johannessen (NOR)	Uno-X Pro Cycling Team	+ 3' 51"

== Classification leadership table ==
Classification leadership by stage
Stage	Winner	General classification	Points classification	Mountains classification	Young rider classification	Team classification	Combativity award
1	Wout van Aert	Wout van Aert	Wout van Aert	Pierre Rolland	Ethan Hayter	EF Education–EasyPost	Pierre Rolland
2	Alexis Vuillermoz	Alexis Vuillermoz	Wout van Aert	Pierre Rolland	Kevin Vermaerke	Arkéa–Samsic	Alexis Vuillermoz
3	David Gaudu	Wout van Aert	Wout van Aert	Pierre Rolland	Matteo Jorgenson	Team Bahrain Victorious	Sebastian Schönberger
4	Filippo Ganna	Wout van Aert	Wout van Aert	Pierre Rolland	Ethan Hayter	Team Jumbo–Visma	Not awarded
5	Wout van Aert	Wout van Aert	Wout van Aert	Pierre Rolland	Ethan Hayter	Team Jumbo–Visma	Benjamin Thomas
6	Valentin Ferron	Wout van Aert	Wout van Aert	Pierre Rolland	Ethan Hayter	Team Jumbo–Visma	Geoffrey Bouchard
7	Carlos Verona	Primož Roglič	Wout van Aert	Pierre Rolland	Tobias Halland Johannessen	Team Jumbo–Visma	Carlos Verona
8	Jonas Vingegaard	Primož Roglič	Wout van Aert	Pierre Rolland	Tobias Halland Johannessen	Team Jumbo–Visma	Michael Storer
Final		Primož Roglič	Wout van Aert	Pierre Rolland	Tobias Halland Johannessen	Team Jumbo–Visma	

- On stage 2, Sean Quinn, who was third in the points classification, wore the green jersey, because first placed Wout van Aert wore the yellow jersey as the leader of the general classification and second placed Ethan Hayter wore the white jersey as the leader of the young rider classification. On stages 5, 6 and 7, Kevin Vermaerke, Hugo Page and Edvald Boasson Hagen respectively wore the green jersey for the same reason.
- On stage 4, Ethan Hayter, who was second in the points classification, wore the green jersey, because first placed Wout van Aert wore the yellow jersey as the leader of the general classification.

== Final classification standings ==
Legend
Denotes the leader of the general classification	Denotes the leader of the young rider classification
Denotes the leader of the points classification	Denotes the leader of the team classification
Denotes the leader of the mountains classification	Denotes the winner of the combativity award

=== General classification ===
General classification after stage 8 (1–10)
Rank	Rider	Team	Time
1	Primož Roglič (SLO)	Team Jumbo–Visma	29h 31' 42"
2	Jonas Vingegaard (DEN)	Team Jumbo–Visma	+ 40"
3	Ben O'Connor (AUS)	AG2R Citroën Team	+ 1' 41"
4	Damiano Caruso (ITA)	Team Bahrain Victorious	+ 2' 33"
5	Jack Haig (AUS)	Team Bahrain Victorious	+ 3' 13"
6	Louis Meintjes (RSA)	Intermarché–Wanty–Gobert Matériaux	+ 3' 17"
7	Esteban Chaves (COL)	EF Education–EasyPost	+ 3' 18"
8	Tao Geoghegan Hart (GBR)	INEOS Grenadiers	+ 3' 44"
9	Ruben Guerreiro (POR)	EF Education–EasyPost	+ 3' 48"
10	Tobias Halland Johannessen (NOR)	Uno-X Pro Cycling Team	+ 3' 51"

=== Points classification ===
Points classification after stage 8 (1–10)
Rank	Rider	Team	Points
1	Wout van Aert (BEL)	Team Jumbo–Visma	88
2	Ethan Hayter (GBR)	INEOS Grenadiers	74
3	Edvald Boasson Hagen (NOR)	Team TotalEnergies	46
4	Hugo Page (FRA)	Intermarché–Wanty–Gobert Matériaux	44
5	Pierre Rolland (FRA)	B&B Hotels–KTM	36
6	Valentin Ferron (FRA)	Team TotalEnergies	31
7	Warren Barguil (FRA)	Arkéa–Samsic	30
8	Primož Roglič (SLO)	Team Jumbo–Visma	30
9	Andrea Bagioli (ITA)	Quick-Step Alpha Vinyl Team	30
10	Jonas Vingegaard (DEN)	Team Jumbo–Visma	29

=== Mountains classification ===
Mountains classification after stage 8 (1–10)
Rank	Rider	Team	Points
1	Pierre Rolland (FRA)	B&B Hotels–KTM	71
2	Carlos Verona (ESP)	Movistar Team	21
3	Victor Lafay (FRA)	Cofidis	19
4	Jonas Vingegaard (DEN)	Team Jumbo–Visma	17
5	Primož Roglič (SLO)	Team Jumbo–Visma	15
6	Kenny Elissonde (FRA)	Trek–Segafredo	14
7	Laurens Huys (BEL)	Intermarché–Wanty–Gobert Matériaux	14
8	Michael Storer (AUS)	Groupama–FDJ	12
9	Matteo Fabbro (ITA)	Bora–Hansgrohe	12
10	Laurens De Plus (BEL)	INEOS Grenadiers	11

=== Young rider classification ===
Young rider classification after stage 8 (1–10)
Rank	Rider	Team	Time
1	Tobias Halland Johannessen (NOR)	Uno-X Pro Cycling Team	29h 15' 13"
2	Brandon McNulty (USA)	UAE Team Emirates	+ 1' 06"
3	Matteo Jorgenson (USA)	Movistar Team	+ 3' 15"
4	Ethan Hayter (GBR)	INEOS Grenadiers	+ 4' 15"
5	Andrea Bagioli (ITA)	Quick-Step Alpha Vinyl Team	+ 4' 50"
6	Simon Guglielmi (FRA)	Arkéa–Samsic	+ 14' 05"
7	Kevin Vermaerke (USA)	Team DSM	+ 14' 50"
8	Kevin Geniets (LUX)	Groupama–FDJ	+ 15' 06"
9	Mark Donovan (GBR)	Team DSM	+ 19' 28"
10	Michael Storer (AUS)	Groupama–FDJ	+ 19' 10"

=== Team classification ===
Team classification after stage 8 (1–10)
Rank	Team	Time
1	(Netherlands) Team Jumbo–Visma	87h 38' 30"
2	Team Bahrain Victorious	+ 13' 40"
3	(United Kingdom) INEOS Grenadiers	+ 22' 56"
4	(Belgium) Intermarché–Wanty–Gobert Matériaux	+ 23' 39"
5	(Spain) Movistar Team	+ 35' 37"
6	(France) Groupama–FDJ	+ 35' 47"
7	(France) AG2R Citroën Team	+ 36' 33"
8	(United States) Trek–Segafredo	+ 42' 00"
9	(United States) EF Education–EasyPost	+ 43' 46"
10	(Germany) Bora–Hansgrohe	+ 45' 29"

== Notes ==
^{a} As of 1 March 2022, the UCI announced that cyclists from Russia and Belarus would no longer compete under the name or flag of those respective countries due to the Russian invasion of Ukraine.
