= Pouilly =

Pouilly may refer to:

- Pouilly, Moselle, a commune in the Moselle department, France
- Pouilly, Oise, a commune in the Oise department, France

It can also refer to

- Pouilly-sur-Loire, a commune in the Nièvre department in central France
  - Pouilly Fumé, a white wine produced in Pouilly-sur-Loire
  - Pouilly-sur-Loire AOC, an Appellation d'Origine Contrôlée in Pouilly-sur-Loire
- Three white wines from the Mâconnais district of Burgundy, France:
  - Pouilly-Fuissé
  - Pouilly-Loché
  - Pouilly-Vinzelles
