= Rock of Vergisson =

Roche de Vergisson
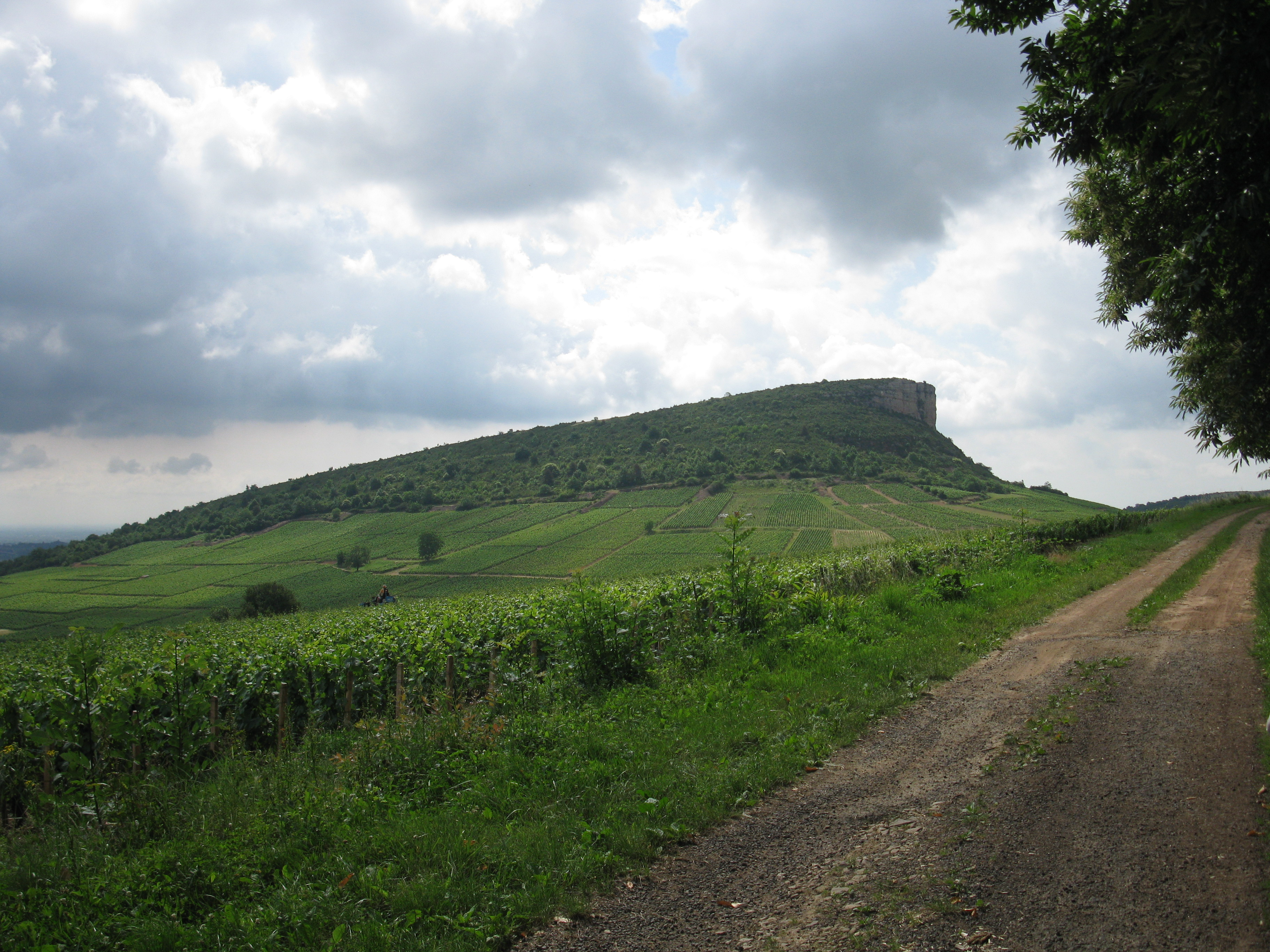
- La Roche de Vergisson

Highest point
- Elevation: 485 m (1,591 ft)
- Coordinates: 46°18′51″N 4°42′58″E

Geography
- Location within France
- Location: France
- Parent range: Monts du Mâconnais

The Rock of Vergisson is a limestone peak in Saône-et-Loire, France.

== Geography ==
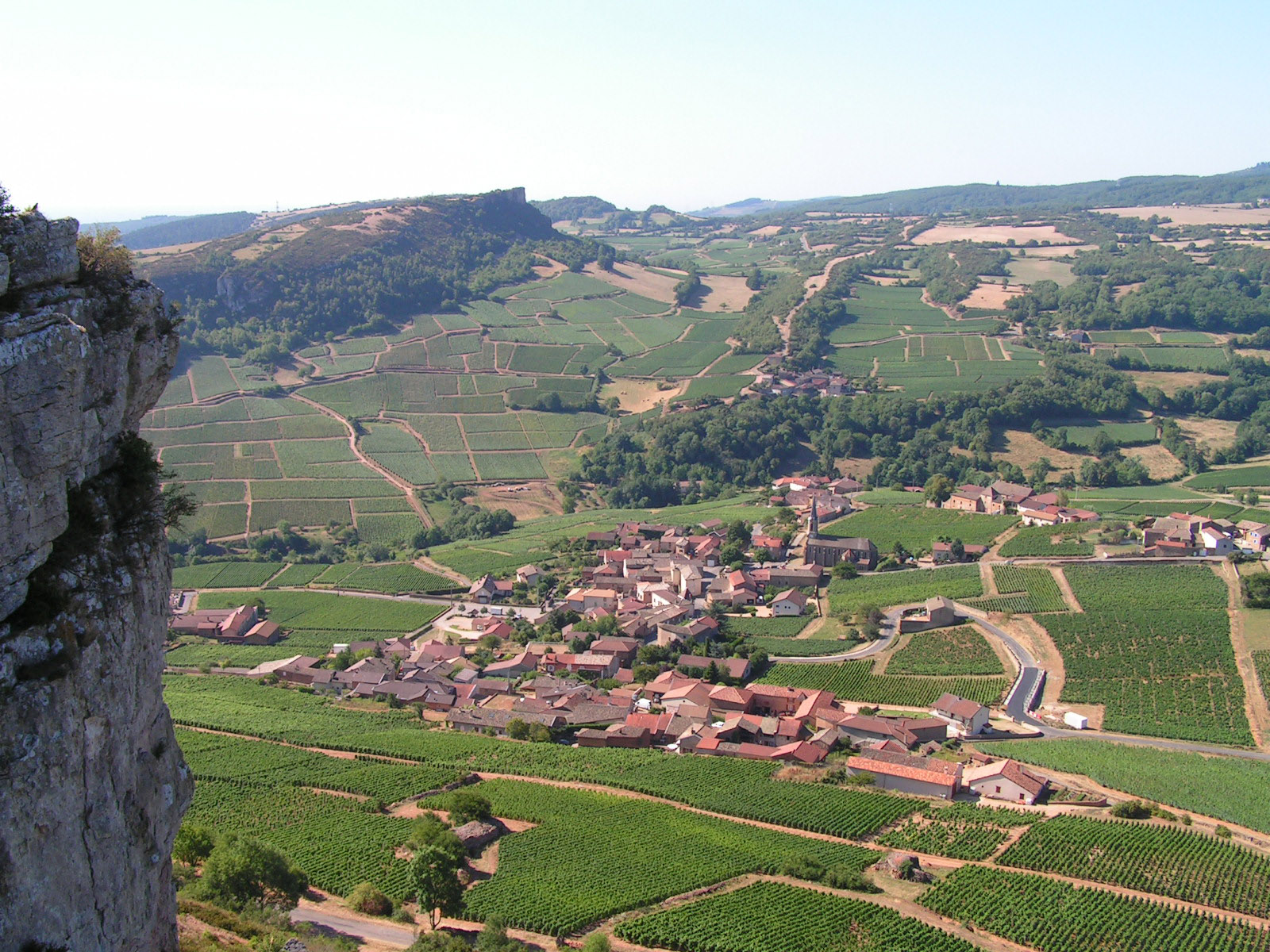
Southern view from the Rock of Vergisson. The more distant Rock of Solutré is seen on the sky-line a little left of center.

The Rock of Vergisson is a sharp escarpment located in the commune of Vergisson in Saône-et-Loire, in the south of Bourgogne. It is less than 2 km as the crow flies from the Rock of Solutré. It is 487 metres high, about 8 metres shorter than its neighbour.

=== Geology and history ===
The Rock of Vergisson has the same geological origins as the Rock of Solutré: a coral plateau from the Mesozoic era, raised and tilted from the east during the Cenozoic era, and exposed by differential erosion.

During prehistoric times, the rock was a site of human habitation, while the neighboring Rock of Solutré was a hunting site.

== Activity ==
=== Viticulture ===
Vineyards enclosed by dry stone walls (French: murgers) can be found on the slopes of the rock, producing wines of the Pouilly-Fuissé and Mâcon-Vergisson denominations.

=== Environmental protection ===
The area including the Rocks of Solutré and Vergisson and Mont Pouilly has been classified as a site naturel et rural since 1955.

=== Sport ===
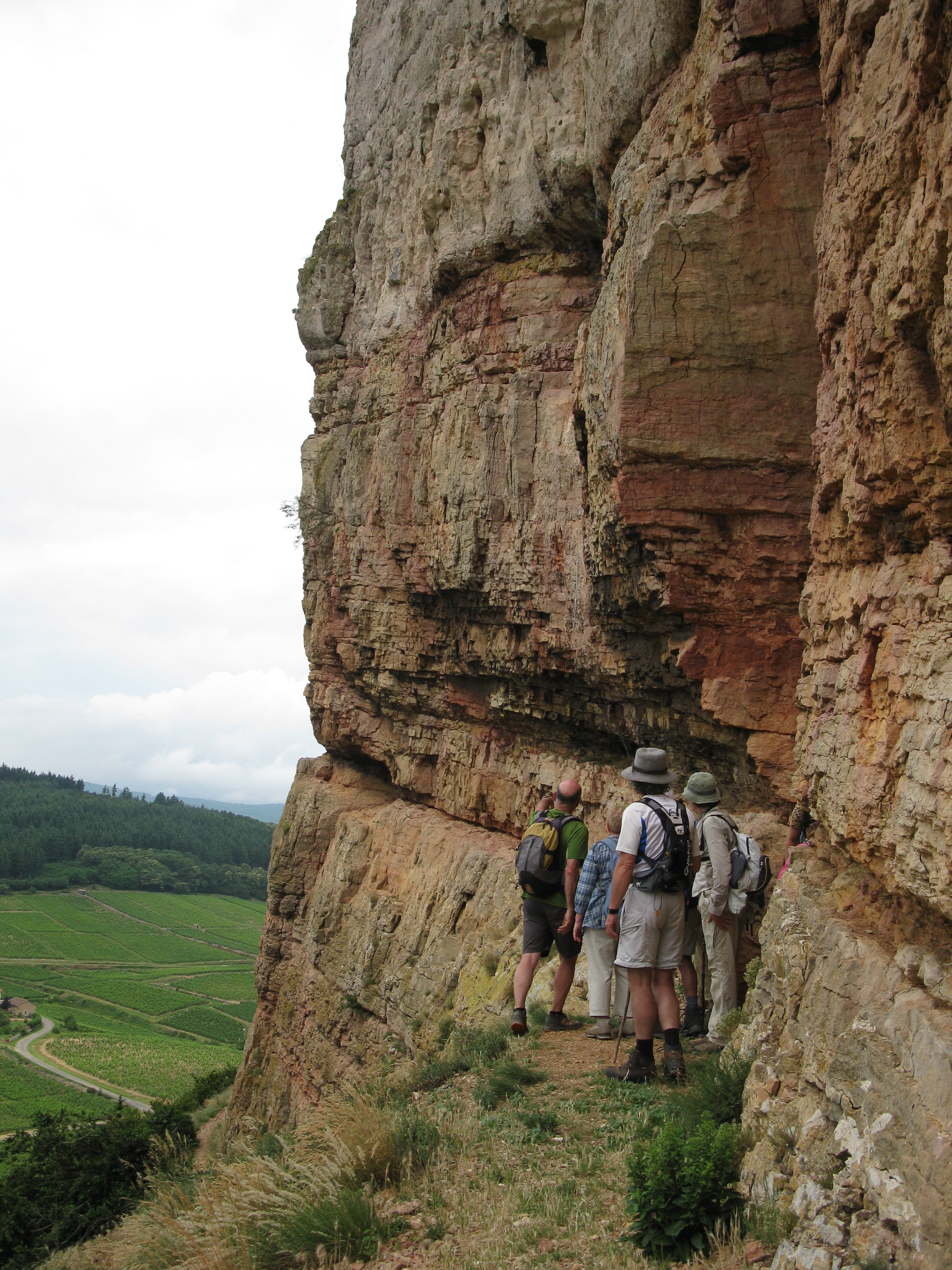
Trail climbing on the Rock of Vergisson

The limestone cliffs of the rocks are, along with the cliff at Remigny, one of the two most important sites for climbing in the departement, with at least 122 identified routes. Every year, the Randonnée des deux Roches (Walk of the Two Tocks) takes place, which runs from Solutré to Vergisson. In 1992, François Mitterrand decided to climb the Rock of Vergisson to escape from journalists.

The rocks of Solutré and Vergisson were described by Alphonse de Lamartine as deux navires pétrifiés surplombant une mer de vignes (two petrified ships overlooking a sea of vineyards).
