= Saint-Germain-Laprade =

- Commune
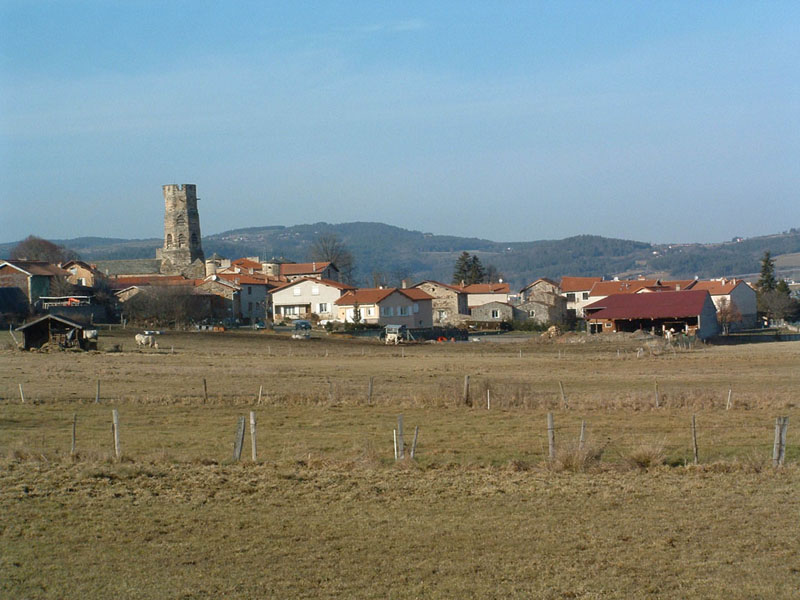
- Location of Saint-Germain-Laprade
- Location within France Location within Auvergne-Rhône-Alpes
- Coordinates: 45°02′20″N 3°58′12″E
- Country: France
- Region: Auvergne-Rhône-Alpes
- Department: Haute-Loire
- Arrondissement: Le Puy-en-Velay
- Canton: Le Puy-en-Velay-3
- Intercommunality: CA du Puy-en-Velay

Government
  - Mayor (2021–2026): Guy Chapelle
- Area^{1}: 28.09 km^{2} (10.85 sq mi)
- Elevation: 672 m (2,205 ft)
- Highest elevation: 920 m (3,020 ft)
- Lowest elevation: 601 m (1,972 ft)
- Population (2023): 3,432
  - Density: 122.2/km^{2} (316.4/sq mi)
- Time zone: UTC+01:00 (CET)
  - Summer (DST): UTC+02:00 (CEST)
- INSEE/Postal code: 43190 /43700
- ^{1} French Land Register data, which excludes lakes, ponds, glaciers > 1 km^{2} (0.386 sq mi or 247 acres) and river estuaries.

Saint-Germain-Laprade (French pronunciation: [sɛ̃ ʒɛʁmɛ̃ lapʁad]; Occitan: Sent German de la Prada) is a commune in the Haute-Loire department in south-central France.

== Population ==
Historical population

Year	Pop.	±% p.a.
1793	2,118	—
1821	2,334	+0.35%
1846	2,610	+0.45%
1872	2,620	+0.01%
1901	1,821	−1.25%
1926	1,512	−0.74%
1946	1,224	−1.05%
1962	1,135	−0.47%
1968	1,166	+0.45%

Year	Pop.	±% p.a.
1975	1,491	+3.57%
1982	2,169	+5.50%
1990	2,739	+2.96%
1999	2,992	+0.99%
2007	3,354	+1.44%
2012	3,471	+0.69%
2017	3,634	+0.92%
2023	3,432	−0.95%

Source: EHESS and INSEE (1968-2023)

== See also ==
- Communes of the Haute-Loire department
