= Vinzelles, Saône-et-Loire =

Vinzelles
- Commune
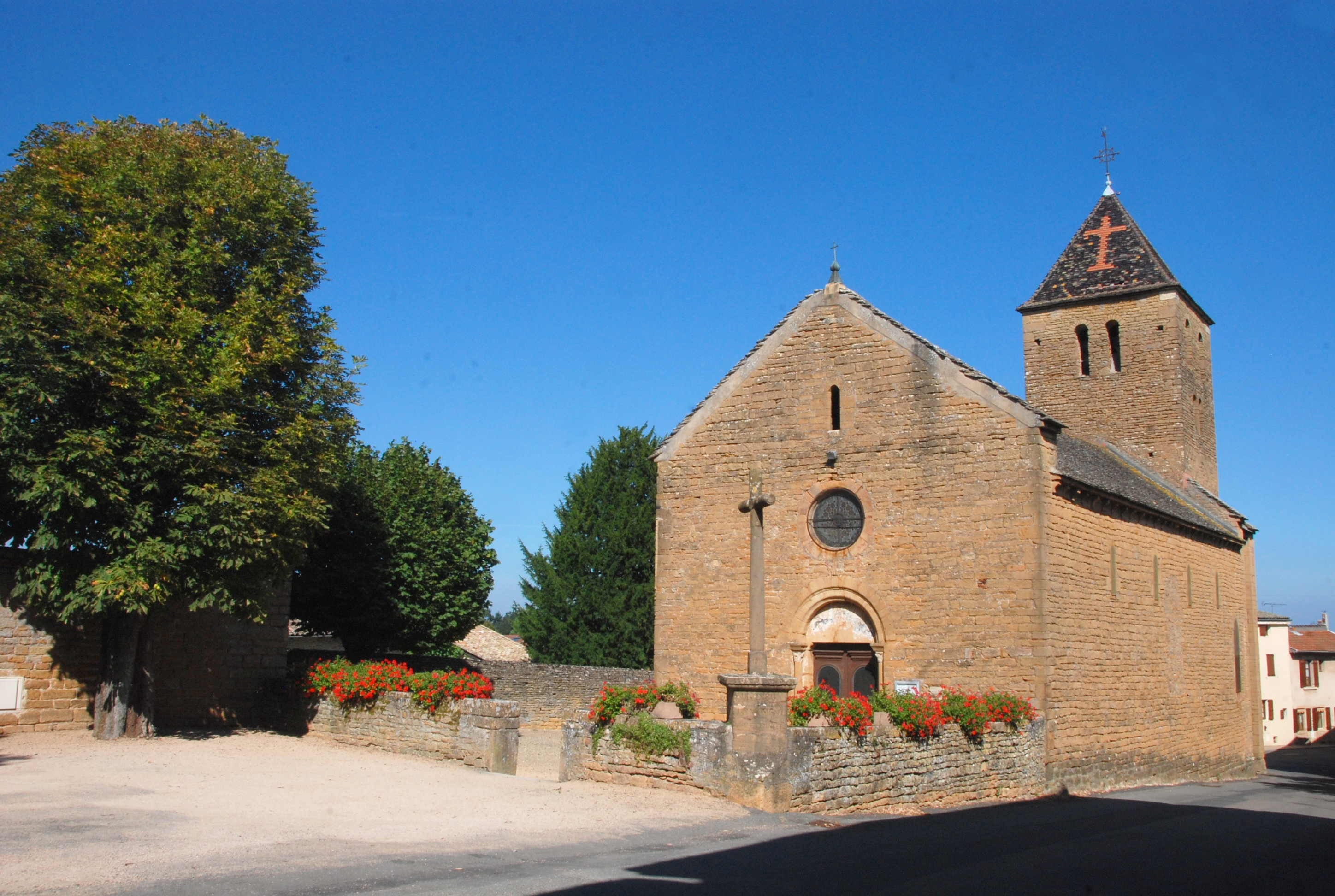
- The church in Vinzelles
- Location of Vinzelles
- Location within France Location within Bourgogne-Franche-Comté
- Coordinates: 46°16′22″N 4°46′09″E
- Country: France
- Region: Bourgogne-Franche-Comté
- Department: Saône-et-Loire
- Arrondissement: Mâcon
- Canton: La Chapelle-de-Guinchay
- Intercommunality: Mâconnais Beaujolais Agglomération
- Area^{1}: 4.43 km^{2} (1.71 sq mi)
- Elevation: 225 m (738 ft)
- Highest elevation: 303 m (994 ft)
- Lowest elevation: 170 m (560 ft)
- Population (2023): 758
  - Density: 171/km^{2} (443/sq mi)
- Time zone: UTC+01:00 (CET)
  - Summer (DST): UTC+02:00 (CEST)
- INSEE/Postal code: 71583 /71680
- ^{1} French Land Register data, which excludes lakes, ponds, glaciers > 1 km^{2} (0.386 sq mi or 247 acres) and river estuaries.

Vinzelles (French pronunciation: [vɛ̃zɛl]) is a commune in the Saône-et-Loire department in the region of Bourgogne-Franche-Comté in eastern France.

== Wine ==
Vineyards of Vinzelles are part of the appellation d'origine contrôlée Pouilly-Vinzelles, which is used for white wines from Chardonnay grapes.

== See also ==
- Communes of the Saône-et-Loire department
