= Carlos Verona =

Spanish cyclist

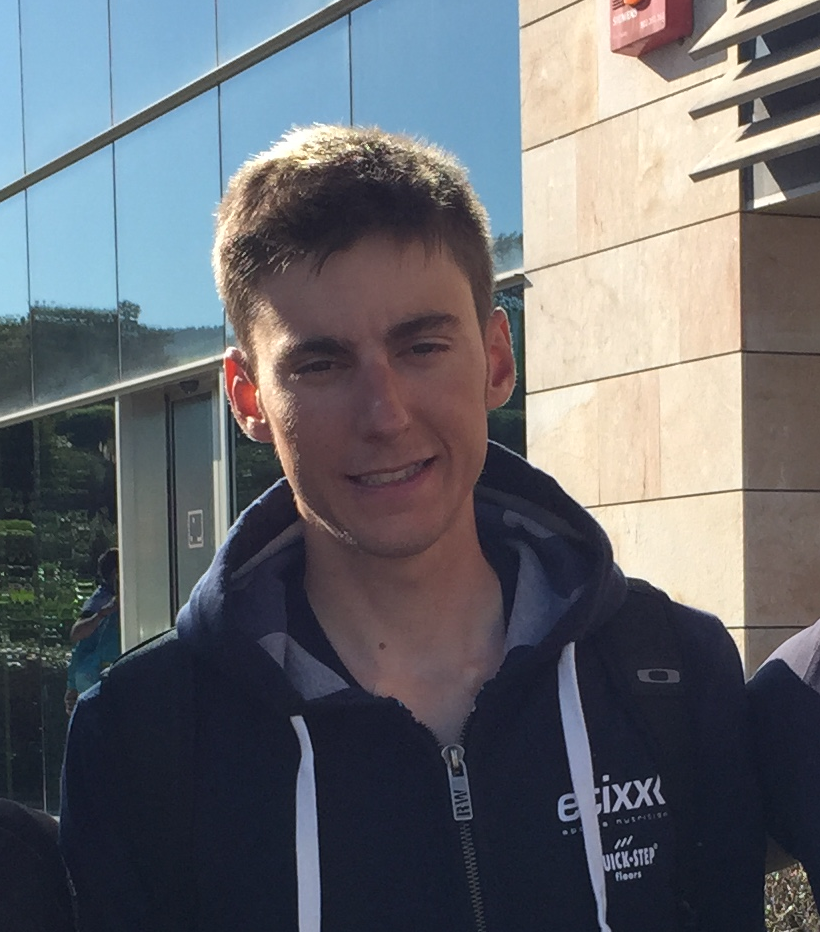
- Verona at the 2015 Vuelta a España.

Personal information
- Full name: Carlos Verona Quintanilla
- Nickname: Patikas
- Born: 4 November 1992 (age 33) San Lorenzo de El Escorial, Madrid, Spain
- Height: 1.86 m (6 ft 1 in)
- Weight: 68 kg (150 lb; 10 st 10 lb)

Cycling career
- Sport: Cycling
- Current team: Lidl–Trek
- Discipline: Road
- Role: Rider
- Rider type: Climber

Amateur team
- 2010: Cajamar-Almería

Professional teams
- 2011–2012: Burgos 2016–Castilla y León
- 2013–2016: Omega Pharma–Quick-Step
- 2016–2018: Orica–BikeExchange
- 2019–2023: Movistar Team
- 2024–: Lidl–Trek

Major wins
- Grand Tours Giro d’Italia 1 individual stage (2025)

Carlos Verona Quintanilla (born 4 November 1992) is a Spanish cyclist who currently rides for UCI WorldTeam Lidl–Trek. He was named in the start list for the 2016 Giro d'Italia.

== Career ==
Verona was born in San Lorenzo de El Escorial, Madrid. On 30 July 2016, Orica–BikeExchange announced the signing of Verona who would join the team for the remainder of the 2016 season as well as the 2017 and 2018 seasons. In July 2019, he was named in the startlist for the 2019 Tour de France.

Verona claimed his first stage win as a professional in the 2022 Critérium du Dauphiné; on the seventh stage, after being a part of a breakaway initially containing 29 riders, he attacked the group and rode to victory. He was the only rider to finish ahead of General Classification leader Primož Roglič on the stage.

== Major results ==
2009
3rd Road race, National Junior Road Championships
2010
2nd Time trial, National Junior Road Championships
5th Overall Vuelta Al Besaya
2011
6th Overall Tour des Pays de Savoie
7th Overall Vuelta a la Comunidad de Madrid Under-23
7th Overall Cinturó de l'Empordà
2012
1st Mountains classification, Vuelta Ciclista a León
9th Overall Toscana-Terra di Ciclismo
2013
8th Japan Cup
2015
Combativity award Stage 10 Vuelta a España
2017
4th GP Miguel Induráin
8th Overall Volta a Catalunya
2018
1st Mountains classification, Tour of the Basque Country
1st Mountains classification, Tour des Fjords
2nd GP Miguel Induráin
5th Overall Tour of Guangxi
2019
5th GP Miguel Induráin
10th Gran Piemonte
2021
9th Mont Ventoux Dénivelé Challenge
2022 (1 pro win)
1st Stage 7 Critérium du Dauphiné
6th Overall UAE Tour
7th Mont Ventoux Dénivelé Challenge
2023
10th Overall Tour of Oman
10th Muscat Classic
2024
9th Overall UAE Tour
2025 (1)
1st Stage 15 Giro d'Italia
2026
2nd Andorra MoraBanc Clàssica

=== Grand Tour general classification results timeline ===
Grand Tour	2014	2015	2016	2017	2018	2019	2020	2021	2022	2023	2024	2025	2026
Giro d'Italia	—	—	43	57	—	—	—	—	—	49	—	54	—
Tour de France	—	—	—	—	—	105	19	101	27	—	24	—	23
Vuelta a España	66	29	—	73	—	—	30	DNF	—	—	32	60	

Legend
—	Did not compete
DNF	Did not finish
