= Vergisson =

- Commune
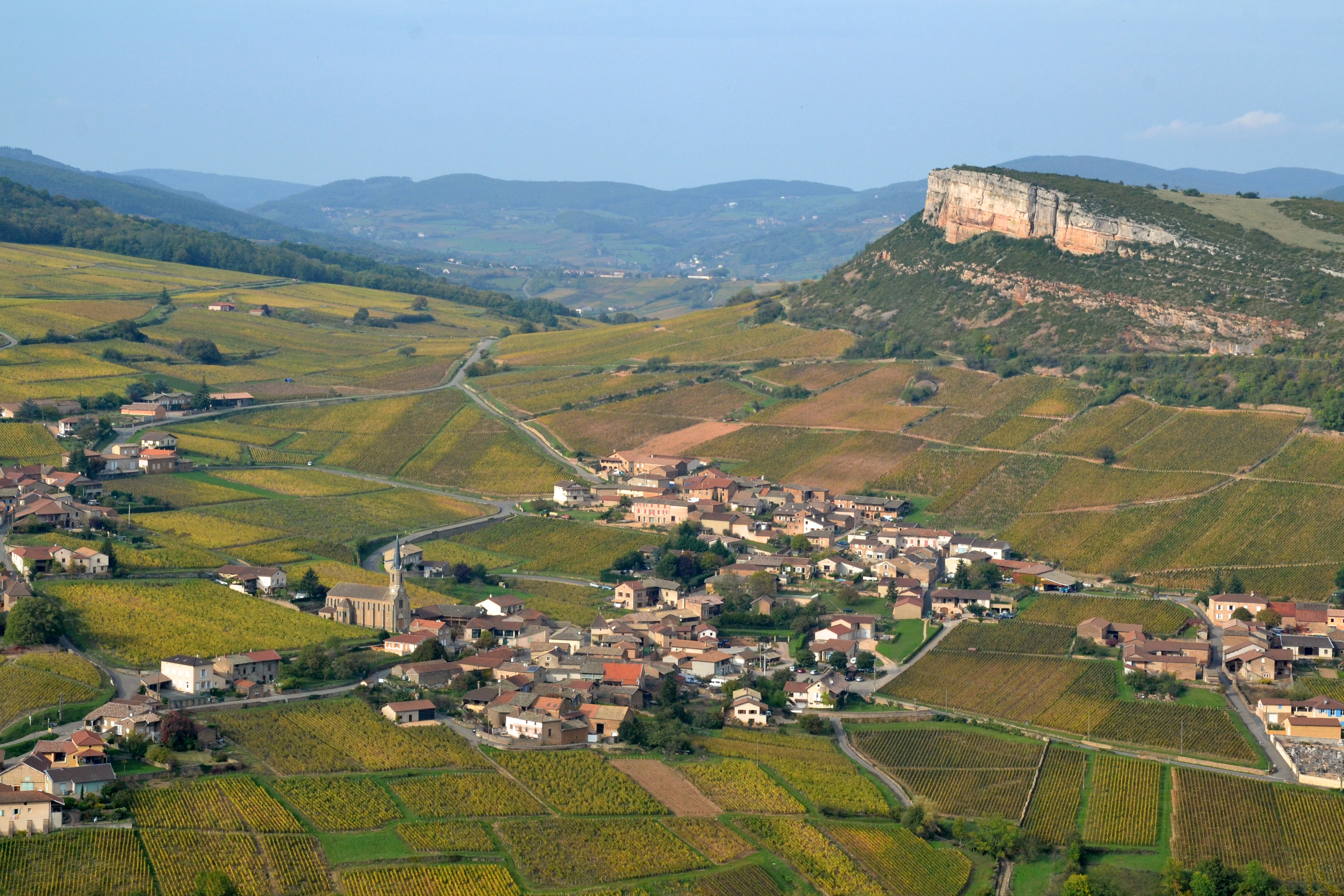
- A general view of Vergisson

- Coat of arms
- Location of Vergisson
- Location within France Location within Bourgogne-Franche-Comté
- Coordinates: 46°18′32″N 4°42′55″E
- Country: France
- Region: Bourgogne-Franche-Comté
- Department: Saône-et-Loire
- Arrondissement: Mâcon
- Canton: La Chapelle-de-Guinchay
- Intercommunality: Mâconnais Beaujolais Agglomération
- Area^{1}: 5.77 km^{2} (2.23 sq mi)
- Elevation: 320 m (1,050 ft)
- Highest elevation: 575 m (1,886 ft)
- Lowest elevation: 255 m (837 ft)
- Population (2023): 222
  - Density: 38.5/km^{2} (99.6/sq mi)
- Time zone: UTC+01:00 (CET)
  - Summer (DST): UTC+02:00 (CEST)
- INSEE/Postal code: 71567 /71960
- ^{1} French Land Register data, which excludes lakes, ponds, glaciers > 1 km^{2} (0.386 sq mi or 247 acres) and river estuaries.

Vergisson (French pronunciation: [vɛʁʒisɔ̃]) is a commune in the Saône-et-Loire department in the region of Bourgogne-Franche-Comté in eastern France.

== Wine ==
The vineyards of Vergisson form part of the appellation d'origine contrôlée Pouilly-Fuissé.

== Gallery ==
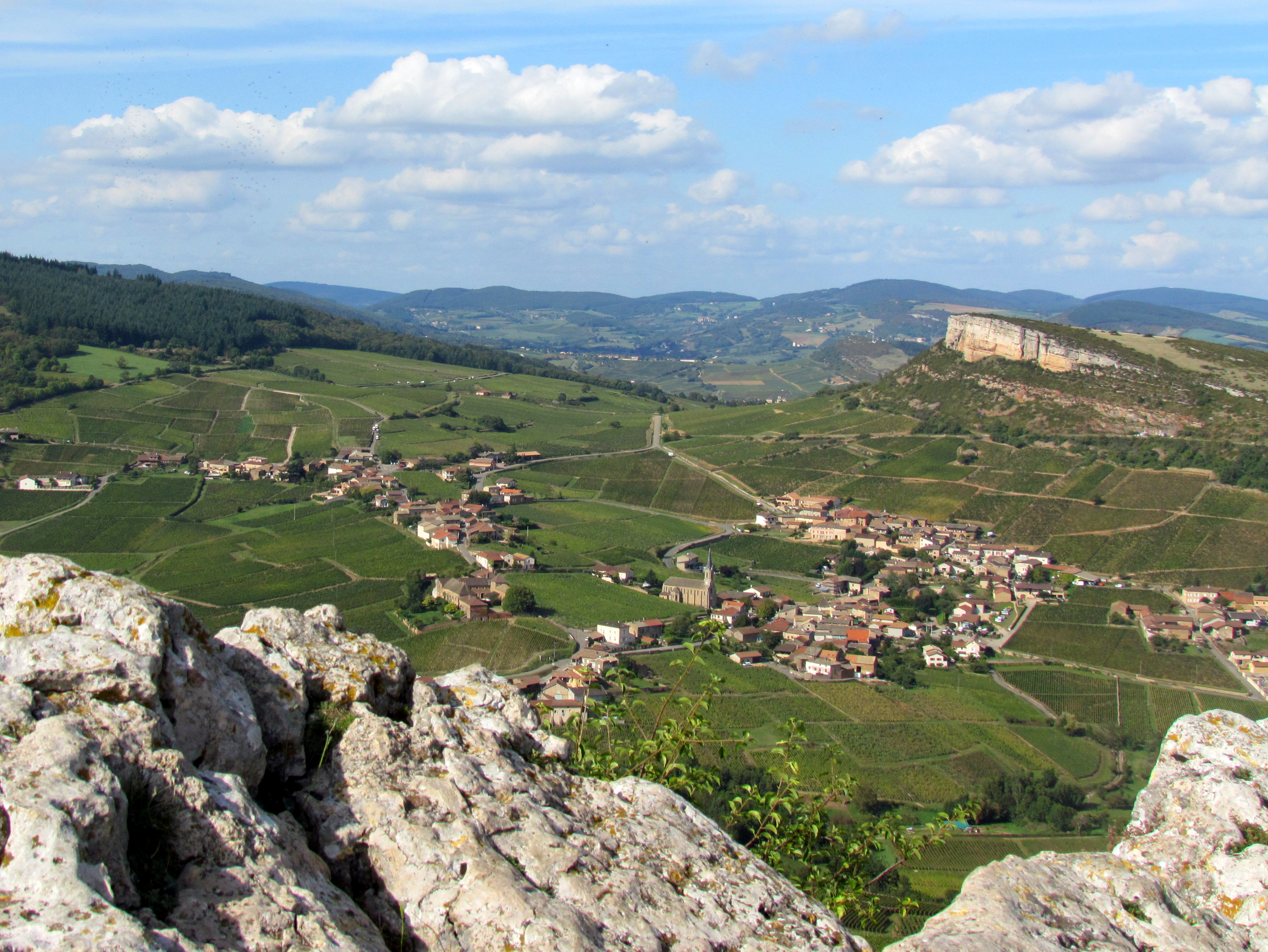
View from Rock of Solutré.

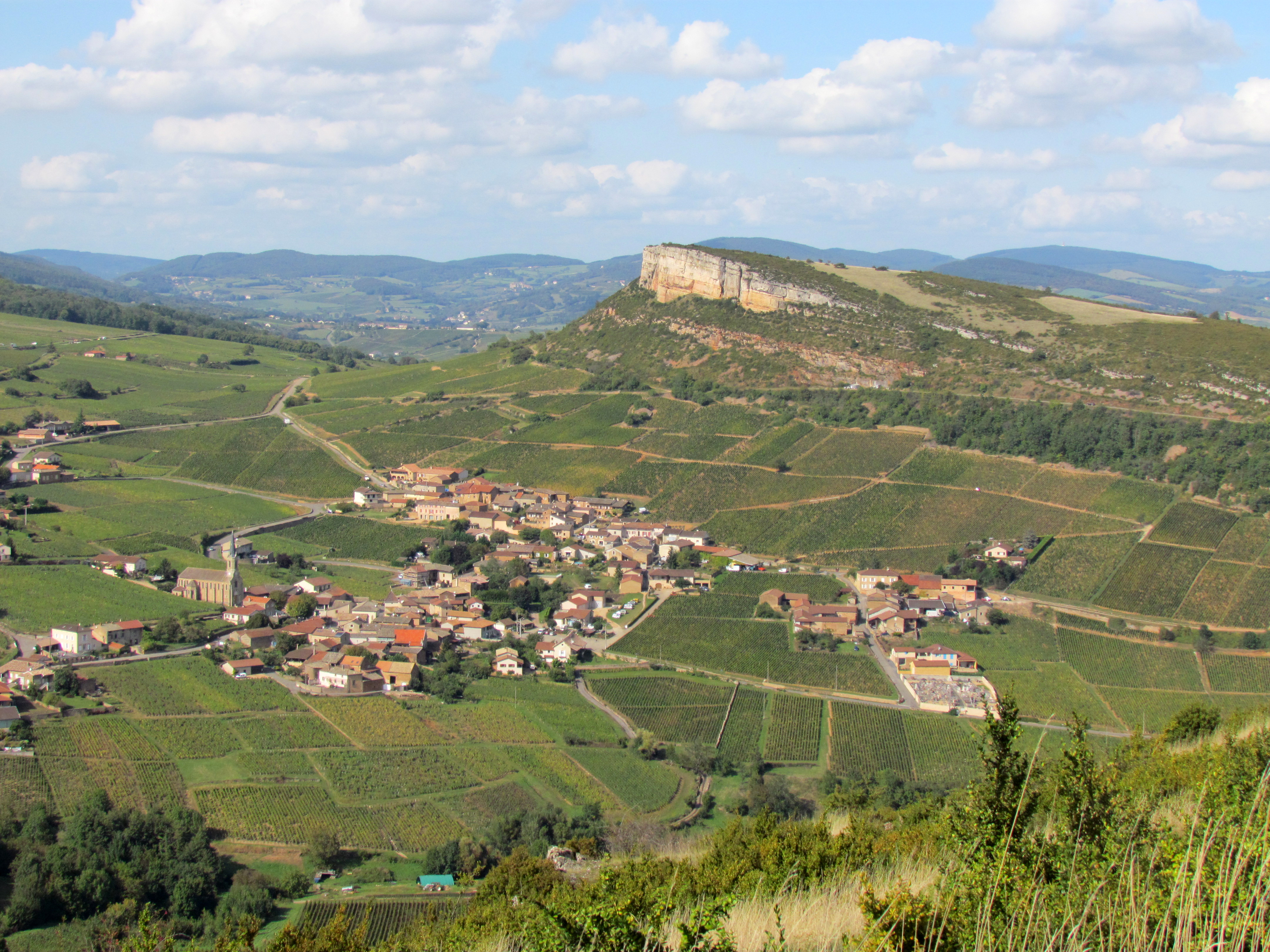
View from Rock of Vergisson.

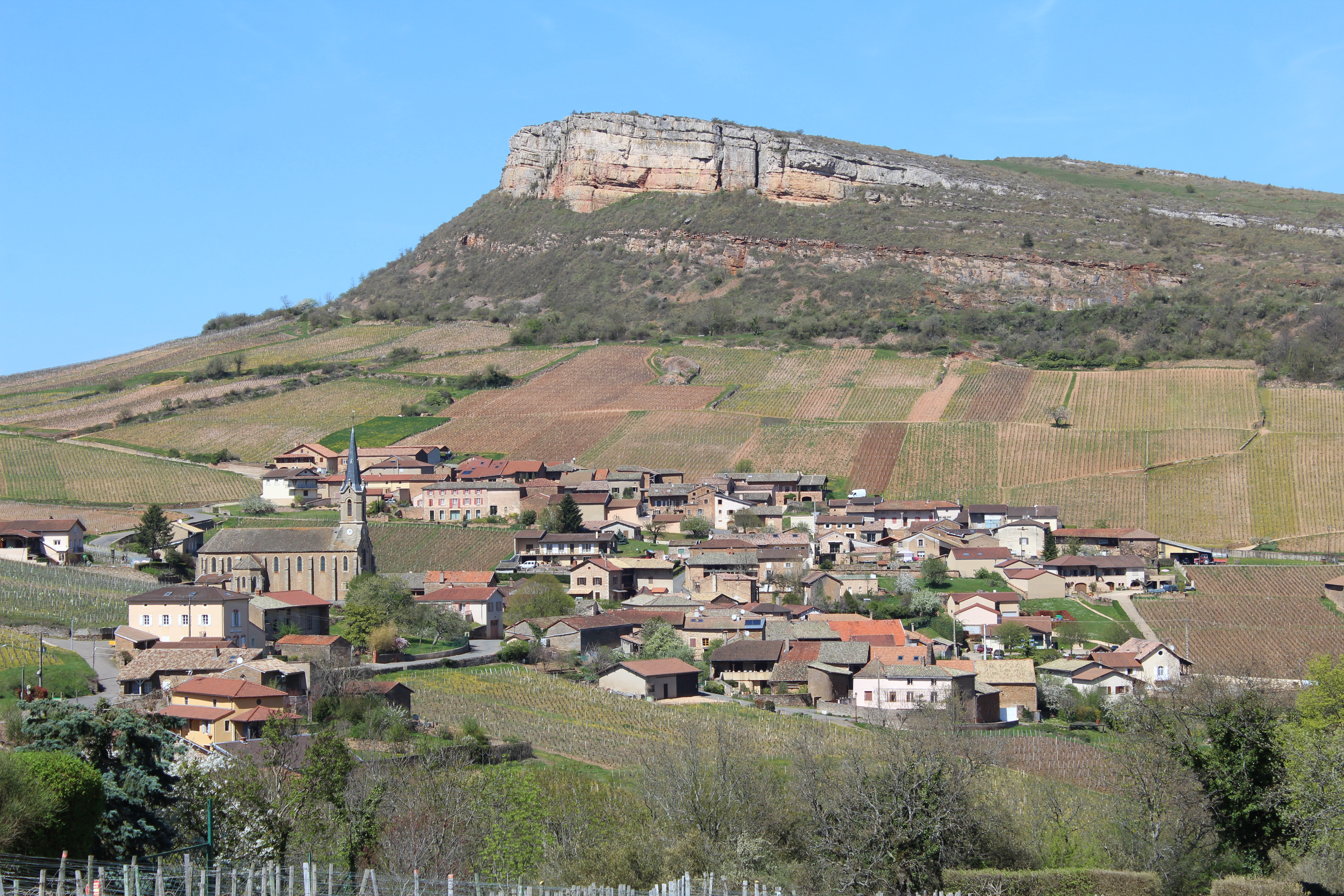
View from Menhir de Chancerons.

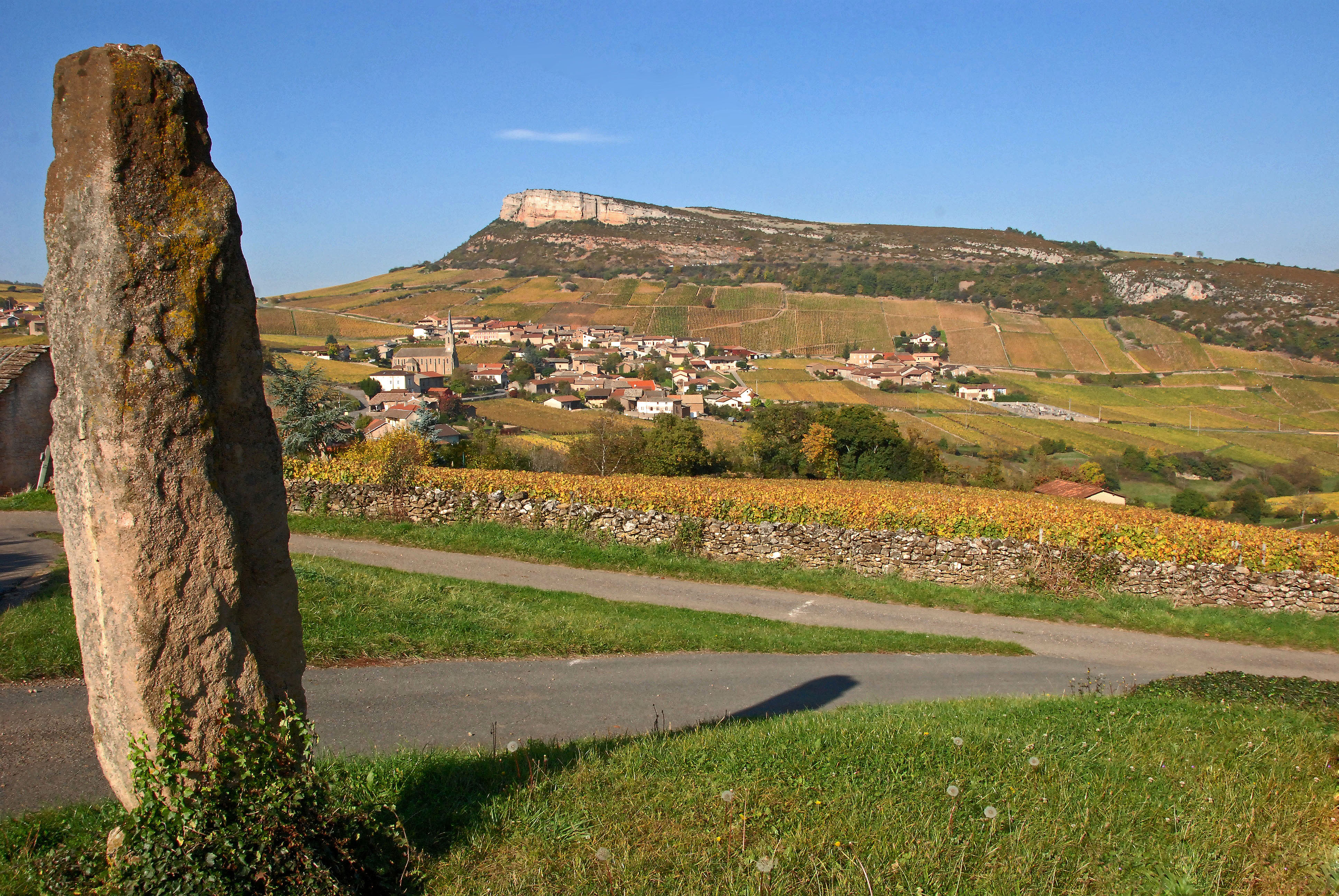
Menhir de Chancerons.

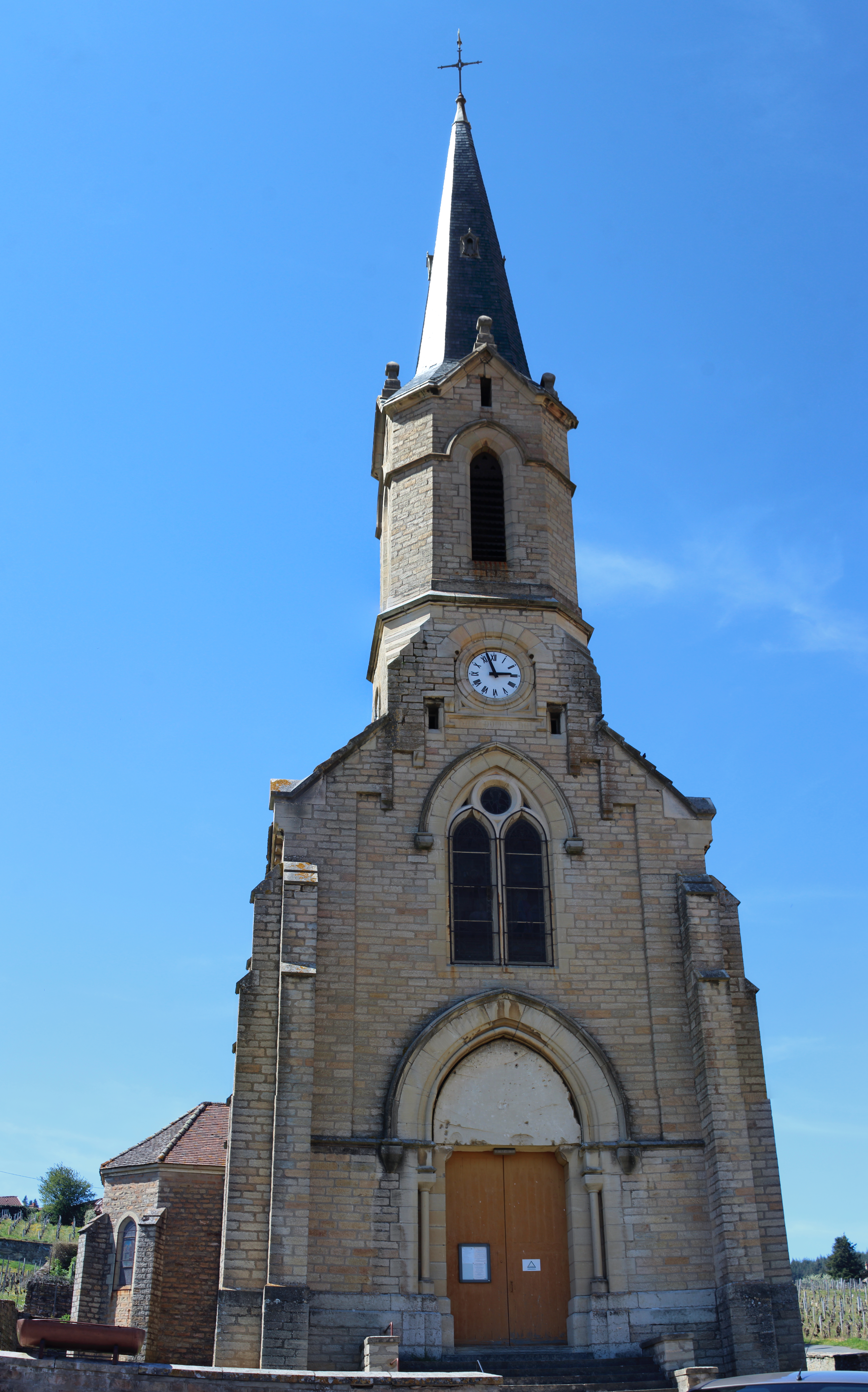
Église Saint-Martin.

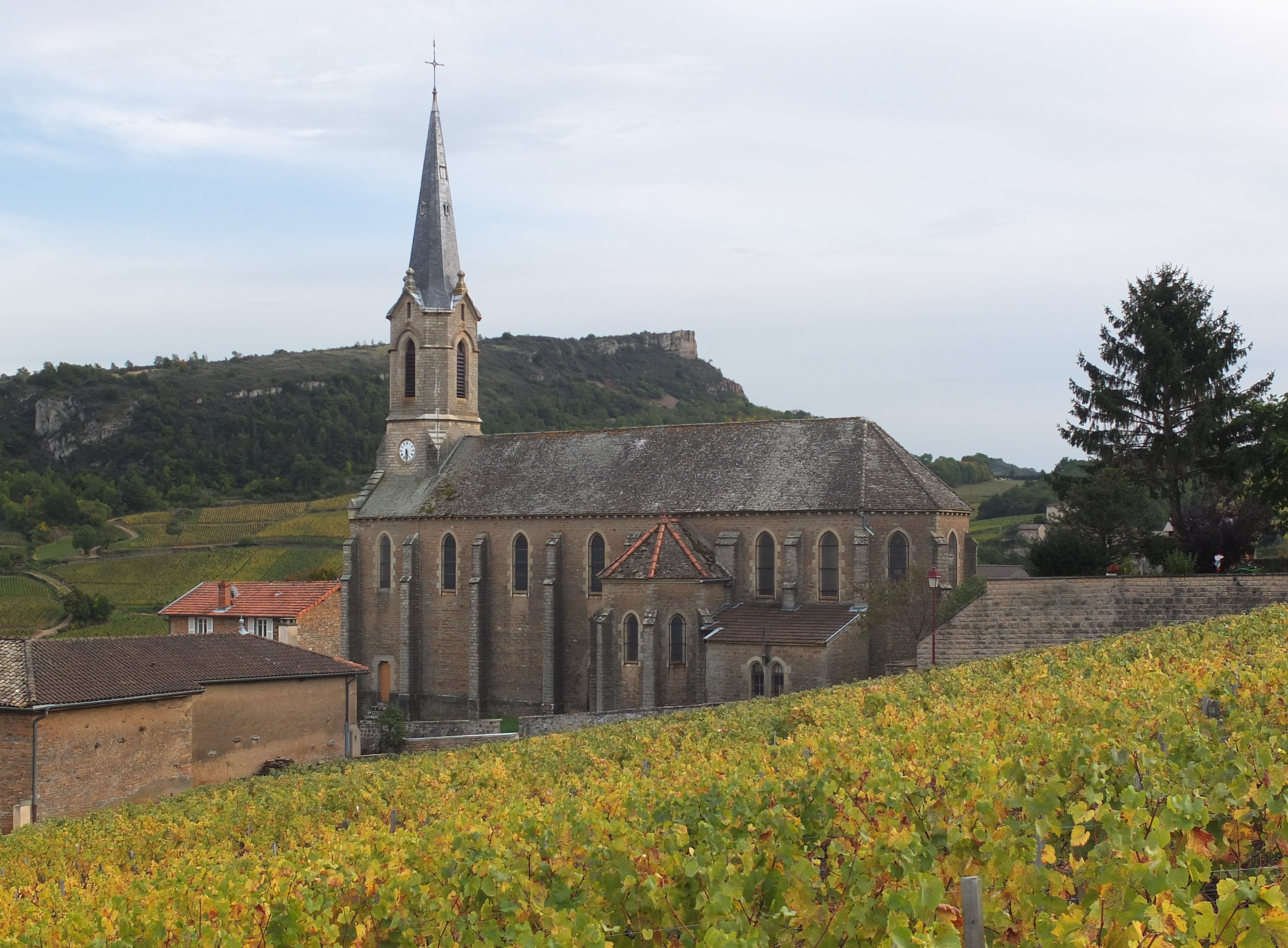
Église Saint-Martin (view N).

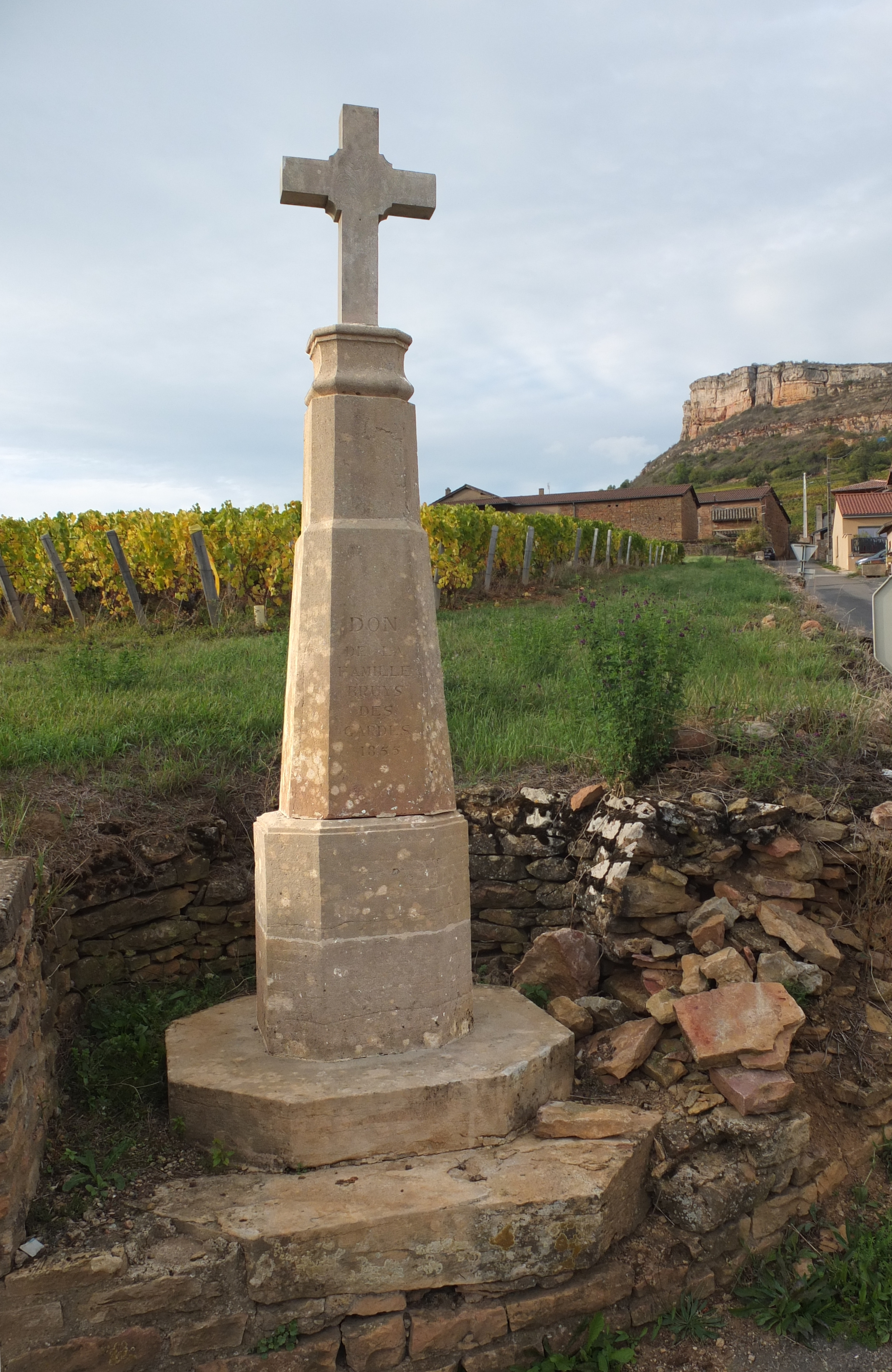
Wayside cross (1855).

== See also ==
- Communes of the Saône-et-Loire department
