= Fuissé =

- Commune
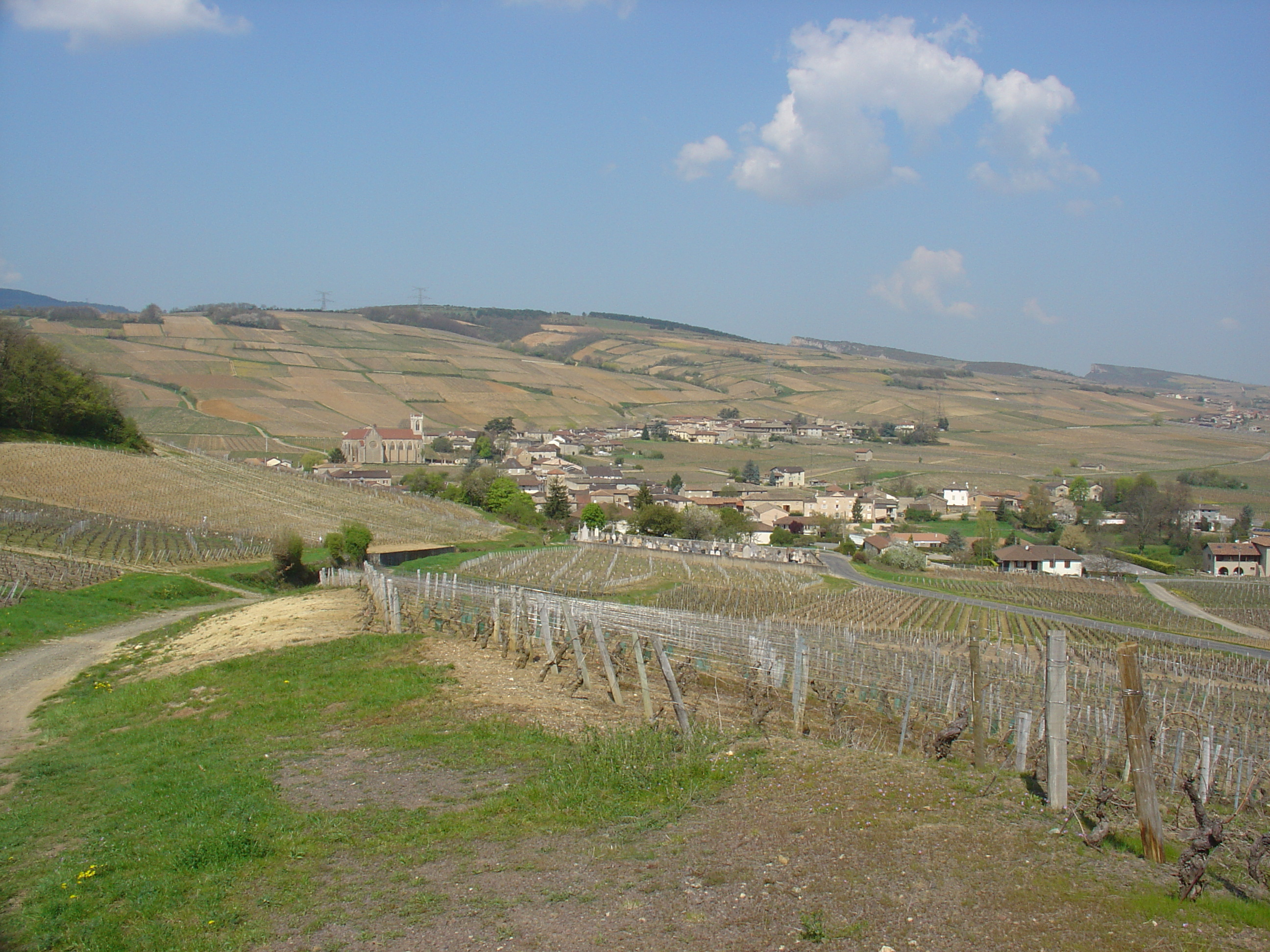
- A general view of Fuissé
- Location of Fuissé
- Location within France Location within Bourgogne-Franche-Comté
- Coordinates: 46°16′49″N 4°44′35″E
- Country: France
- Region: Bourgogne-Franche-Comté
- Department: Saône-et-Loire
- Arrondissement: Mâcon
- Canton: La Chapelle-de-Guinchay
- Intercommunality: Mâconnais Beaujolais Agglomération

Government
  - Mayor (2020–2026): Éric Lagrange
- Area^{1}: 4.86 km^{2} (1.88 sq mi)
- Elevation: 210 m (690 ft)
- Highest elevation: 420 m (1,380 ft)
- Lowest elevation: 210 m (690 ft)
- Population (2023): 347
  - Density: 71.4/km^{2} (185/sq mi)
- Time zone: UTC+01:00 (CET)
  - Summer (DST): UTC+02:00 (CEST)
- INSEE/Postal code: 71210 /71960
- ^{1} French Land Register data, which excludes lakes, ponds, glaciers > 1 km^{2} (0.386 sq mi or 247 acres) and river estuaries.

Fuissé (French pronunciation: [fɥise]; Arpitan: Fuissié) is a commune in the Saône-et-Loire department in the region of Bourgogne-Franche-Comté in eastern France.

== Wine ==
Vineyards of Fuissé are part of the AOC Pouilly-Fuissé, which is used for white wines from Chardonnay grapes.

== See also ==
- Communes of the Saône-et-Loire department
