= Georges Duboeuf =

French wine merchant (1933–2020)

- Born: 14 April 1933; Crêches-sur-Saône, Saône-et-Loire, France
- Died: 4 January 2020 (aged 86)
- Occupation: Wine merchant
- Known for: Founder of Les Vins Georges Duboeuf
- Spouse: Rolande
- Children: 2

Georges Duboeuf (14 April 1933 – 4 January 2020) was a French wine merchant, and the founder of Les Vins Georges Duboeuf, one of the largest wine merchants in France. The company is known for its popularization and production of Beaujolais wines, leading to Duboeuf's nicknames of le roi du Beaujolais or sometimes pape du Beaujolais (the king or pope of Beaujolais).

== Early life ==
Duboeuf was born on 14 April 1933 in Crêches-sur-Saône, near the village of Chaintré, in the Pouilly-Fuissé appellation of France. Pouilly-Fuissé consists of five villages, southwest of the commune of Mâcon, in the central French wine-making region of Burgundy. Duboeuf was raised on a small farm, where his family owned a few acres of Chardonnay vines. His father died when he was very young, and his uncle and older brother, Roger, took over the business.

== Career ==
Duboeuf helped on the family vineyard growing up, cranking the manual grape crusher when he was just six. At the age of 18, he began delivering wine on his bicycle from producers to local restaurants. He began bottling Beaujolais to meet a customer's commission, and went on to form a syndicate of 45 local growers, the Ecrin Mâconnais-Beaujolais. The organization fell apart due to squabbling, and Duboeuf became a négociant in 1964, when he founded Les Vins Georges Duboeuf.

=== Les Vins Georges Duboeuf ===
Duboeuf's business produces more than 2.5 million cases of wine annually. He was almost single-handedly responsible for popularizing the annual Beaujolais nouveau phenomenon, and won awards for his wines. The company's wine labels are easily recognizable by their use of colorful flower images and the distinctive Duboeuf insignia.

In 2018, Duboeuf passed control of the company to his son Franck Duboeuf.

== Personal life ==
He married his wife Rolande in the early 1960s, and they had two children, Fabienne and Franck.

On 4 January 2020, Duboeuf died from a stroke at age 86.

== See also ==
- List of wine personalities
