= Chastreix =

- Commune
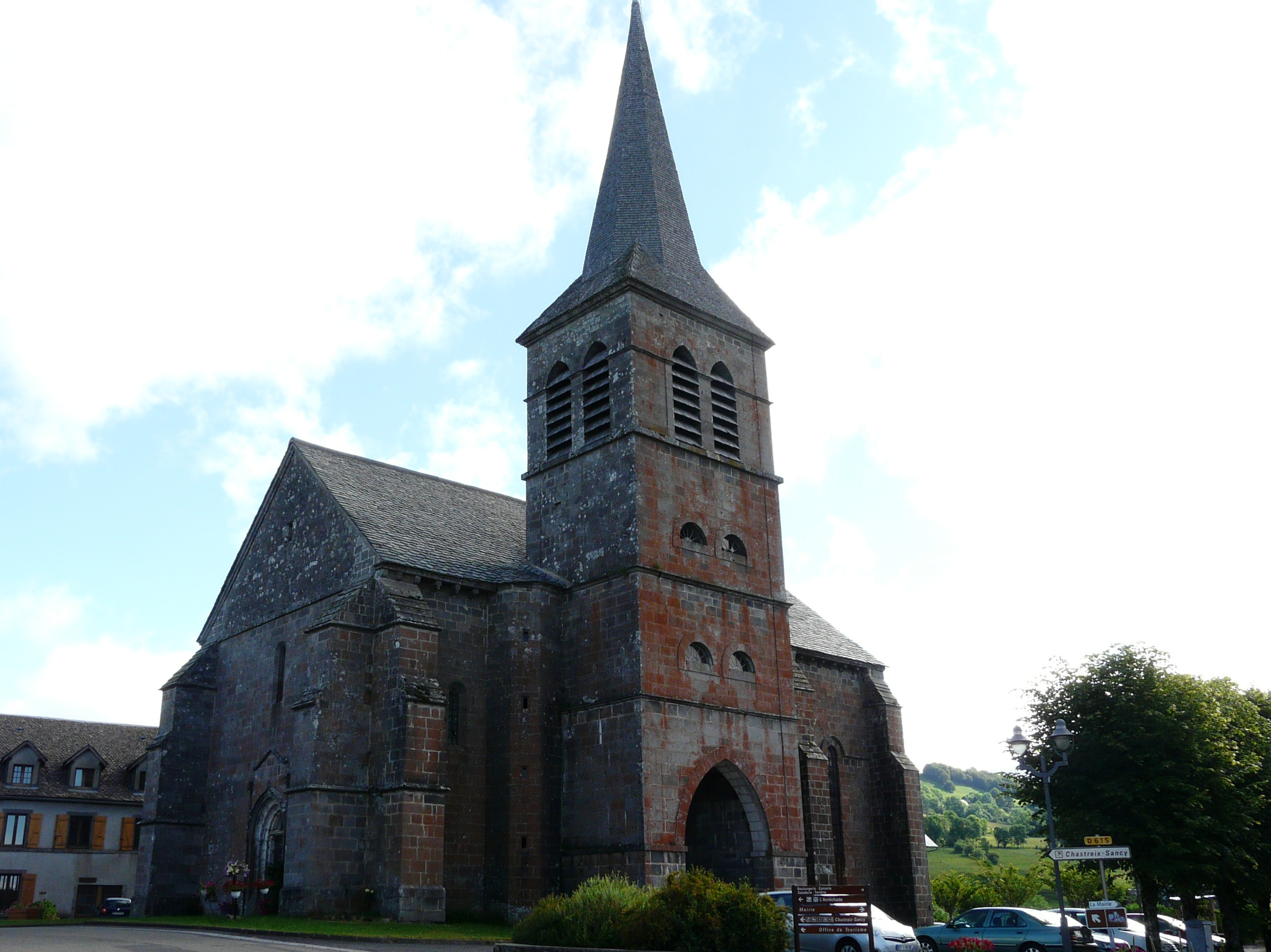
- The church in Chastreix
- Location of Chastreix
- Location within France Location within Auvergne-Rhône-Alpes
- Coordinates: 45°30′46″N 2°44′08″E
- Country: France
- Region: Auvergne-Rhône-Alpes
- Department: Puy-de-Dôme
- Arrondissement: Issoire
- Canton: Le Sancy
- Intercommunality: Massif du Sancy

Government
  - Mayor (2020–2026): Michel Babut
- Area^{1}: 45.12 km^{2} (17.42 sq mi)
- Elevation: 1,050 m (3,440 ft)
- Highest elevation: 1,883 m (6,178 ft)
- Lowest elevation: 895 m (2,936 ft)
- Population (2023): 226
  - Density: 5.01/km^{2} (13.0/sq mi)
- Time zone: UTC+01:00 (CET)
  - Summer (DST): UTC+02:00 (CEST)
- INSEE/Postal code: 63098 /63680
- ^{1} French Land Register data, which excludes lakes, ponds, glaciers > 1 km^{2} (0.386 sq mi or 247 acres) and river estuaries.

Chastreix is a commune in the Puy-de-Dôme department in Auvergne-Rhône-Alpes in central France.

To the northeast of Chastreix is the small ski resort of Chastreix-Sancy.

== Climate ==
Climate data for Chastreix (1991–2020 averages)
Month	Jan	Feb	Mar	Apr	May	Jun	Jul	Aug	Sep	Oct	Nov	Dec	Year
Record high °C (°F)	17.0 (62.6)	17.1 (62.8)	18.3 (64.9)	22.5 (72.5)	25.5 (77.9)	31.2 (88.2)	30.5 (86.9)	30.6 (87.1)	27.4 (81.3)	24.6 (76.3)	20.5 (68.9)	16.6 (61.9)	31.2 (88.2)
Mean daily maximum °C (°F)	2.4 (36.3)	2.2 (36.0)	5.0 (41.0)	8.1 (46.6)	12.3 (54.1)	16.0 (60.8)	18.2 (64.8)	18.3 (64.9)	14.4 (57.9)	10.8 (51.4)	5.7 (42.3)	3.5 (38.3)	9.7 (49.5)
Daily mean °C (°F)	−0.3 (31.5)	−0.7 (30.7)	1.9 (35.4)	4.5 (40.1)	8.4 (47.1)	12.1 (53.8)	14.1 (57.4)	14.3 (57.7)	10.8 (51.4)	7.6 (45.7)	3.0 (37.4)	0.8 (33.4)	6.4 (43.5)
Mean daily minimum °C (°F)	−3.0 (26.6)	−3.6 (25.5)	−1.2 (29.8)	1.0 (33.8)	4.6 (40.3)	8.1 (46.6)	9.9 (49.8)	10.2 (50.4)	7.1 (44.8)	4.4 (39.9)	0.2 (32.4)	−1.9 (28.6)	3.0 (37.4)
Record low °C (°F)	−15.7 (3.7)	−19.1 (−2.4)	−14.8 (5.4)	−10.0 (14.0)	−5.4 (22.3)	−0.9 (30.4)	0.7 (33.3)	2.1 (35.8)	−1.3 (29.7)	−8.3 (17.1)	−13.3 (8.1)	−16.8 (1.8)	−19.1 (−2.4)
Average precipitation mm (inches)	122.5 (4.82)	107.9 (4.25)	112.6 (4.43)	125.2 (4.93)	154.3 (6.07)	139.0 (5.47)	123.5 (4.86)	120.4 (4.74)	141.1 (5.56)	141.6 (5.57)	165.9 (6.53)	153.3 (6.04)	1,607.3 (63.28)
Average precipitation days (≥ 1.0 mm)	13.6	11.7	12.1	13.6	14.3	11.6	10.6	11.0	11.9	12.8	14.6	13.9	151.9
Mean monthly sunshine hours	97.5	118.3	152.9	166.8	171.1	196.3	228.6	211.6	176.8	138.0	87.2	91.8	1,836.9
Source: Meteociel

== See also ==
- Communes of the Puy-de-Dôme department
