= Poile (surname) =

Poile is an English surname of several possible origins.

== Origins ==
There are numerous claims as to the origins of the Poile surname, known as location and occupational origins.

=== Apulia, Italy ===
Ethnic name from the Middle English Poille, Poyle, Apuelle, which are representations of Apulia, Italy, and denote someone from there; Pulleis denotes 'man of Apulia', or 'Pulley'. Thus Poile is considered in this instance a variant of Pulley.

=== Poyle, England ===
A locational surname from a place called Poyle, Surrey, a small town near to Heathrow airport. The place name is derived from the Middle English 'pol', meaning pool, pond, deep place in a river. For the place in England, see Poyle, England.

=== Occupational name ===
Poil is French for hair or bristle, which leads to the suggestion the surname is derived from a trade, perhaps the making of brushes.

A large proportion of individuals with the Poile surname resided in Kent and Sussex at the time of the 1881 census, and it has been suggested that the name originated from France.

== Primary locations ==
The Poile surname is primarily found in southern England.

== Frequency ==
Current frequency in Great Britain is estimated at 155 individuals (at date of source publication), whereas in 1881 there were 129 individuals.

According to England and Wales census data, the number of individuals with the Poile surname were: 1841: 114 1881: 150 1921: 171

== Notable people ==
- Bud Poile (1924–2005), Canadian ice hockey player, coach, general manager, and league executive
- Craig Poile, Canadian poet who won the Archibald Lampman Award in 2010 for his collection True Concessions
- David Poile (born 1950), Canadian retired ice hockey executive and former player
- Don Poile (1932–2024), Canadian ice hockey player

== Variants ==
Variants include Poyle, Poyl, and Poil, listed as variants of Pulley.
