= Pouilly-Vinzelles =

AOC for white wine in France

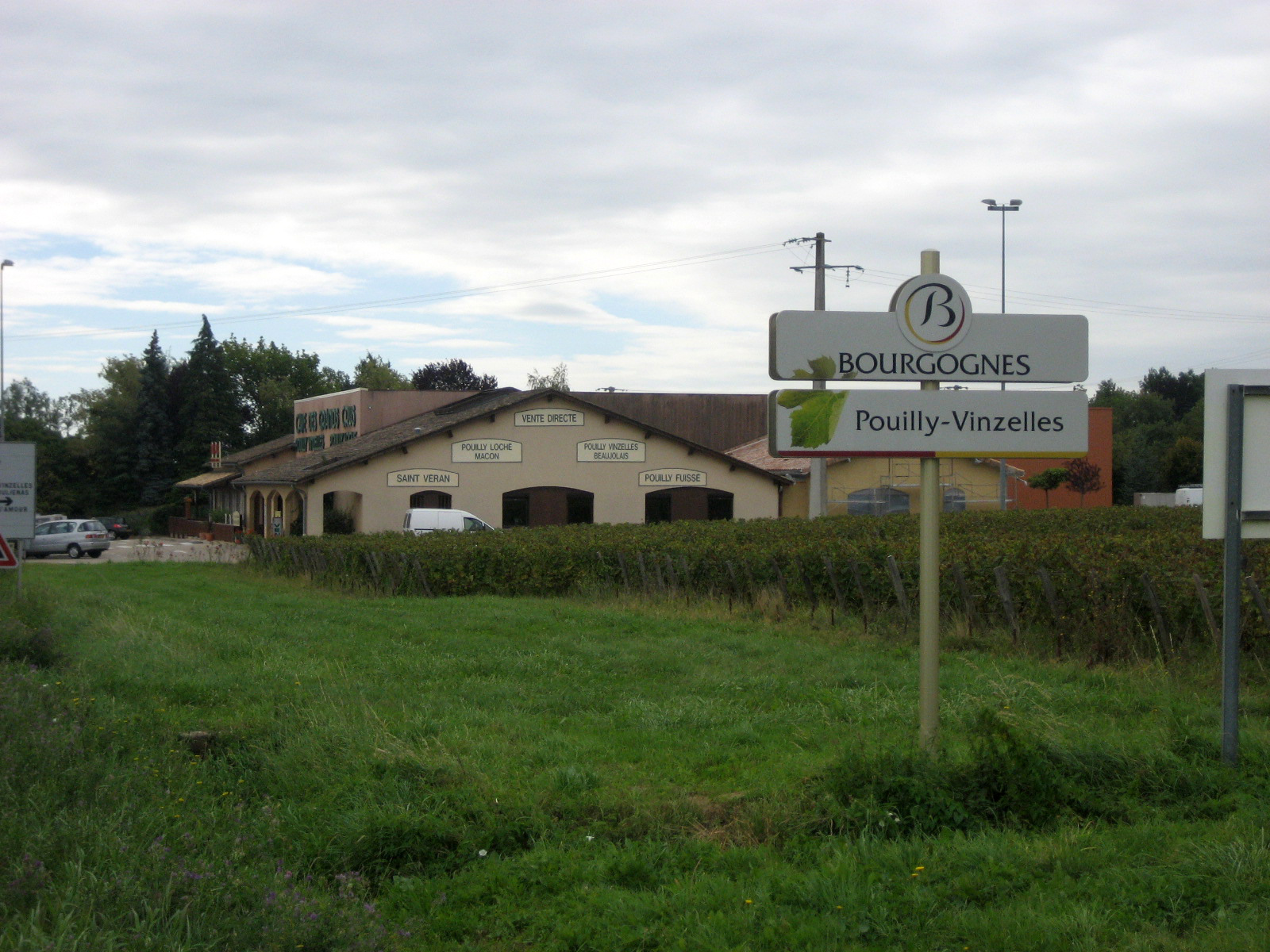

Pouilly-Vinzelles is an Appellation d'Origine Contrôlée (AOC) for white wine in the Mâconnais subregion Burgundy in central France, located in the communes of Vinzelles and Loché, the latter an associated commune of Mâcon. Pouilly-Vinzelles has Chardonnay as the only allowed grape variety. There are no premier cru vineyards within the AOC, as the local growers at the time the regulations were being drawn up never applied for this. The AOC was created in 1940.

Pouilly-Vinzelles is located adjacent to the appellation Pouilly-Fuissé, which is considerably larger than Pouilly-Vinzelles, and just south of Pouilly-Loché. These three neighbouring appellations all produce white wines of a similar style.

== Production ==
In 2008, 52.12 hectares (128.8 acres) of vineyard surface was in production for Pouilly-Vinzelles AOC, and 1,709 hectoliter of wine was produced, corresponding to close to 230,000 bottles of white wine.

== AOC regulations ==
The AOC regulations only allow Chardonnay to be used. The allowed base yield is 50 hectoliter per hectare and the grapes must reach a maturity of at least 11.0 per cent potential alcohol.
