= Chaintré =

- Commune
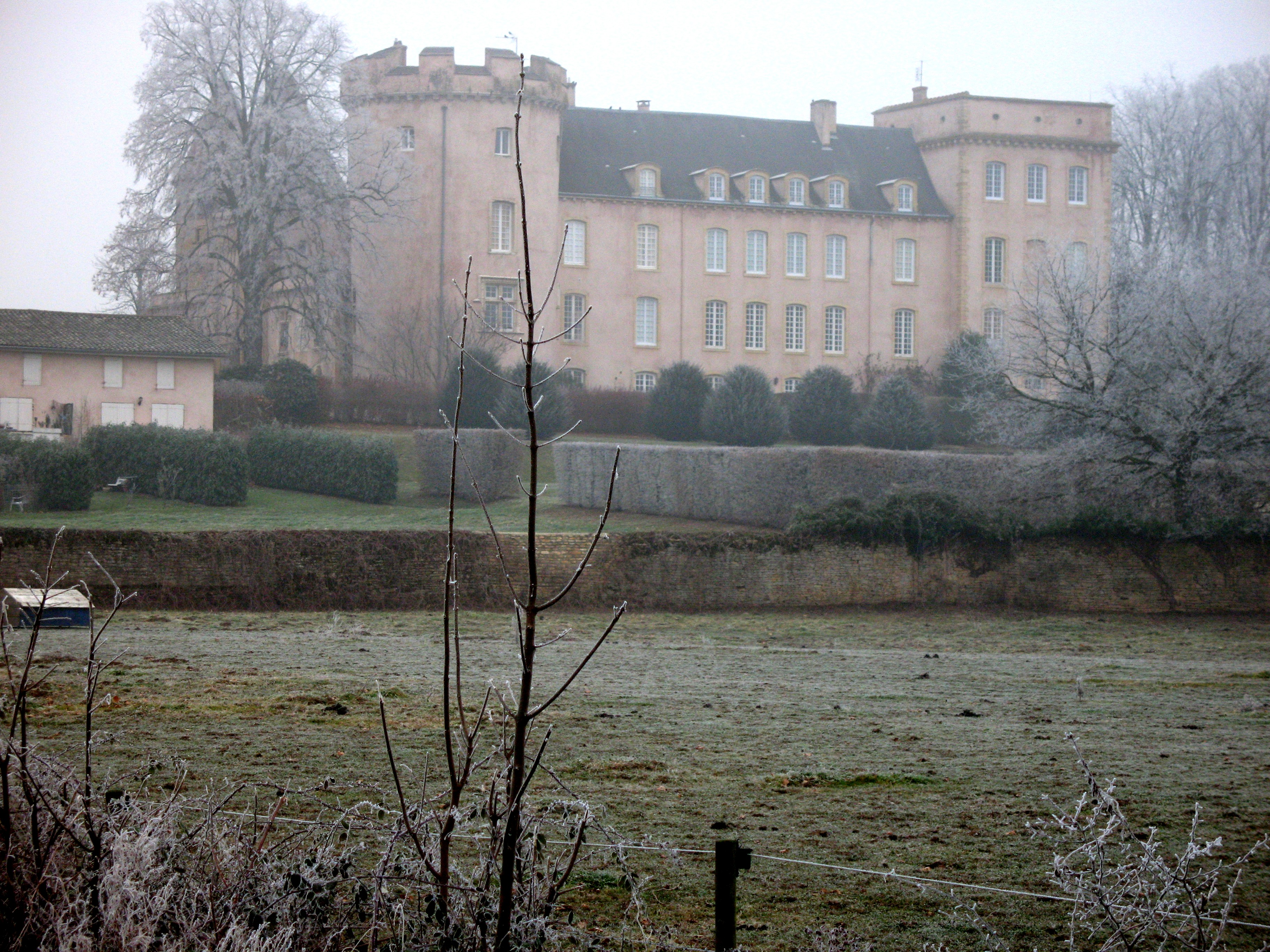
- Chateau

- Coat of arms
- Location of Chaintré
- Location within France Location within Bourgogne-Franche-Comté
- Coordinates: 46°15′41″N 4°45′36″E
- Country: France
- Region: Bourgogne-Franche-Comté
- Department: Saône-et-Loire
- Arrondissement: Mâcon
- Canton: La Chapelle-de-Guinchay
- Intercommunality: Mâconnais Beaujolais Agglomération

Government
  - Mayor (2020–2026): Jean-François Cognard
- Area^{1}: 3.31 km^{2} (1.28 sq mi)
- Elevation: 280 m (920 ft)
- Highest elevation: 285 m (935 ft)
- Lowest elevation: 171 m (561 ft)
- Population (2023): 569
  - Density: 172/km^{2} (445/sq mi)
- Time zone: UTC+01:00 (CET)
  - Summer (DST): UTC+02:00 (CEST)
- INSEE/Postal code: 71074 /71570
- ^{1} French Land Register data, which excludes lakes, ponds, glaciers > 1 km^{2} (0.386 sq mi or 247 acres) and river estuaries.

Chaintré (French pronunciation: [ʃɛ̃tʁe]) is a commune in the Saône-et-Loire department in the region of Bourgogne-Franche-Comté in eastern France.

== Wine ==
The vineyards of Chaintré form part of the AOC Pouilly-Fuissé.

== See also ==
- Communes of the Saône-et-Loire department
