= Poilley =

Poilley refers to two communes in France:

- Poilley, Ille-et-Vilaine
- Poilley, Manche
