= Pouilly-Loché =

French wine

Pouilly-Loché is an Appellation d'Origine Contrôlée (AOC) for white wine in the Mâconnais subregion Burgundy in central France, located in the commune of Loché, an associated commune of Mâcon. Pouilly-Loché has Chardonnay as the only allowed grape variety. As of 2024, there is one premier cru vineyard within the AOC, Les Mûres, covering 7.09 hectares. The AOC was created in 1940.

Pouilly-Loché is located adjacent to the appellations Pouilly-Fuissé, which is considerably larger than Pouilly-Loché, and Pouilly-Vinzelles, but is located slightly closer to Mâcon. These three neighbouring appellations all produce white wines of a similar style.

== Production ==
In 2008, 32.14 hectares (79.4 acres) of vineyard surface was in production for Pouilly-Loché AOC, and 1,474 hectoliters of wine were produced, corresponding to just under 200,000 bottles of white wine.

== AOC regulations ==
The AOC regulations allow only Chardonnay to be used. The allowed base yield is 50 hectoliter per hectare and the grapes must reach a maturity of at least 11.0 per cent potential alcohol.
