= Pouillé =

Pouillé or Pouille (without acute accent) may refer to the following places in France:

- Pouillé, Loir-et-Cher, a commune in the Loir-et-Cher department
- Pouillé, Vendée, a commune in the Vendée department
- Pouillé, Vienne, a commune in the Vienne department

Pouillé may also refer to:

- Pouillé (ecclesiastical register)
- Lucas Pouille, French tennis player
