= Brives-Charensac =

- Commune
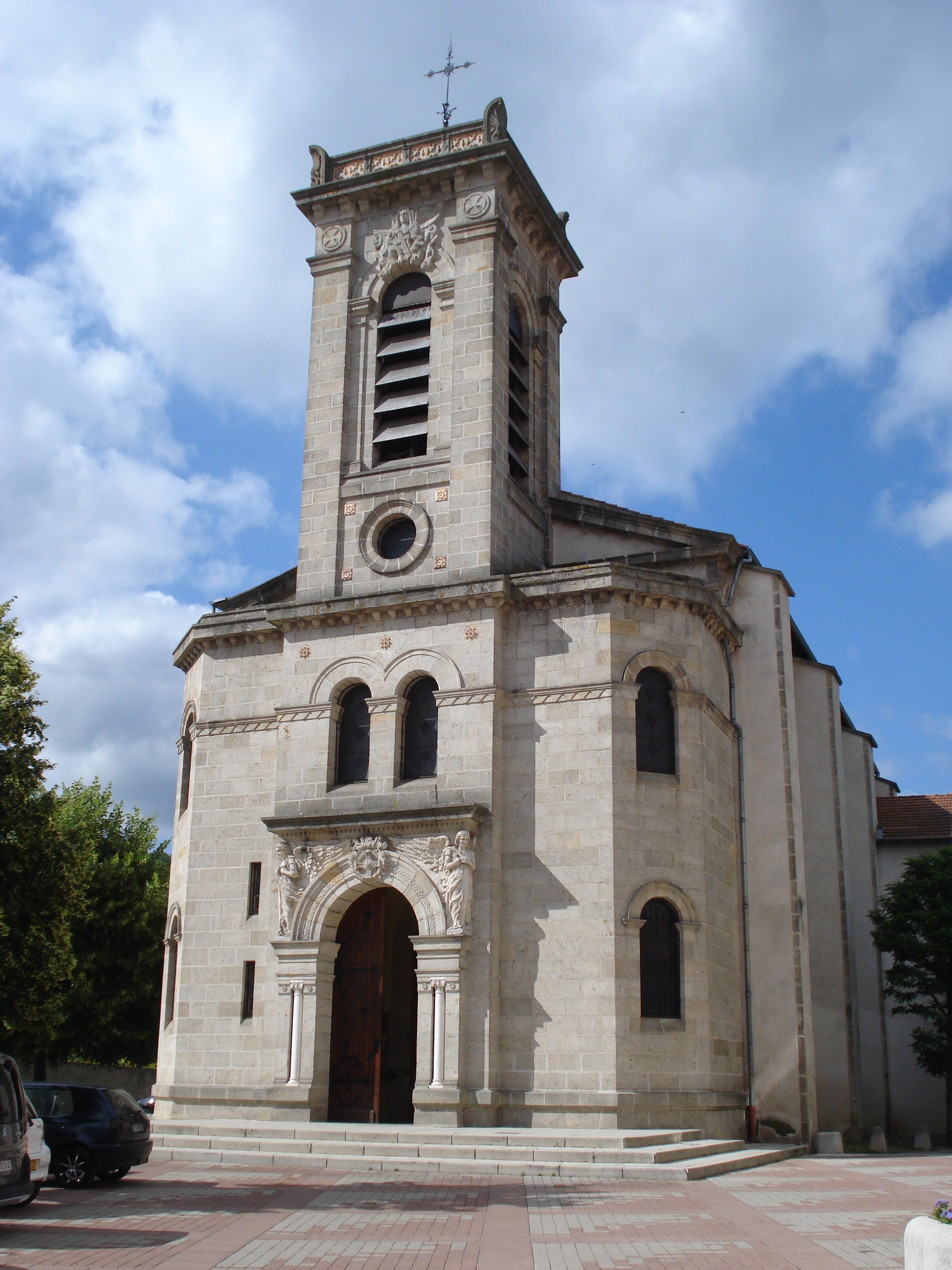

- Coat of arms
- Location of Brives-Charensac
- Location within France Location within Auvergne-Rhône-Alpes
- Coordinates: 45°02′51″N 3°55′39″E
- Country: France
- Region: Auvergne-Rhône-Alpes
- Department: Haute-Loire
- Arrondissement: Le Puy-en-Velay
- Canton: Le Puy-en-Velay-3
- Intercommunality: CA du Puy-en-Velay

Government
  - Mayor (2020–2026): Gilles Delabre
- Area^{1}: 4.87 km^{2} (1.88 sq mi)
- Elevation: 607 m (1,991 ft)
- Highest elevation: 838 m (2,749 ft)
- Lowest elevation: 598 m (1,962 ft)
- Population (2023): 4,244
  - Density: 871/km^{2} (2,260/sq mi)
- Time zone: UTC+01:00 (CET)
  - Summer (DST): UTC+02:00 (CEST)
- INSEE/Postal code: 43041 /43700
- ^{1} French Land Register data, which excludes lakes, ponds, glaciers > 1 km^{2} (0.386 sq mi or 247 acres) and river estuaries.

Brives-Charensac (French pronunciation: [bʁiv ʃaʁɑ̃sak]; Occitan: Briva e Charensac) is a commune in the Haute-Loire department in south-central France.

== Population ==
Historical population
Year	Pop.	±% p.a.
1968	2,880	—
1975	3,713	+3.70%
1982	4,069	+1.32%
1990	4,399	+0.98%
1999	4,356	−0.11%
2007	4,111	−0.72%
2012	4,275	+0.79%
2017	4,085	−0.91%
2023	4,244	+0.64%
Source: INSEE

== See also ==
- Communes of the Haute-Loire department
