= Chastreix-Sancy =

Ski resort in Puy-de-Dôme, France

- Location within France Location within Auvergne-Rhône-Alpes
- Location: Chastreix, Puy-de-Dôme, Auvergne-Rhône-Alpes, France
- Nearest city: Clermont-Ferrand
- Coordinates: 45°32′3.75″N 2°46′35.71″E
- Top elevation: 1,730 m (5,680 ft)
- Base elevation: 1,400 m (4,600 ft)
- Trails: Alpine: 7 green, 4 blue, 3 red, 2 black; Cross country: 1 green, 1 red, 1 blue
- Snowmaking: Yes
- Website: www.sancy.com

Chastreix-Sancy is a small ski resort situated above the village of Chastreix in central France. The resort is the smallest of the three main resorts situated in the Monts Dore and has no skiable link to the other two resorts. The main activities offered at the resort are alpine skiing, cross-country skiing, snowshoeing, ski touring, dog sledding and hiking. It is a calm resort popular with families and locals, as it boasts gentle runs, panoramic views and short queues.

== Geography ==
The resort is situated at an altitude of 1,400 m (4,600 ft) in the Monts Dore mountain range within the Massif Central, built on and between the Puy de Chabane and Mont Redon, on the west side of the Puy de Sancy, which is part of an ancient stratovolcano which has been dormant for 220,000 years. It is within the Parc naturel régional des volcans d'Auvergne and the commune of Chastreix in the Puy-de-Dôme department of the Auvergne-Rhône-Alpes region. It is about 40 km (25 mi) south west of the prefecture of the Puy-de-Dôme department Clermont-Ferrand, also capital of the Auvergne. The resort is sandwiched between the Cirque de la Fontaine Salée to the south-east and the Val d'Enfer, or Valley of Hell in English, to the north-east. Both of these have left the resort with no formal links to the other two resorts in the Massif du Sancy ski area.

=== Climate ===
Climate data for Chastreix, 1,385 m (4,544 ft) (1991−2020 normals)
Month	Jan	Feb	Mar	Apr	May	Jun	Jul	Aug	Sep	Oct	Nov	Dec	Year
Mean daily maximum °C (°F)	2.4 (36.3)	2.2 (36.0)	5.0 (41.0)	8.1 (46.6)	12.3 (54.1)	16.0 (60.8)	18.2 (64.8)	18.3 (64.9)	14.4 (57.9)	10.8 (51.4)	5.7 (42.3)	3.5 (38.3)	9.7 (49.5)
Daily mean °C (°F)	−0.3 (31.5)	−0.7 (30.7)	1.9 (35.4)	4.5 (40.1)	8.4 (47.1)	12.1 (53.8)	14.1 (57.4)	14.3 (57.7)	10.8 (51.4)	7.6 (45.7)	3.0 (37.4)	0.8 (33.4)	6.4 (43.5)
Mean daily minimum °C (°F)	−3 (27)	−3.6 (25.5)	−1.2 (29.8)	1.0 (33.8)	4.6 (40.3)	8.1 (46.6)	9.9 (49.8)	10.2 (50.4)	7.1 (44.8)	4.4 (39.9)	0.2 (32.4)	−1.9 (28.6)	3.0 (37.4)
Average precipitation mm (inches)	122.5 (4.82)	107.9 (4.25)	112.6 (4.43)	125.2 (4.93)	154.3 (6.07)	139.0 (5.47)	123.5 (4.86)	120.4 (4.74)	141.1 (5.56)	141.6 (5.57)	165.9 (6.53)	153.3 (6.04)	1,607.3 (63.27)
Average precipitation days (≥ 1.0 mm)	13.6	11.7	12.1	13.6	14.3	11.6	10.6	11.0	11.9	12.8	14.6	13.9	151.7
Source: Météo-France

== Lift system ==
=== Les Carrières 1 & 2 ===
Les Carrières 1 & 2 are a pair of green button lifts used primarily by beginners to access the two green runs, Les Carrières and Les Marmottes, that start from their top stations during the winter season. They were built by Gimar Montaz Mautino with a gap of 16 years between their respective constructions, with Les Carrières 1 being built first in 1969 and Les Carrières 2 being built afterwards in 1985. They both follow the same route with their pylons similarly spaced along the lines, and both have the motor placed at the bottom station, at an elevation of 1406m, and the tension applied at the top station, at an elevation of 1466m, with a vertical gain of 60m and a length of 402m. However their differences are that, due to the terrain, Les Carrières 2 has a slightly steeper maximum slope at 22% rather than the 20% of Les Carrières 1. In addition, with Les Carrières 2 being newer, it is faster. Les Carrières 2 has an operating speed of 3.6 m/s and a throughput of 900 people per hour, compared with the slower 3.5 m/s operating speed and 600 people per hour throughput of Les Carrières 1. Both the motors spin so that the passengers travel to the right of the pylons on their upwards journey.

== See also ==
- Super Besse
- Mont-Dore
