= Solutrean hypothesis =

Hypothesis for ancient human migrations to the Americas

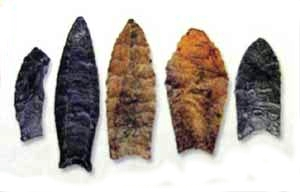
Examples of Clovis and other Paleoindian point forms, markers of archaeological cultures in North America.

The Solutrean hypothesis on the peopling of the Americas is the claim that the earliest human migration to the Americas began from Europe during the Solutrean Period, with Europeans traveling along pack ice in the Atlantic Ocean. This hypothesis contrasts with the mainstream academic narrative that the Americas were populated first by people crossing the Bering Strait to Alaska by foot on what was land during the Last Glacial Period or by following the Pacific coastline from Asia to America by boat.

The Solutrean hypothesis posits that about 21,000 years ago a group of people from the Solutré region of France, who are characterized historically by their unique lithic technique, migrated to North America along pack ice in the Atlantic Ocean. Once they made it to North America, their lithic technique dispersed around the continent (c. 13,000 years ago) to provide the basis for the later popularization of Clovis lithic technology. The premise of the Solutrean Hypothesis is that the similarities between Clovis and Solutrean lithic technologies are evidence that the Solutreans were the first people to migrate to the Americas, dating long before mainstream scientific theories of the peopling of the Americas.

The theory was proposed in 2004 by Dennis Stanford of the Smithsonian Institution and Bruce Bradley of the University of Exeter. However, according to David Meltzer, "[f]ew if any archaeologists—or, for that matter, geneticists, linguists, or physical anthropologists—take seriously the idea of a Solutrean colonization of America." The evidence for the hypothesis is considered more consistent with other scenarios. In addition to an interval of thousands of years between the Clovis and Solutrean eras, the two technologies show only incidental similarities. There is no evidence for any Solutrean seafaring, much less for any technology that could take humans across the Atlantic during an ice age. Genetic evidence supports the theory of Asian, not European, origins for the peopling of the Americas.

== Origin of Solutrean culture ==
Solutrean culture originated in present-day France, Spain and Portugal, from roughly 21,000 to 17,000 years ago. The Solutrean tool manufacturing epoch is a late intermediate stage, following microlithic miniaturization innovations and composite tool industries in the Aurignacian and Gravettian periods, between the mostly large-scale lithic industries of the Middle Paleolithic and the precision bone tools of the Magdalenian epochs, respectively, with an interlude termed the Badegoulian during the Last Glacial Maximum in which the lithic assemblage was specialised for the processing of osseous materials and wood. Solutrean tool-making employed techniques not done before and not rediscovered for millennia, distinguishing the Solutrean technique as far ahead of its time. The Solutrean toolmaking industry disappeared from Europe around 17,000 years ago to be replaced by the Magdalenian bone and flint-based industry and Epigravettian microlithic composite traditions, which were more often more expedient than Solutrean tools. Solutrean technology involves the restoration of bifacial reduction techniques that were largely abandoned, but refined, during the Gravettian and Pavlovian phases in Europe.

== Characteristics of Solutrean lithic techniques ==
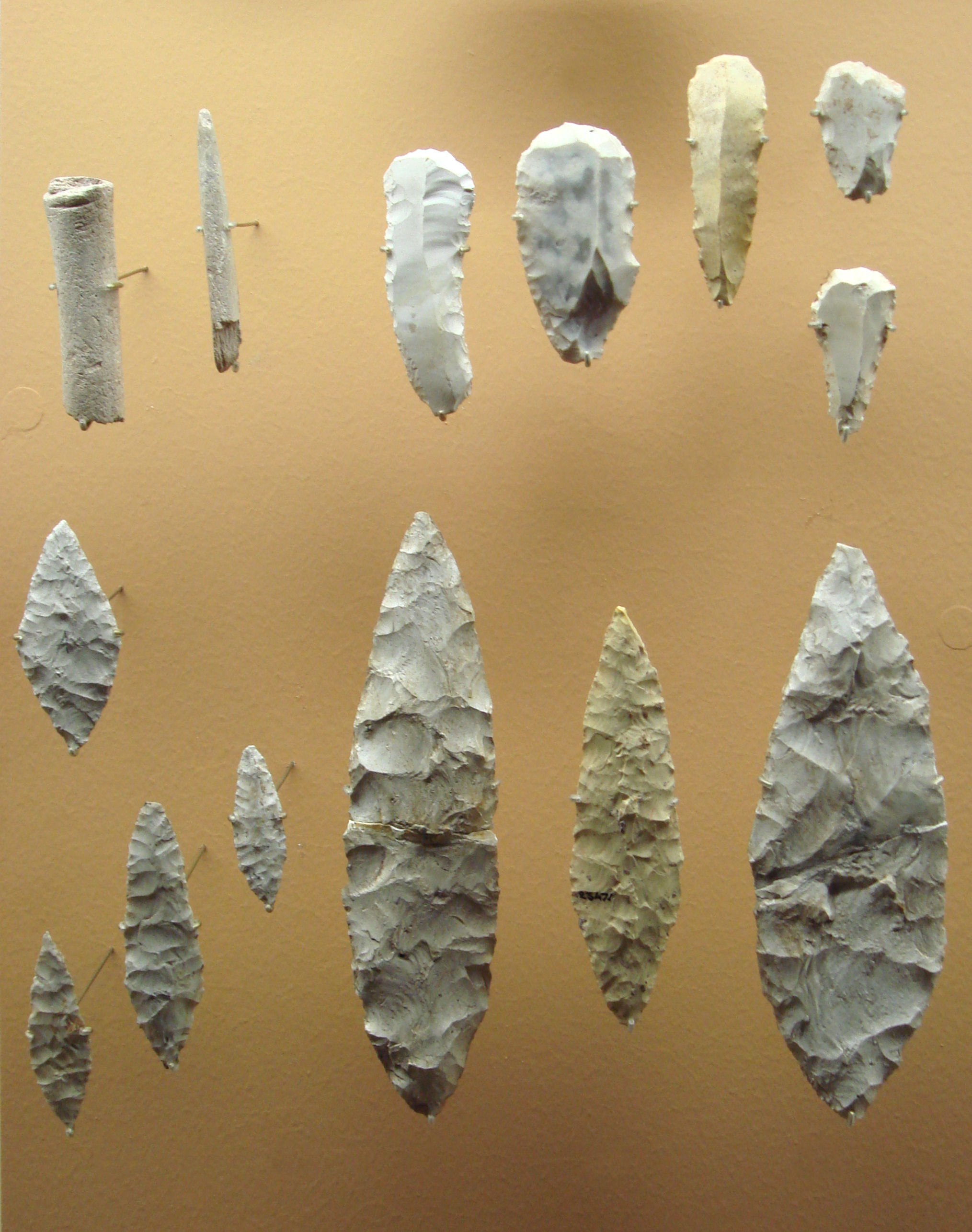
Solutrean tools created using bifacial percussion flaking.

The most important and distinctive characteristic of Solutrean lithic techniques is the bifacial percussion-flaked points present in most Solutrean artifacts. This characteristic provides the primary foundation for evidence in support of the Hypothesis, as Solutrean and Clovis points share this commonality. The Clovis culture is a prehistoric Paleoamerican culture, named for distinct stone tools found near Clovis, New Mexico. When observed, both of these tools share common aesthetic features which have led to the speculation that Clovis points derived from Solutrean techniques.

Clovis tools are characterized by a distinctive type of spear point, known as the Clovis point. Solutrean and Clovis points do have common traits: the points are thin and bifacial, and both use the "outrepassé", or overshot flaking technique, that quickly reduces the thickness of a biface without reducing its width. The Clovis point differs from the Solutrean in that some of the former have bifacial fluting, referring to the long groove carved into the bottom edge of a point to help attach it to the head of a spear. Bifacial fluting describes blades on which this feature appears on both its sides.

Clovis toolmaking technology appears in the archaeological record in much of North America between 12,800 and 13,500 years ago. Older blades with this attribute have yet to be discovered from sites in either Asia or Alaska. The idea of a Clovis-Solutrean link remains controversial and does not enjoy wide acceptance. The hypothesis is challenged by the large gaps in time between the Clovis culture and Solutrean eras, a lack of evidence of Solutrean seafaring, lack of specific Solutrean features and tools in Clovis technology, the difficulties of the route, and other issues.

== Archeological issues ==
Supporters of the Solutrean hypothesis had indicated the presence of haplogroup X2, the global distribution of which is strongest in Anatolia and the northeast of America, a pattern they argue is consistent with their position. Michael Brown in a 1998 article identified this as evidence of a possible Caucasian founder population of early Americans spreading from the northeast coast. However, a 2008 article in the American Journal of Human Genetics by researchers in Brazil took up the argument against the Solutrean hypothesis. "Our results strongly support the hypothesis that haplogroup X, together with the other four main mtDNA haplogroups, was part of the gene pool of a single Native American founding population; therefore they do not support models that propose haplogroup-independent migrations, such as the migration from Europe posed by the Solutrean hypothesis."

An article in the January 2012 issue of the American Journal of Physical Anthropology also tends to argue against the Solutrean theory on genetic grounds, as did researchers in Italy, who argued that the distinctively Asian C4c and the disputed X2a had "parallel genetic histories". The abstract of that article also states that "[t]he similarities in ages and geographical distributions for C4c and the previously analyzed X2a lineage provide support to the scenario of a dual origin for Paleo-Indians. Taking into account that C4c is deeply rooted in the Asian portion of the mtDNA phylogeny and is indubitably of Asian origin, the finding that C4c and X2a are characterized by parallel genetic histories definitively dismisses the controversial hypothesis of an Atlantic glacial entry route into North America."

In 2014, the autosomal DNA of a 12,500+-year-old infant from Montana was sequenced. The DNA was taken from a skeleton referred to as Anzick-1, found in close association with several Clovis artifacts. Comparisons showed strong affinities with DNA from Siberian sites, and the report stated that "In agreement with previous archaeological and genetic studies our genome analysis refutes the possibility that Clovis originated via a European (Solutrean) migration to the Americas." The DNA also showed strong affinities with all existing Native American populations, which indicated that all of them derive from an ancient population that lived in or near Siberia, the Upper Palaeolithic Mal'ta population. Anzick-1's Y-haplogroup is Q. Dennis Stanford and Bruce Bradley responded to this analysis by noting that some of the artifacts associated with the Anzick-1 child were radiocarbon dated to between 56 and 483 years prior to the death of Anzick-1, implying that the Clovis points found at the site might not have even belonged to the child's community and that the child might not have been Clovis.

A 2014 genetic analysis published in the journal Nature reported that the DNA from a 24,000-year-old skeleton excavated in Eastern Siberia provided mitochondrial, Y chromosomal, and autosomal genetic evidence that suggests 14 to 38% of Native American ancestry originates from an ancient Western Eurasian population. The Mal'ta boy skeleton's mitochondrial genome belonged to mtDNA haplogroup U, which has also been found at high frequencies among Mesolithic European hunter-gatherers. The authors state that their findings have four implications, the third being that "such an easterly presence in Asia of a population related to contemporary western Eurasians provides a possibility that non-east Asian cranial characteristics of the First Americans derived from the Old World via migration through Beringia, rather than by a trans-Atlantic voyage from Iberia as proposed by the Solutrean hypothesis."

== Oceanographic analysis ==
A 2008 study of relevant oceanographic data from the time period in question, co-authored by Kieran Westley and Justin Dix, concluded that "it is clear from the paleoceanographic and paleo-environmental data that the Last Glacial Maximum in the North Atlantic does not fit the descriptions provided by the proponents of the Solutrean Atlantic Hypothesis. Although ice use and sea mammal hunting may have been important in other contexts, in this instance, the conditions militate against an ice-edge-following, maritime-adapted European population reaching the Americas." Relying on the location of the ice shelf at the time of the putative Atlantic crossing, they are skeptical that a transoceanic voyage to North America, even allowing for the judicious use of glaciers and ice floes as temporary stopping points and sources of fresh water, would have been feasible for people from the Solutrean era.

Stanford and Bradley's 2012 book Across Atlantic Ice: The Origin of America's Clovis Culture expands upon and revises earlier formulations of the Solutrean Hypothesis. The book received significant media attention, but evaluations of the evidence by professional archaeologists find the book unconvincing. The radiocarbon dates from purported pre-Clovis archaeological sites presented by Stanford and Bradley are consistently earlier in North America, pre-dating Solutrean culture in Europe by 5–10 thousand years.

== Genetic claims ==
Mitochondrial haplogroup X2a has also been claimed as evidence for ancient trans-Atlantic gene flow, but according to a comprehensive review by Raff & Bolnick (2015):

X2a has not been found anywhere in Eurasia, and phylogeography gives us no compelling reason to think it is more likely to come from Europe than from Siberia. Furthermore, analysis of the complete genome of Kennewick Man, who belongs to the most basal lineage of X2a yet identified, gives no indication of recent European ancestry and moves the location of the deepest branch of X2a to the West Coast, consistent with X2a belonging to the same ancestral population as the other founder mitochondrial haplogroups. Nor have any high-resolution studies of genome-wide data from Native American populations yielded any evidence of Pleistocene European ancestry or trans-Atlantic gene flow.

== Carbon dating issues ==
The Solutrean hypothesis is challenged by large gaps in time between the Clovis and Solutrean eras, a lack of evidence of Solutrean seafaring, lack of specific Solutrean features and tools in Clovis technology, the difficulties of the route and other issues.

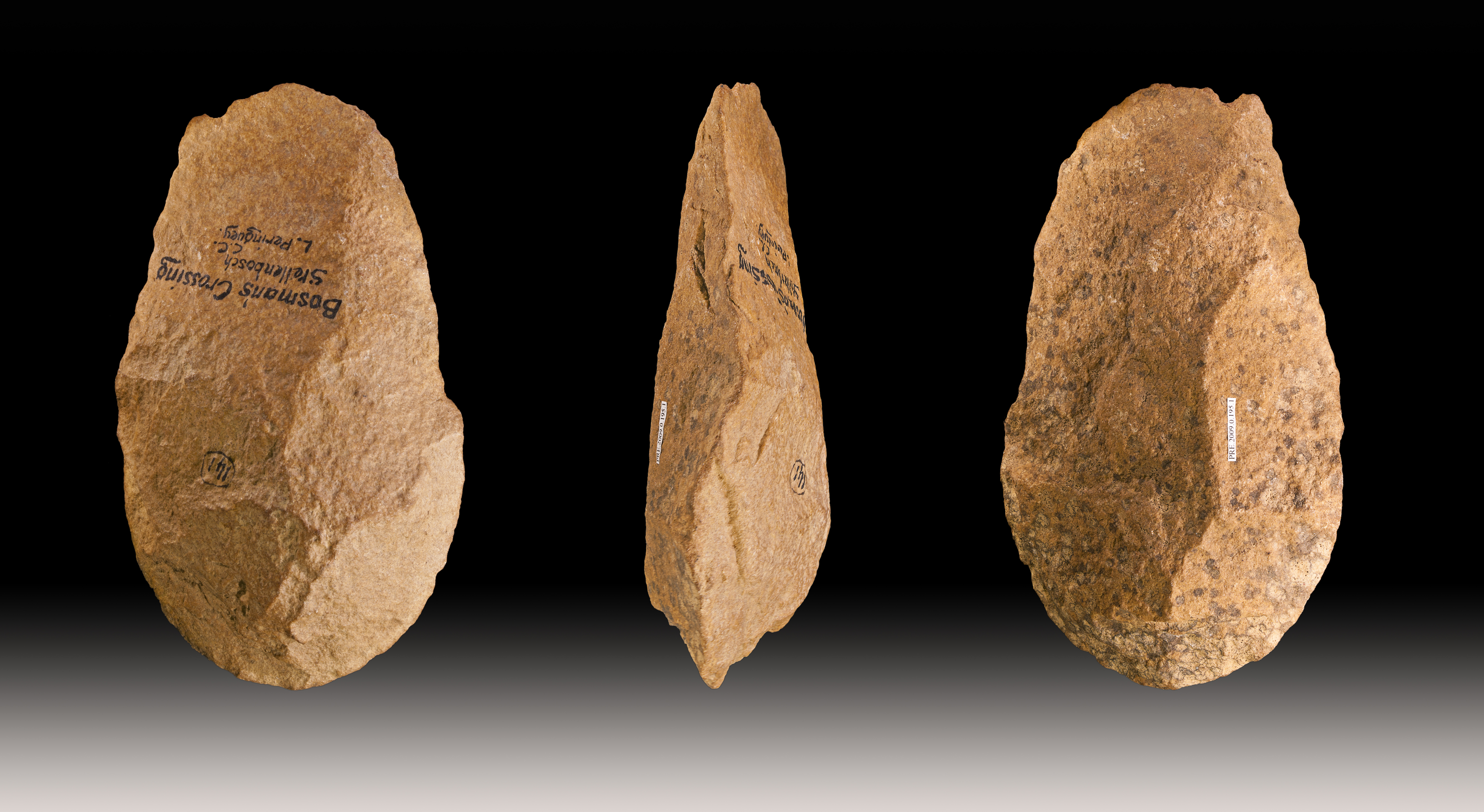
Biface hand axe stone tool.

In 1970 a stone tool, a biface hand axe, which was later suggested by Stanford and Bailey to resemble Solutrean stone tools, was dredged up by the trawler Cinmar off the east coast of Virginia in an area that would have been dry land prior to the rising sea levels of the Late Pleistocene. The tool was allegedly found in the same dredge load that contained a mastodon's remains. The mastodon tusks were later dated at 22,000 years old. In addition several archaeological sites on the Delmarva peninsula with suggestive, but not definitive, dating between 16,000 and 18,000 years have been discovered by Darrin Lowery of the University of Delaware. These factors led Stanford and Bradley to reiterate in 2014 their academic advocacy of pre-Clovis peoples in North America and their possible link to Paleolithic Europeans.

There are two basic points of contention concerning the Cinmar biface. One is whether its association with the mastodon remains is meaningful, and the other relates to the statement by Stanford and Bradley that the biface is pre-Late Glacial Maximum (LGM) and could not be Late Prehistoric, stating that they rejected that possibility "through an extensive evaluation of collections from the eastern seaboard in which no similar bifaces were identified from any post-LGM context." A report in the January 2015 issue of American Antiquity reviewed the literature and concluded "that the dual claims that such point forms are both rare and do not date to post-LGM contexts cannot be sustained." The same report also examined the 13 artifacts claimed to be older than 22,000 BP, finding they were "indistinguishable from visually identical bipoints from Holocene contexts across the eastern seaboard", and concluding: "The widespread distribution of these points, their well-established chronological and culture-historical associations, and the reported association with marine/deep-sea exploitation leads us to conclude that there is no reason to consider bi-points from the Delmarva Peninsula, New England, the Continental Shelf—or indeed anywhere in eastern North America—as necessarily derived from Solutrean culture or as necessarily being 'older than Clovis,' much less a distinct pre-Clovis 'cultural pattern'."

== Geographical separation ==
Arthur J. Jelinek, an anthropologist who took note of similarities between Solutrean and Clovis styles in a 1971 study, observed that the great geographical and temporal separation of the two cultures made a direct connection unlikely, since the dates of the proposed transitional sites and the Solutrean period in Europe only overlap at the extremes. He also argued that crossing the Atlantic with the means available at the time would have been difficult, if not impossible. The opinion is shared by Lawrence G. Straus, who wrote that "there are no representations of boats and no evidence whatsoever either of seafaring or of the ability to make a living mainly or solely from the ocean during the Solutrean." Straus excavated Solutrean artifacts along what is now a coastline in Cantabria, which was some ways inland during the Solutrean epoch. He found seashells and estuarine fish at the sites, but no evidence that deep sea resources had been exploited. Advocates state that the historic coastlines of western Europe and eastern North America during the Last Glacial Maximum are now under water and thus, evidence of Solutrean-era seafaring may have been obliterated or submerged.

Another challenge to the hypothesis involves the paucity of non-technological evidence of a kind we would expect to find transmitted from east to west; cave paintings of a kind associated with the Cave of Altamira in Spain, for example, are without close parallel in the New World. In response, Bradley and Stanford contend that it was "a very specific subset of the Solutrean who formed the parent group that adapted to a maritime environment and eventually made it across the north Atlantic ice-front to colonize the east coast of the Americas" and that this group may not have exhibited the full range of Solutrean cultural traits. A carved piece of bone depicting a mammoth found near the Vero man site in Florida was dated between 20,000 and 13,000 BP. It is described as possibly being the oldest art object yet found in the Americas. Art historian Barbara Olins has compared the Vero carving to "Franco-Cantabrian" drawings and engravings of mammoths. She notes that the San of southern Africa developed a realistic manner of representing animals similar to the "Franco-Cantabrian" style, indicating that such a style could have evolved in North America independently.

== Political controversy ==
Similar to the controversy surrounding Kennewick Man, the Solutrean hypothesis also became politicized during the 2010s. It has attracted the attention of some white supremacists, who have posited that the Americas were first settled by white Solutreans (disregarding the fact that the Solutreans were likely brown-skinned), who were later exterminated by the red-skinned Beringians, thus concluding that American Indians lack an ancestral claim to the land.

An episode of the Canadian Broadcasting Corporation documentary The Nature of Things in January 2018 was widely criticized by scientists and Native Americans for its uncritical presentation of the Solutrean hypothesis.

== See also ==
- Peopling of the Americas: When Paleolithic hunter-gatherers entered North America from the North Asian Mammoth steppe via the Beringia land bridge
- Last Glacial Maximum: The most recent time during the Last Glacial Period that ice sheets were at their greatest extent.
- Rock of Solutré: Solutrean culture type site.
- Models of migration to the New World: Scientifically accepted models of migration to the New World.
