= Adeline Fredin =

American archaeologist (1934–2018)

- Born: Adeline Alma Schultz; April 11, 1934; Nespelem, Washington, U.S.
- Died: January 7, 2016 (aged 81); Grand Coulee, Washington, U.S.
- Partner: Malvin Voldemar Fredin
- Children: Steven John Fredin
- Parents: Harry Sam (father); Ke-kie-met-sak (mother)

Adeline Mary Sam Fredin (April 11, 1934 – January 7, 2018) was an American archaeologist, tribal member, Director and Tribal Historic Preservation Officer of the Confederated Tribes of the Colville Reservation. She is best known as one of the first 12 accredited Tribal Heritage Preservation Officers in the United States and for her contributed efforts to the repatriation of Kennewick Man and furthering tribal engagement as an Indian Country leader in Cultural Resource Management. Fredin was a self-taught pioneer in the protection of Native American heritage and rights to the preservation of prehistoric artifacts and human remains. The Washington State Department of Archaeology and Historic Preservation describes Fredin's contributions to the field of archaeology as formative to the relationship between anthropology and tribal histories. Fredin was rumored a force to be reckoned with who maintained relationships with the Secretary of Interior, the White House and the Pentagon, perceived as an attorney of sorts when it came to Indian law.

== Contributions to cultural resource management ==
In 1974 she established the first tribal repository. In 1976, Fredin became director of the Archaeology department for the Confederated Tribes of the Colville Reservation. In 1990, she was a loud proponent of the Native American Graves Protection and Repatriation Act (NAGPRA) and in 1996, Fredin became one of the first 12 Tribal Historic Preservation Officers accredited and recognized by the US Federal government. When the tribe began a cultural program, Fredin was instrumental in converting it into a History department and ultimately the History and Archaeology Department. According to her colleagues, she was a well-respected, intelligent woman who used the National Historic Preservation Act along with other cultural resource laws, regulations, and protections to its full extent in order to fight for Native rights. Fredin retired in 2003, but continued to actively speak out in support of DNA testing The Ancient One (Kennewick Man) well into 2005. Fredin's early reburying of unearthed human remains as a result of high water levels and erosion after the installation of the Grand Coulee Dam and her persistent fight for Native American human and civil rights earned her respect nationally, both in Indian Country and amongst non-native people as well.

=== Repatriation of The Ancient One (Kennewick Man) and controversy ===
On July 28, 1996, a nearly complete skeleton was recovered from the Columbia River in Kennewick, Washington. The archaeologist who recovered the remains, James Chatters, controversially fought against tribal parties reclaiming the remains, pushing for them to be housed at the Smithsonian Institution. He reported incorrectly that a few markers of the 350 bone fragments exhibited Caucasoid traits, not Native American morphologies and attempted to have them relocated to the Smithsonian Institution in Washington, D.C. Adeline Fredin fought hard against the head of Archaeology at the Smithsonian Institution, Dennis Stanford, asserting that the Ancient One's remains stay under the guardianship of the Burke Museum of Natural History and Culture at the University of Washington.

Amidst the lengthy legal battle between the Army Corps of Engineers and associated tribes, Fredin toured nationally where she spoke publicly about the Ancient One and how she believed the tribes involved were being excluded from their own history. In 2004, on February 4, the United States Court of Appeals for the Ninth Circuit panel denied the Upper Columbia Basin Tribe's appeal to have the remains returned on the basis that they could not provide sufficient physical evidence of kinship despite oral traditions that indicated a strong connection to ancient peoples of the region. After nine years in litigation, the collective efforts of the Colville, Yakama, Wanapum, Nez Perce and Umatilla tribes along with Fredin's familiarity with NAGPRA made her an asset to the successful repatriation of the Ancient One.

In 2014, members of the Confederated Tribes of Colville provided DNA samples to be tested against that of Kennewick Man. This was an especially significant feat because of the tribe's distrust of Western science and traditional neglect of tribal needs. In June 2015, a DNA analysis done by the University of Copenhagen in Denmark claimed that the genetic makeup of Kennewick Man was very likely to be connected to descendant Native Americans, most closely the Confederated Tribes of the Colville Reservation. It was then formally announced that the results of 22 contributed DNA samples were enough to allow for the return of Kennewick Man's remains to the Upper Columbia Basin Tribes.

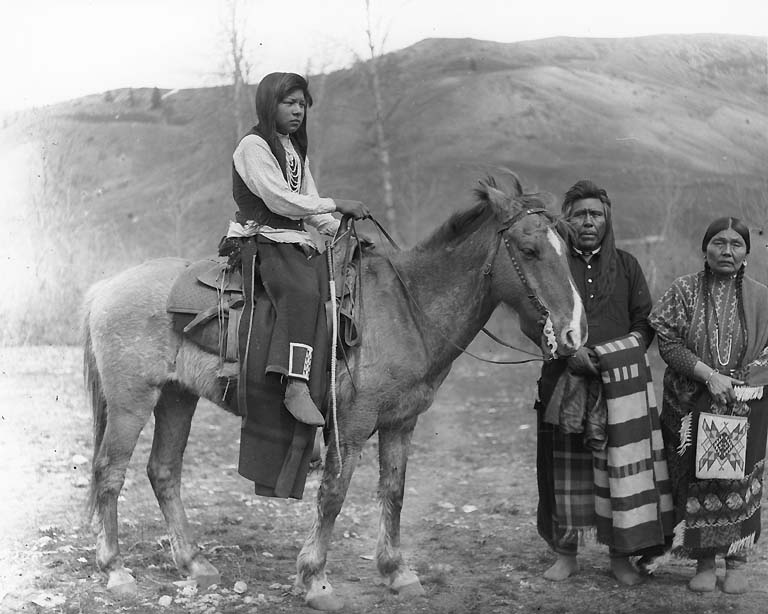
Adeline Fredin was a member of the Confederated Tribes of the Colville Reservation and a pioneering archaeologist dedicated to preserving the history of the Colville Tribe.

In September 2016, the United States House and Senate passed legislation allowing for the Upper Columbia Basin Tribes to rebury the Ancient One according to traditional funerary practices.

=== Grand Coulee Dam project ===
In The Acquisition of Indian Lands for Grand Coulee Dam Act of June 29, 1940, the Colville Confederated and Spokane tribes were forced to relocate to allow for the construction of the Grand Coulee Dam Project. Timber was frequently harvested around the Grand Coulee Dam, classified as a storage reservoir. In 1974, Fredin was contacted to address the erosion of soils that revealed numerous human remains due to the fluctuating rise and decline of water levels along the riverside. Fredin had a contact amongst the loggers who would alert her to when human remains would erode out of the soil. Allegedly, Fredin would rebury remains and funerary objects that had eroded out of the river bank. This firsthand experience led her to teach herself archaeology through a historical and cultural lens to create a program that allowed her and a team to form one of the original cultural heritage programs for the Confederated Tribes of the Colville Reservation.

By 1976, Fredin had committed herself to learning legislature and how to use it to compel federal agencies to respect Native American rights. She formed collaborations between the University of Washington and the U.S. Army Corps of Engineers to ensure thorough artifact analysis and preservation over the coming decade. The artifacts recovered from behind Chief Joseph Dam began the repository for the tribes, spear-headed by Fredin in 1976 and setting the precedent for tribes nationwide to be contacted whenever tribal remains or cultural artifacts are unearthed.

== Personal life ==
Adeline Mary Sam Fredin was born Adeline Alma Schultz in Nespelem, WA on April 11, 1934. According to Fredin's personal, unpublished biography, her father was Harry Sam, son of Pink-Street-Sah of the Methow Tribe (father) and Ke-kie-met-sak of the Moses/Palouse Tribes (mother). Fredin's paternal grandmother's given white name was Madeline Moses. Her mother was Christine Sam (née James), daughter of Yahx-Kew-Malks, whose white given name was Lucy James (née Machel) of the Okanogan Tribe. Her maternal grandmother, Yahx-Kew-Malks, was considered the Colville Reservation's traditional leader. Fredin's maternal grandfather and Chief of the SanPoil Tribe as well as multiple other tribes of the Colville Reservation was Joe James (d. 1928). Yahx-Kew-Malks then married Wil-wah-net-sah, whose given white name was Jim James. Jim James was also Chief of the SanPoil Tribe as well as multiple other tribes of the Colville Reservation following the death of Joe James.

Adeline grew up on an allotment gifted to her father by Minnie Yellow Wolf where she spent her youth hunting, gathering and foraging for local foods, materials, and resources. Growing up in such an environment while engaging with strong traditions and cultural practices gave Fredin a higher than average understanding of the social structure of her people, traditional territories, and the ancestral lands of her people.

With Malvin Voldemar Fredin, Fredin gave birth to son Steven John Fredin on January 31, 1951, at 17 years old. She was a registered member of the Confederated Tribes of the Colville Reservation. Fredin suffered from bouts of pneumonia in her 80s, leaving her too weak to attend the repatriation of The Ancient One (Kennewick Man) despite working closely with the case for 21 years. She died at the age of 83 in Grand Coulee, WA on January 7, 2018.
