= Anzick =

Anzick may refer to:

- Anzick site, ancient burial site of the Clovis culture
- Anzick-1, ancient human remains
