= Hugh Berryman =

American forensic anthropologist

Hugh E. Berryman
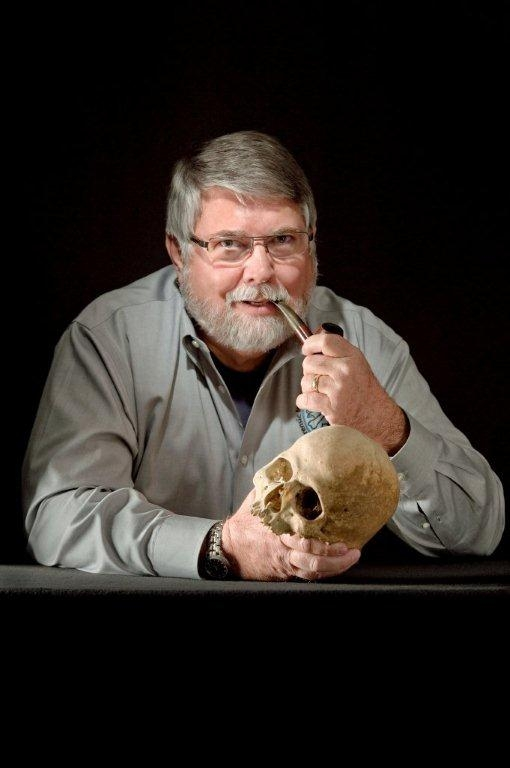
- Born: May 20, 1949 (age 77); Paris, Tennessee
- Citizenship: American
- Education: University of Tennessee
- Known for: study and analysis of Kennewick Man
- Spouse: Dr. Treva Berryman
- Awards: T. Dale Stewart; Diplomate 31 of American Board of Forensic Anthropology; Ellis R. Kerley Award 2008
- Scientific career
- Fields: Forensic anthropology
- Workplaces: Middle Tennessee State University's Forensic Institute for Research and Education
- Doctoral advisor: William M. Bass, Ph.D.

Hugh Berryman is a U.S. forensic anthropologist with areas of expertise in blunt force trauma, skeletal remains, and osteology. He is one of only three forensic anthropologists in the state of Tennessee and seventy-four in the nation certified by the American Board of Forensic Anthropology. Additionally, he has received two awards offered by the American Academy of Forensic Sciences (AAFS): the Ellis R. Kerley Award in 2008 (for a research paper on detection of gunshot primer residue on bone ) and the T. Dale Stewart lifetime achievement award in 2012. Due to his areas of expertise and qualifications, his assistance has been sought by local, state, and federal authorities as well as private interests.

== Kennewick Man ==
The Kennewick Man, one of North America's oldest and most complete skeletal remains, dated between 8,340 and 9,200 years old, was discovered in 1996. In 2006, after a long legal battle, a small team, including Hugh Berryman, was allowed to study the 90% intact skeletal remains.

== Meriwether Lewis Scientific Study ==
In February 2009, at the request of Lewis family representatives, a scientific study into the death of Meriwether Lewis was initiated. James E. Starrs, Hugh Berryman, and Kevin Smith led the scientific study to determine if Lewis' death was the suicide historical records indicated or a homicide. The National Park Service owns and manages the park where Lewis is buried in Hohenwald, Tennessee, and has refused to allow the body to be exhumed and examined. In 2011, investigating the theory that Lewis was murdered, The History Channel's Brad Meltzer interviewed Hugh Berryman as a blunt force trauma expert. Berryman discussed the difficulty of suicide as cause of death given the known historical details of the sustained wounds. However, he could not make a definitive assessment without the remains.

== Professional Background ==
Berryman received his Master of Arts and Doctorate of Philosophy in Anthropology from the University of Tennessee at Knoxville. He served on the faculty of the Department of Pathology at The University of Tennessee, Memphis and as Director of the Regional Forensic Center in Memphis from 1980 to 2000. He has provided lectures at the Smithsonian Institution, the Armed Forces Institute of Pathology, and the Tennessee Law Enforcement Training Academy. His service to his profession is highlighted as the Associate Director of the Southern Institute of Forensic Sciences (2000–2005), consultant to the Joint POW/MIA Accounting Command Central Identification Laboratory in Hawaii (U.S. war dead identification), the Office of the Tennessee State Medical Examiner, the Board of Directors for the American Board of Forensic Anthropologists (three terms), and is a member of The Scientific Working Group for Forensic Anthropology (SWGANTH). He was recently named to the Crime Scene/Death Investigation Scientific Area Committee’s (SAC’s) Anthropology Subcommittee within the Organization of Scientific Area Committees (OSAC) He is currently a Research Professor in the department of Sociology and Anthropology and the Director of the Forensic Institute for Research and Education also housed at Middle Tennessee State University.

== Contributions to Forensic Anthropology ==
Berryman has made significant academic contributions through his applied research in areas including blunt force trauma such as cranial gunshot wounds, archeology, and history.
