= Domaine du Chalet Pouilly =

French wine business

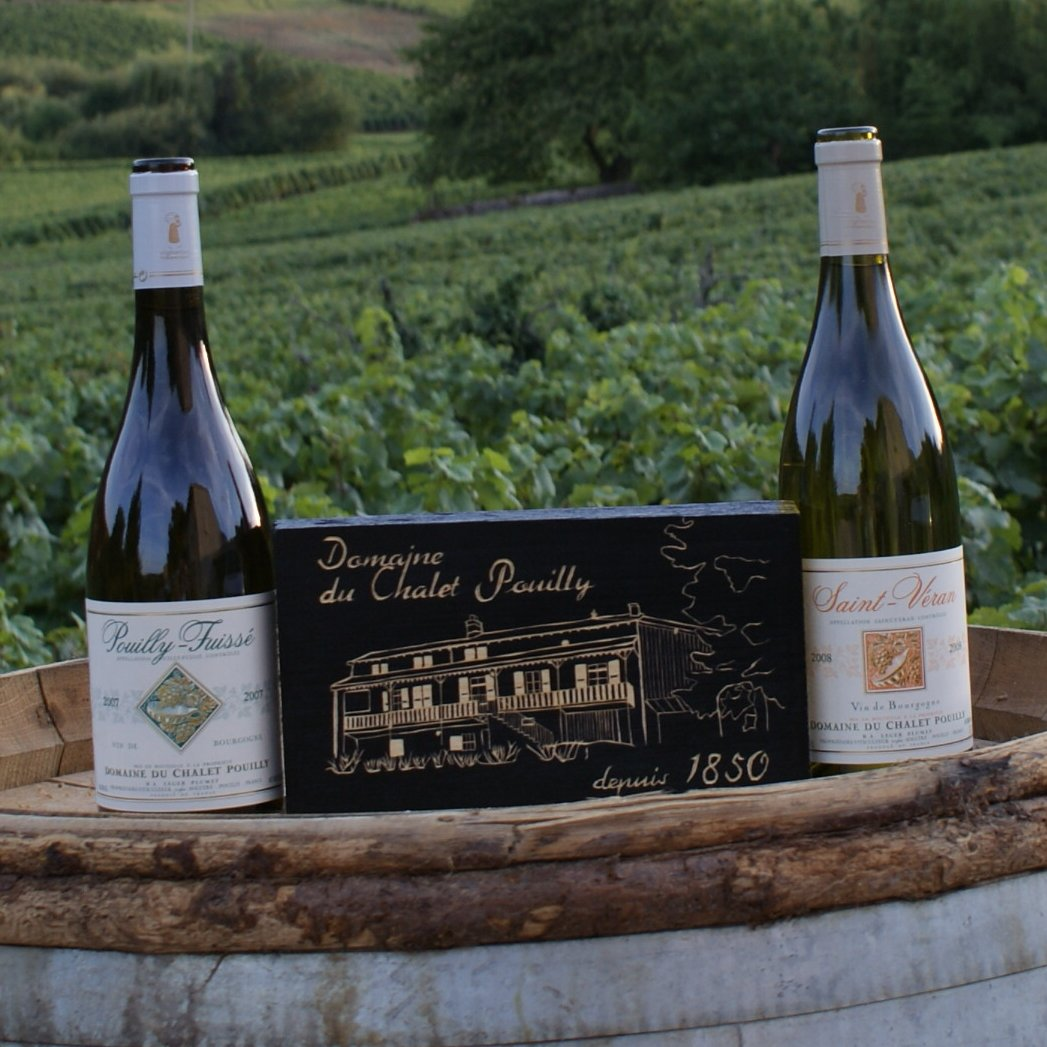
Pouilly-Fuissé and Saint-Véran

Domaine du Chalet Pouilly is a family wine business founded in 1850 that produces three Chardonnay wines: Pouilly-Fuissé, Saint-Véran and Mâcon-Solutré. The estate is located on a hillside overlooking the small hamlet of Pouilly in the "Pouilly-Fuissé" wine growing area of Burgundy, France. The 8.5-hectare property is shared by Pouilly-Fuissé, Saint-Véran and Mâcon-Solutré.

== History ==
The vineyard was founded by the Plummet family in Solutré-Pouilly, a village in the Mâconnais region, in 1850. The first documented recognition came in 1928 when Joseph and Philippine Plummet were awarded the first prize at the Mâcon wine competition for their Burgundy wine. At the time the Pouilly-Fuissé and Saint-Véran designations had not yet been adopted by the Institut National des Appellations d'Origine (INAO) (Pouilly-Fuissé and Saint-Véran appeared as geographical designations only in 1936 and 1971, respectively). Henri Plummet inherited the estate in 1950.

== Wines ==
Pouilly-Fuissé, Saint-Véran

Domaine du Chalet Pouilly practices traditional wine-growing methods.

- Pouilly-Fuissé: A dry 100%-Chardonnay white wine.
- Mâcon-Solutré: Planted in April 2011 and made with 100%-Chardonnay grapes.
- Saint-Véran: Made with 100%-Chardonnay grapes.
