= Parc archéologique et botanique de Solutré =

Archaeological site and botanical garden in France

Coordinates: 46.2978°N 4.7198°E

The Archaeological and Botanical Park of Solutre (“Parc archéologique et botanique de Solutré” in French) (13,000 m²) is an archaeological site and botanical garden maintained by the Musée départemental de Préhistoire, Solutré-Pouilly, Saône-et-Loire, Bourgogne, France. It is open daily but closed in December.

The park preserves one of the richest archaeological sites of prehistoric Europe: a hunting site used for more than 25,000 years during the Upper Paleolithic period, where hunters came to hunt and butcher thousands of horses and reindeer. Flint tools from this site have been termed Solutrean style. It was first excavated in 1866, classified as a historic monument in 1942, transferred to the management of the Conseil général de Saône-et-Loire in 1993, and opened to the public in 2006.

The park contains a marked trail through the former hunting site, with eight information areas describing the natural environment, its plant species, and results of archaeological research to date. Described are geology, animals in prehistoric times, hunting techniques, the landscape in prehistoric times, the site's discovery and initial excavation, and contemporary excavations.

Many regional trees, shrubs, and plants are labeled, including Acer campestre, Fraxinus excelsior, Juglans regia, Prunus mahaleb, Pyrus communis, Quercus pubescens, and Robinia pseudoacacia; Cornus sanguinea, Hippocrepis emerus, Ligustrum vulgare, Prunus spinosa, Ribes uva-crispa, Rosa canina, and Sambucus nigra; Aceras anthropophorum, Campanula rotundifolia, Clematis vitalba, Crataegus monogyna, Fragaria vesca, Geranium dissectum, Geranium molle, Geranium robertianum, Helleborus foetidus, Himantoglossum hircinum, Hypericum perforatum, Rubia peregrina, Rumex scutatus, Sanguisorba minor, Saponaria officinalis, Seseli montanum, Sedum album, Sedum reflexum, and Verbascum thapsus.

== See also ==
- List of botanical gardens in France
- Rock of Solutré
