= Anzick site =

Ancient Clovis site in Montana, US

Anzick Site
- Location within Montana
- 45°59′06″N 110°39′06″W
- Type: settlement
- Cultures: Clovis
- Location: Wilsall, Park County, Montana, United States

Site notes
- Excavation dates: 1968
- Archaeologists: Dee C. Taylor
- Owner: Private
- Public access: Yes

The Anzick Site (24PA506), located adjacent to Flathead Creek, a tributary of the Shields River in Wilsall, Park County, Montana, United States, is the only known Clovis burial site in the New World. The term "Clovis" is used by archaeologists to define one of the New World's earliest hunter-gatherer cultures and is named after the site near Clovis, New Mexico, where human artifacts were found associated with the procurement and processing of mammoth and other large and small fauna.

== Discovery ==
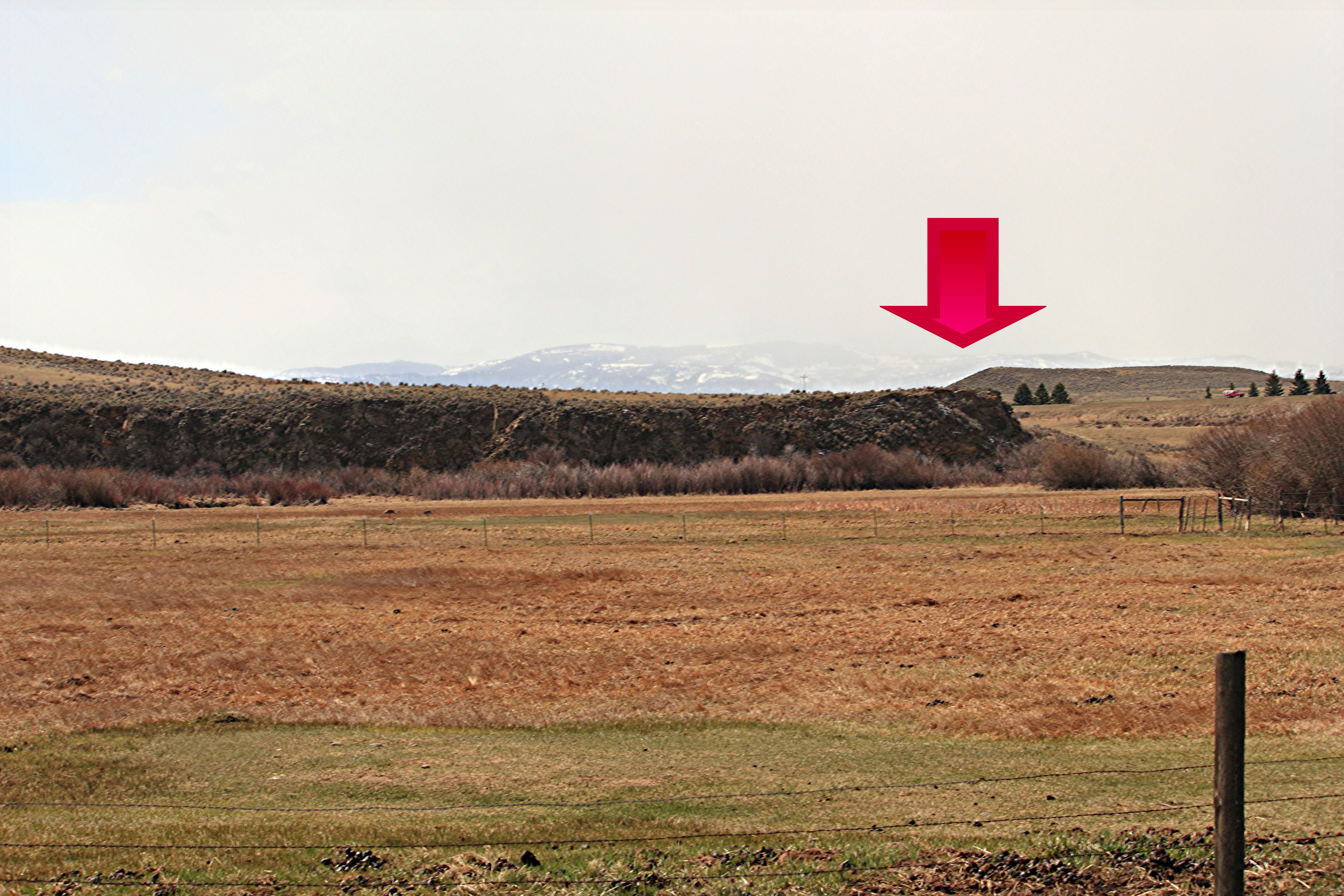
The Anzick Site (registered as 24PA506) at about the elevation of the bottom of the hillside below the arrow, is the only known Clovis burial site in North America

In 1961, while hunting marmots at a sandstone outcrop on the Anzick family property, about one mile south of Wilsall, Montana, Bill Roy Bray found a stone projectile point and bones that were covered with red ocher. In the same area, in May 1968, Ben Hargis and Calvin Sarver of Wilsall, Montana were removing talus from the same outcrop and inadvertently found the red ocher-covered partial remains of a one- to two-year-old child (Anzick-1) associated with stone (8 Clovis points, scrapers, heat treated bi-faces), bone and antler artifacts (one identifiable as elk), totaling 90. Four of the Clovis points had been reworked. Artifacts were radiocarbon dated at about 12,000 years Before Present, calibrated using the INTCAL13 standard. Nineteen additional artifacts were found in the area. Two antler rods associated with the burial also radiocarbon dated to the same time. The stone used came from 6 different quarries. In another location in the same area, not associated with the Clovis child, the men found a partial skull fragment of a 6- to 8-year-old male child (Anzick-2) that radiocarbon dated to around 8600 years Before Present. Dr. Larry Lahren, an archaeologist from Livingston, Montana was the first researcher to examine and record the site (24PA506), artifacts and human remains at the request of Ben Hargis not long after the discovery in 1968. The artifacts, not including the human remains, are held by the Montana Historical Society and the Smithsonian National Museum of Natural History.

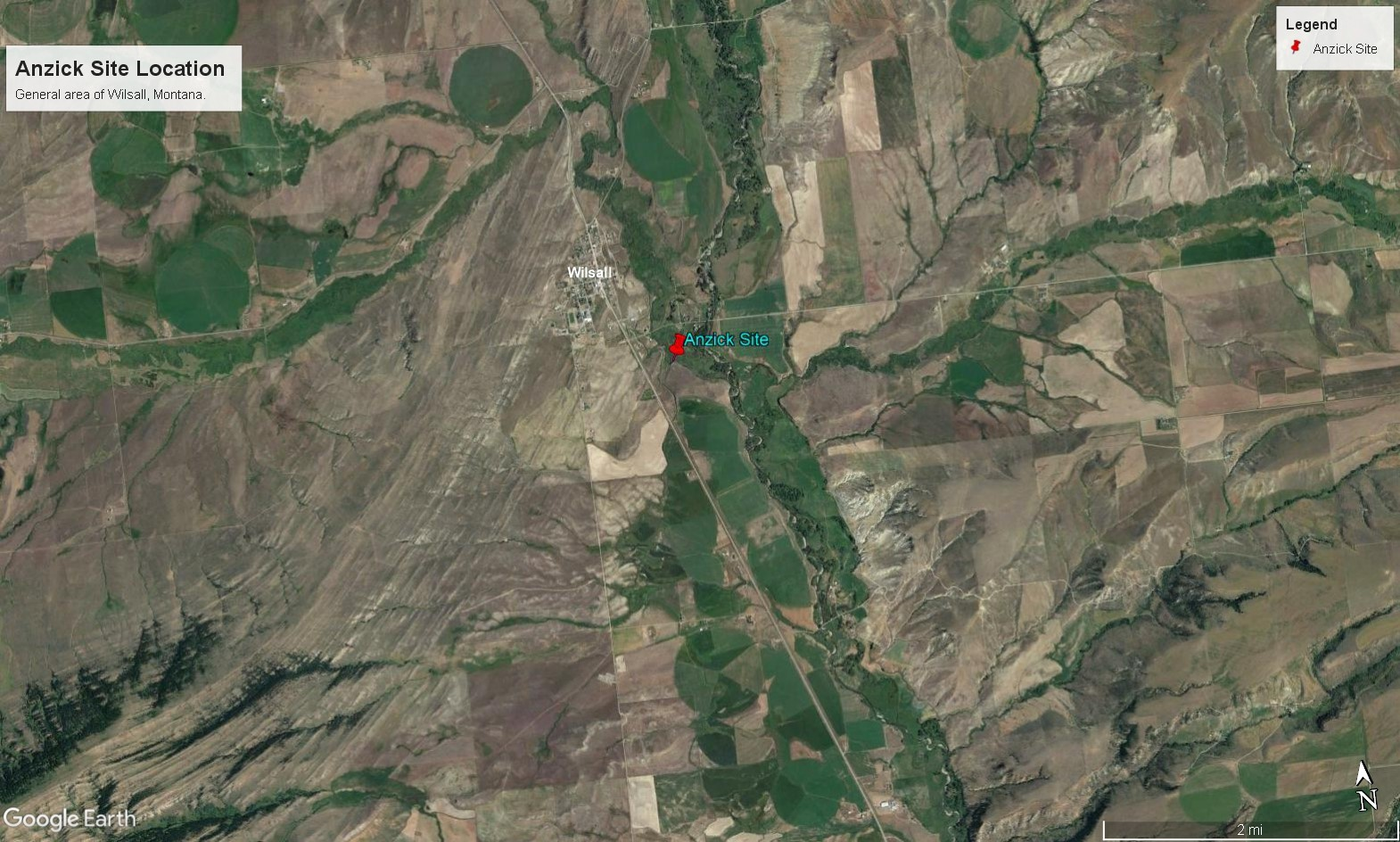
Aerial view of Wilsall and the Ansick Site

The first systematic excavation of the site was performed under the direction of Dee C. Taylor of the University of Montana in 1968. Taylor published his findings in 1969. He reported that none of the artifacts and skeletal remains had been left in-situ by Hargis and Sarver, and that soil and objects from multiple stratigraphic layers had been mixed and back-filled by the ranch owner before archaeological examination was undertaken. According to Taylor, the 90 artifacts recovered by Hargis and Sarver included items from multiple eras, leaving carbon dating as the only means of establishing the site as a Clovis-era burial.

== Human remains ==
For thirty years, the skeletal remains were in the private possession of a former investigator. In 1998, they were one of the landowners. The remains are known as Anzick-1. In 2014, the child was re-buried at an undisclosed location in the Shields Valley.

Because of the manner in which the site was discovered, its importance was initially dismissed but subsequently confirmed. Genetic studies estimate that approximately 80% of all present-day Native American populations on the two American continents are direct descendants of the Clovis boy’s family, and the remaining 20% are more closely related with the Clovis family than any other people on Earth.
