= Robson Bonnichsen =

American anthropologist

Robson Bonnichsen (3 December 1940 – 25 December 2004) was an anthropologist who undertook pioneering research in First American studies, popularized the field and founded the Center for the Study of Early Man at the University of Maine (Orono) in 1981. Dr. Bonnichsen, an associate professor of Anthropology and Quaternary studies, created the Center and served as its first director. The establishment of the Center was made possible through a generous donation by the Bingham Trust. In 1990, the name of the Center was changed to the Center for the Study of the First Americans. In 1991, Dr. Bonnichsen moved the Center from Maine to Oregon State University in Corvallis. The Center relocated to its current home at Texas A&M University in the summer of 2002 to be in a more active academic setting with new education, research, and outreach opportunities. Dr. Bonnichsen served as the Center Director until his death in December 2004. Dr. Bonnichsen and his colleagues believed that humans colonized North America long before 11,000 years ago, when people of the Clovis culture left their signature artifacts in North America.

Dr. Bonnichsen not only had the vision to establish the Center, but took it to the heights of many accomplishments. Dr. Bonnichsen convened several influential conferences that set new directions in the field, including the 1989 First World Summit Conference at the University of Maine and the 1999 international peopling of the Americas conference called “Clovis and Beyond” in Santa Fe. Dr. Bonnichsen founded the Center’s quarterly news magazine, the Mammoth Trumpet, and the Center’s annual journal, Current Research in the Pleistocene (discontinued in 2011). Dr. Bonnichsen also established the Center’s book series and published 14 books. Also during this time, he was pursuing his own pioneering research. Professor Bonnichsen was known nationally and internationally for his interdisciplinary research projects, for overview syntheses of the field, and as a spokesperson for First American studies.

== Biography ==
Bonnichsen was born in Twin Falls, Idaho. In 1965, he received his B.A. in anthropology from Idaho State University, and went on to earn his Ph.D. in anthropology from the University of Alberta in Canada, in 1974.

Bonnichsen took a multidisciplinary approach to the study of First Americans. He conducted archaeological research around the globe, both in locales where the ancestors of early Americans might have lived, such as China and Russia, and in locales in the Western Hemisphere where ancient American sites might be documented, such as Canada and South America. Bonnichsen, his colleagues and students searched for similarities in tools from these sites, and other early sites, looking for clues about the geographic origins of the humans who first made the journey to North America.

Bonnichsen was one of eight anthropologists who, in the case Bonnichsen, et al. v. United States, et al., sued for the right to study skeletal remains from Kennewick Man, which had already been radiocarbon dated to 9,300 years before the present. The anthropologists believed that the bones were a national treasure with the potential to reveal significant information about the origins of the humans who colonized North America, and that they should be closely examined and tested before being turned over to contemporary Native Americans for burial. The controversial case ended in a ruling from the U.S. 9th Circuit Court of Appeal in favor of the scientists. The ruling came on February 4, 2004, ten months before Bonnichsen died.

Bonnichsen was married several times, including to Ann Follett, with whom he had two sons, Sven and Shield, and to Mila, whose son, Max, he adopted.
