= Solutrean =

Archaeological industry of the European Upper Paleolithic

- Geographical range: Western Europe
- Period: Upper Paleolithic
- Dates: c. 22,000 – c. 17,000 BP
- Type site: Parc archéologique et botanique de Solutré
- Preceded by: Gravettian
- Followed by: Magdalenian in France, and Iberia; in the latter after a transition through the Badegoulien

Selected Solutrean sites from the ROAD database (CC BY-SA 4.0 ROCEEH)

The Solutrean /səˈljuːtriən/ industry is a relatively advanced flint tool-making style of the Upper Paleolithic of the Final Gravettian, from around 22,000 to 17,000 BP. Solutrean sites have been found in modern-day France, Spain and Portugal.

== Details ==
The term Solutrean comes from the type-site of "Cros du Charnier", dating to around 21,000 years ago and located at Solutré, in east-central France near Mâcon. The Rock of Solutré site was discovered in 1866 by the French geologist and paleontologist Henry Testot-Ferry. It is now preserved as the Parc archéologique et botanique de Solutré.

The industry was named by Gabriel de Mortillet to describe the second stage of his system of cave chronology, following the Mousterian, and he considered it synchronous with the third division of the Quaternary period. The era's finds include tools, ornamental beads, and bone pins as well as prehistoric art, much like other earlier Uppers Paleolithic cultures, and "a number of sites contain pieces of mineral pigments - red and yellow ochre, black manganese - that could have been used for face or body painting." Portable art is rare, however. According to Doctor Michael Jochim at the University of California, Santa Barbara, evidence for burials is completely lacking, and evidence of ritual practices beyond artistic expressions seems to be uncommon.

Solutrean tool-making employed techniques not seen before and not rediscovered for millennia. The Solutrean has relatively finely worked, bifacial points made with lithic reduction percussion and pressure flaking rather than flintknapping. Knapping was done using antler batons, hardwood batons and soft stone hammers. This method permitted the working of delicate slivers of flint to make light projectiles and even elaborate barbed and tanged arrowheads. Large thin spearheads; scrapers with edge not on the side but on the end; flint knives and saws, but all still chipped, not ground or polished; long spear-points, with tang and shoulder on one side only, are also characteristic implements of this industry. Bone and antler were used as well.

The Solutrean may be seen as a transitional stage between the flint implements of the Mousterian and the bone implements of the Magdalenian epochs. Faunal finds include horses, reindeer, ibex, mammoths, cave lions, rhinoceroses, bears and aurochs. Solutrean finds have also been made in the caves of Les Eyzies and Laugerie-Haute, and in the Lower Beds of Creswell Crags in Derbyshire, England (Proto-Solutrean). The industry first appeared in what is now Spain, and disappears from the archaeological record around 17,000 BP.

== Physical characteristics ==
Examination of physical remains from the Solutrean period has determined that they were of a slightly more gracile type than the preceding Gravettian culture. Males were rather tall, with some skeletons being up to 179 cm tall. Volume 4 of the Portuguese Magazine of Archaeology from 2001 examined a Solutrean female individual whose physical remains are described as "having postcranial elements that derive from a relatively small and gracile individual". The teeth of Solutrean individuals are described as being similar in appearance to those belonging to the people of the Gravettian.

== Genetics ==
Analysis of genomics of Solutrean-related individuals has found that they are unrelated to ancient or modern Native Americans and are instead related to earlier Western European Cro-Magnons, particularly earlier Gravettian-producing individuals from France and Spain, as well to the producers of the subsequent Magdalenian culture. It has been found that Solutreans are also closely related to Aurignacians.

== Solutrean hypothesis in North American archaeology ==
The Solutrean hypothesis argues that people from Europe may have been among the earliest settlers of the Americas. Its notable recent proponents include Dennis Stanford of the Smithsonian Institution and Bruce Bradley of the University of Exeter. This hypothesis contrasts with the mainstream archaeological consensus that the North American continent was first populated by people from Asia, either by the Bering land bridge (i.e. Beringia) at least 13,500 years ago, or by maritime travel along the Pacific coast, or by both. The idea of a Clovis-Solutrean link remains controversial and does not enjoy wide acceptance. The hypothesis is challenged by large gaps in time between the Clovis culture and Solutrean eras, a lack of evidence of Solutrean seafaring, lack of specific Solutrean features and tools in Clovis technology, the difficulties of the route, and other issues.

In 2014, the autosomal DNA of a male infant (Anzick-1) from a 12,500-year-old deposit in Montana was sequenced. The skeleton was found in close association with several Clovis artifacts. Comparisons showed strong affinities with DNA from Siberian sites, and virtually ruled out any close affinity of Anzick-1 with European sources. The DNA of the Anzick-1 sample showed strong affinities with sampled Native American populations, which indicated that the samples derive from an ancient population that lived in or near Siberia, the Upper Paleolithic Mal'ta population.

== Gallery ==
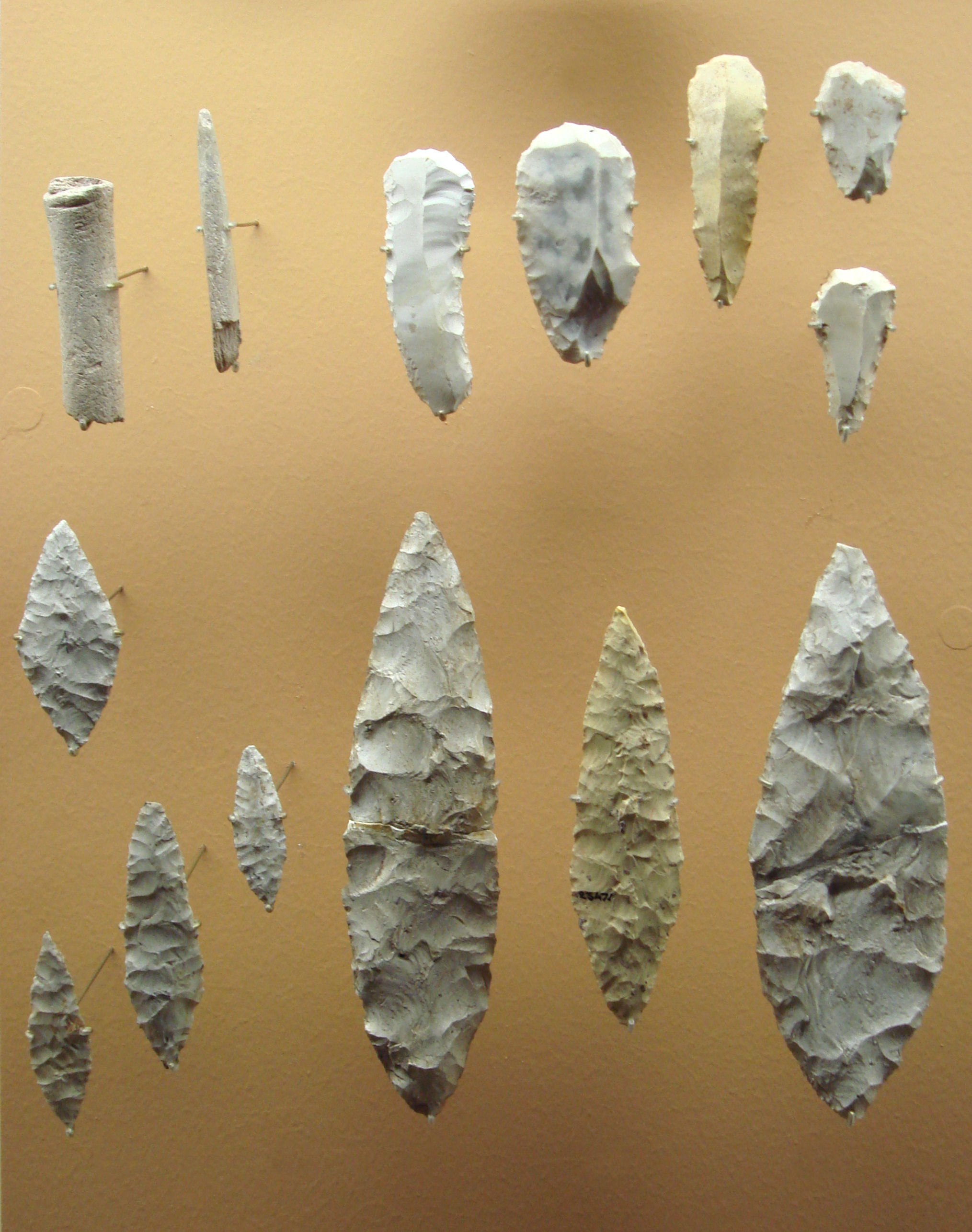
Solutrean tools, 22,000–17,000 BP, Crot du Charnier, Solutré-Pouilly, Saône-et-Loire, France

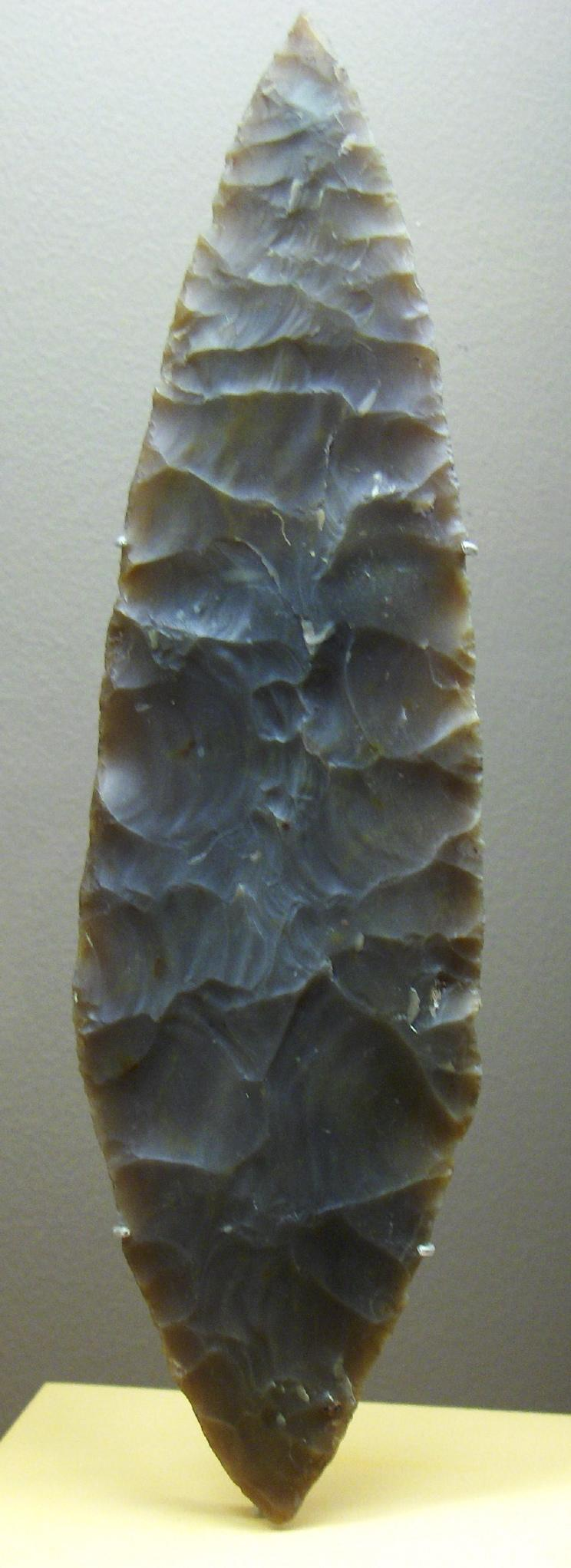
Flint point from Volgu in the National Archeological Museum in France

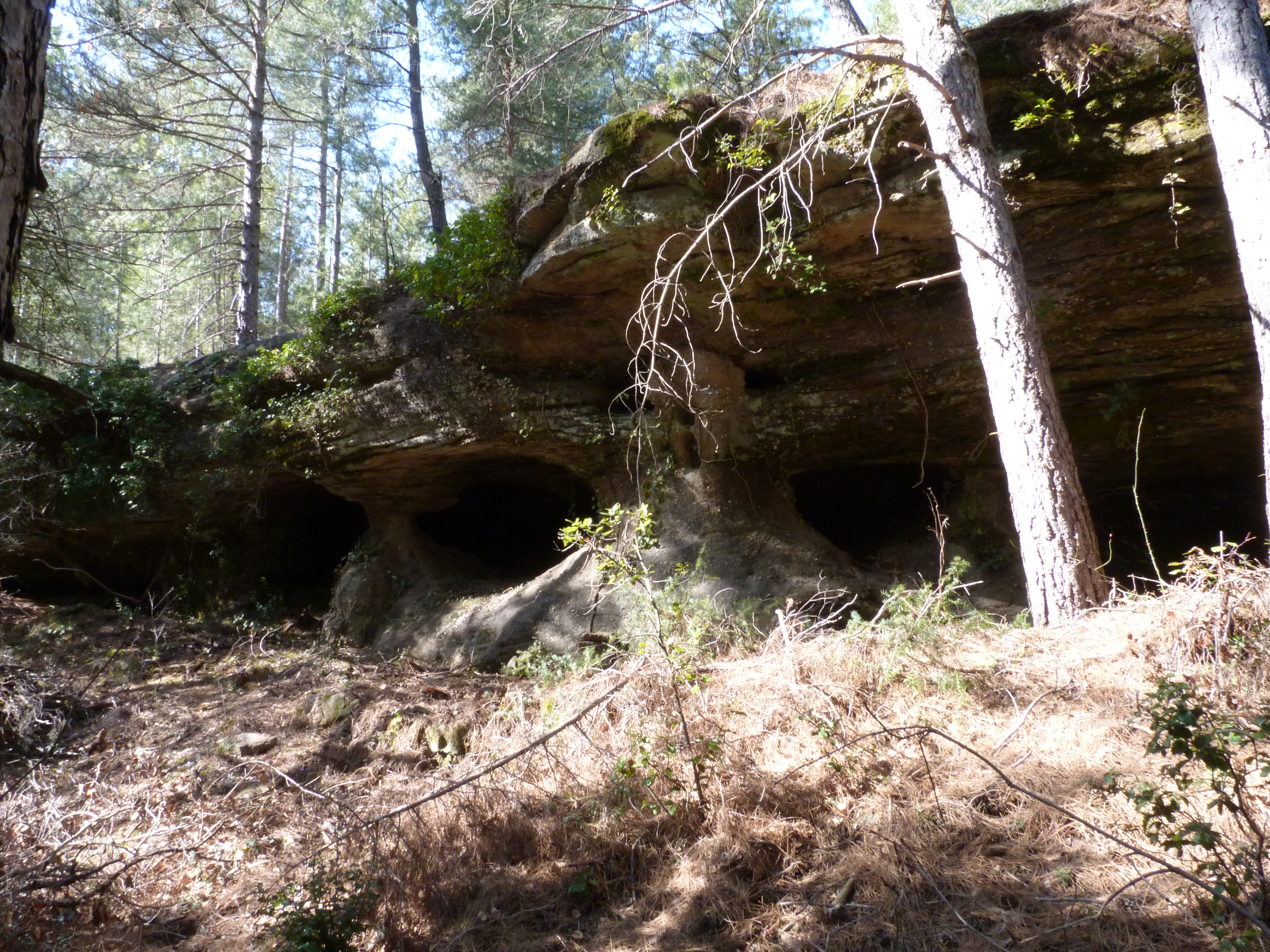
Solutrean caves in Aujac, Gard

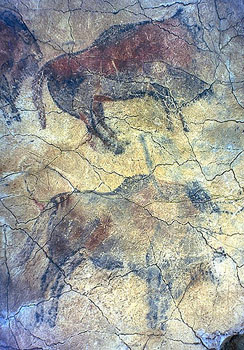
Solutrean cave art at Altamira

== See also ==
Preceded by Gravettian	Solutrean; 22,000–17,000 BP	Succeeded by Magdalenian

- Franco-Cantabrian region
- Gravettian
- Last Glacial Maximum
- Last Glacial Maximum refugia
