= Kennewick Man =

Ancient skeleton of Indigenous American man

Coordinates: 46°13′34.2″N 119°10′20.3″W

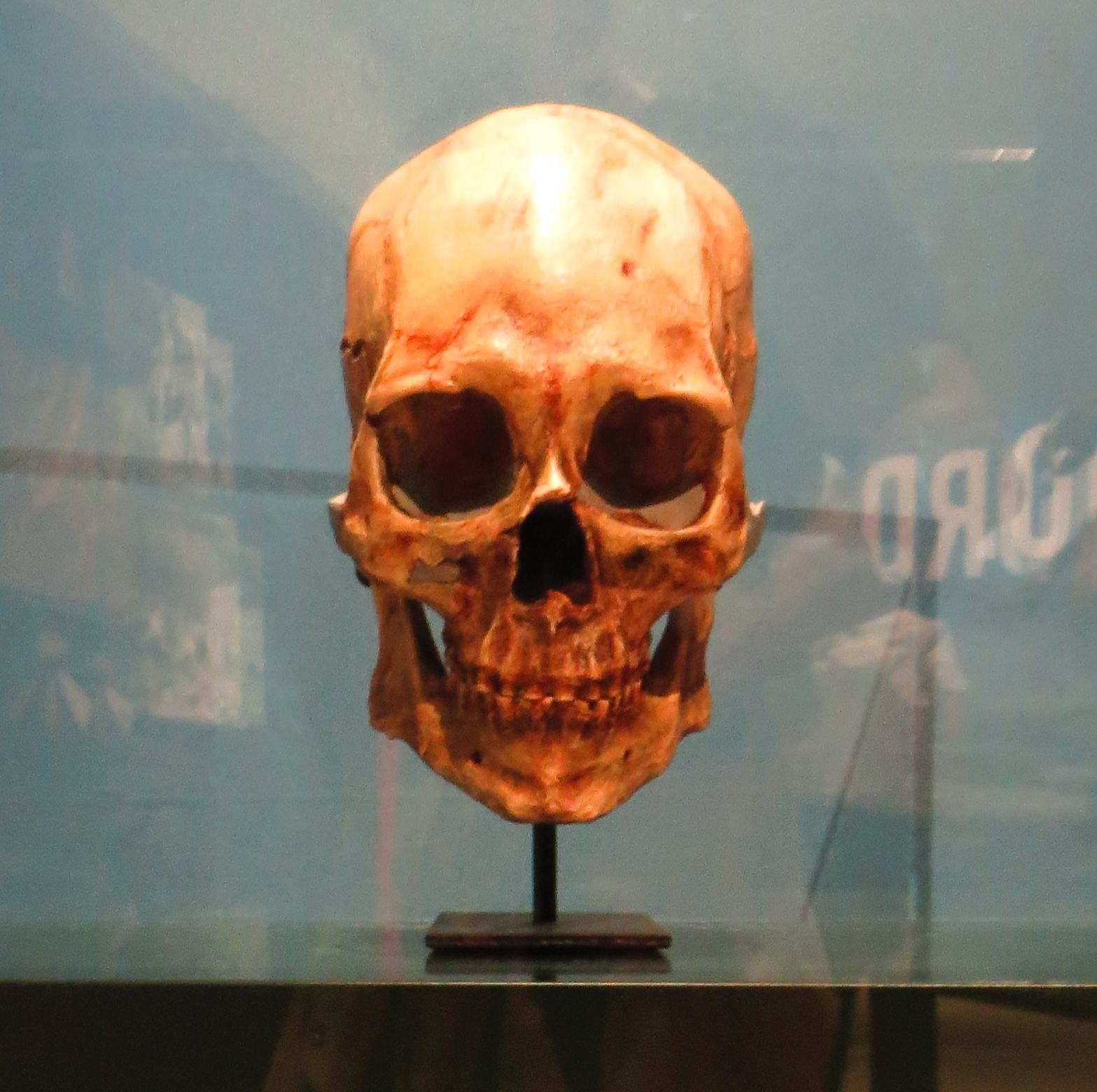
- Replica skull of Kennewick Man. Resin cast by James Chatters
- Common name: Kennewick Man
- Species: Homo sapiens
- Age: 8,400 to 8,690 years Before Present
- Place discovered: Columbia Park in Kennewick, Washington
- Date discovered: July 28, 1996
- Discovered by: Will Thomas and David Deacy

Kennewick Man or Ancient One (Note: His historical name is unknown. Monikers were invented as a means of identification. The name "Kennewick Man" follows the practice of naming a discovery after the place it was found. The Indian name "Ancient One" began to be used as early as the year 2000.) was a Native American man who lived during the early Holocene whose skeletal remains were found in 1996 washed out on a bank of the Columbia River near Kennewick, Washington. Radiocarbon tests show the man lived about 8,400 to 8,700 years ago, making his skeleton one of the most complete ever found this old in the Americas, and thus of high scientific interest for understanding the peopling of the Americas. (Note: "Scientists have found only about 50 skeletons of such antiquity, most of them fragmentary. Any new find can thus add crucial insight into the ongoing mystery of who first colonized the New World.")

The discovery precipitated a nearly twenty-year-long dispute involving the Federal government, Native Americans, and scientists who wanted to study the remains. The Federal government, through the United States Army Corps of Engineers, held jurisdiction over the land where the remains were found and, thus, had legal custody. However, Native American tribes asserted legal rights to rebury the man under the Native American Graves Protection and Repatriation Act (NAGPRA), a federal law to repatriate Indian remains. Nevertheless, some members of the scientific community believed it was essential to conduct research on the skeleton and asserted he was only distantly related to today's Native Americans and was more closely related to Polynesian or Southeast Asian peoples, which would exempt the case from NAGPRA.

The controversial case wound its way through courts for many years, including a period when scientists won access to study the remains. At the same time, technology for analyzing ancient DNA had been steadily improving. In 2015, scientists at the University of Copenhagen published a study which found that in comparison to contemporary human populations, Kennewick Man's genome is closest to that of modern Native Americans, though he is not associated with any specific modern tribe. In 2016, Congress passed legislation to return the remains to a coalition of Columbia basin tribes. Kennewick Man was reburied according to tribal traditions on February 18, 2017, with 200 members of five Columbia basin tribes in attendance, at an undisclosed location in the area. Within the scientific community since the 1990s, arguments for a non-Indian ancient history of the Americas, including by ancient peoples from Europe, have been losing ground in the face of ancient DNA analysis. The establishment of Kennewick Man's genetic affinity with modern Native Americans symbolically marked the "end of a [supposed] non-Indian ancient North America".

== Discovery ==
The individual who became known as Kennewick Man was discovered by accident by two college students, Will Thomas and David Deacy, on July 28, 1996. They were watching a hydroplane race on the Columbia River near Kennewick, Washington, in the northwestern United States. Thomas was wading in about 50 cm (20 in) of water, about 3 m (10 ft) from shore, when his foot struck something hard and round. He reached down and pulled up a human skull.

Thomas and Deacy placed the skull in bushes until the race was over. They then found a plastic bucket, retrieved the skull and took it to a Kennewick police officer. Police returned with them to the site and found more bones underwater and along the shore. The Benton County coroner determined that the remains were not from a recent death and asked archaeologist James Chatters to examine them.

Over ten visits to the site during the following month, Chatters and others recovered about 90% of the skeleton. Despite having been scattered, the remains were unusually complete and well preserved for their age. The skull and jaw were nearly complete, and even parts of the hands and feet survived. All of his permanent teeth had been present when he died, although two wisdom teeth were lost after death and were not recovered.

== Scientific analysis ==
=== Description and age ===
Chatters concluded it was "a male of late middle age (40–55 years), and tall (170 to 176 cm, 5′7″ to 5′9″), and was fairly muscular with a slender build". The Owsley team in 2005 reported he may have been as young as 38 at the time of death.

A small bone fragment submitted to the University of California, Riverside, for radiocarbon dating estimated he lived between 9,300 and 9,600 years ago (8,400 uncalibrated "radiocarbon years"), and not the 19th century, as had originally been thought. Subsequent radiocarbon dating indicated a somewhat younger age of 8,900 to 9,000 years BP, and later 8,400 to 8,690 calibrated years Before Present.

=== Geography ===
Measurements of carbon, nitrogen, and oxygen isotope ratios in the bone collagen indicate that the man lived almost exclusively on a diet of marine mammals for the last 20 or so years of his life and that the water he drank was glacial melt. The closest marine coastal environment where this water could have been found during his lifetime was in Alaska. That, combined with the location of the find, led to the conclusion that the individual led a highly mobile, water-borne lifestyle centered on the northern coast.

=== Injuries ===
Forensic anthropologist Douglas Owsley, who later led the scientific team that examined Kennewick Man's skeleton in 2005, discovered that the bones in Kennewick Man's arms were bent. Owsley theorized that this was the result of powerful muscles built up over the course of a lifetime of hunting and spearfishing.

Owsley also found that Kennewick Man had arthritis in his right elbow, both of his knees, and several vertebrae but not severe enough to be crippling. Kennewick Man had suffered some trauma in his lifetime, which was evident by a fractured rib that had healed, a depression fracture on his forehead, and a similar indentation on the left side of the head, and a spear jab that healed.

=== Genetic and cultural origins ===
Chatters, who initially investigated the skeleton, early on concluded that the "presence of Caucasoid traits [and a] lack of definitive Native-American characteristics", as well as the apparent context of the skeleton as part of an early Paleo-American group led him to state that the body was "Caucasian", an anthropological term that referred to bone structure not skin color or European origin.

Scientists attempted DNA analysis within a few years of discovery, but reported "available technology and protocols do not allow the analysis of ancient DNA from these remains" ie. multiple experts were unable to extract enough DNA for analysis.

Chatters et al. (2000) conducted a graphic comparison, including size, of Kennewick Man to eighteen modern populations. They found Kennewick Man to be most closely related to the Ainu, a recognized indigenous people of Northern Japan. However, when size was excluded as a factor, no association to any population was established. In 2001, Chatters wrote that the "craniofacial characteristics of Paleo-Americans, Asians, and early Europeans, loosely resemble the Ainu, Polynesian, and Australian peoples", but that no group was the major contributor to the Paleo-American gene pool. Anthropologist C. Loring Brace maintained in a 2006 interview that, by his analysis, Kennewick Man was "likely related" to the Ainu of Japan.

Anthropologist Joseph Powell of the University of New Mexico was also allowed to examine the remains. Powell used craniometric data obtained by anthropologist William White Howells of Harvard University and anthropologist Tsunehiko Hanihara of Saga University; this had the advantage of including data drawn from Asian and North American populations. Powell said that Kennewick Man was not European but most resembled the Ainu and Polynesians. Powell said that the Ainu descend from the Jōmon people, an East Asian population with "closest biological affinity with south-east Asians rather than western Eurasian peoples". Powell said that dental analysis showed the skull to have a 94-percent consistency with being of a Sundadont group like the Ainu and Polynesians and only a 48-percent consistency with being of a Sinodont group like that of North Asia. Powell said analysis of the skull showed it to be "unlike American Indians and Europeans". Powell concluded that the remains were "clearly not a Caucasoid unless Ainu and Polynesians are considered Caucasoid".

Later studies criticised claims made about the ancestry of the Kennewick Man purely based on skull morphology, noting that a single skull is too small a sample size to accurately determine affinities with any degree of certainty, and that the Kennewick Man's skull morphology falls within the variation of known Native American skulls.

Advances in genetic research made it possible to analyze ancient DNA (aDNA) more accurately than earlier attempts when the skeleton was found. In June 2015, a study was published which analysed his sequenced nuclear genome, which concluded that his genome was nested within the diversity of contemporary Native Americans. The study concluded Kennewick Man belonged to a population closely related to contemporary Native Americans in the Pacific Northwest, including Confederated Tribes of the Colville Reservation. Of the five tribes that originally claimed Kennewick Man as an ancestor, their members were the only ones to donate DNA samples for evaluation. The low sequencing depth (approximately 1x) of the Kennewick Man's genome, along with a lack of genomes from North American aboriginal populations have made it impossible to ascertain Kennewick Man's nearest living relatives among regional Native American tribes. His Y-DNA haplogroup is Q-M3 and his mitochondrial DNA is X2a, both uniparental genetic markers found almost exclusively in Native Americans.

=== Burial ===
When Kennewick Man was discovered, he had been buried for about 8,500 years. Erosion of the Columbia River bank had disturbed the original burial, washing bones and fragments into shallow water and mud along more than 30 m (98 ft) of shoreline. Most of the larger bones were found within an area about 12 m (39 ft) long. No bones remained in their original position in the ground, and no clear outline of the grave could be seen.

Kennewick Man had been buried deliberately. By examining the calcium carbonate left behind as underground water collected on the underside of the bones and then evaporated, scientists were able to conclude that Kennewick Man was lying on his back with his feet rolled slightly outward and his arms at his side, with the palms facing down, a position that could not have been accidental.

No grave goods or other objects were recovered in secure association with Kennewick Man's burial. There were objects around him, however. At and near the discovery site on the Columbia River, researchers found relatively recent debris, including pieces of ceramic and glass, rusted metal, nails and horseshoes. Stone flakes, fire-cracked rock, mussel shell and other older archaeological material were also found nearby. Later investigation determined that these objects were not associated with Kennewick Man.

One object was different. A broken stone projectile point was embedded in his right ilium, part of the pelvis. The surviving piece was about 6 mm (0.2 in) thick and had been made from a fine-grained gray volcanic stone, probably andesite or dacite. Bone had grown around the point, showing that the injury had healed. Chatters identified it as a Cascade point, although that identification was later disputed.

Because the original burial had already been disturbed before its discovery in 1996, it is not known whether clothing, grave goods or other objects had originally been buried with him.

== Scientific initiatives and significance ==
=== Scientific initiatives ===
There have been three major scientific initiatives to study and report on Kennewick Man.

Between 1998 and 2000, the Department of the Interior and National Park Service, in cooperation with the Corps of Engineers, the federal agency responsible for the Kennewick remains, conducted a series of scientific examinations of the remains. Eighteen nationally and internationally recognized scientists and scholars conducted a variety of historical and scientific examinations, analyses, tests, and studies. Nevertheless, the "analysis was quickly suspended by the U.S. government" because of the controversy over custodianship of the remains.

After the suspension of the government studies, anthropologists sued the government, and in 2002 won the right to study the bones. For the next six years beginning in 2005, Douglas Owsley of the Smithsonian Institution coordinated more than a dozen experts, who analyzed the bones in numerous ways including forensic anthropology, physical anthropology, and isotope chemistry. Their report was published in 2014, in the book titled Kennewick Man, The Scientific Investigation of an Ancient American Skeleton.

In 2015, a paper in Nature titled "The Ancestry and Affiliations of Kennewick Man" analyzed ancient DNA from Kennewick Man, and determined he is associated with modern day Indians.

=== Scientific significance ===
According to Time magazine, "Scientists have found only about 50 skeletons of such antiquity, most of them fragmentary. Any new find can thus add crucial insight into the ongoing mystery of who first colonized the New World."

Since the mid-1990s, a debate in the scientific community has centered on the identity of the first peoples of the Americas, involving two competing concepts: "Palaeoindian" and "Palaeoamerican". The "Palaeoindian" model asserts that the earliest inhabitants are the ancestors of modern Native Americans, while the "Palaeoamerican" model posits that they were an unrelated group, possibly an extinct Asian lineage or even European migrants. Genetic analysis of Kennewick Man and other ancient skeletons has played a significant role in challenging the Palaeoamerican theories. The DNA findings from Kennewick Man have been described as marking an "end of a... non-Indian ancient North America."

The discovery of Kennewick Man, along with other ancient skeletons, has furthered scientific debate over the origin and history of early Native American people. One hypothesis holds that a single source of migration occurred, consisting of hunters and gatherers following large herds of game who wandered across the Bering land bridge. An alternative hypothesis is that more than one source population was involved in migration immediately following the Last Glacial Maximum (LGM), which occurred ~22k to ~18k years BP, and that the land migration through Beringia was either preceded by or roughly synchronous with a waterborne migration from coastal Asia.

The similarity of some ancient skeletal remains in the Americas, such as Kennewick Man, to coastal Asian phenotypes is suggestive of more than one migration source. Classification of DNA from ancient skeletons such as Kennewick Man and others of similar phenotype may or may not reveal genetic affiliation between them, with either Beringian or coastal Asian source populations.

Regardless of the debate over whether there were more than one source of migration following the LGM, Kennewick Man has yielded insight into the marine lifestyle and mobility of early coastal migrants.

=== Owsley study criticisms ===
In 2012, Burke Museum archeologists voiced concern and criticism of the Owsley team's preliminary findings (not published fully until 2014). First, it was noted that no one outside of Owsley's team had an opportunity to examine the Smithsonian's data to see how the team reached its conclusions. Second, the absence of peer-reviewed articles published prior to Owsley unveiling the bones' "secrets" was criticized. Third, Owsley's non-Native argument hinged on the assumption that Kennewick Man's skull was a reliable means of assessing ancestry. This was a "nineteenth-century skull science paradigm", said David Hurst Thomas, a curator at the American Museum of Natural History. Skulls are no longer used as the basis for classifying remains, as DNA evidence is more reliable.

=== Racial issues ===
In 2005, author Jack Hitt wrote an essay "Mighty White of You: Racial Preferences Color America's Oldest Skulls and Bones", in which he describes a systemic "racial preference" for Kennewick Man, and other old skeletons, to be of European origin. If this theory held true (and DNA evidence shows it does not), it would turn the tables on Indian claims of being the first inhabitants, white Europeans would be the victims of Indian invaders, and politically modern Indians would have less claim to sovereignty.

The use of the word "Caucasoid" to describe Kennewick Man, and his facial reconstruction that appeared plausibly European, were taken by many to mean that Kennewick Man was "Caucasian", European, or "white", rather than an ancestor of present-day Native Americans, although the term "Caucasoid" had also been applied to the Ainu of northern Japan. In 1998, The New York Times reported "White supremacist groups are among those who used Kennewick Man to claim that Caucasians came to America well before Native Americans." Additionally, Asatru Folk Assembly, a racialist neopagan organization, sued to have the bones genetically tested before it was adjudicated that Kennewick Man was an ancestor of present-day Native Americans.

== Custody of Kennewick Man ==
In October 1998, the remains were deposited at the Burke Museum at the University of Washington. The Burke Museum was the court-appointed neutral repository for the remains, and did not exhibit them. They were then still legally the property of the US Army Corps of Engineers, as they were found on land under its custody.

According to NAGPRA, if human remains are found on federal lands and their cultural affiliation to a Native American tribe can be established, the affiliated tribe may claim them. Two months after discovery in 1996, the Umatilla tribe requested custody of the remains so they could be reburied according to tribal tradition. It was contested by researchers who believed Kennewick Man was not affiliated with modern Indians. The Umatilla argued that their oral history goes back 10,000 years, and they had been present on the territory since the dawn of time. Native American tribes asserted that the claims that Kennewick Man was of non-Indian origin was an attempt to evade the law governing custodianship of ancient bones. The Corps of Engineers and the Clinton administration supported the Native American claim in what became a long-running lawsuit.

Robson Bonnichsen and seven other anthropologists sued the United States for the right to conduct research. The anthropologists won the case in 2002, and on February 4, 2004, the United States Court of Appeals for the Ninth Circuit panel rejected an appeal brought by the United States Army Corps of Engineers and the Umatilla, Colville, Yakama, Nez Perce, and other tribes on the grounds that they were unable to show sufficient evidence of kinship. Furthermore, the presiding judge found that the US government had acted in bad faith and awarded attorney's fees of $2,379,000 to the plaintiffs.

On April 7, 2005, during the 109th Congress, United States senator John McCain introduced an amendment to NAGPRA, which (section 108) would have changed the definition of "Native American" from being that which "is indigenous to the United States" to "is or was indigenous to the United States". However, the 109th Congress concluded without enacting the bill. By the bill's definition, Kennewick Man would have been classified as Native American regardless of whether any link to a contemporary tribe could be found.

=== Burial locations ===
About a year after the discovery on the banks of the Columbia River, Kennewick Man's original burial site was "preserved for future scientific study" by the Corps of Engineers when they dropped 2,000 tons of rocks and dirt onto the site by helicopter, then planted thick stands of trees and bamboo on top. Questions were raised by 60 Minutes and Chatters about the heavy damage to the site and motivation of the Corps for making it so inaccessible. The precise coordinates have been removed from official records, although contemporary news videos and reports give an approximate sense of where it was.

In September 2016, in light of new DNA evidence associating Kennewick Man with modern day Native Americans, the 114th US House and Senate passed legislation to return the ancient bones to a coalition of Columbia Basin tribes. The coalition included the Confederated Tribes of the Colville Reservation, the Confederated Tribes and Bands of the Yakama Nation, the Nez Perce Tribe, the Confederated Tribes of the Umatilla Reservation, and the Wanapum Band of Priest Rapids.

The remains of Kennewick Man were cataloged and removed from the Burke Museum on February 17, 2017. The following day, more than 200 members of five Columbia Plateau tribes were present at a burial of the remains, according to their traditions, at an undisclosed location.

== See also ==
- Archaeology of the Americas
- Archeological sites
  - Calico Early Man Site
  - Fort Rock Cave
  - Marmes Rockshelter
  - Mummy Cave
  - Paisley Caves
- Cueva de las Manos – (Cave paintings)
- Genetic history of indigenous peoples of the Americas
- Human remains
  - Anzick-1
  - Arlington Springs Man
  - Buhl Woman
  - Kwäday Dän Ts'ìnchi
  - Leanderthal Lady
  - Luzia Woman
  - Naia
  - Windover Archaeological Site
- List of unsolved deaths
- Repatriation and reburial of human remains
- Settlement of the Americas
- Adeline Fredin

== Sources ==
- Berryman, Hugh (2014). "Postmortem breakage as a taphonomic tool for determining burial position". In Owsley, Douglas W.; Jantz, Richard L. (eds.). Kennewick Man, The Scientific Investigation of an Ancient American Skeleton. College Station: Texas A&M University Press. ISBN 978-1623492007.
- Brace, C. Loring; Brace, Mary L.; Nelson, A. Russel; Qifeng, Pan; Sequchi, Noriko; Umeda, Hideyuki; Wilson, Margaret (2014). "The Ainu and Jōmon connection". In Owsley, Douglas W.; Jantz, Richard L. (eds.). Kennewick Man, The Scientific Investigation of an Ancient American Skeleton. College Station: Texas A&M University Press. ISBN 978-1623492007.
- Brenner, Joan Coltrain; Dixon, E. James; Edgar, J. H. Heather; Farmer, G. Lang; Fifield, Terence E.; Heaton, Timothy H.; Kemp, Brian M.; Lee, Craig M.; Owsley, Douglas W.; Parrish, Eric; Smith, David G.; Turner, Christy; Worl, Rosita K. (2014). "Evidence of maritime adaptation and coastal migration from southeast Alaska". In Owsley, Douglas W.; Jantz, Richard L. (eds.). Kennewick Man, The Scientific Investigation of an Ancient American Skeleton. College Station: Texas A&M University Press. ISBN 978-1623492007.
- Chatters, James C. (2000). "The Recovery and First Analysis of an Early Holocene Human". American Antiquity. 65 (2): 291–316. doi:10.2307/2694060. JSTOR 2694060. PMID 17216899. S2CID 6601530.
- Chatters, James C. (2001). Ancient Encounters: Kennewick Man and the First Americans. New York: Simon & Schuster. ISBN 068485936X.
- Chatters, James C. (2004). "Kennewick Man". Arctic Studies Center at the National Museum of Natural History. Smithsonian Institution, US. Archived from the original on 2012-06-16. "Originally published in the "Newsletter of the American Anthropological Association""
- Chatters, James C. (2014). "Occupational stress markings and patterns of injury". In Owsley, Douglas W.; Jantz, Richard L. (eds.). Kennewick Man, The Scientific Investigation of an Ancient American Skeleton. College Station: Texas A&M University Press. ISBN 978-1623492007.
- Chatters, James C.; Chisholm, Brian; Knyf, Martin; Longstaffe, Fred J.; Owsley, Douglas W.; Schwarcz, Henry P.; Stafford, Thomas W. (2014). "Stable isotope evidence for diet and origin". In Owsley, Douglas W.; Jantz, Richard L. (eds.). Kennewick Man, The Scientific Investigation of an Ancient American Skeleton. College Station: Texas A&M University Press. ISBN 978-1623492007.
- Cook, Della Collins (2014). "The natural shocks that flesh is heir to". In Owsley, Douglas W.; Jantz, Richard L. (eds.). Kennewick Man, The Scientific Investigation of an Ancient American Skeleton. College Station: Texas A&M University Press. ISBN 978-1623492007.
- Custred, Glynn (2000). "The Forbidden Discovery of Kennewick Man". Academic Questions. 13 (3): 12–30. doi:10.1007/s12129-000-1034-8 (inactive July 12, 2025). S2CID 143256888.
- Hitt, Jack (2010) [2005]. "Mighty White of You". The Best Of The Best American Science Writing. Ecco. ISBN 978-0-06-187500-7.. Reprinted from Harper's Magazine, July 2005.
- Kirkpatrick, Katherine (2011). "Discovery". Mysterious Bones: The Story of Kennewick Man. Holiday House. ISBN 9780823421879.
- Lemonick, Michael D.; Dorfman, Andrew (March 13, 2006). "Who Were the First Americans?" (PDF). Time.
- Owsley, Douglas L.; Stafford, Thomas W.; Williams, Aleitha A. (2014). "Taphonomic indicators of burial context". In Owsley, Douglas W.; Jantz, Richard L. (eds.). Kennewick Man, The Scientific Investigation of an Ancient American Skeleton. College Station: Texas A&M University Press. ISBN 978-1623492007.
- Phillips, Melissa Lee (July 6, 2005). "Scientists finally study Kennewick Man". BBC News.
- Owsley, Douglas W.; Jantz, Richard L., eds. (2014). Kennewick Man, The Scientific Investigation of an Ancient American Skeleton. College Station: Texas A&M University Press. ISBN 978-1623492007.
- Preston, Douglas (September 2014). "The Kennewick Man Finally Freed to Share His Secrets". Smithsonian.
- Stang, John (July 29, 1996). "Skull found on shore of Columbia". Tri-City Herald. Archived from the original on 2003-10-23.
- Stang, John (November 2, 2012). "Burke archaeologist challenges Smithsonian over Kennewick Man". Crosscut.com.
- Stafford, Thomas W. (2014). "Chronology of the Kennewick Man skeleton". In Owsley, Douglas W.; Jantz, Richard L. (eds.). Kennewick Man, The Scientific Investigation of an Ancient American Skeleton. College Station: Texas A&M University Press. ISBN 978-1623492007.

== Bibliography ==
- "Mystery of the First Americans" transcript of NOVA program. Air date February 15, 2000.
- "Skeleton from Kennewick, Washington." American Antiquity, vol. 65, no. 2. (Apr. 2000), pp. 291–316. May 11, 2007.
