= Solutré-Pouilly =

- Commune
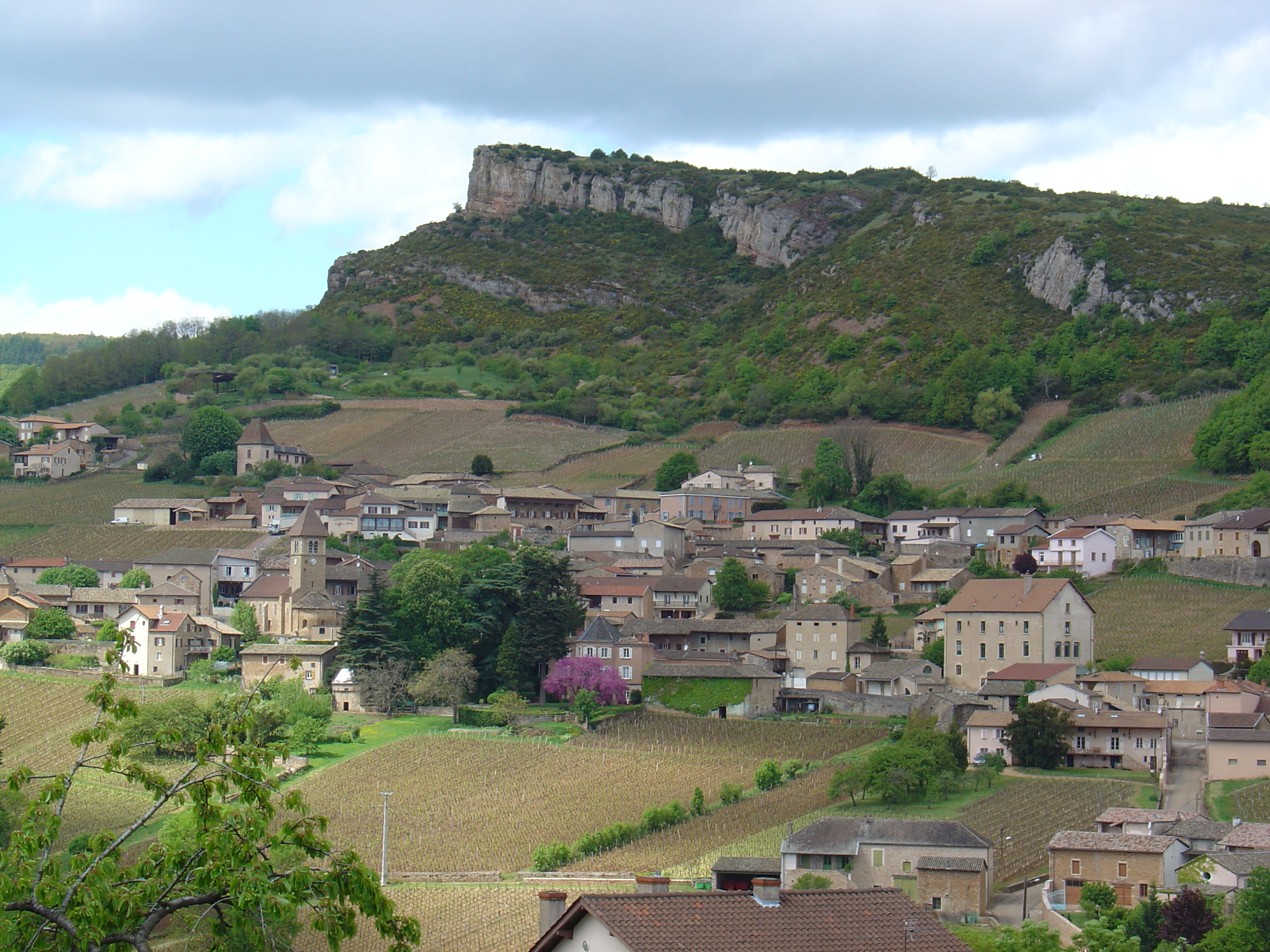
- A general view of Solutré-Pouilly
- Location of Solutré-Pouilly
- Location within France Location within Bourgogne-Franche-Comté
- Coordinates: 46°17′47″N 4°43′29″E
- Country: France
- Region: Bourgogne-Franche-Comté
- Department: Saône-et-Loire
- Arrondissement: Mâcon
- Canton: La Chapelle-de-Guinchay
- Intercommunality: Mâconnais Beaujolais Agglomération

Government
  - Mayor (2023–2026): Alban Vossion
- Area^{1}: 6.16 km^{2} (2.38 sq mi)
- Elevation: 400 m (1,300 ft)
- Highest elevation: 530 m (1,740 ft)
- Lowest elevation: 208 m (682 ft)
- Population (2023): 331
  - Density: 53.7/km^{2} (139/sq mi)
- Time zone: UTC+01:00 (CET)
  - Summer (DST): UTC+02:00 (CEST)
- INSEE/Postal code: 71526 /71960
- ^{1} French Land Register data, which excludes lakes, ponds, glaciers > 1 km^{2} (0.386 sq mi or 247 acres) and river estuaries.

Solutré-Pouilly (French pronunciation: [sɔlytʁe puji]; Arpitan: Selutrié-Polyié) is a commune in the Saône-et-Loire department in the region of Bourgogne-Franche-Comté in eastern France. It is known for a local geological feature, the Rock of Solutré.

== Wine ==
The vineyards of Solutré-Pouilly are part of the appellation d'origine contrôlée Pouilly-Fuissé. Local wineries include the Domaine du Chalet Pouilly.

== Points of interest ==
- Parc archéologique et botanique de Solutré

== See also ==
- Solutrean, the Paleolithic style named after a site near the village.
- Communes of the Saône-et-Loire department
- Rock of Solutré
