= Dennis Stanford =

American archaeologist (1943–2019)

- Born: Dennis J. Stanford; May 13, 1943; Cherokee, Iowa, United States
- Died: April 24, 2019 (aged 75); Georgetown, Washington D.C., United States
- Occupation: Archaeologist and Museum Curator

Dennis J. Stanford (13 May 1943 in Cherokee, Iowa – 24 April 2019) was an archaeologist and Director of the Paleoindian/Paleoecology Program at the National Museum of Natural History at the Smithsonian Institution.

Along with Professor Bruce Bradley, Stanford was known for investigating the Solutrean hypothesis, which contends that stone tool technology of the Solutrean culture in prehistoric northern Spain and Portugal may have influenced the development of later Clovis tool-making culture in the Americas by way of an earlier trans-atlantic maritime travel along a sea ice shelf to North America during the Last Glacial Maximum. In 2012, they published details concerning their hypothesis in Across Atlantic Ice: The Origin of America's Clovis Culture.
