= Anzick-1 =

Paleo-Indian male infant remains found in Montana, US

Anzick Boy
- Common name: Anzick Boy
- Species: Homo sapiens
- Age: 12,990–12,840 years BP
- Place discovered: Near Wilsall, Montana, U.S.
- Date discovered: 1968

Anzick-1 was a young (1–2 years old) Paleoindian child whose remains were found in south central Montana, United States, in 1968. He has been dated to 12,990–12,840 years BP. The child was found with more than 115 tools made of stone and antlers and dusted with red ochre, suggesting a deliberate burial. Anzick-1 is the only human whose remains are associated with the Clovis culture, and his is the first ancient Native American genome to be fully sequenced.

Paleogenomic analysis of the remains revealed Siberian ancestry and a closer genetic relationship to modern Amerindians of Central and South America than to those of Northern America. Anzick-1's discovery and subsequent analysis has been controversial. The remains were found on private land, so compliance with the Native American Graves Protection and Repatriation Act was not required in their study. However, some Native American tribal members in Montana felt they should have been consulted before researchers undertook analysis of the infant's skeleton and genome. Montana State law does require consultation with Native Americans concerning disposition of ancient skeletal remains.

After consultation, Anzick-1 was reburied on June 28, 2014, in the Shields River Valley in an intertribal ceremony. The numerous Clovis artifacts associated with the first burial are curated at the Montana Historical Society in Helena.

== Discovery ==
The Anzick site was accidentally discovered in 1968 by construction workers Ben Hargis and Calvin Sarver on land belonging to the Anzick family near Wilsall, Montana. The workers were using heavy equipment to collect material from the base of a sandstone escarpment, thought to be the remains of a collapsed rock shelter, when they uncovered the human remains and associated artifacts.

The initial finds were recovered by the workers before archaeologists could examine them in place. Subsequent excavations by the University of Montana recovered additional material, although these finds also came from deposits disturbed by the machinery. The circumstances of the discovery limited the reconstruction of the site's original arrangement.

The site contained remains of two children, designated Anzick-1 and Anzick-2. Skull fragments belonging to Anzick-2 were reported approximately 6 m (20 ft) east of Anzick-1.

== Condition ==
Anzick-1's remains were incomplete and highly fragmented, comprising at least 28 skull fragments, three ribs and the left clavicle. The skull fragments could be fitted together to reconstruct part of the cranial vault. This partial reconstruction allowed researchers to assess the child's age and examine basic indicators of health.

All of the surviving remains were stained with red ochre, which obscured the bones' natural colour. Discolouration of the left clavicle was initially interpreted as evidence of cremation, but subsequent examination attributed it to groundwater staining rather than exposure to fire.

== Grave goods ==
The objects associated with Anzick-1 included approximately 100 stone artifacts and 15 fragments of tools made from animal bone or antler. The stone assemblage included finished Clovis projectile points, unfinished points at several stages of manufacture, bifaces, flake tools and bifacial cores from which flakes could be struck to make cutting tools. The projectile points were identified with the Clovis culture by their characteristic shape and size.

The stone artifacts were made from materials including chert, chalcedony and jasper. The cores varied in size: one made from tan to greenish-brown chert measured 31.6 cm (12.4 in) long, while another, of white chalcedony, measured 21.5 cm (8.5 in). The texture and lustre of many artifacts indicated that the stone had been heated to make it easier to flake. Evidence of use on some tools suggests that they were not manufactured specifically for the burial. Some finished points also showed evidence of repair: four of the eight mostly complete points examined in a 1991 study had been reworked from larger examples, apparently after breakage.

The animal-derived tools included polished cylindrical rods with bevelled ends. Some were bevelled at both ends, while one reconstructed example had a bevelled end opposite a rounded, tapered tip. This rod showed wear and damage at its bevelled end, where crosshatched grooves retained traces of material interpreted as pitch. Genetic analysis identified at least one rod as having been made from elk antler. The antler artifacts have been described as among the oldest records of elk in North America south of the Laurentide Ice Sheet.

Similar rods have been recovered from other Clovis and Paleoindian sites, but their function remains uncertain. One interpretation is that they served as projectile foreshafts, components to which stone points were hafted and which were attached to a longer shaft. Archaeologists Philip J. Wilke, J. Jeffrey Flenniken and Terry L. Ozbun proposed an alternative after examining the artifacts and experimenting with replicas. They interpreted the rods as handles for pressure-flaking tools, with an antler working tip secured to the bevelled end using pitch and sinew.

== Scientific analysis ==
=== Age estimation ===
The age at death of an individual can be determined from several skeletal markers, including cranial suture closure, tooth eruption rates, rates of epiphyseal fusion on long bones, and others. Cranial bones fuse together along suture lines throughout the life of every human, and can be used to estimate the age at death of human remains. The small size and lack of suture closure of Anzick-1's crania revealed that the individual was 1–2 years old. The metopic suture is also present in the frontal bone of Anzick-1. This suture is present in most human infants but closes well before adulthood. The presence of a frontal suture in Anzick-1's remains corroborates the age estimation of 1–2 years old.

=== Isotopic analysis ===
δ^{13}C analysis of the remains of Anzick-1 (which probably reflect the diet of his mother) suggests that Columbian mammoths made up a large proportion (~35–40%) of the total diet of his group, with major contributions also coming from elk and probably bison, with small animals only making up a small proportion (~4%) of the diet.

=== Paleogenetic findings ===
A team of researchers throughout the United States and Europe conducted paleogenetic research on the Anzick-1 skeletal remains. They sequenced the mitochondrial DNA (mtDNA), the full nuclear DNA, and the Y-chromosome, and compared these sequences to those of modern populations throughout the world. The results of these analyses allowed the researchers to make conclusions about ancient migration patterns and the peopling of the Americas.

These analyses revealed that the individual was closely related to Native Americans in Central and South America, instead of being closely related to the people of the Canadian Arctic, as had previously been thought likely. (The people of the Arctic are distinct from Native Americans to the south, including in lower North America and Central and South America.) The infant was also related to persons from Siberia and Central Asia, believed to be the ancestral population of indigenous peoples in the Americas. This finding supports the theory that the peopling of the Americas occurred from Asia across the Bering Strait.

=== Nuclear DNA analysis ===
The genome of Anzick-1 was sequenced and analyzed to look for specific mutations that might shed light on the population history of modern Native Americans. Anzick-1's genome was compared to over 50 Native American genomes for comparison, and researchers found that it was significantly more similar to these than to any modern Eurasian population. Anzick-1's genome was closer to 44 Native American populations from Central and South America than to 7 Native American populations from North America; samples from North America were limited as tribes in the United States have been reluctant to participate.

=== Mitochondrial DNA analysis ===
Morten Rasmussen and Sarah L. Anzick et al. sequenced the mitochondrial DNA of Anzick-1 and determined that the infant represents an ancient migration to North America from Siberia. They found that Anzick-1's mtDNA belongs to the haplogroup D4h3a, a "founder" haplogroup that might represent people taking an early coastal migration route into the Americas. The D haplogroup is also found in modern Native American populations, which provides a link between Anzick-1 and modern Native Americans. Although it is rare in most of today's Native Americans in the US and Canada, D4h3a genes are more common in native people of South America. This suggests a greater genetic complexity among Native Americans than previously thought, including an early divergence in the genetic lineage some 13,000 years ago. One theory suggested that after crossing into North America from Siberia, a group of the first Americans, with the lineage D4h3a, moved south along the Pacific coast and finally, through thousands of years, into Central and South America. Another line may have moved inland, east of the Rocky Mountains, ultimately populating most of what is now the United States and Canada.

=== Y-chromosome analysis ===
The Y-chromosome of Anzick-1 was sequenced, and researchers determined that his Y-chromosome haplogroup is Q-L54*(xM3), one of the major founding lineages of the Americas.

== Implications ==
Anzick-1's mtDNA, nuclear DNA, and Y-Chromosome analysis revealed a close genetic affinity to modern Native Americans and provided evidence of gene flow from Siberia into the Americas nearly 13,000 years ago, earlier than thought. These findings tend to support the Beringia Hypothesis of the peopling of the Americas, and tend to refute the Solutrean Hypothesis which argues for Paleo-European migration to the New World and which had little academic support even prior to the sequencing of Anzick-1's genome.

The Beringia Hypothesis is the mainstream model for the peopling of the Americas, which posits a migration of early Amerindians from Siberia across a land bridge that spanned the Bering Strait. This hypothesis is supported by genetic and archaeological evidence that places the migration no earlier than 32,000 years ago. Ancient Native Americans could have entered the New World across the Beringian land bridge, and passing south from Alaska through an ice-free corridor in Canada. Another concept is that they used boats to sail along the coast of Siberia, the Beringia land bridge, and the Pacific coast of North America. Archeological evidence at the former area of the land bridge or a coastal path has been lost because of the rise in sea levels. The Anzick-1 paleogenetic analysis lends support to the Beringia Hypothesis theory, showing that humans had arrived in Montana by nearly 13,000 years ago.

== Cause of death ==
Due to the incomplete nature of the remains of Anzick-1, no cause of death could be ascertained.

== Ethics ==
Studying the remains of ancient Native Americans has been described as an "ethical minefield" because it calls into question "ownership" and interpretation of the past. Historically Native American remains were routinely excavated and analyzed without the consultation with, or permission of, contemporary Native Americans. Under the Native American Graves Protection and Repatriation Act passed in 1990 US law protects the remains and artifacts of Native Americans found on federal lands or stored by institutions that receive federal funding. It requires restoration of remains and artifacts to tribes associated with the remains or culture.

After the remains of Anzick-1 were excavated in 1968, they were analyzed by several teams of researchers and eventually returned to the Anzick family. The daughter of the Anzick family, Sarah Anzick had become a genetic researcher. She hoped to conduct genomic analysis on the Anzick-1 skeleton. She was cautious because a previous case, involving the ancient remains of a Native American called Kennewick Man, caused a great deal of controversy.

Since Anzick-1 was discovered on private property, Sarah Anzick was not legally required to consult tribal members before conducting analysis of the remains. She discussed her goals with representatives of several Montana tribes that now inhabit the area, to determine whether to use the required techniques (which destroy some material) to analyze the remains of Anzick-1. Because she was unable to achieve consensus, she temporarily gave up the project. She eventually conducted DNA analysis on the remains of Anzick-1.

After the results of the analysis revealed a link between Anzick-1 and modern Native Americans, the team of researchers sought consultation from several Montana tribes. Eske Willerslev, a Danish genetic researcher, visited several Indian reservations in Montana in 2013 to try to engage community members in the decision-making related to the research of Anzick-1. He met with Shane Doyle, who became a co-author of the paper. A member of the Crow tribe, Doyle works in Native American studies at Montana State University. There were mixed opinions about the research conducted on Anzick-1, but many tribal members said that they would prefer to have been contacted before the destructive techniques were performed, not after. The overwhelming response from Montana tribal members was that the remains of Anzick-1 should be reburied according to tribal ritual.

== See also ==
- Peopling of the Americas
- Paleo-Indians
