= James Chatters =

American archaeologist and paleontologist

James C. Chatters (born March 20, 1949) is an American archaeologist and paleontologist. As of 2012, he is the owner of forensics consulting firm, Applied Paleoscience; and serves as a research associate in the Office of Graduate Studies, Research, and Continuing Education at Central Washington University; Deputy Coroner of Benton County, Washington; and a consulting scientist on staff with Foster Wheeler Environmental Corporation of Bothell, Washington. In 1996, Chatters was the first scientist to excavate and study the prehistoric (Paleo-Indian) skeletal remains, known as Kennewick Man, which were discovered on the banks of the Columbia River.

== Educational background ==
James Chatters attended Washington State University in Pullman, Washington, graduating in 1971 with a bachelor's degree in anthropology. He then enrolled in the University of Washington in Seattle, where he continued his study of anthropology, earning his master's degree and Ph.D. in 1975 and 1982, respectively.

== Professional background ==
Since 1964, Chatters has participated in archeological studies and excavations, and provided osteological analyses throughout the western US and the Pacific Northwest, as well as Hawaii, Alaska, Minnesota, Texas, the province of Saskatchewan in Canada, and the country of Brazil. After earning his Master's degree in 1975, he began participating in paleoecological projects in the western US, along with Kentucky and Maryland.

In the fall of 1977, he served as an archeologist in the Custer National Forest in Watford City, North Dakota. The following year, he returned to the University of Washington, to pursue his Ph.D. in anthropology, while simultaneously serving as the acting director of the Office of Public Archeology for the school. From 1980–81, he served as an assistant professor with the department of anthropology at Central Washington University, and in 1982, he began serving as the associate director of the Central Washington Archaeological Survey.

In 1987, Chatters relocated to the Tri-Cities, where he joined the staff of Pacific Northwest National Laboratory, also known as Battelle-Northwest, serving as senior research scientist in the environmental sciences department. He held this role until 1993, when he chose to establish the forensics consulting firm Applied Paleoscience. It is in this role that he has provided forensic analysis and scientific research for government agencies, law enforcement officials, and tribal nations throughout the Northwest.

=== Ancient One discovery ===
On July 28, 1996, two local students, Will Thomas and Dave Deacy, discovered a skull embedded in the mud and underbrush of the south bank of the Columbia River, while they were wandering alongside the river during the Tri-City Water Follies hydroplane boat races. After they alerted a local police officer, a local dive team went out to the area, gathered more bone fragments along with the skull, then taped off the shore for protection, as a possible crime scene.

At the time of the discovery, Chatters owned a forensics consulting business called Applied Paleoscience, in which he often worked with local government officials and law enforcement to assist with criminal investigations. He also consulted with Northwest tribes to assist with protection and repatriation of Native American remains discovered throughout the Columbia Basin.

On the early evening of the discovery, the Benton County Coroner, Floyd Johnson, called Chatters to ask him to take a look at the skull to determine if it belonged to a current or recent crime victim. Chatters, eager to help, invited Johnson to bring the skull over to his home, after which they quickly returned to the discovery site to gather more skeletal remains, before the sun would set that evening. His initial assessment determined that the skull displayed characteristics consistent with ancient Paleo-Indian remains. Subsequent tests determined that the remains dated back to a calibrated age of 9,800 years.

Chatters' scientific findings brought controversy to the discovery and triggered a nine-year legal battle between scientists, the US Army Corps of Engineers, and Native American tribes, who attempted to claim the remains as one of their ancestors, in accordance with the Native American Graves Protection and Repatriation Act (NAGPRA). Various Northwest tribes, including the Umatilla, Yakama, Colville, Nez Perce, and Wanapum nations all asserted rights to claim the remains for immediate reburial, without further scientific study or examination. The US Army Corps of Engineers, who oversaw the land where the remains were found, agreed to comply with the requests of the tribes. Before the transfer could be made, eight scientists filed a lawsuit asserting their legal right to study the remains. They believed that the bones were a rare national treasure, that held the potential to reveal vital information about the peopling of the North American continent.

In 2002, a federal court in the state of Oregon ruled that the tribes failed to establish viable and definitive cultural links between themselves and Ancient One, formerly known as, Kennewick Man. This ruling opened up the way for Chatters and the team of eight scientists to study the remains. Following an appeal in February 2004, a panel of the United States Court of Appeals for the Ninth Circuit upheld the decision. The ruling additionally set a precedent, ensuring that any future discovery of ancient remains would also be made available for scientific studies.

However, in 2015, Ancient One, formerly known as, Kennewick Man was shown to be more closely related to local indigenous populations than to any other group, worldwide, thanks to DNA analysis. Using craniometry, a team had concluded that Ancient One, formerly known as Kennewick Man, was related to Western- or South-Pacific populations such as the Ainu or the Polynesians.

== Published works ==
- Chatters, James C. Ancient Encounters: Kennewick Man and the First Americans, Simon & Schuster, 2001. ISBN 978-0684859361
- Chatters, James C. (ed.); Prentiss, Anna (ed.); and Kuijt, Ian (ed.). Macroevolution in Human Prehistory: Evolutionary Theory and Processual Archaeology, Springer Publishing, 2009. ISBN 978-1441906816
