= Wilsall, Montana =

- CDP
- Location of Wilsall, Montana
- Coordinates: 45°59′35″N 110°39′36″W
- Country: United States
- State: Montana
- County: Park

Area
  - Total: 1.12 sq mi (2.90 km^{2})
  - Land: 1.12 sq mi (2.90 km^{2})
  - Water: 0 sq mi (0.00 km^{2})
- Elevation: 5,059 ft (1,542 m)

Population (2020)
  - Total: 197
  - Density: 176.1/sq mi (67.99/km^{2})
- Time zone: UTC-7 (Mountain (MST))
  - Summer (DST): UTC-6 (MDT)
- ZIP code: 59086
- Area code: 406
- FIPS code: 30-80875
- GNIS feature ID: 2409602

Wilsall is a census-designated place (CDP) in Park County, Montana, United States. As of the 2020 census, Wilsall had a population of 197.

== Description ==
Wilsall takes its name from Will Jordan, of the Jordan-Robertson Company cattle ranch, and his wife, Sally. The Northern Pacific Railway line arrived in December 1909, and the post office opened a year later.

== Geography ==
Wilsall is located in central Montana, 29 miles (46 km) northeast of Bozeman, 78 miles (125 km) east-southeast of Helena and 105 miles (169 km) west of Billings.

According to the United States Census Bureau, the CDP has a total area of 1.0 square mile (2.6 km^{2}), all land.

=== Climate ===
This climatic region is typified by large seasonal temperature differences, with warm to hot (and often humid) summers and cold (sometimes severely cold) winters. According to the Köppen Climate Classification system, Wilsall has a humid continental climate, abbreviated "Dfb" on climate maps.

Climate data for Wilsall, Montana, 1991–2020 normals, extremes 1957–2017
| Month | Jan | Feb | Mar | Apr | May | Jun | Jul | Aug | Sep | Oct | Nov | Dec | Year |
|---|---|---|---|---|---|---|---|---|---|---|---|---|---|
| Record high °F (°C) | 61 (16) | 62 (17) | 70 (21) | 79 (26) | 83 (28) | 92 (33) | 99 (37) | 96 (36) | 92 (33) | 83 (28) | 70 (21) | 59 (15) | 99 (37) |
| Mean maximum °F (°C) | 51.0 (10.6) | 52.8 (11.6) | 58.9 (14.9) | 69.6 (20.9) | 77.1 (25.1) | 84.1 (28.9) | 90.0 (32.2) | 89.3 (31.8) | 83.9 (28.8) | 74.6 (23.7) | 60.4 (15.8) | 49.2 (9.6) | 91.4 (33.0) |
| Mean daily maximum °F (°C) | 33.5 (0.8) | 34.3 (1.3) | 42.1 (5.6) | 49.2 (9.6) | 59.2 (15.1) | 68.0 (20.0) | 78.6 (25.9) | 78.8 (26.0) | 68.3 (20.2) | 53.6 (12.0) | 40.7 (4.8) | 32.5 (0.3) | 53.2 (11.8) |
| Daily mean °F (°C) | 23.9 (−4.5) | 23.9 (−4.5) | 31.2 (−0.4) | 37.5 (3.1) | 46.5 (8.1) | 54.4 (12.4) | 62.1 (16.7) | 61.6 (16.4) | 53.0 (11.7) | 41.5 (5.3) | 30.5 (−0.8) | 22.9 (−5.1) | 40.8 (4.9) |
| Mean daily minimum °F (°C) | 14.2 (−9.9) | 13.5 (−10.3) | 20.2 (−6.6) | 25.7 (−3.5) | 33.8 (1.0) | 40.8 (4.9) | 45.7 (7.6) | 44.3 (6.8) | 37.6 (3.1) | 29.4 (−1.4) | 20.2 (−6.6) | 13.4 (−10.3) | 28.2 (−2.1) |
| Mean minimum °F (°C) | −12.0 (−24.4) | −12.1 (−24.5) | −0.9 (−18.3) | 11.1 (−11.6) | 21.7 (−5.7) | 30.7 (−0.7) | 36.7 (2.6) | 35.2 (1.8) | 24.3 (−4.3) | 10.9 (−11.7) | −1.7 (−18.7) | −11.3 (−24.1) | −24.0 (−31.1) |
| Record low °F (°C) | −35 (−37) | −42 (−41) | −24 (−31) | −13 (−25) | 13 (−11) | 21 (−6) | 30 (−1) | 26 (−3) | 10 (−12) | −11 (−24) | −31 (−35) | −41 (−41) | −42 (−41) |
| Average precipitation inches (mm) | 0.81 (21) | 0.71 (18) | 1.12 (28) | 2.15 (55) | 3.01 (76) | 3.46 (88) | 1.61 (41) | 1.56 (40) | 1.56 (40) | 1.51 (38) | 0.99 (25) | 0.82 (21) | 19.31 (491) |
| Average snowfall inches (cm) | 14.1 (36) | 10.6 (27) | 14.7 (37) | 13.5 (34) | 1.6 (4.1) | 0.0 (0.0) | 0.0 (0.0) | 0.1 (0.25) | 0.6 (1.5) | 3.4 (8.6) | 9.1 (23) | 14.0 (36) | 81.7 (207.45) |
| Average precipitation days (≥ 0.01 in) | 5.3 | 4.9 | 6.7 | 9.1 | 10.7 | 10.8 | 7.3 | 6.4 | 6.3 | 6.2 | 5.8 | 5.5 | 85.0 |
| Average snowy days (≥ 0.1 in) | 5.2 | 4.3 | 4.8 | 3.8 | 0.7 | 0.0 | 0.0 | 0.0 | 0.2 | 1.5 | 2.8 | 4.6 | 27.9 |
Source 1: NOAA
Source 2: National Weather Service (mean maxima and minima 1981–2010)

== Demographics ==
Historical population
| Census | Pop. | Note | %± |
|---|---|---|---|
| 2020 | 197 | | — |
U.S. Decennial Census

As of the census of 2000, there were 237 people, 102 households, and 68 families residing in the CDP. The population density was 234.5 inhabitants per square mile (90.5/km^{2}). There were 119 housing units at an average density of 117.7 per square mile (45.4/km^{2}). The racial makeup of the CDP was 95.36% White, 1.69% Native American, 2.95% from other races. Hispanic or Latino of any race were 2.95% of the population.

There were 102 households, out of which 25.5% had children under the age of 18 living with them, 55.9% were married couples living together, 7.8% had a female householder with no husband present, and 33.3% were non-families. 28.4% of all households were made up of individuals, and 9.8% had someone living alone who was 65 years of age or older. The average household size was 2.32 and the average family size was 2.85.

In the CDP, the population was spread out, with 23.6% under the age of 18, 4.6% from 18 to 24, 23.2% from 25 to 44, 28.7% from 45 to 64, and 19.8% who were 65 years of age or older. The median age was 44 years. For every 100 females, there were 94.3 males. For every 100 females age 18 and over, there were 94.6 males.

The median income for a household in the CDP was $29,643, and the median income for a family was $30,357. Males had a median income of $28,000 versus $21,607 for females. The per capita income for the CDP was $14,585. About 16.7% of families and 17.9% of the population were below the poverty line, including 30.9% of those under the age of eighteen and 2.6% of those 65 or over.

== Education ==
Shields Valley Public Schools has two components: Shields Valley Elementary School District and Shields Valley High School District. The CDP is in both districts.

Shields Valley Public Schools educates students from kindergarten through 12th grade. The elementary school is in Wilsall. The Jr/Sr High School is located in Clyde Park. The Shields Valley High School team name is the Rebels.

== Notable people ==
Notable residents include Dirk Adams, owner of the Lazy SR Ranch and the Wilsall General Store.

== See also ==
- List of census-designated places in Montana
