= Muséum de Toulouse =

Natural history museum in Toulouse, France

Coordinates: 43.5931°N 1.4492°E

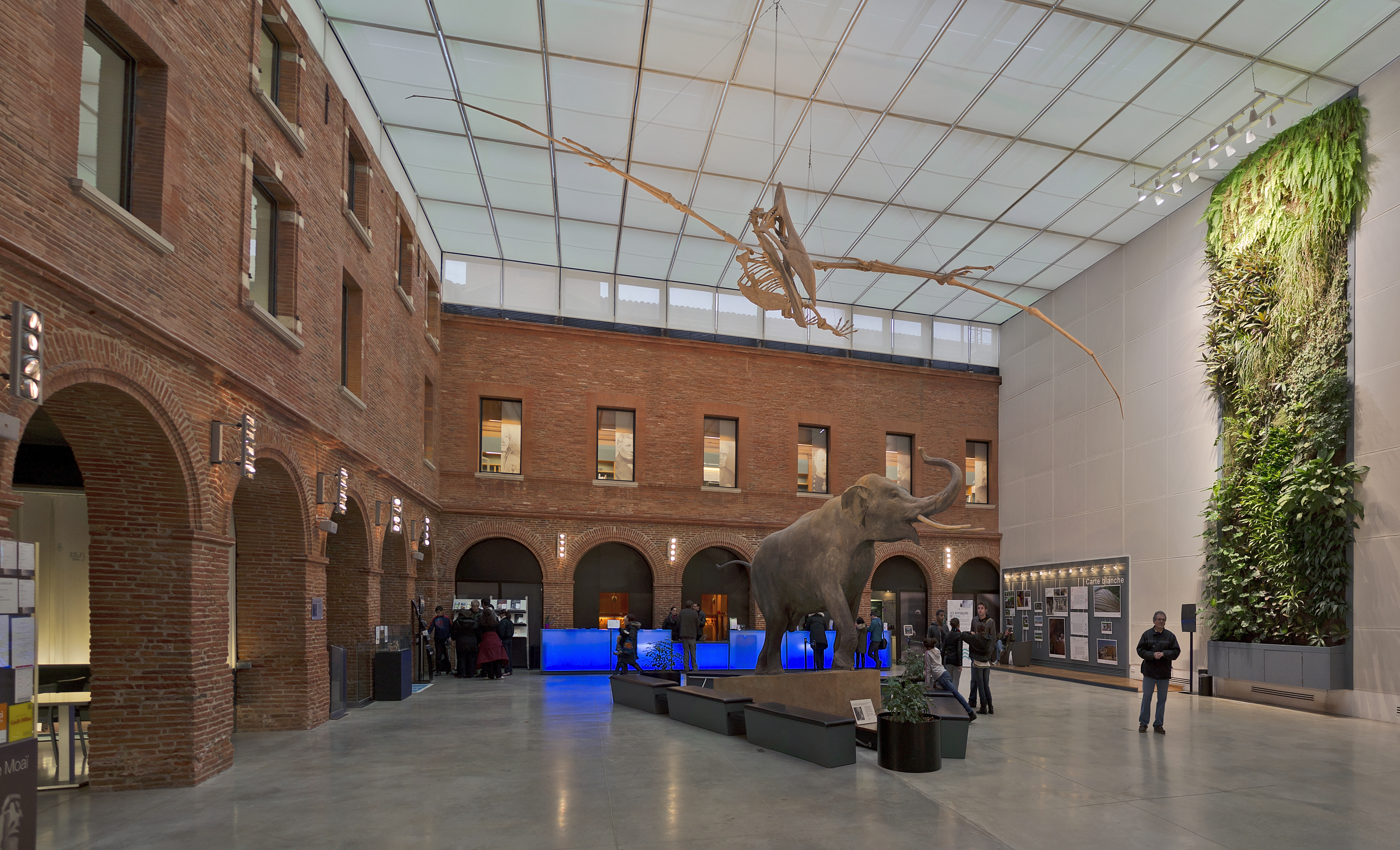
Entry hall of the Muséum de Toulouse

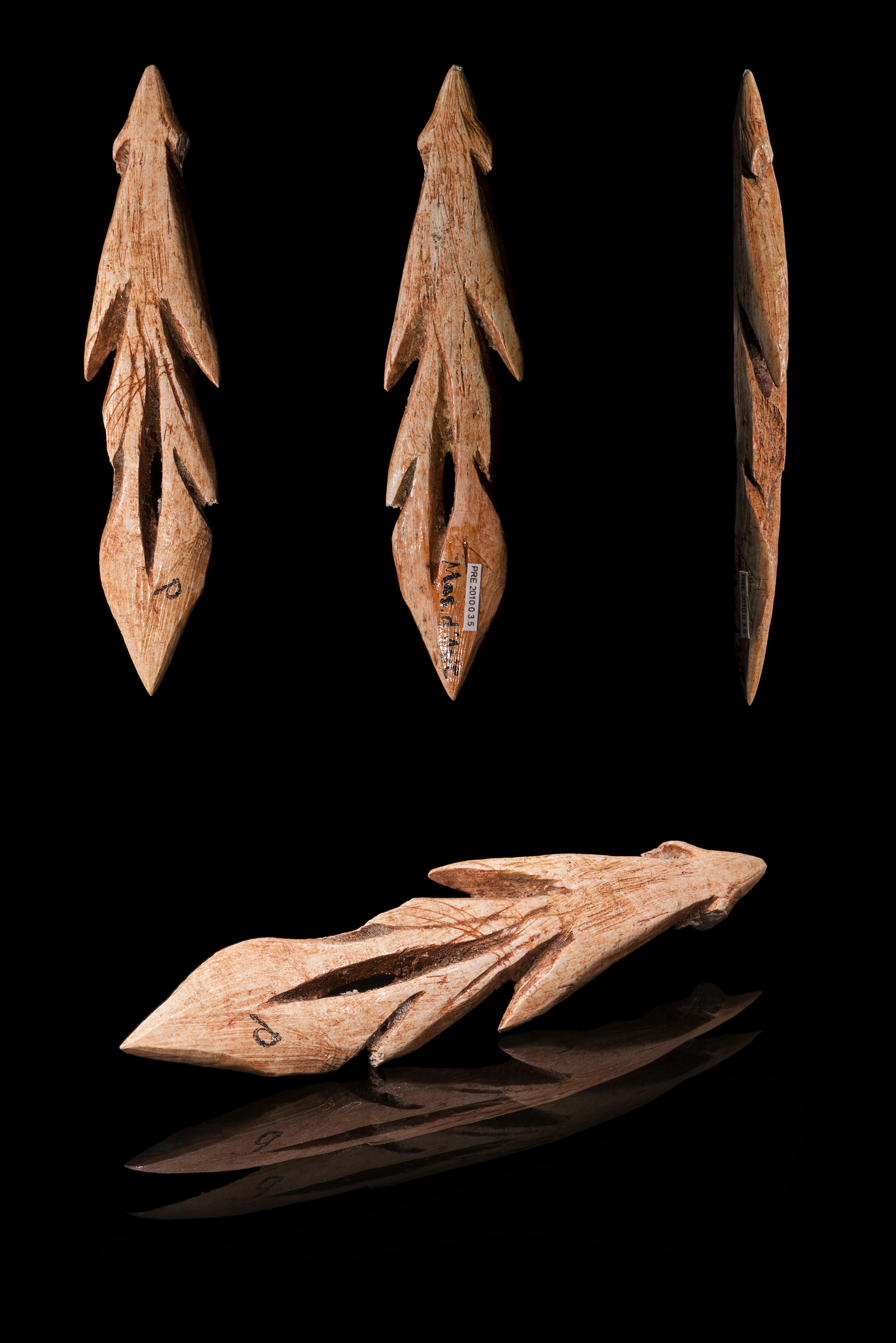
Multiple view of bone Azilian harpoon head, from about 10,000 years ago

The Muséum de Toulouse (Muséum d'Histoire Naturelle de la ville de Toulouse, MHNT; Occitan: Musèu d'Istòria Naturala de la vila de Tolosa, MINT) is a museum of natural history in Toulouse, France. It is located in the Busca-Montplaisir neighborhood of the city, houses a collection of more than 2.5 million items, and has some 3,000 square metres (32,000 sq ft) of exhibition space. Its Index Herbariorum code is TLM.

== History ==
The museum was founded in 1796 by the naturalist Philippe-Isidore Picot de Lapeyrouse, with his collections being able to be housed (after the revolution) in the former Carmelite monastery in Toulouse. In 1808, the emperor Napoleon formally donated all the Carmelite buildings and land to the city of Toulouse, and in 1865, the museum was opened to the public in its present location and under the directorship of Édouard Filhol. Toulouse museum was the first museum in the world to open a gallery of prehistory thanks to the collection of the malacologist Alfred de Candie de Saint-Simon (1731–1851), and the collaboration of Émile Cartailhac, Jean-Baptiste Noulet, and Eugène Trutat.

In 1887 (on the occasion of a world exposition in Toulouse), the botanical gardens of the University of Toulouse became part of the museum. In 2008, the museum reopened in its present form (as of May 2018) with the renovations and extensions of the museum, designed by the architectural firm of Jean-Paul Viguier, having been completed.

== Permanent exhibitions ==
The permanent exhibition has five linked themes:

- Sequence 1: Feeling the Earth's power.

Nature of the Solar System and its formation. Nature of the Earth – plate tectonics, seismic and volcanic activity and erosion, petrology and mineralogy.

- Sequence 2: Doing away with our notions of hierarchy.

The nature of life – biodiversity, classification, and organization.

- Sequence 3: Getting to grips with the huge scale.

Earth history from 3.8 billion years ago. Introduces time, palaeontology and the evolution of life

- Sequence 4: Admitting the obvious.

The main functions of living beings – feeding, respiration, locomotion, reproduction, protection and communication.

- Sequence 5: Inventing the future.

The impact of human activity – demographic pressure on ecosystems and natural resources

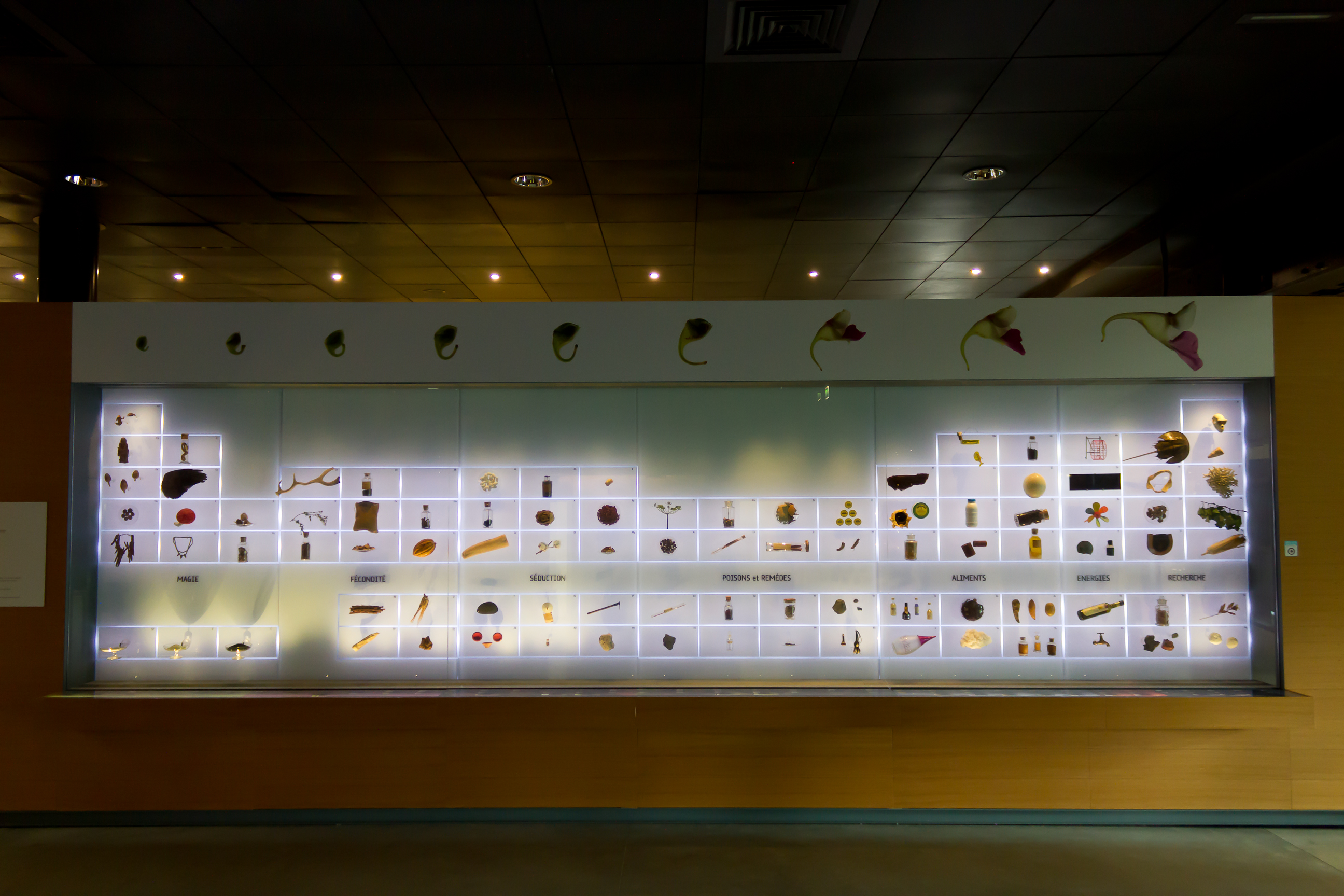

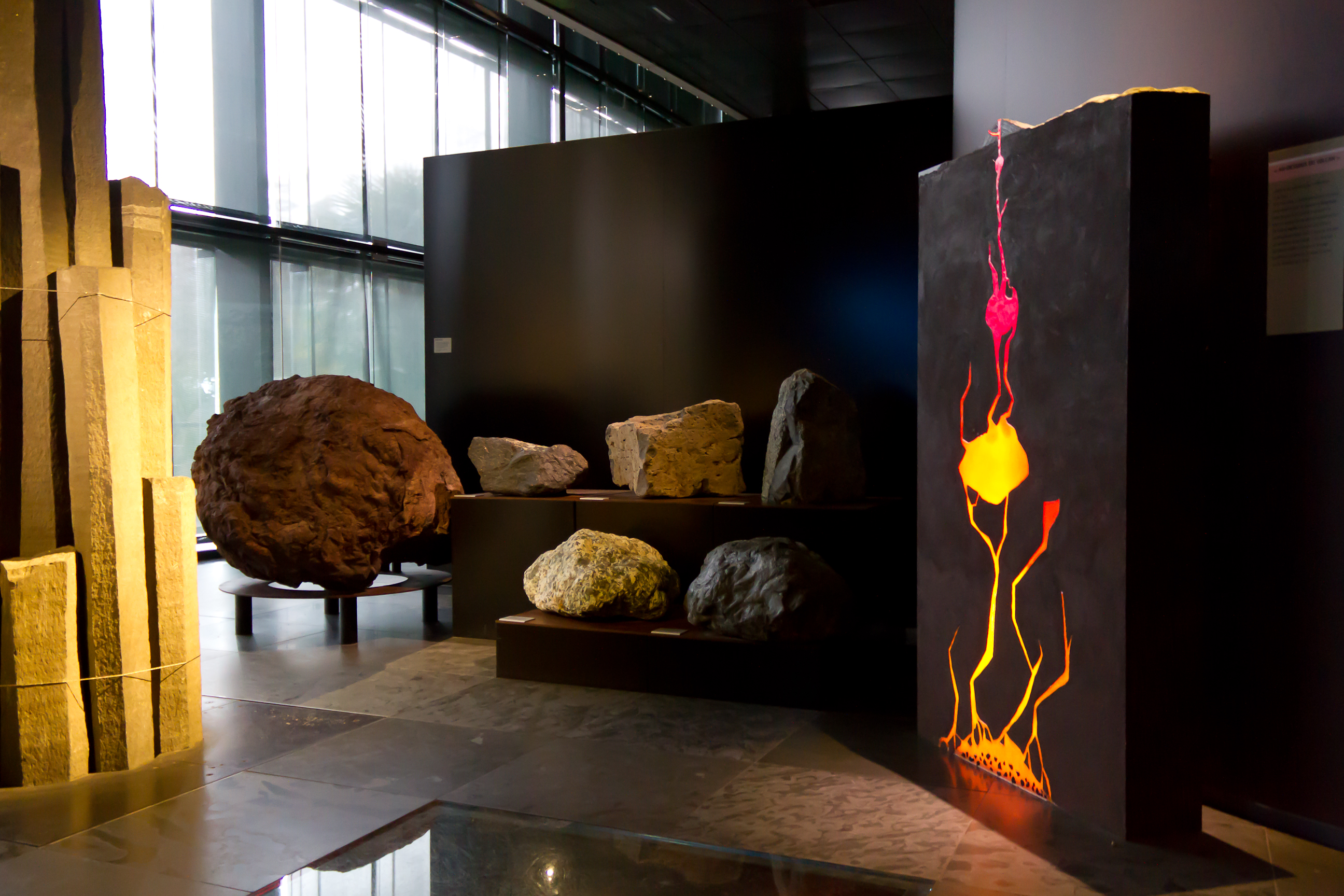

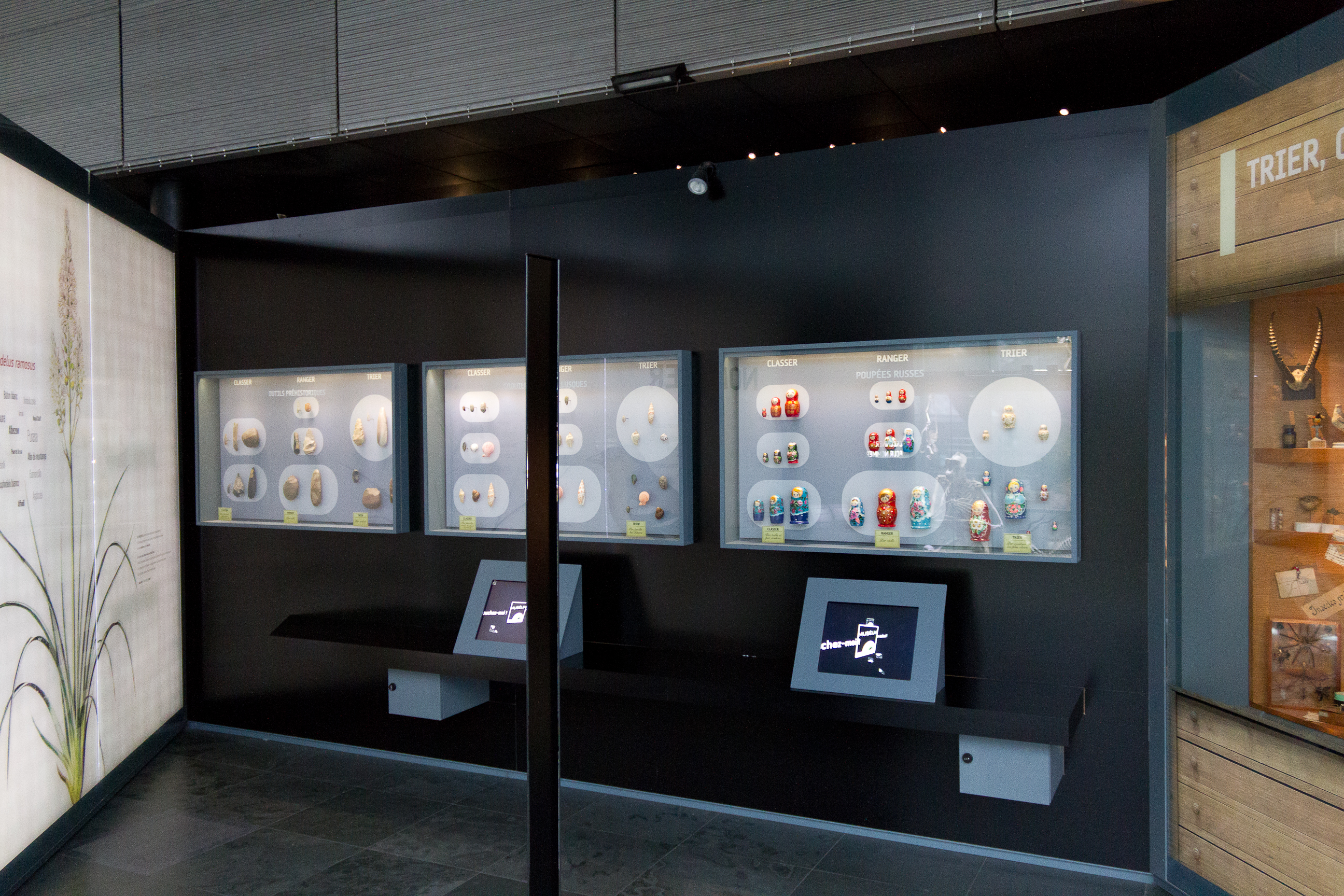

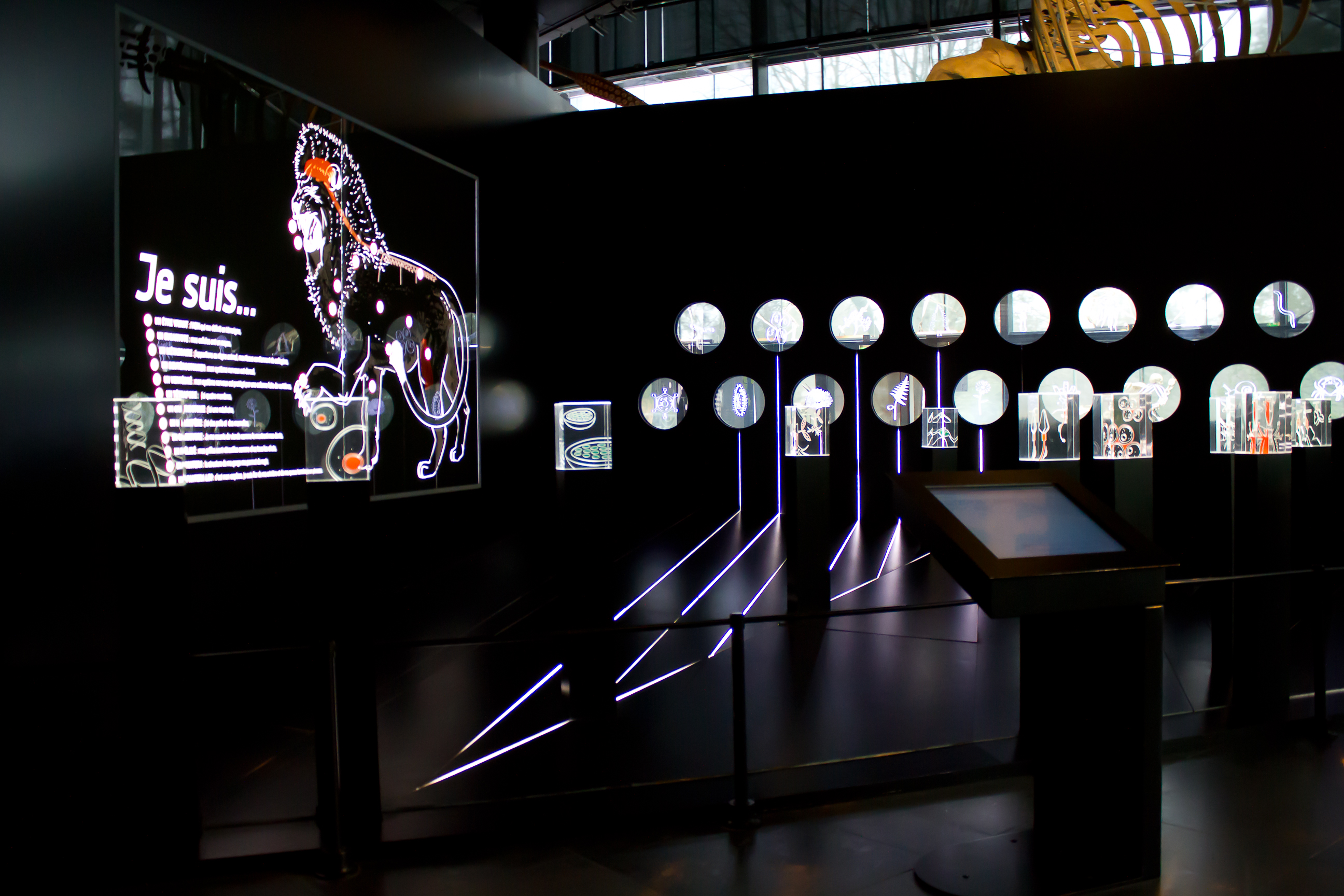

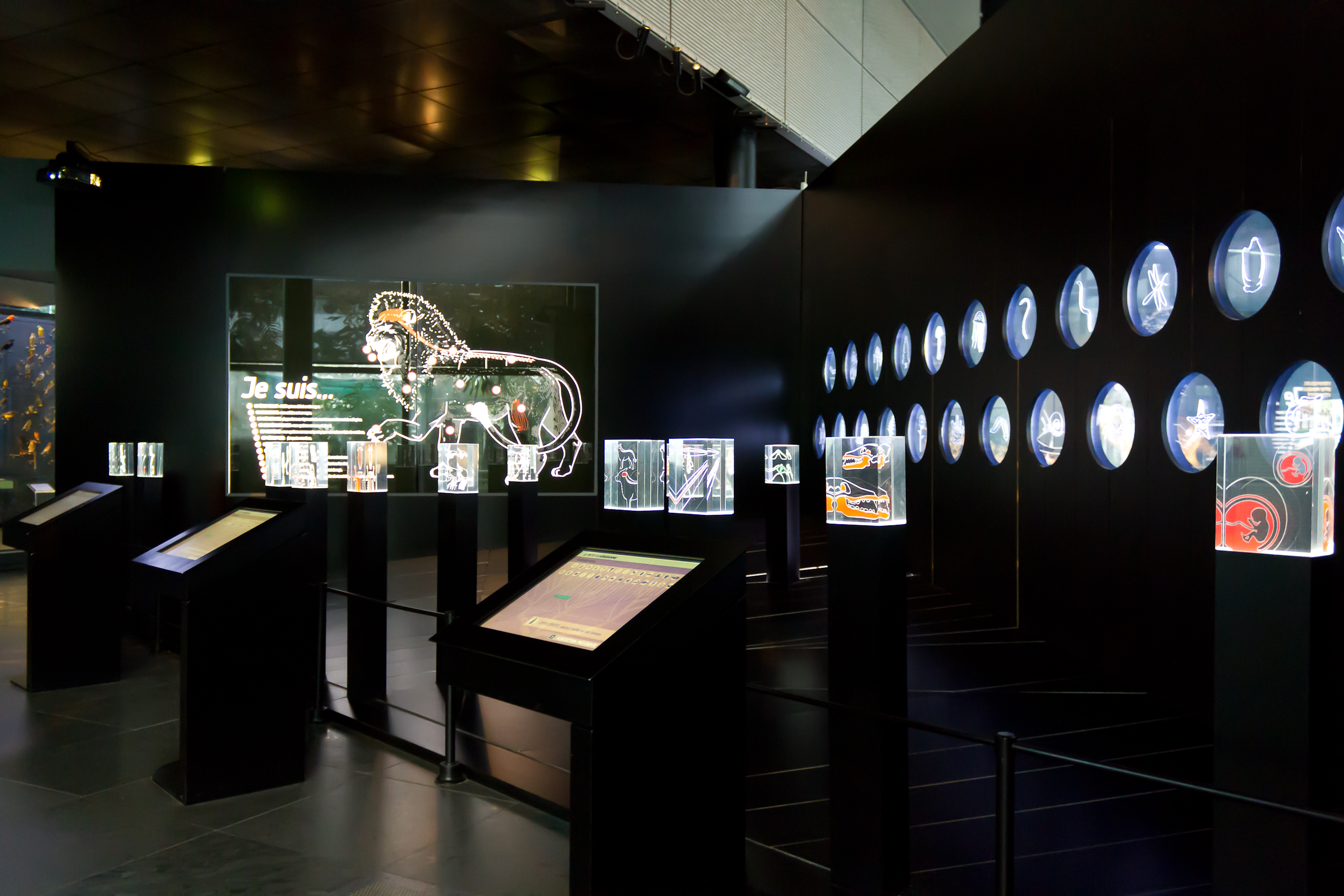

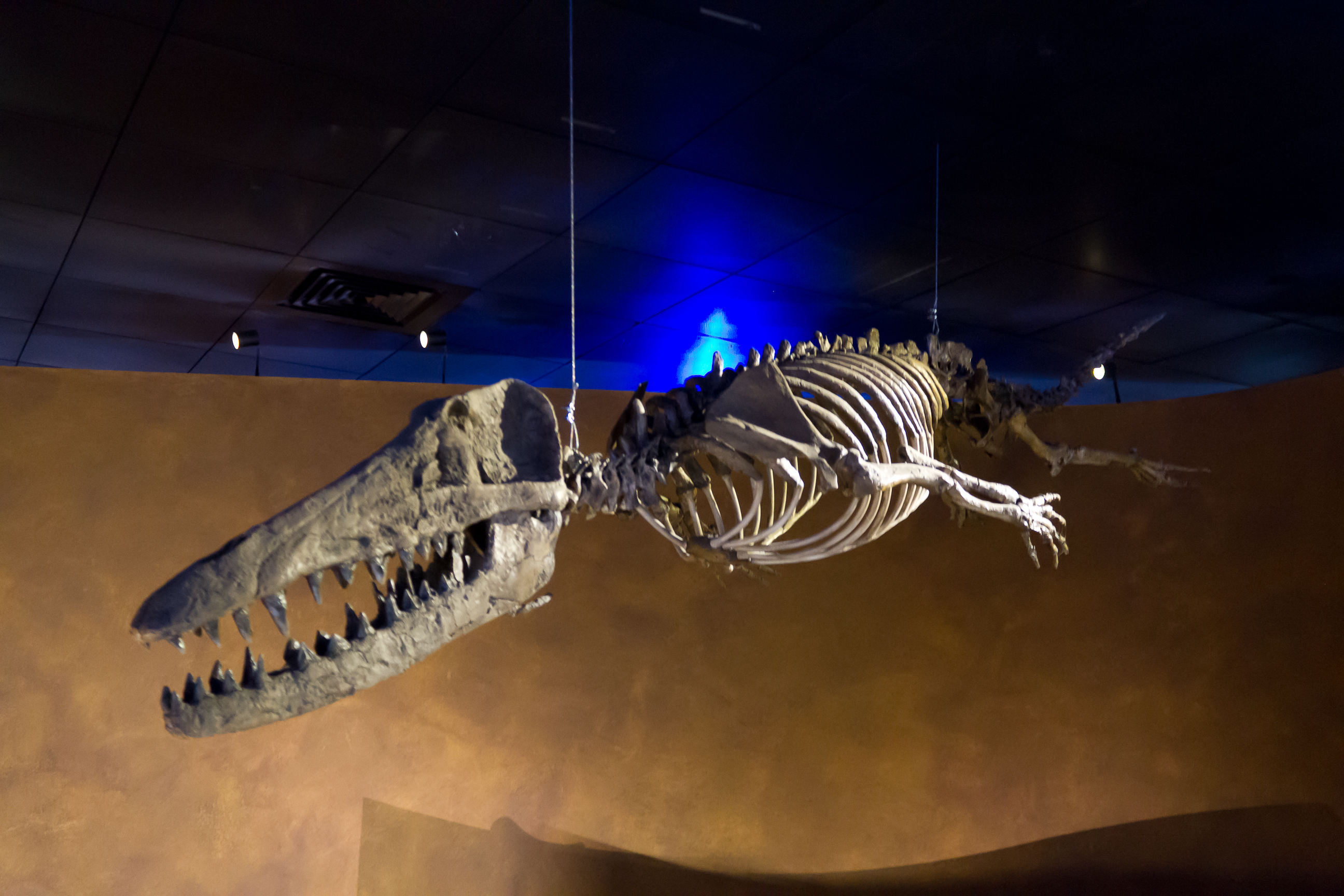

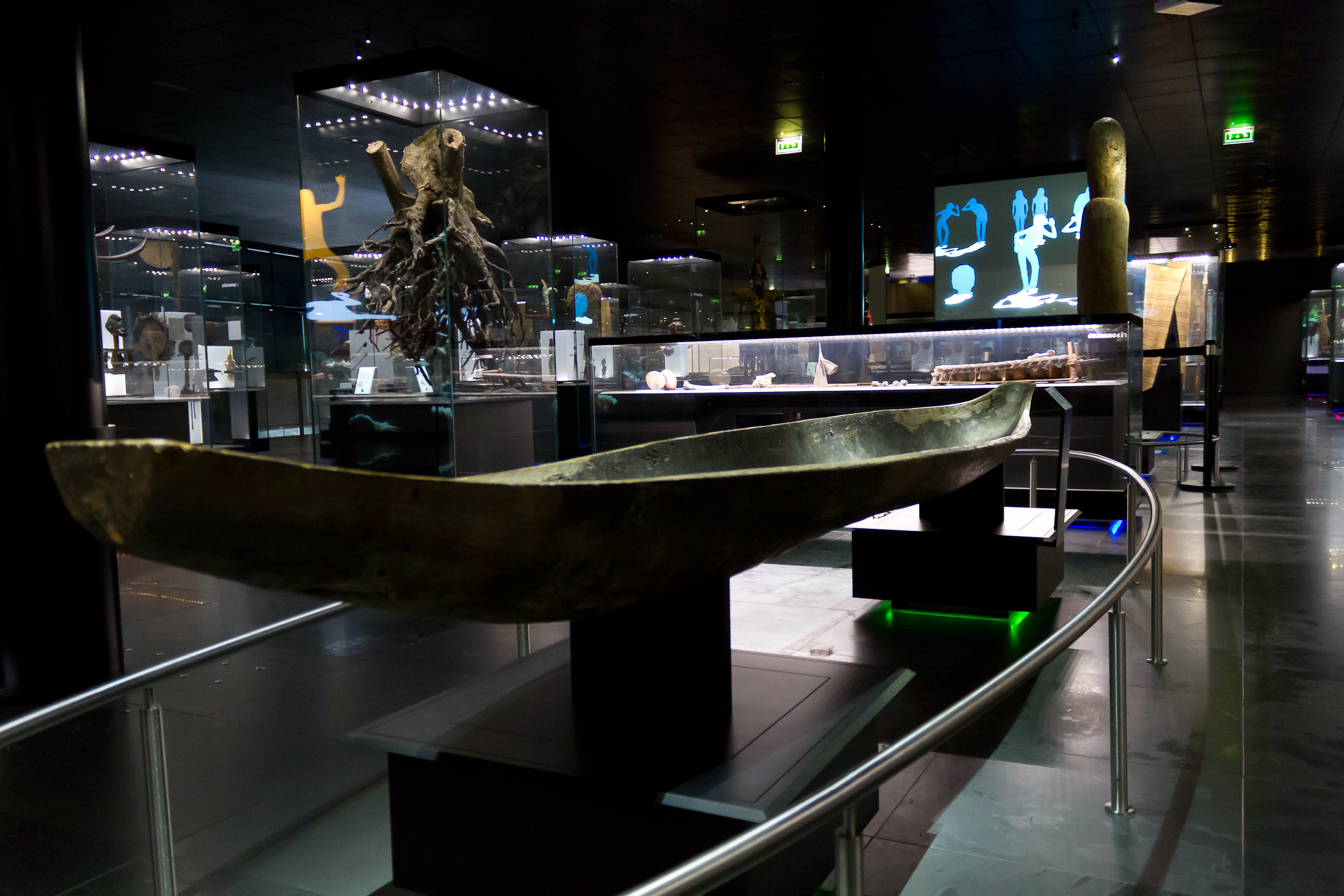

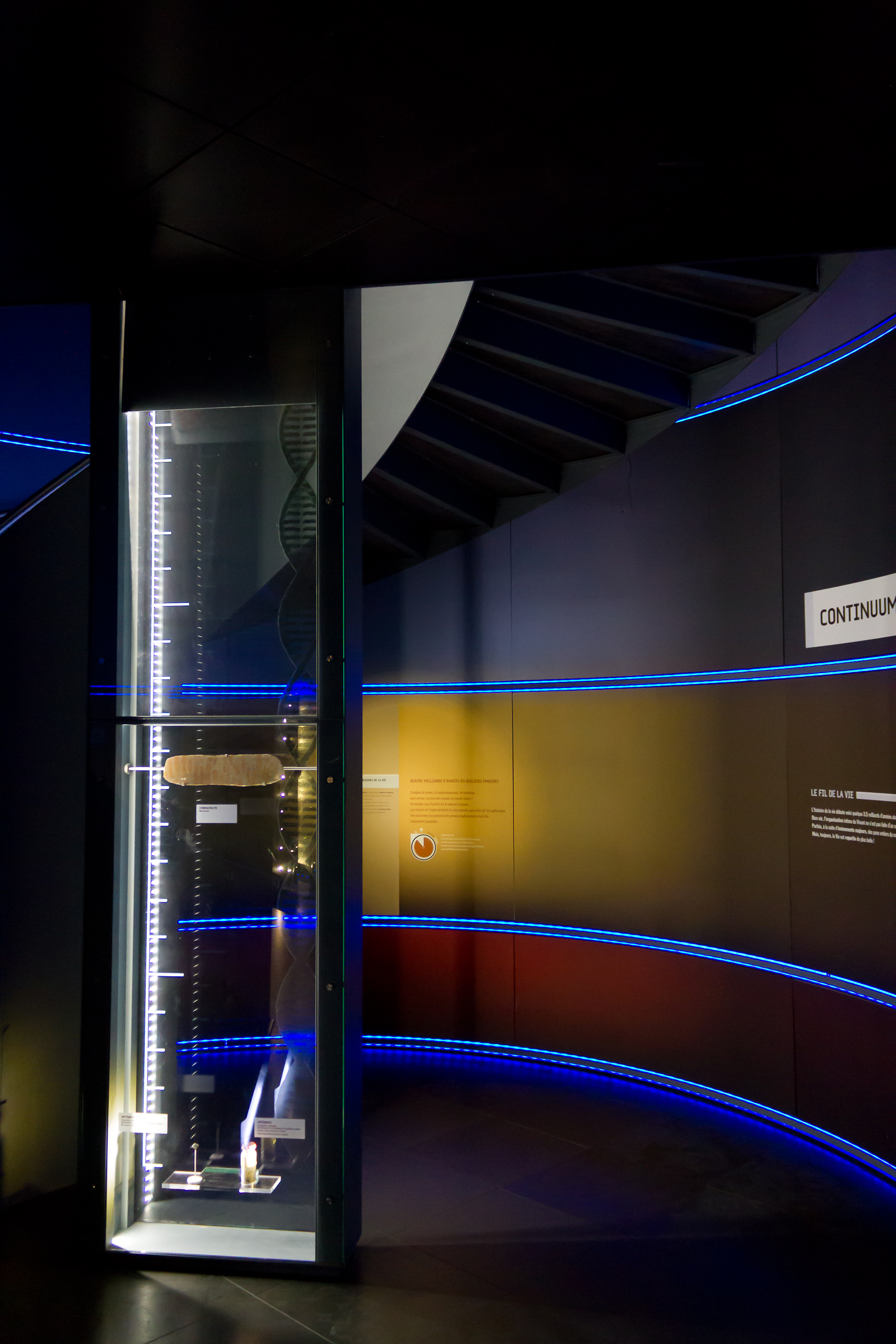

== Collections ==
This section presents examples to illustrate the content of each different collection of the Museum de Toulouse.

=== Prehistory ===
The prehistoric collection includes mostly artefacts excavated in France. They also contain comparative material from other parts of Europe and other continents. Notable collectors include Édouard Harlé (1850–1922), Antoine Meillet (1866–1936), Alexis Damour (1808–1902), Félix Regnault (1847–1908), Louis Péringuey (1855–1924), Émile Cartailhac (1845–1921), Daniel Bugnicourt, Edward John Dunn (1844–1937), Henri Breuil (1877–1961), and Louis Lartet (1840–1899), as well as the curators Jean-Baptiste Noulet (1802–1890), Eugène Trutat (1840–1910), and Édouard Filhol (1814–1883).

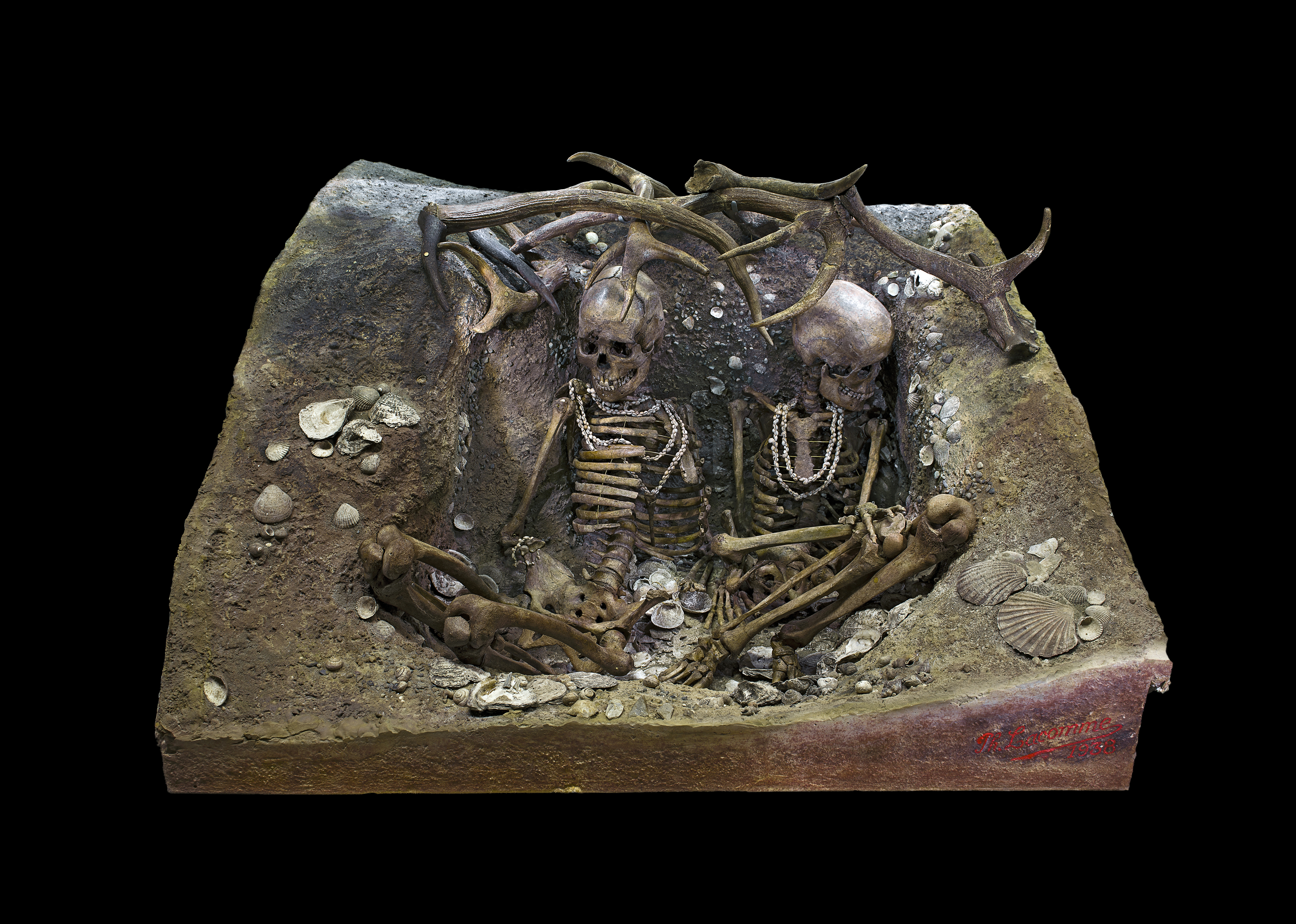
Mesolithic tomb from Téviec, Brittany

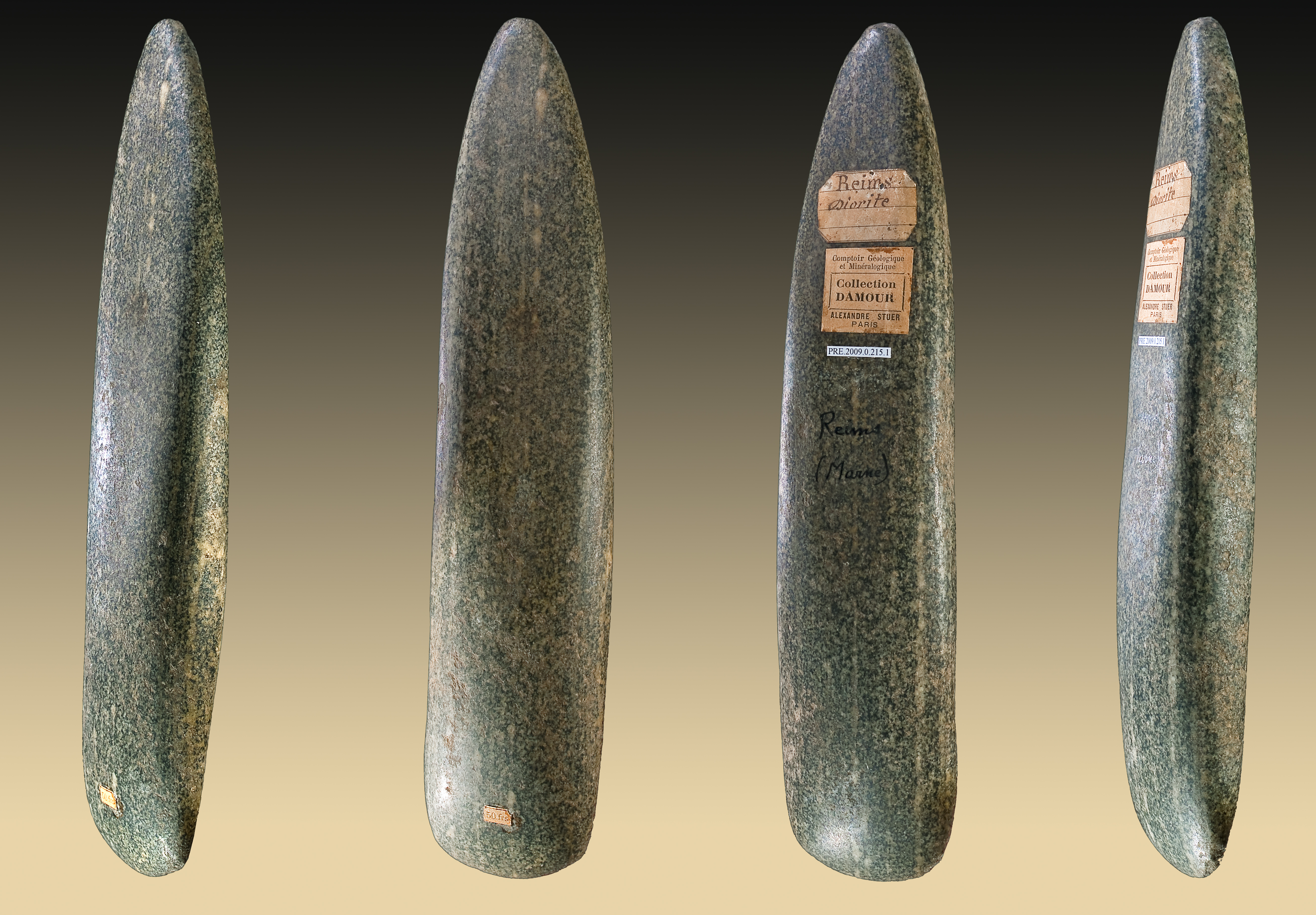
Polished Neolithic axe from Reims France – Alexis Damour collection

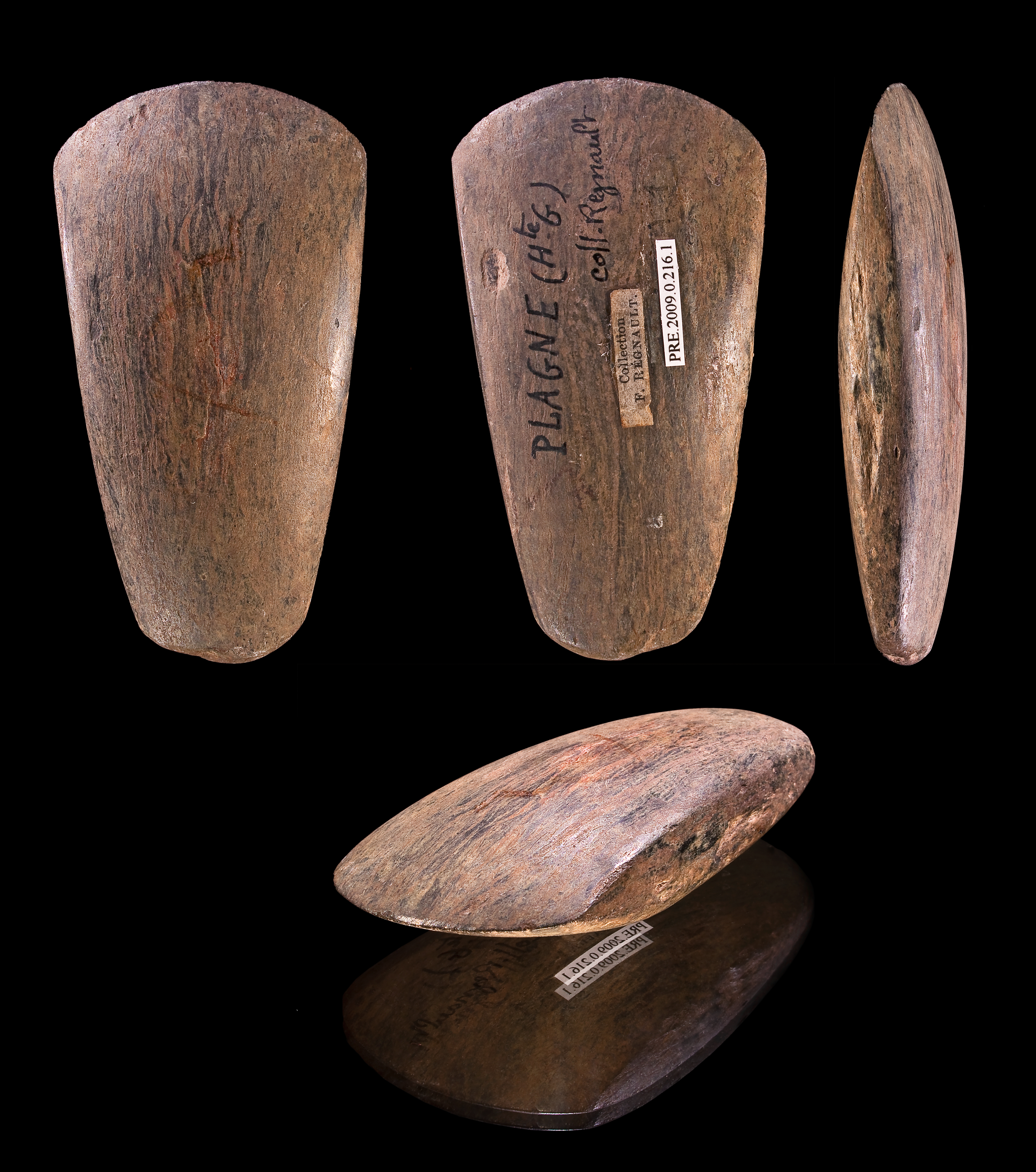
Polished Neolithic axe from Plagne Haute-Garonne collection Félix Régnault collection

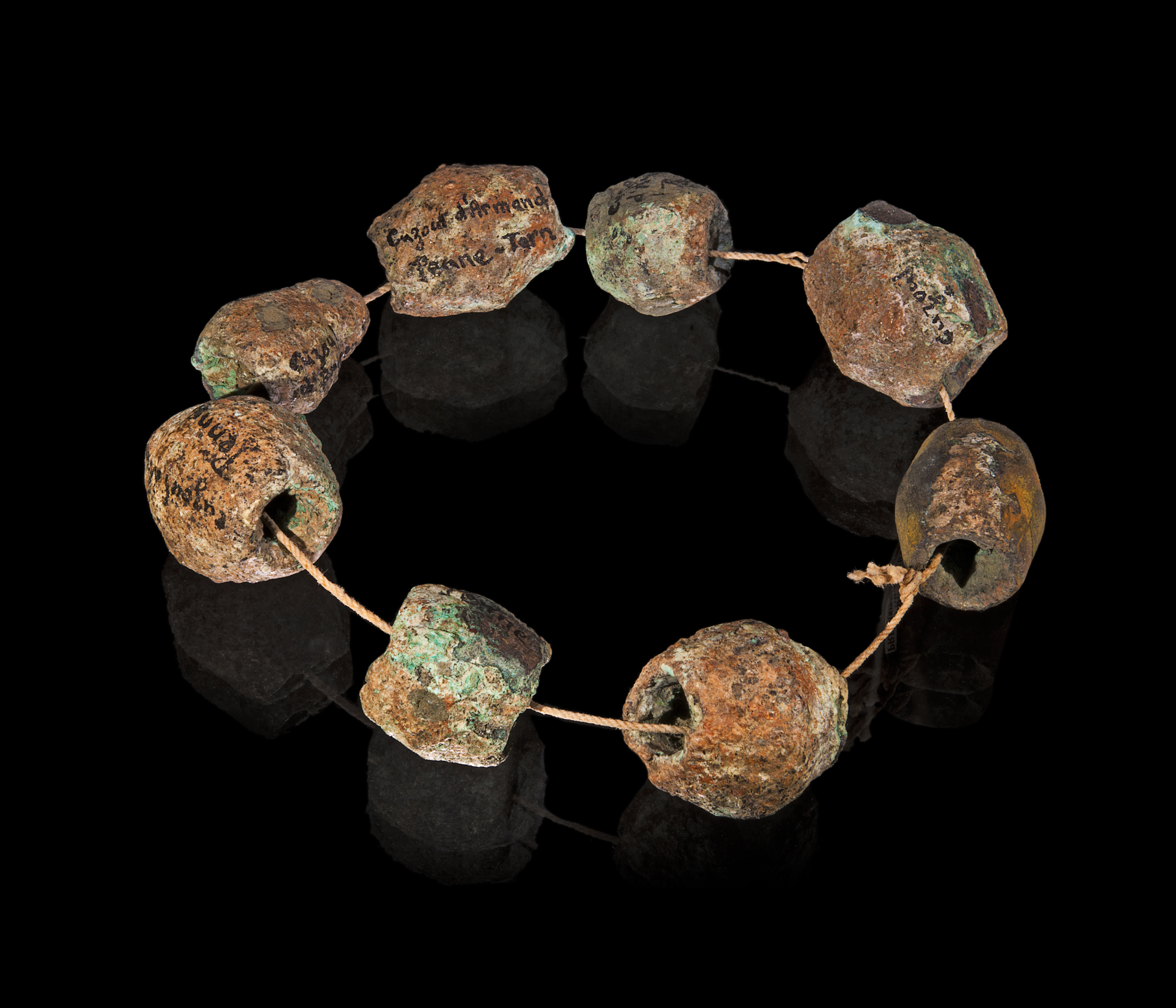
Bronze bead necklace Holocene Bronze Age Jean-Baptiste Noulet collection

=== Botany ===
- The herbarium contains historic specimens collected by Benjamin Balansa (1825–1891).
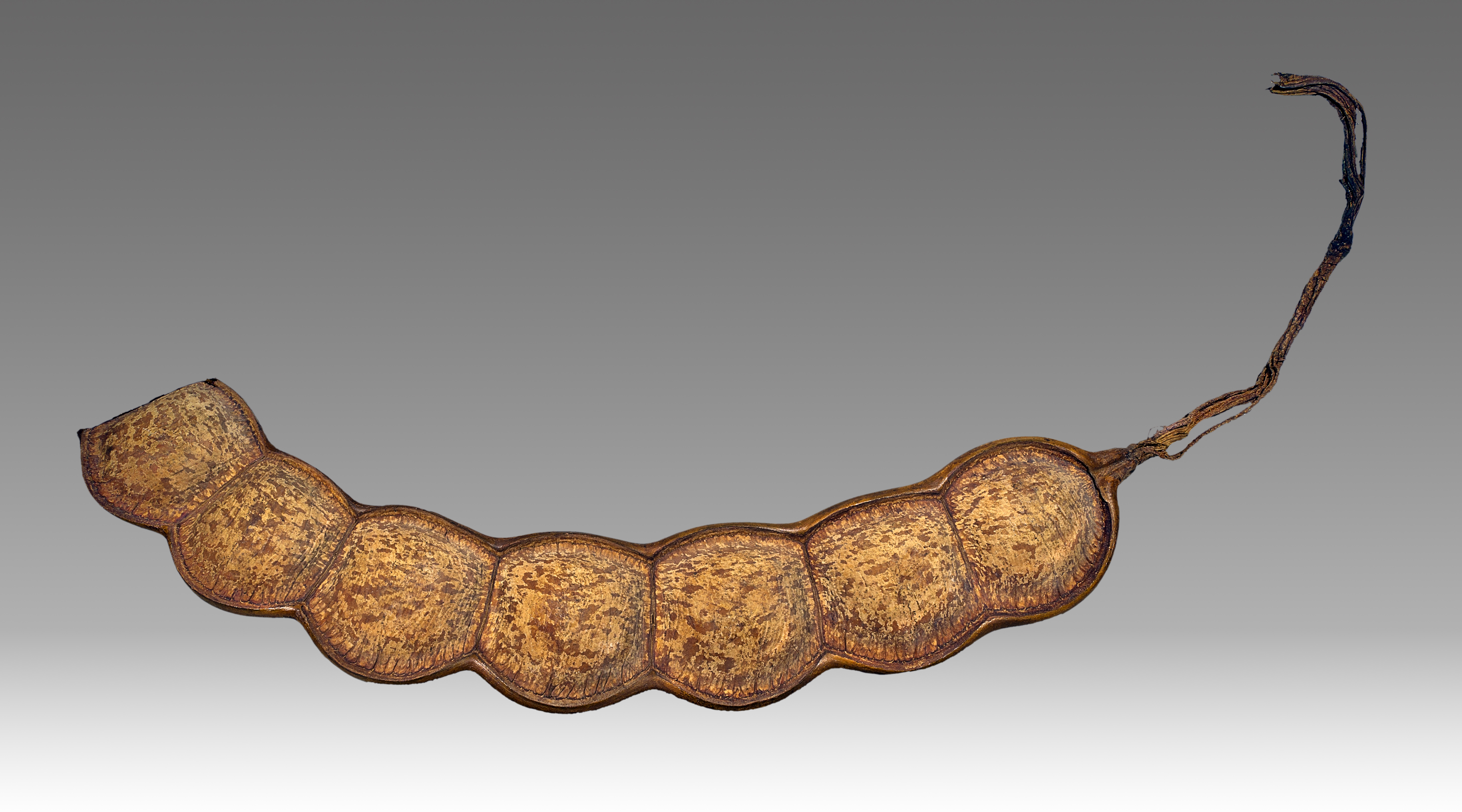
Entada phaseoloides – fruit

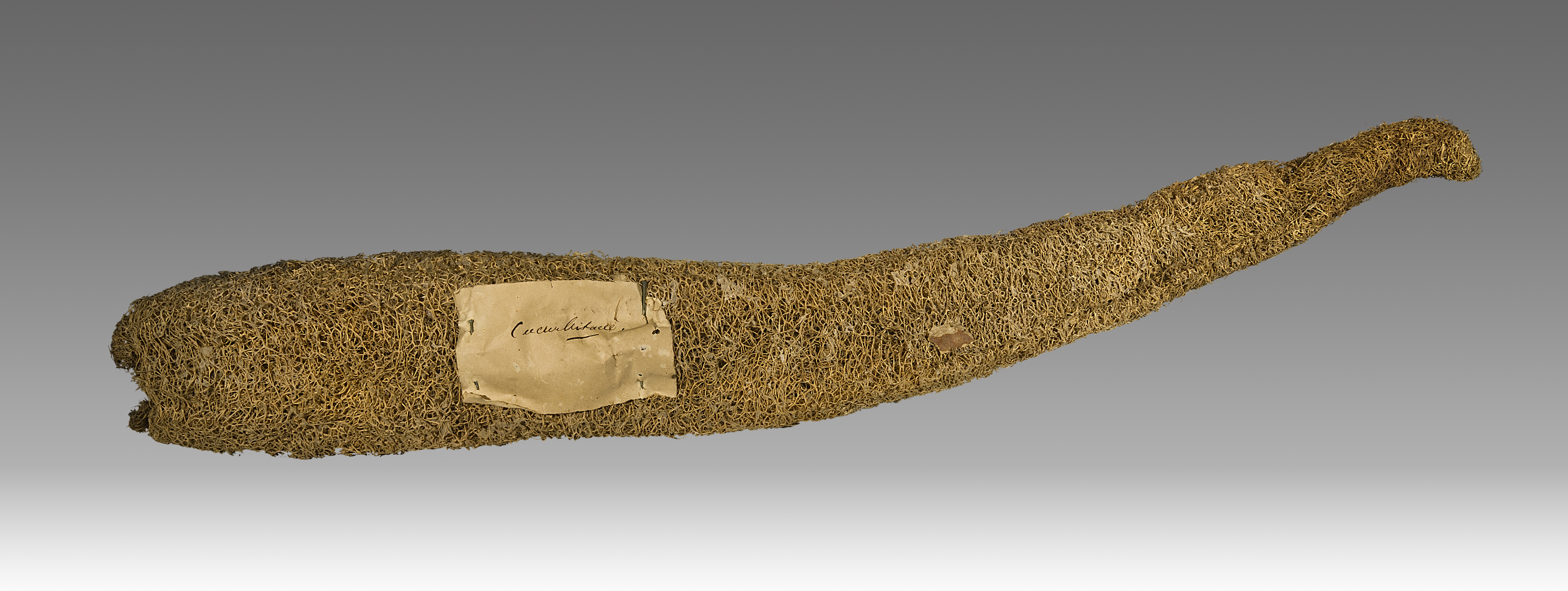
Luffa aegyptiaca – fibrous skeleton

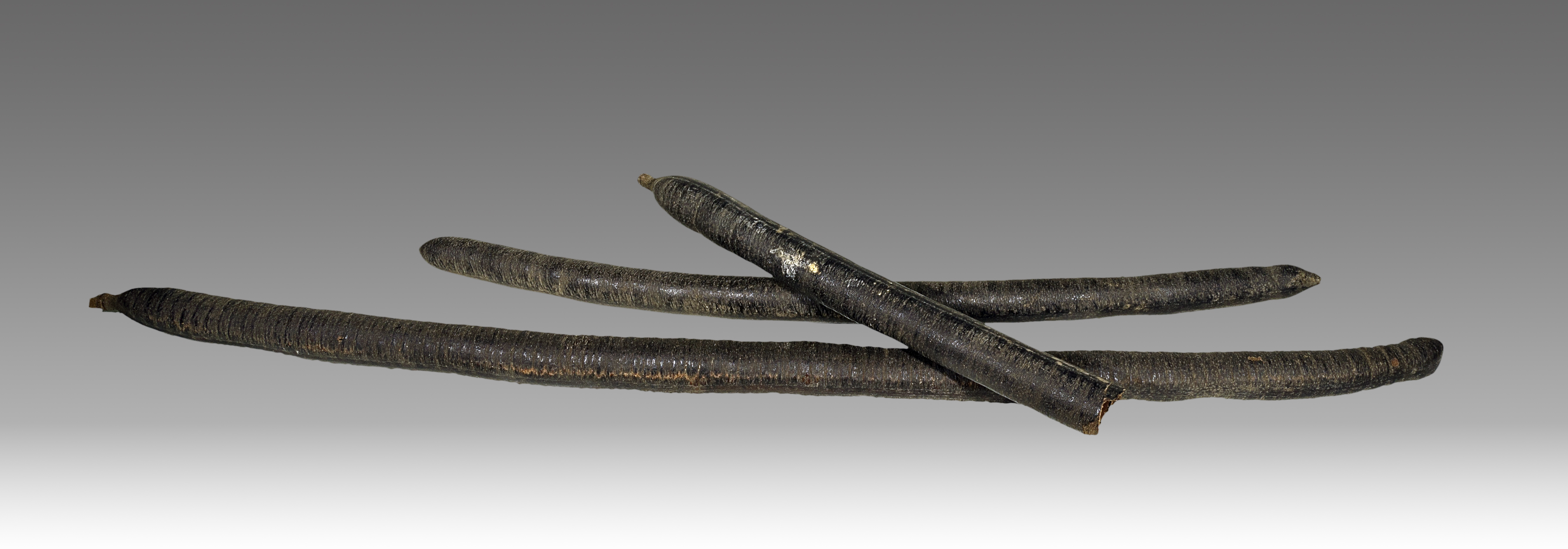
Cassia fistula – ripe fruit

=== Entomology ===
==== Coleoptera ====
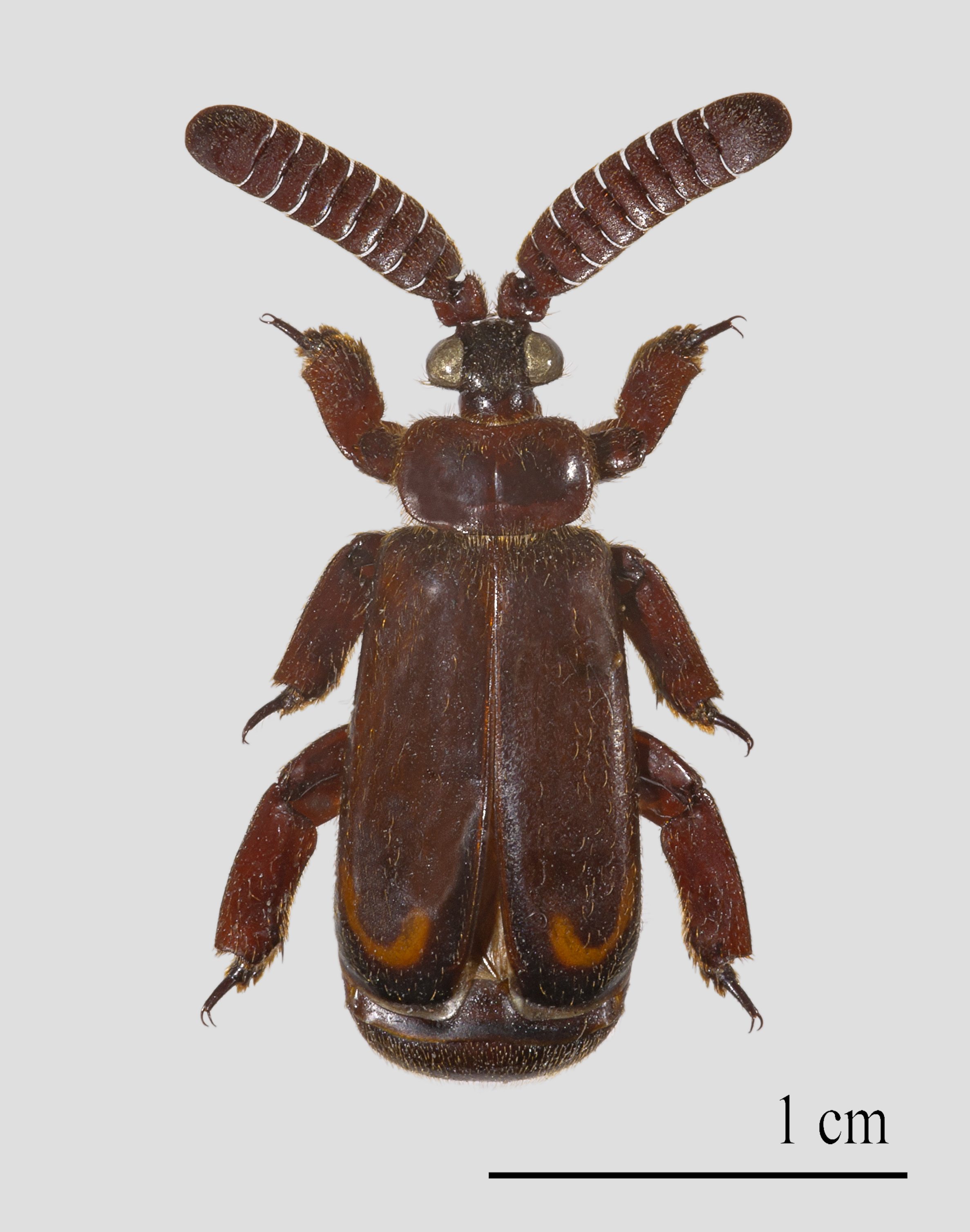
Cerapterus pilipennis - Zambia

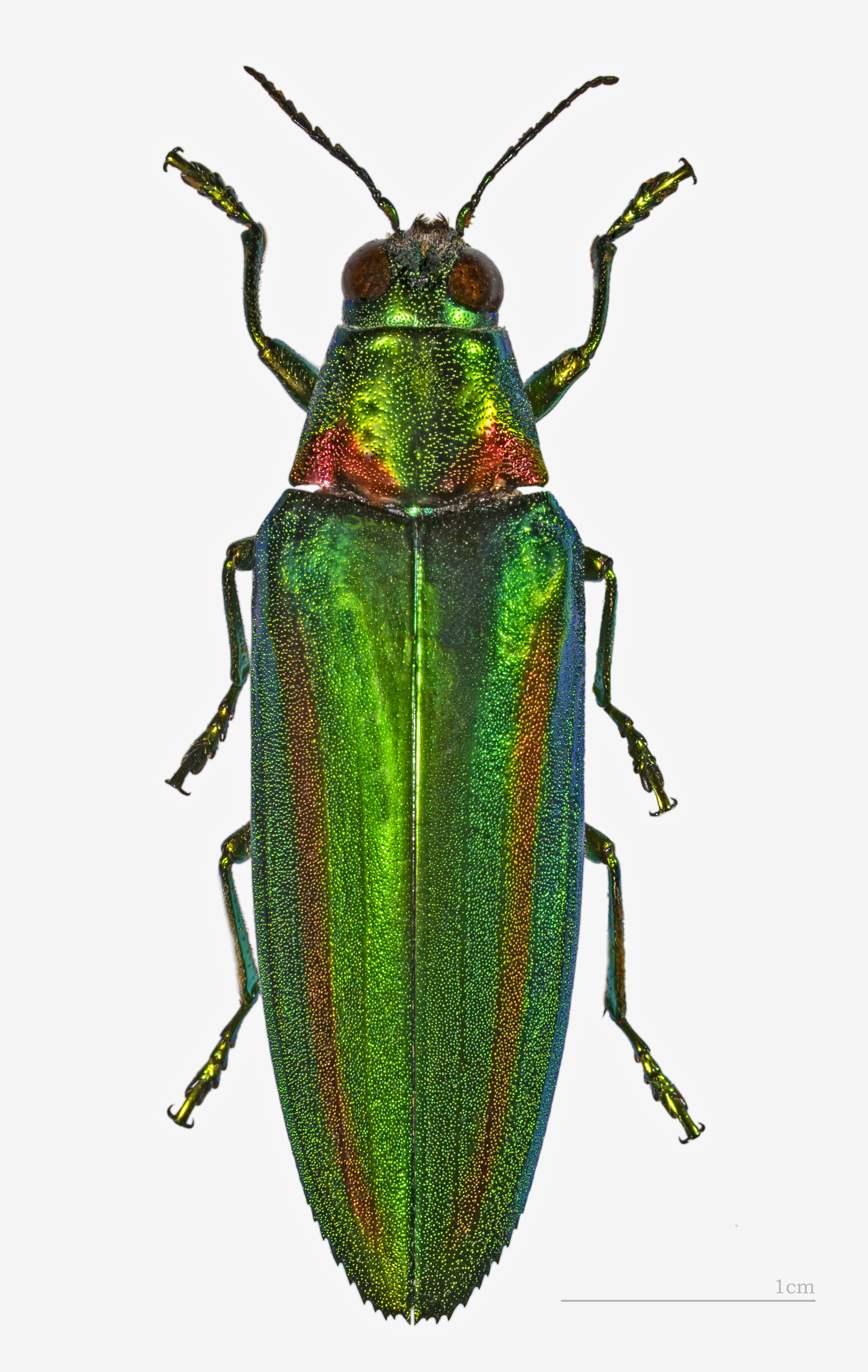
Chrysochroa rajah thailandica - Chiang Mai, Thailand

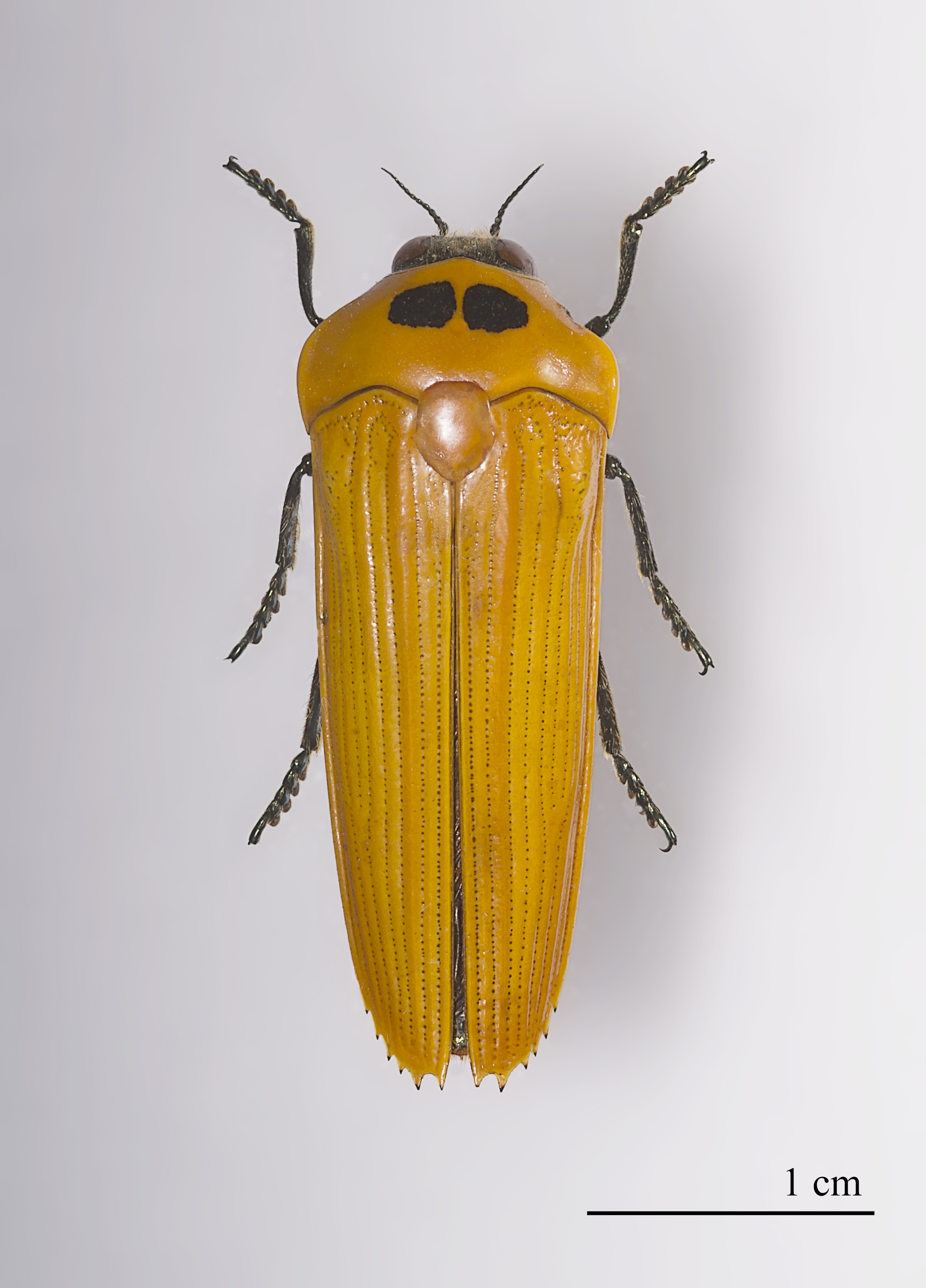
Hiperantha testacea
Bupestrid from Colombia

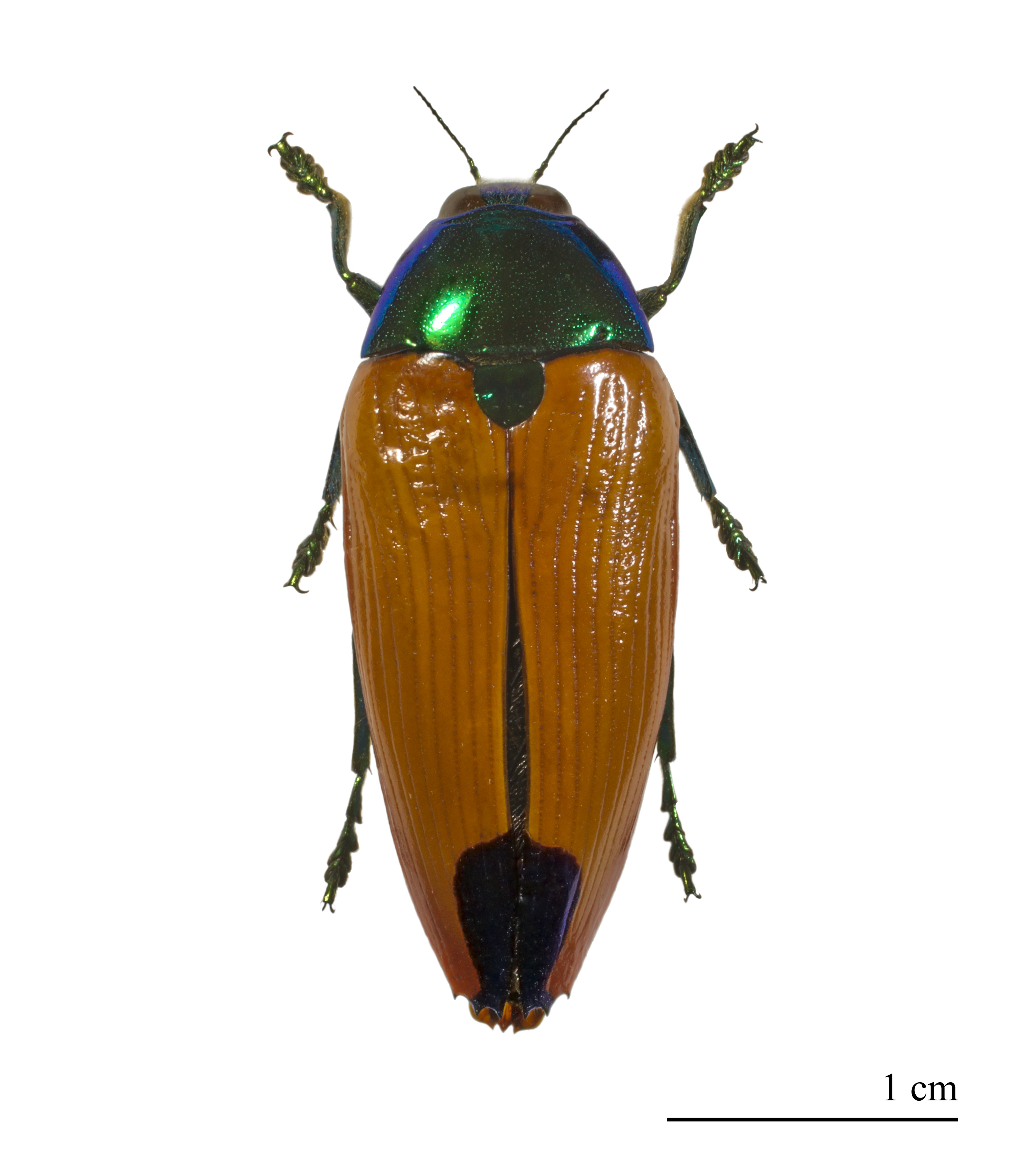
Metaxymorpha gloriosa Bupestrid from North Queensland, Australia

==== Lepidoptera ====
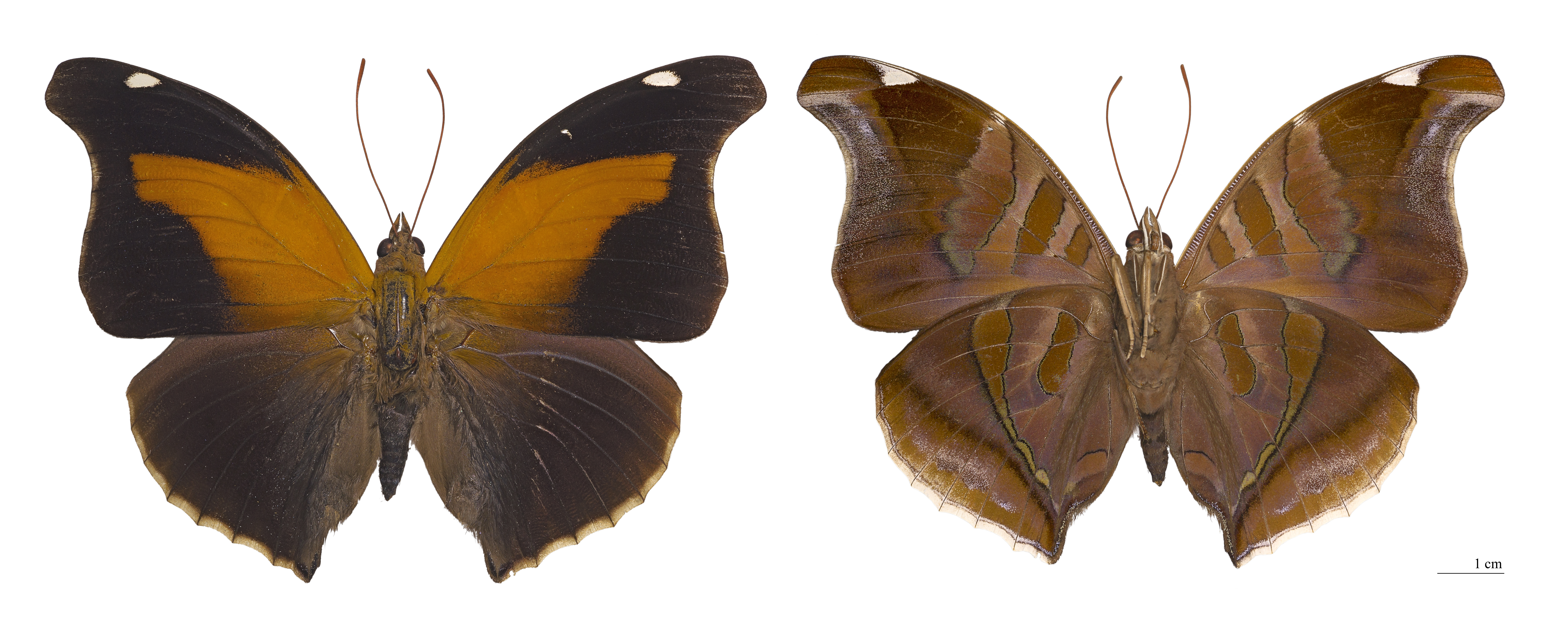
Historis odius - Colombia

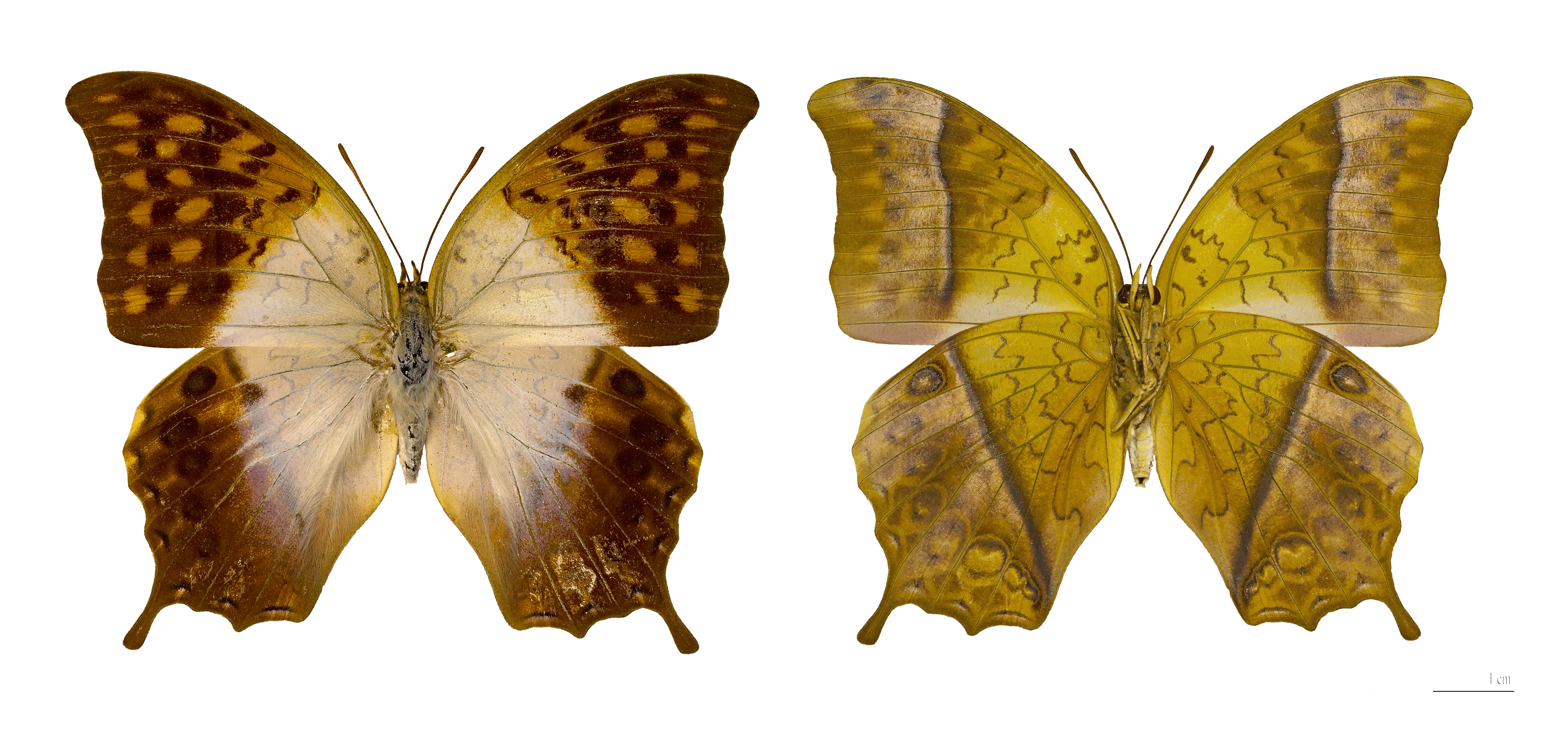
Charaxes varanes vologeses - Malawi

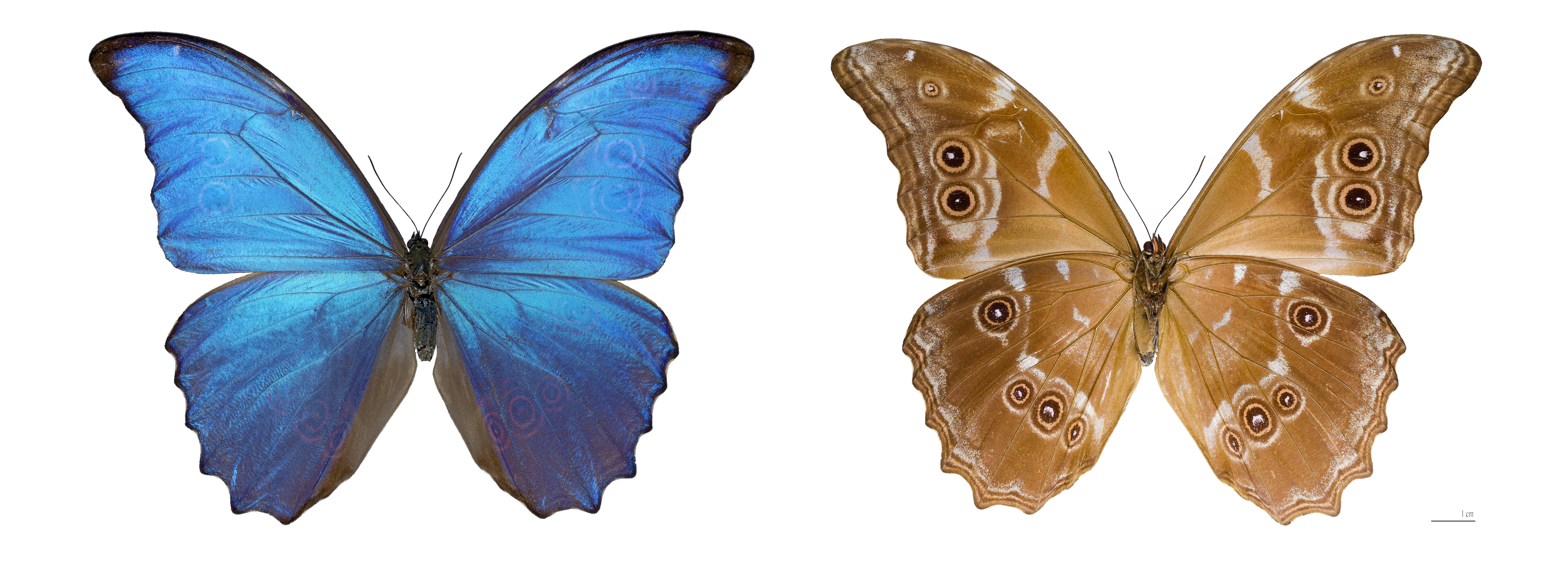
Morpho didius - Peru

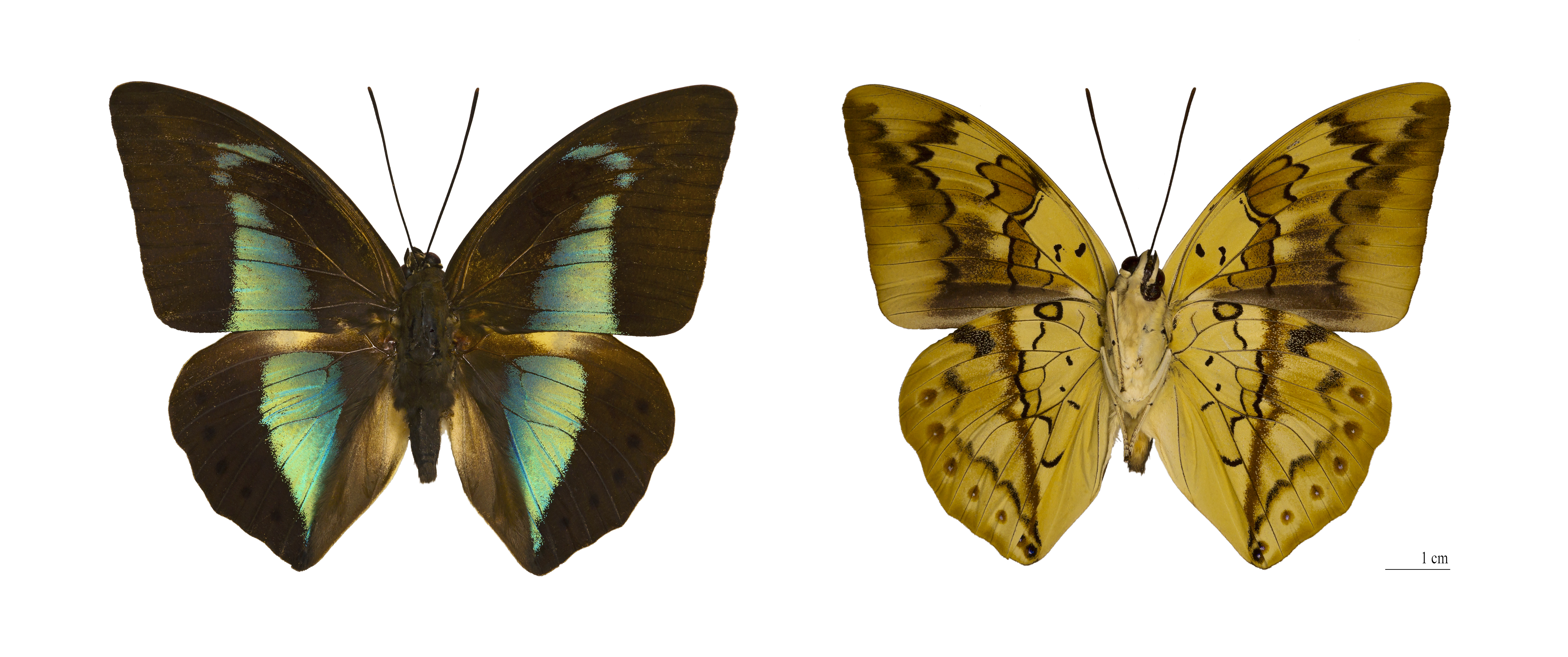
Archaeoprepona licomedes - Brazil

==== Orthoptera ====
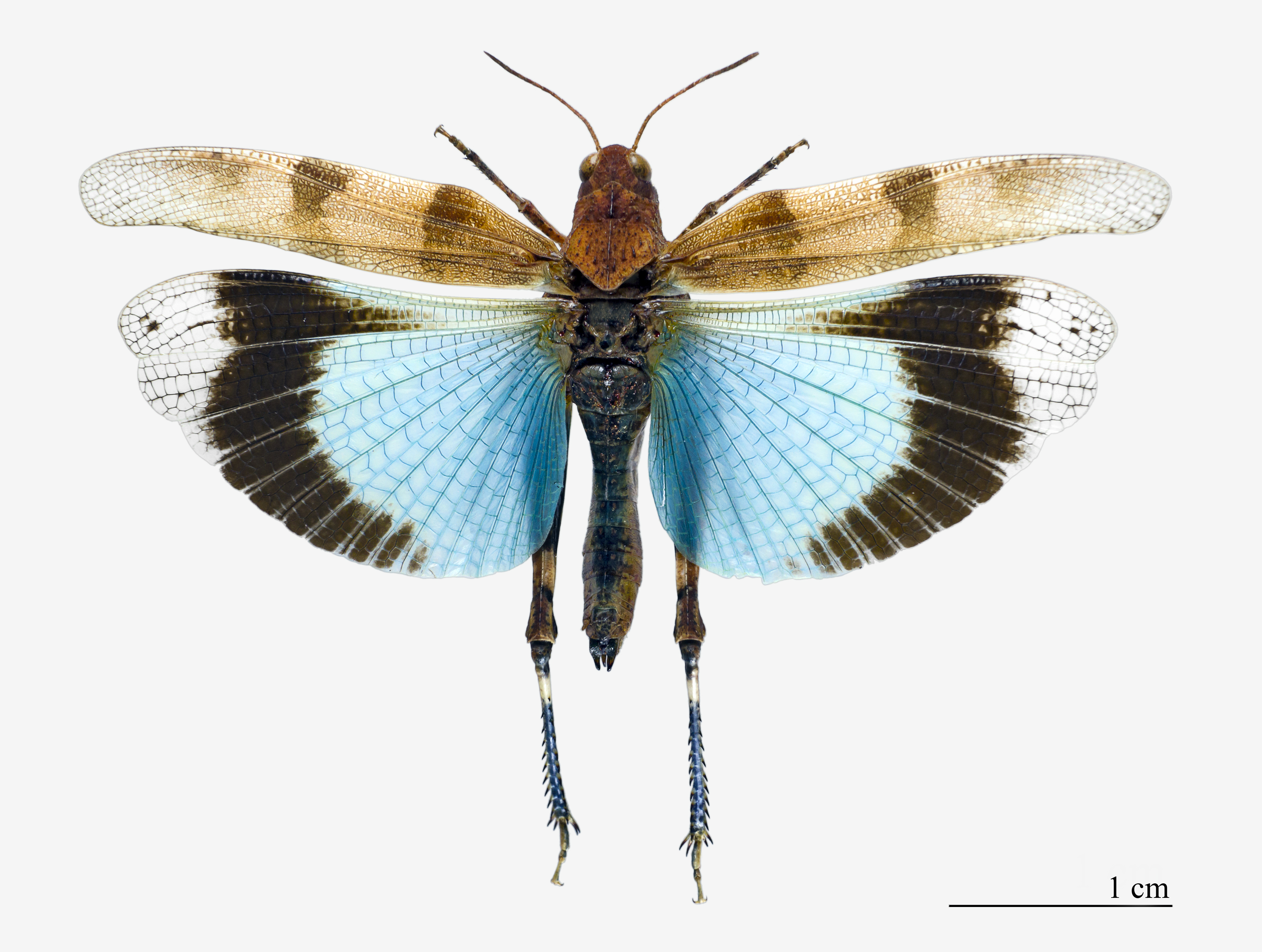
Oedipoda caerulescens - Etang de la Maourine Toulouse

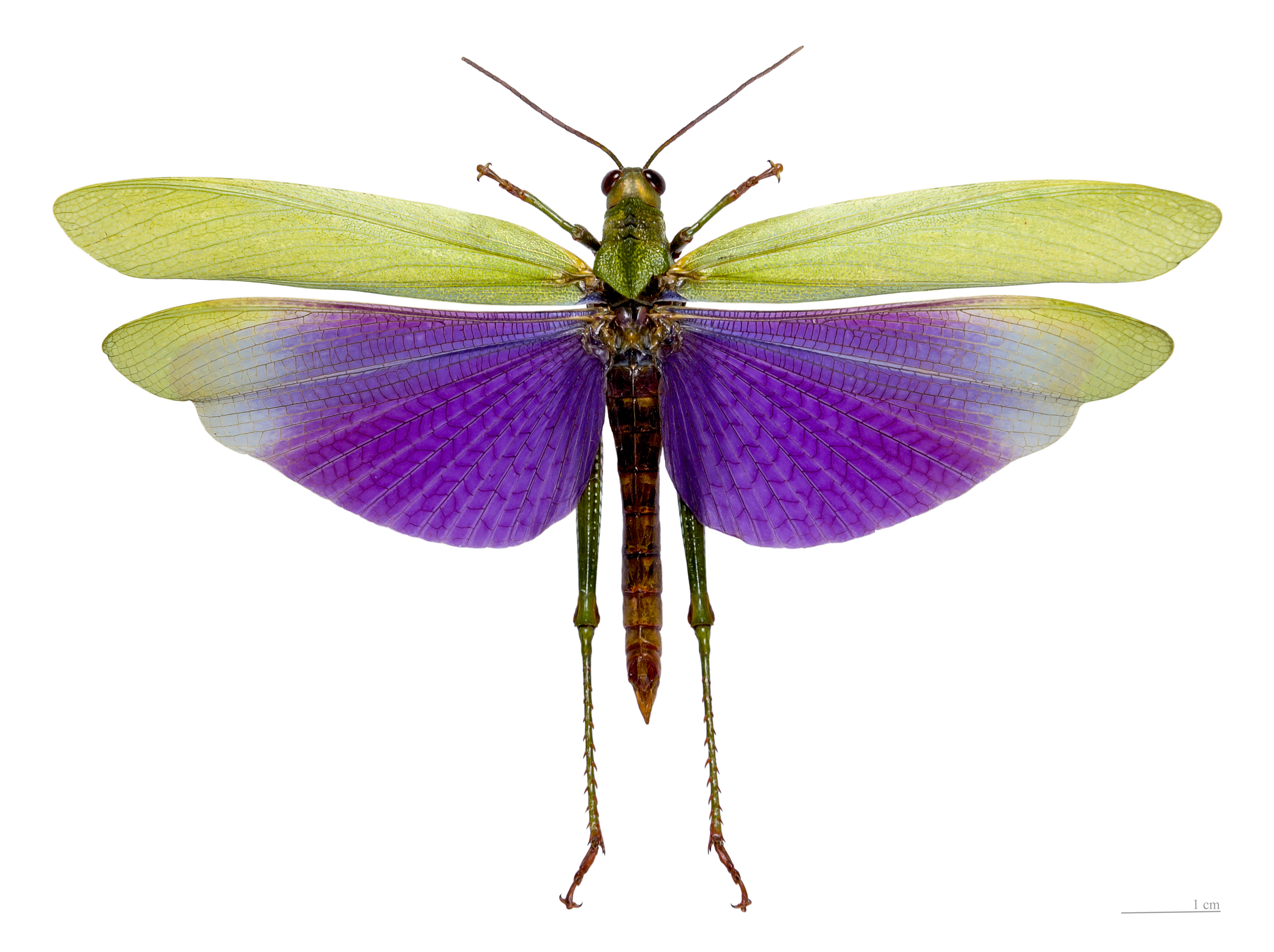
Titanacris albipes- French Guiana

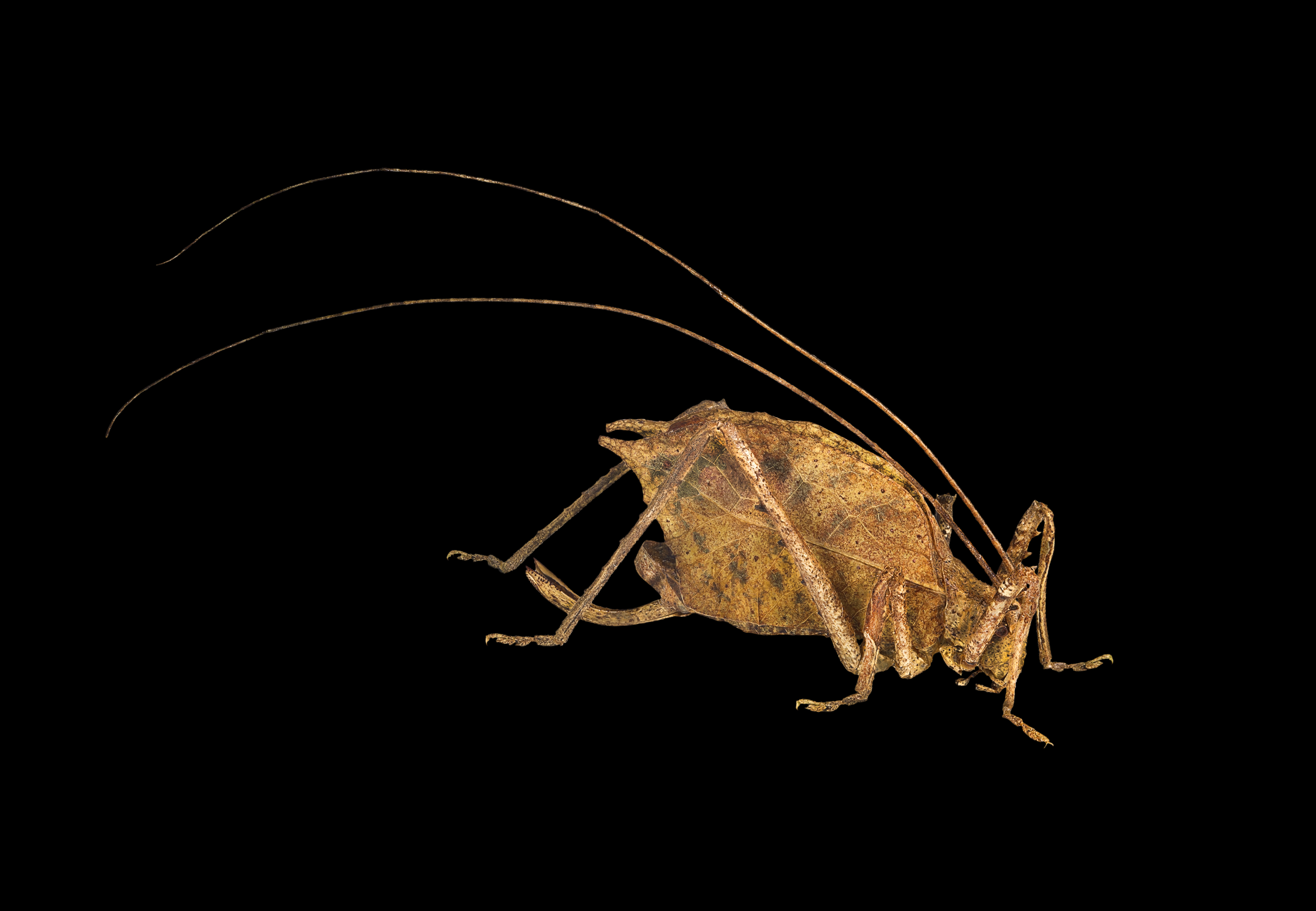
Porphyromma speciosa-French Guiana

=== Mineralogy ===
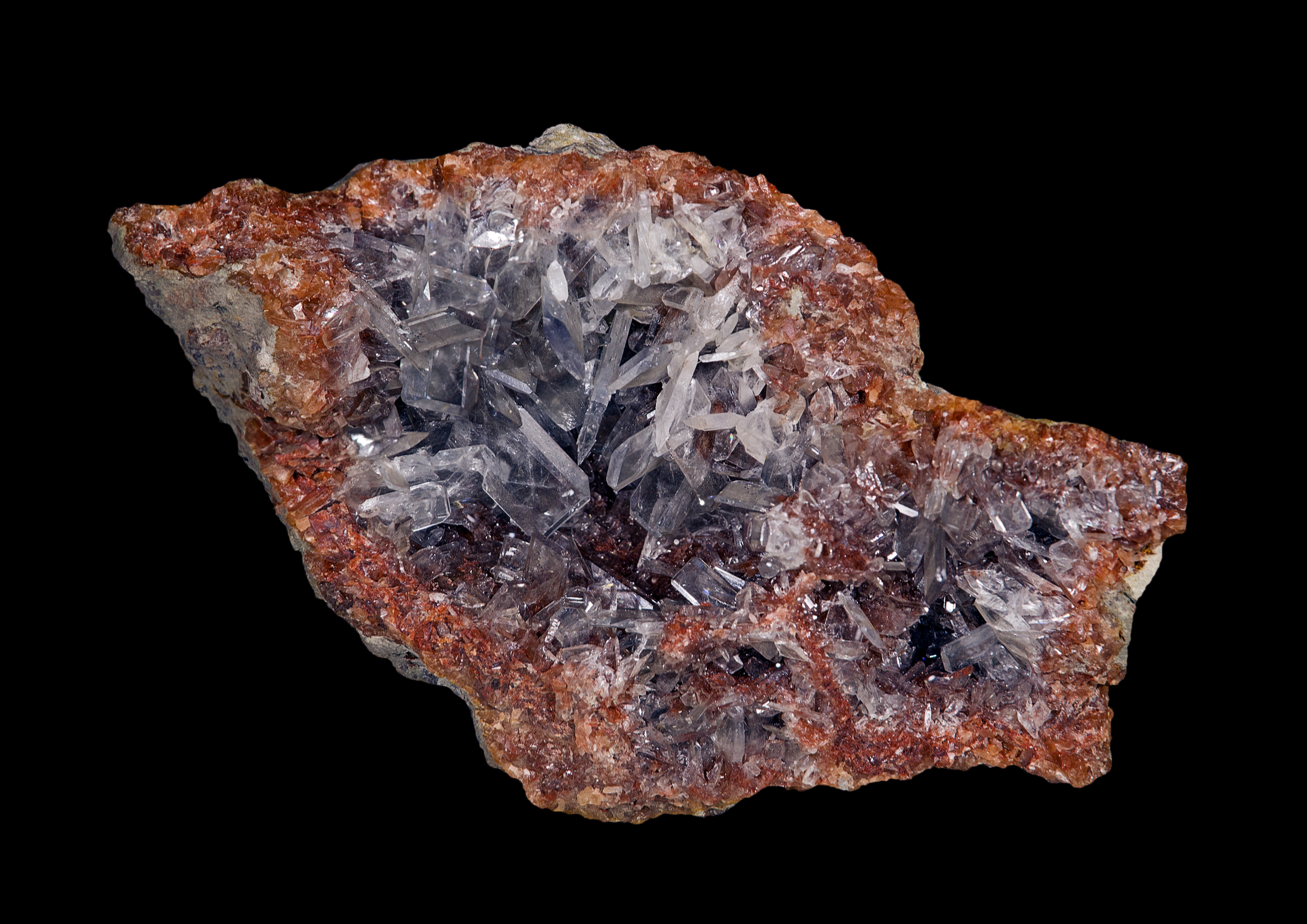
Celestine - Turkmenistan

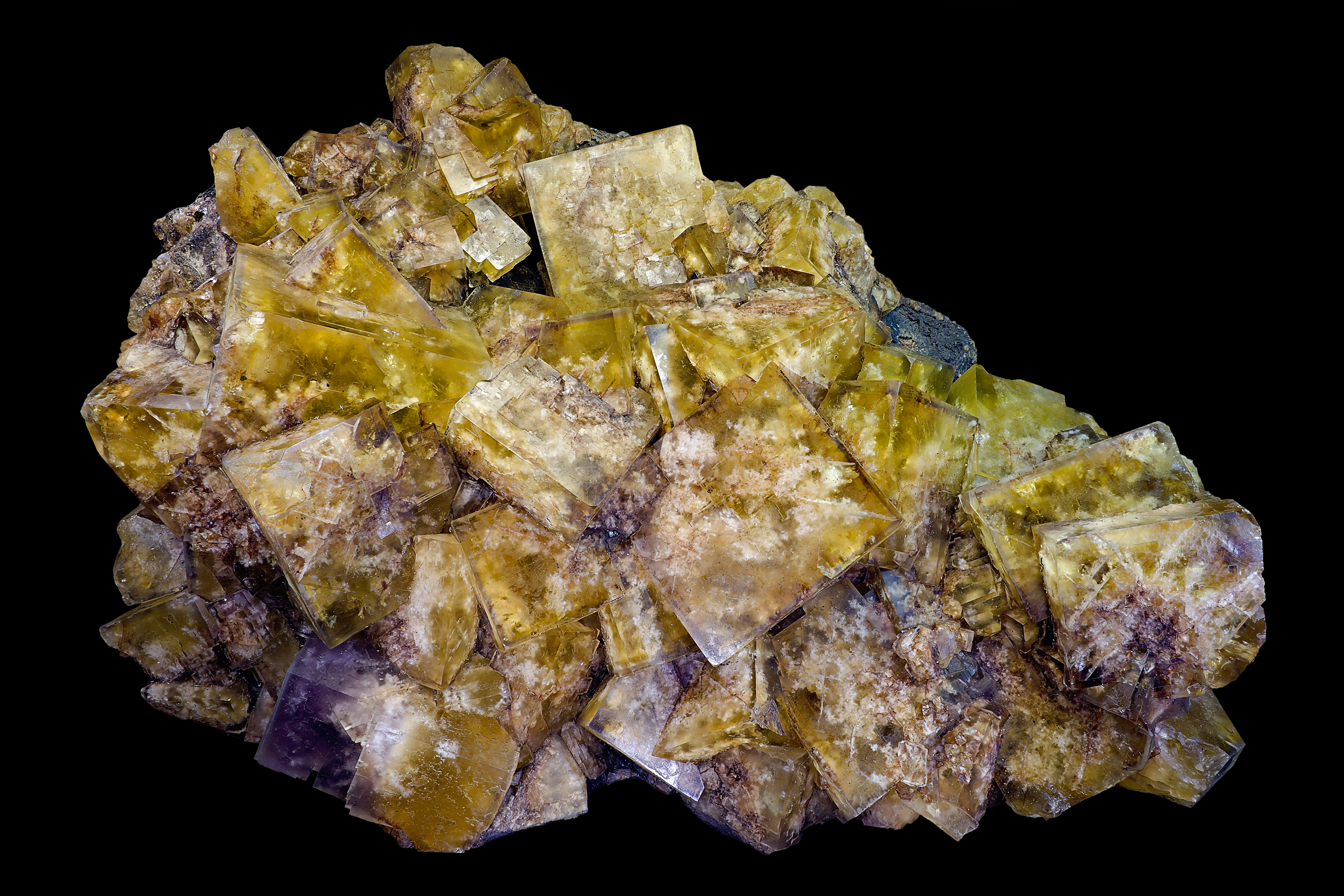
Fluorite - France

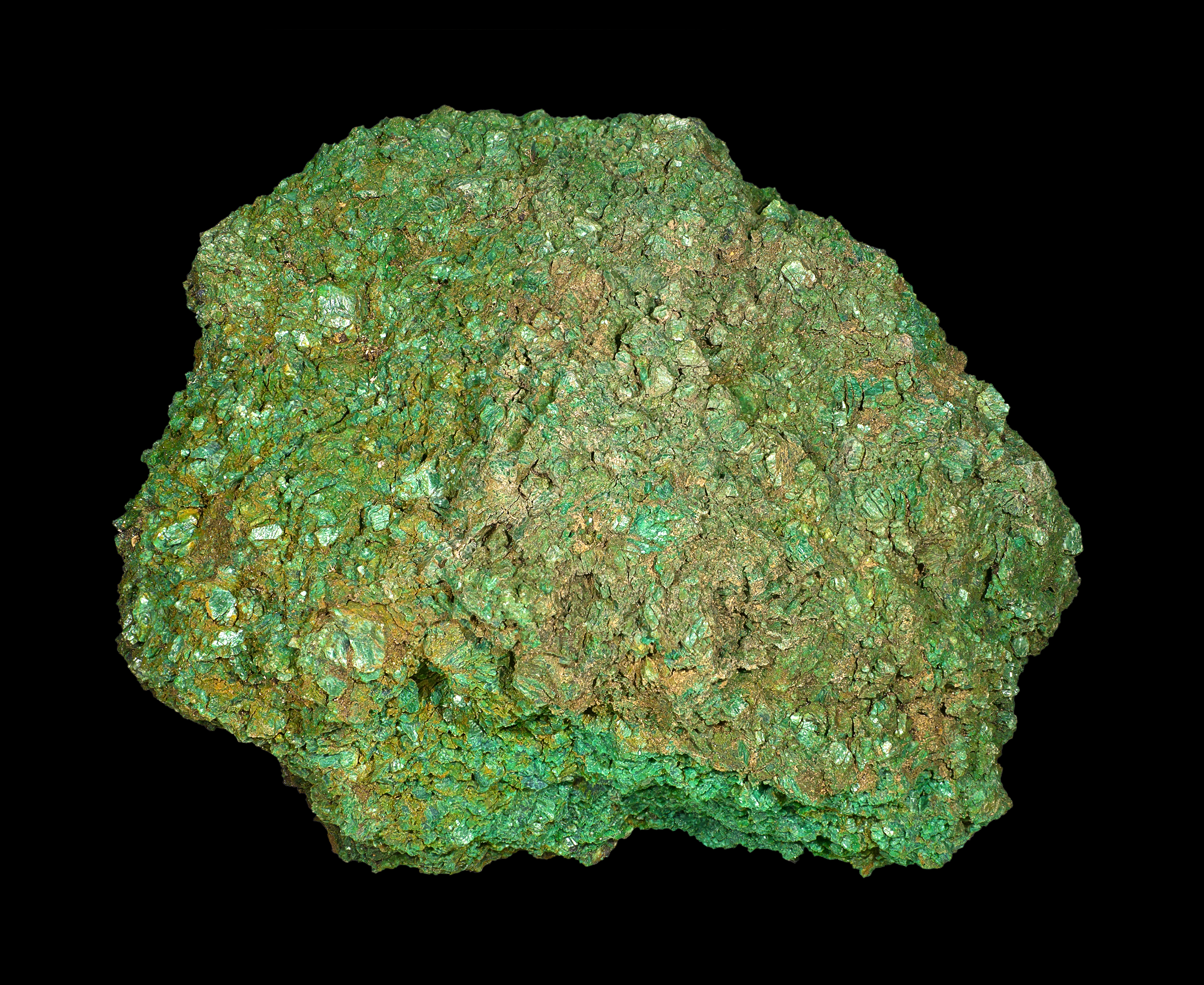
Nepouite - New Caledonia

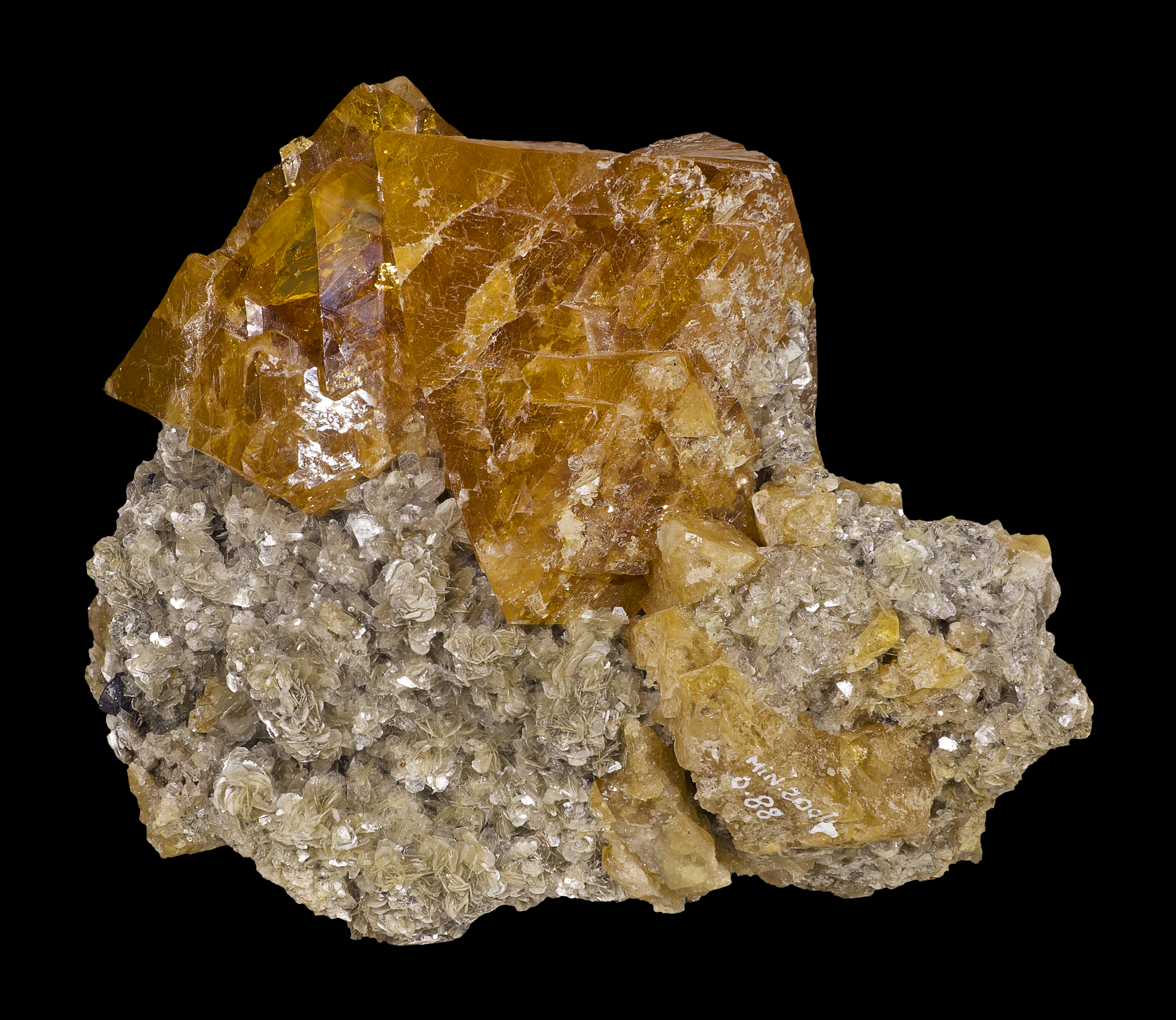
Scheelite - China

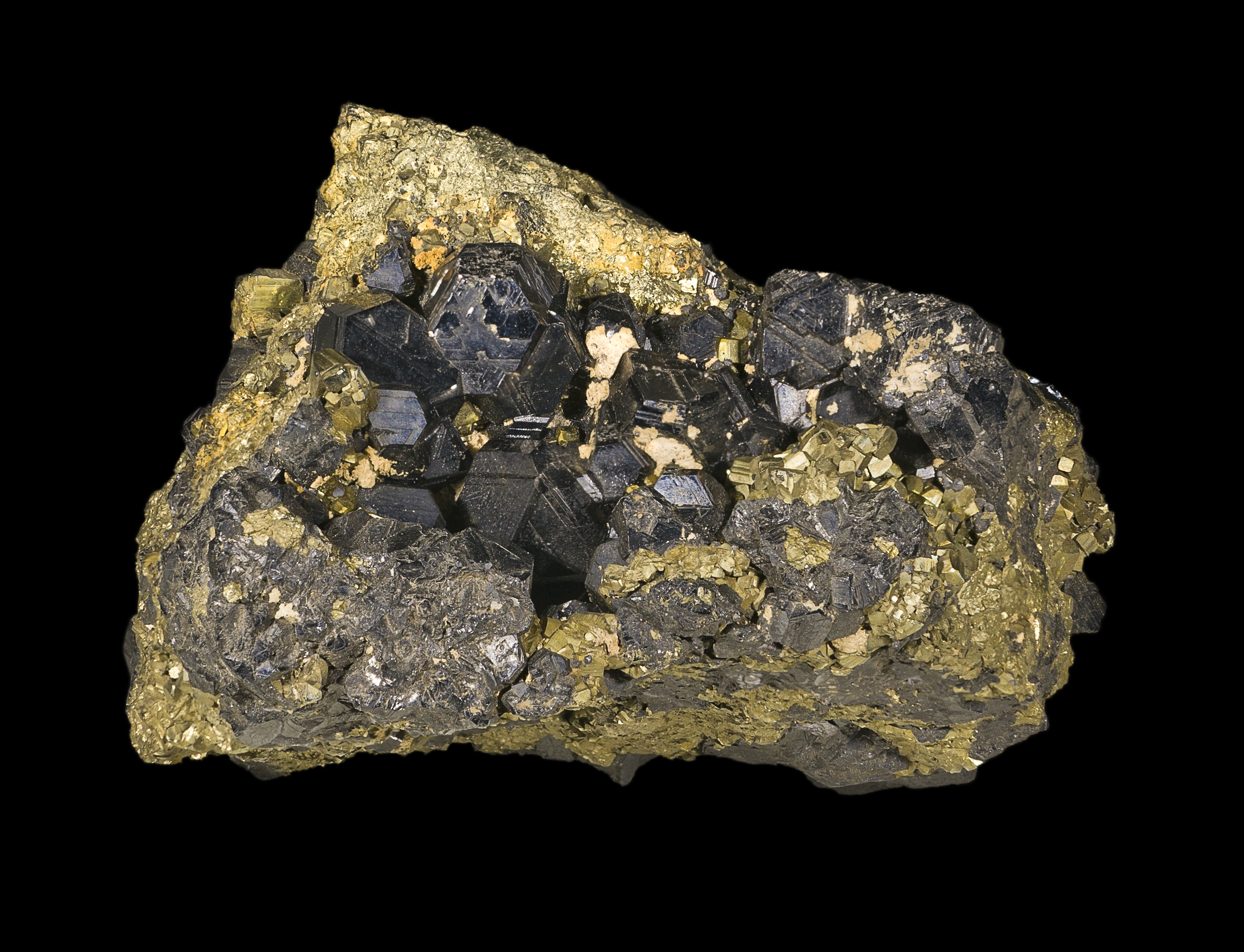
Sphalerite - Roumania

=== Ornithology ===
- The bird collection of MHNT contains more than 30,000 specimens, of which 20,000 are eggs. About 8,500 bird mounts and 1,500 scientific bird skins are included. Other bird items are around 2,000 skeletons and skulls and 5,300 eggs. The collection focuses on Europe (especially France), but the collection also has exotic species . Most are documented on card or computer systems.
- The bird mount collection of Victor Besaucèle, with 5,000 specimens, is one of the most important historic collections in Europe.
- Other collectors represented are R. Bourret, G. Cossaune, M. Gourdon, Hammonville, A. Lacroix, and Reboussin.
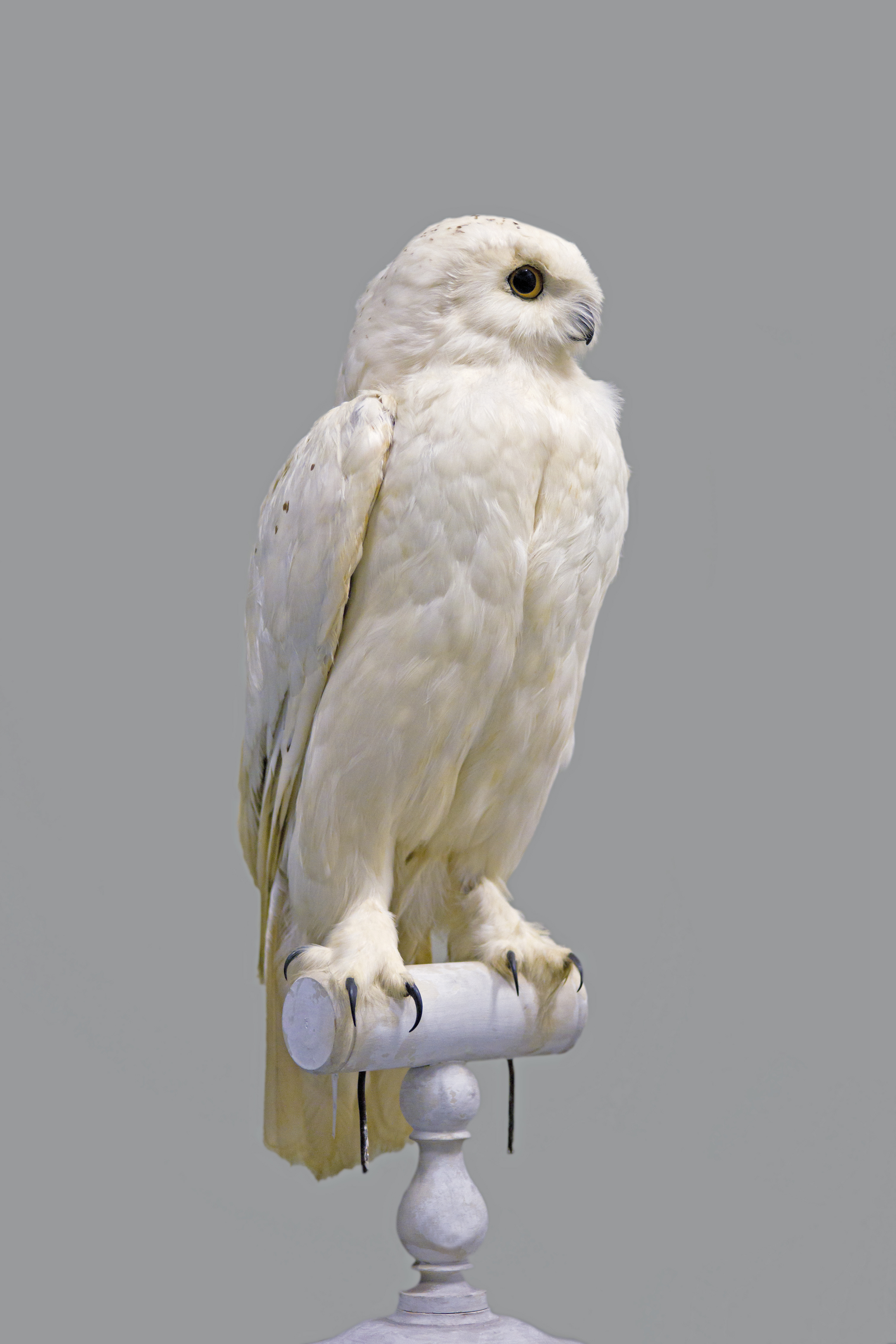
Snowy owl: The oldest mount in the museum, collected by Mr Dode in 1807

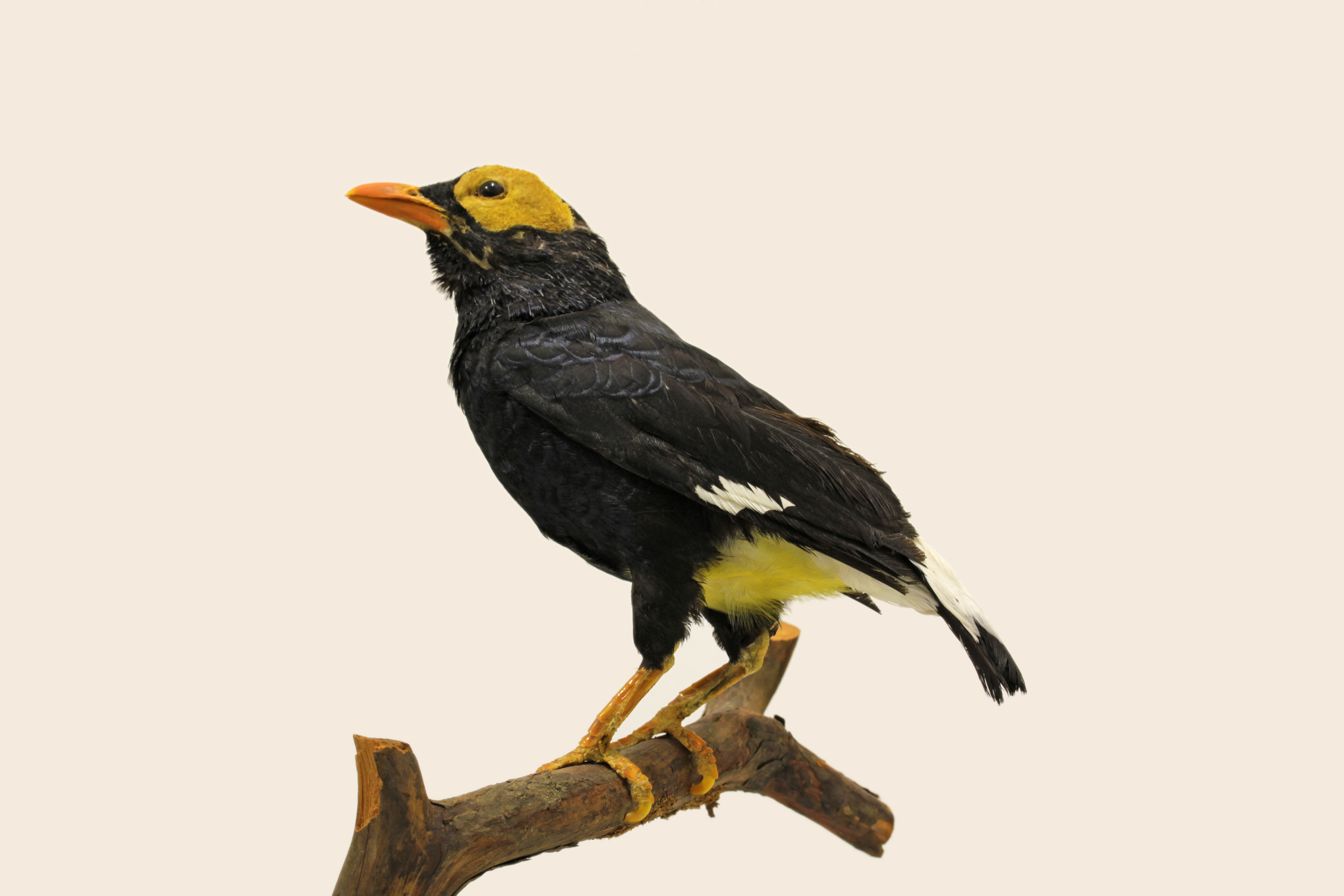
Yellow-faced myna

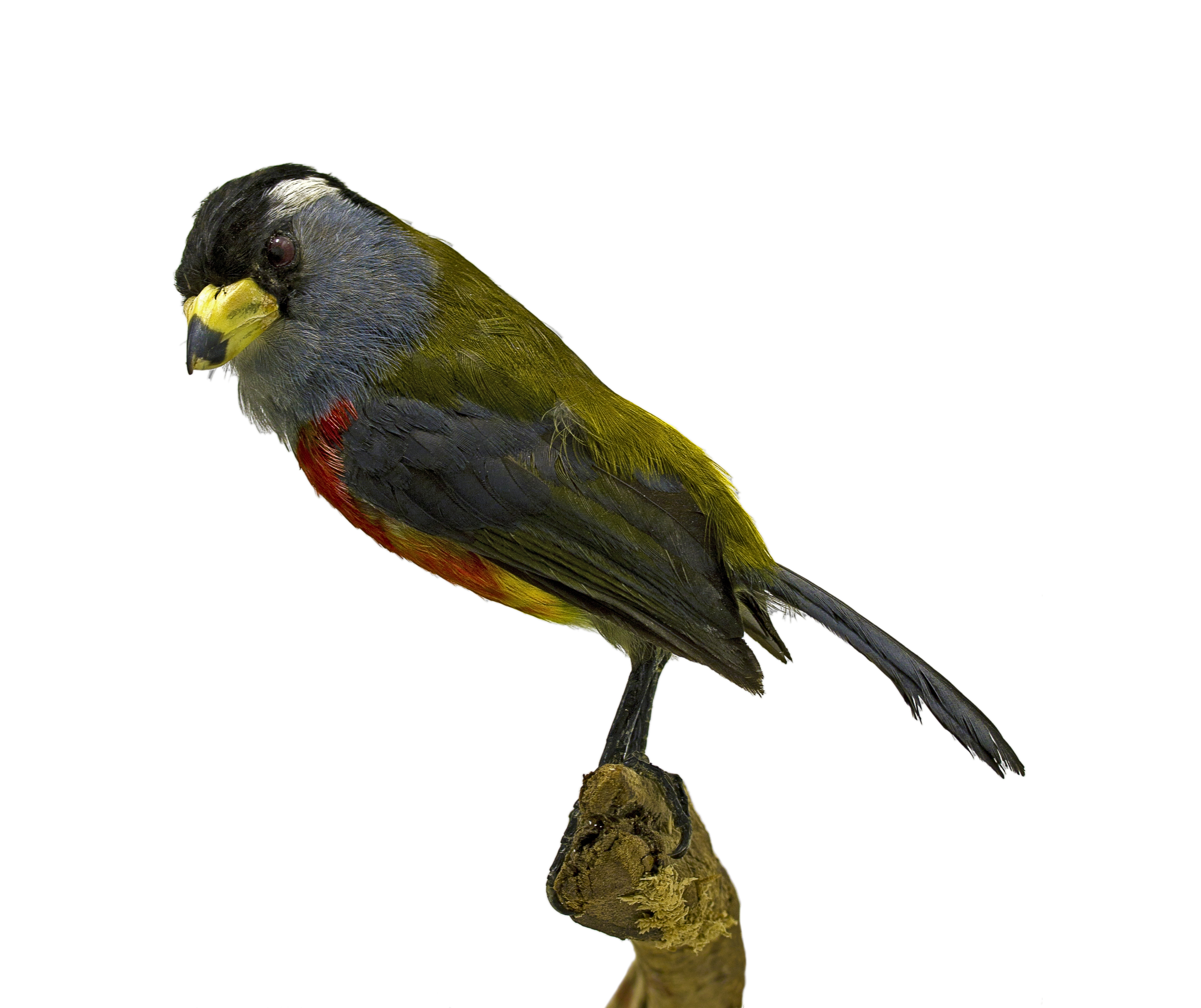
Toucan barbet
- The egg collection of Jacques Perrin de Brichambaut (1920–2007) was acquired in 2010. It contains his personal collections, supplemented by those of other ornithologists, notably Georges Guichard, Henri Heim de Balsac, and Rene de Naurois. It includes all the Palearctic species (Europe, North Africa, and Asia), about 1,000 species and nearly 15,000 eggs, and is one of the most complete and best-documented palearctic egg collections in Europe.
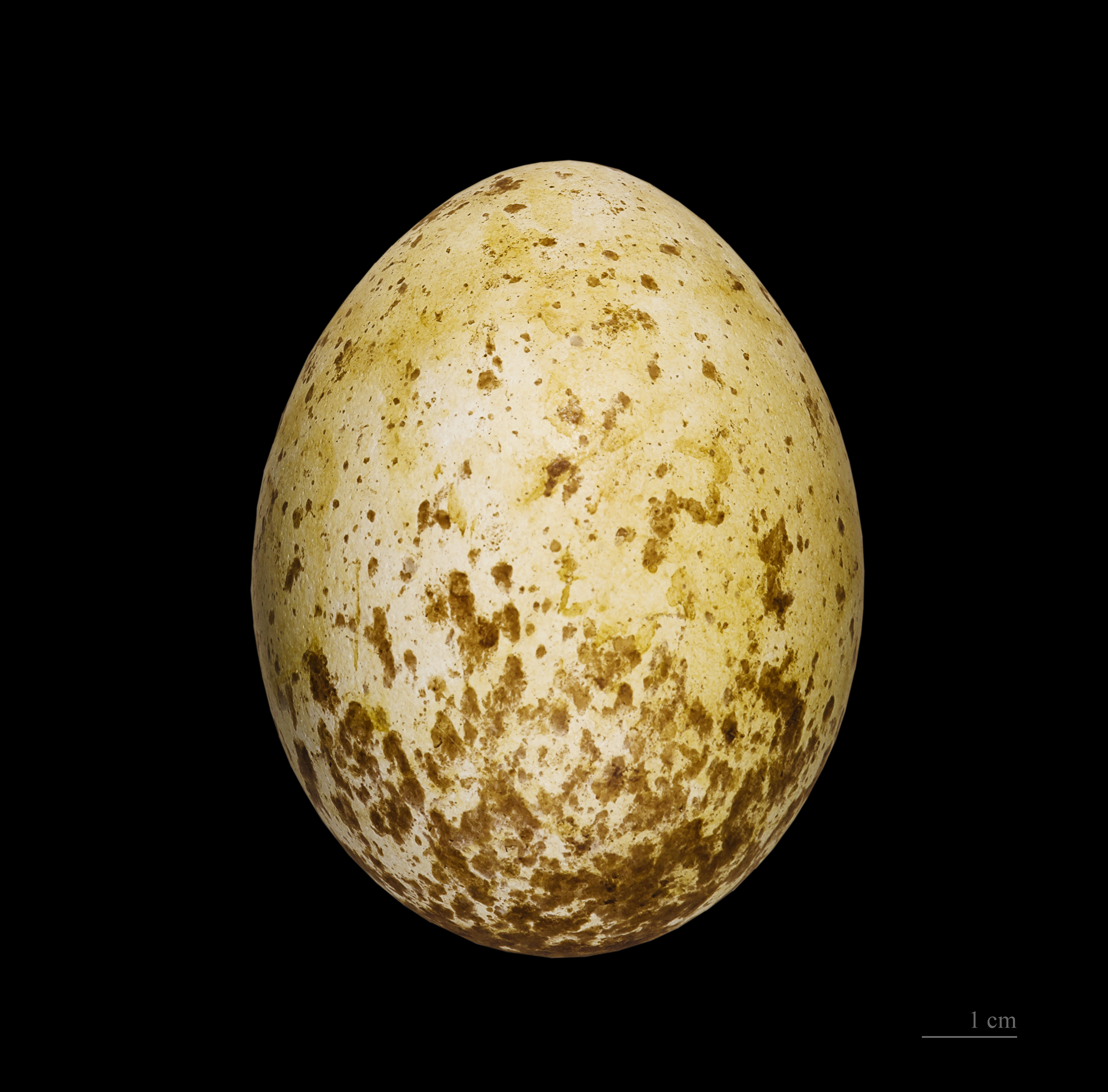
Egg of wedge-tailed eagle

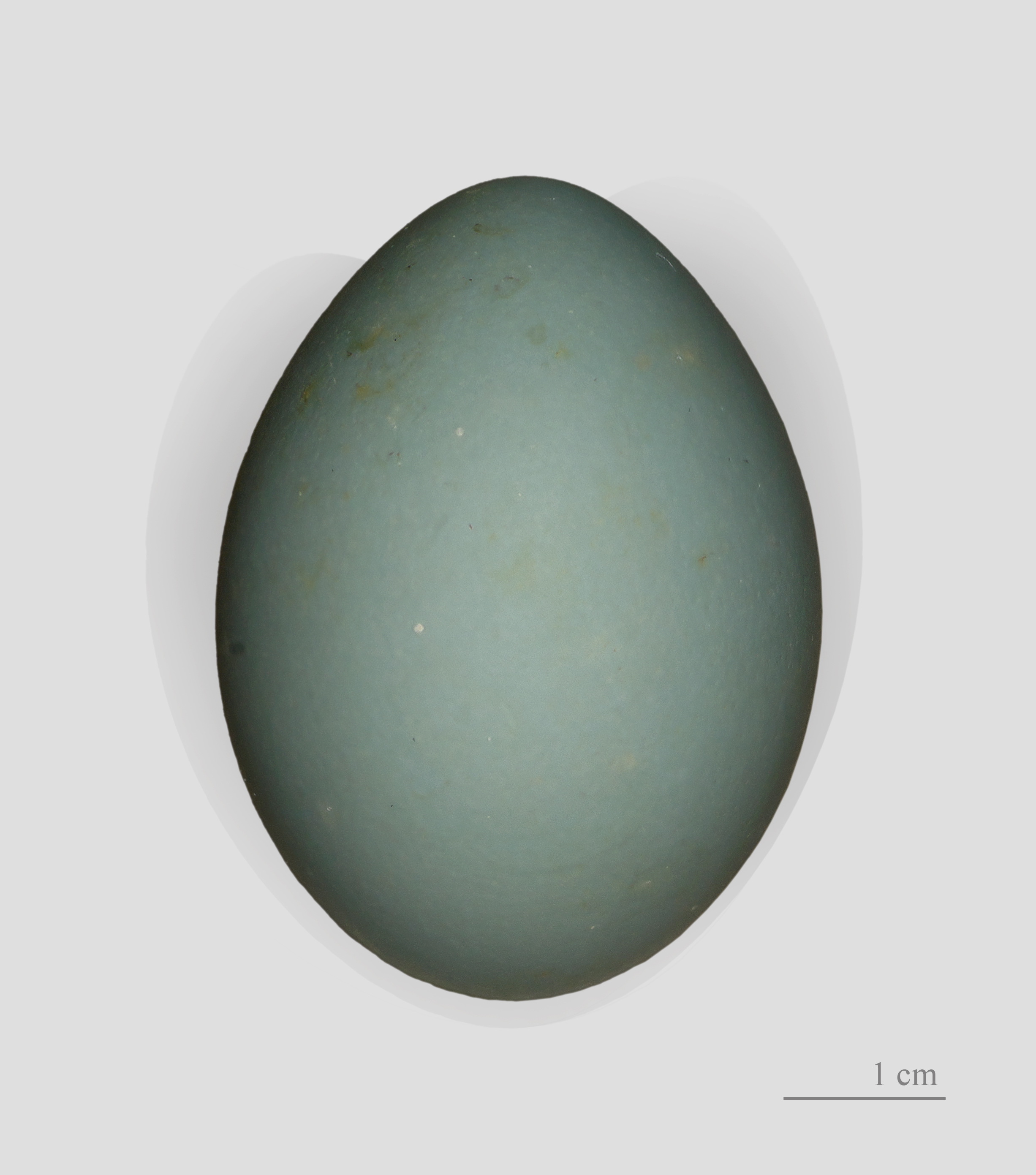
Egg of little egret

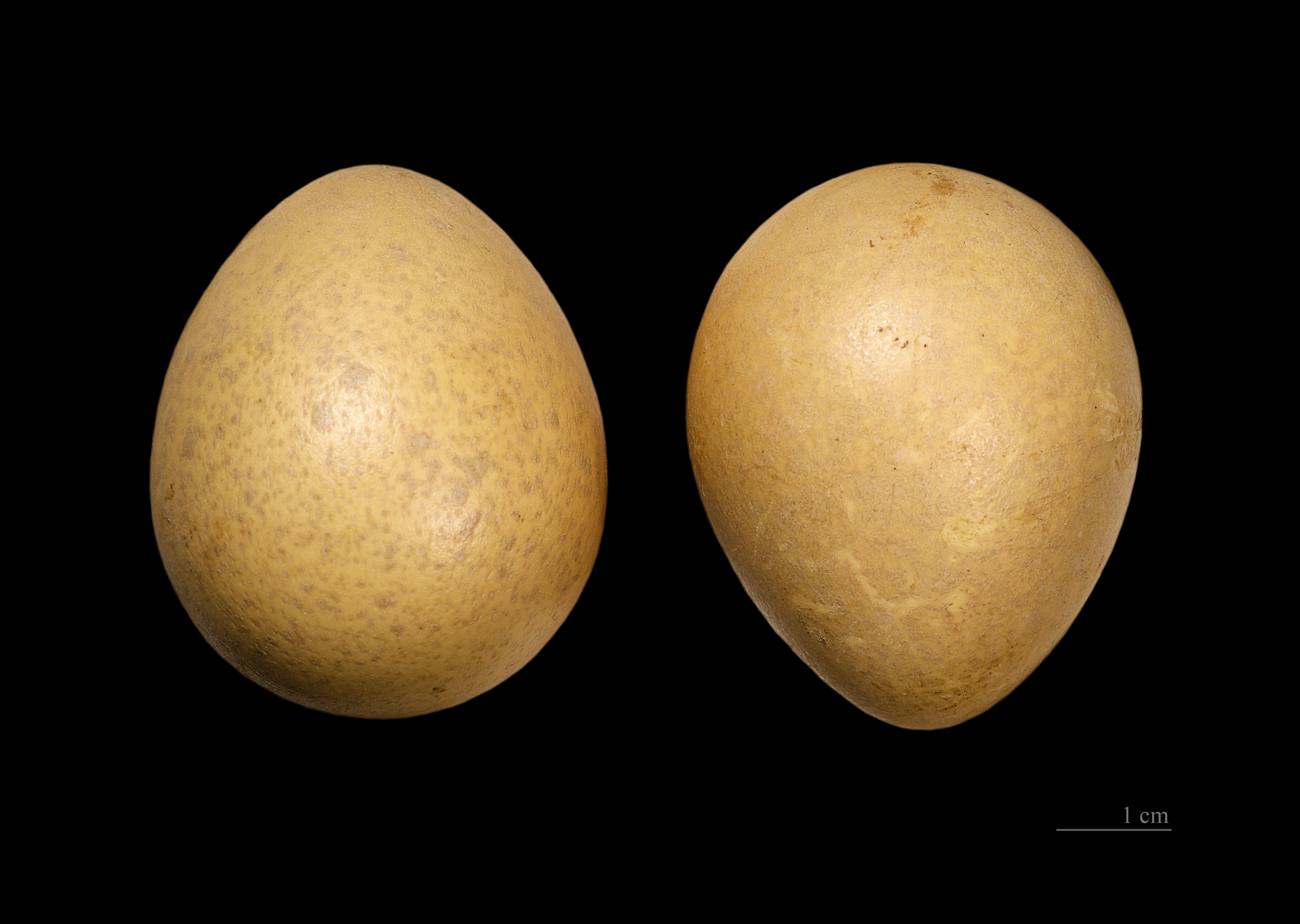
Egg of helmeted guineafowl

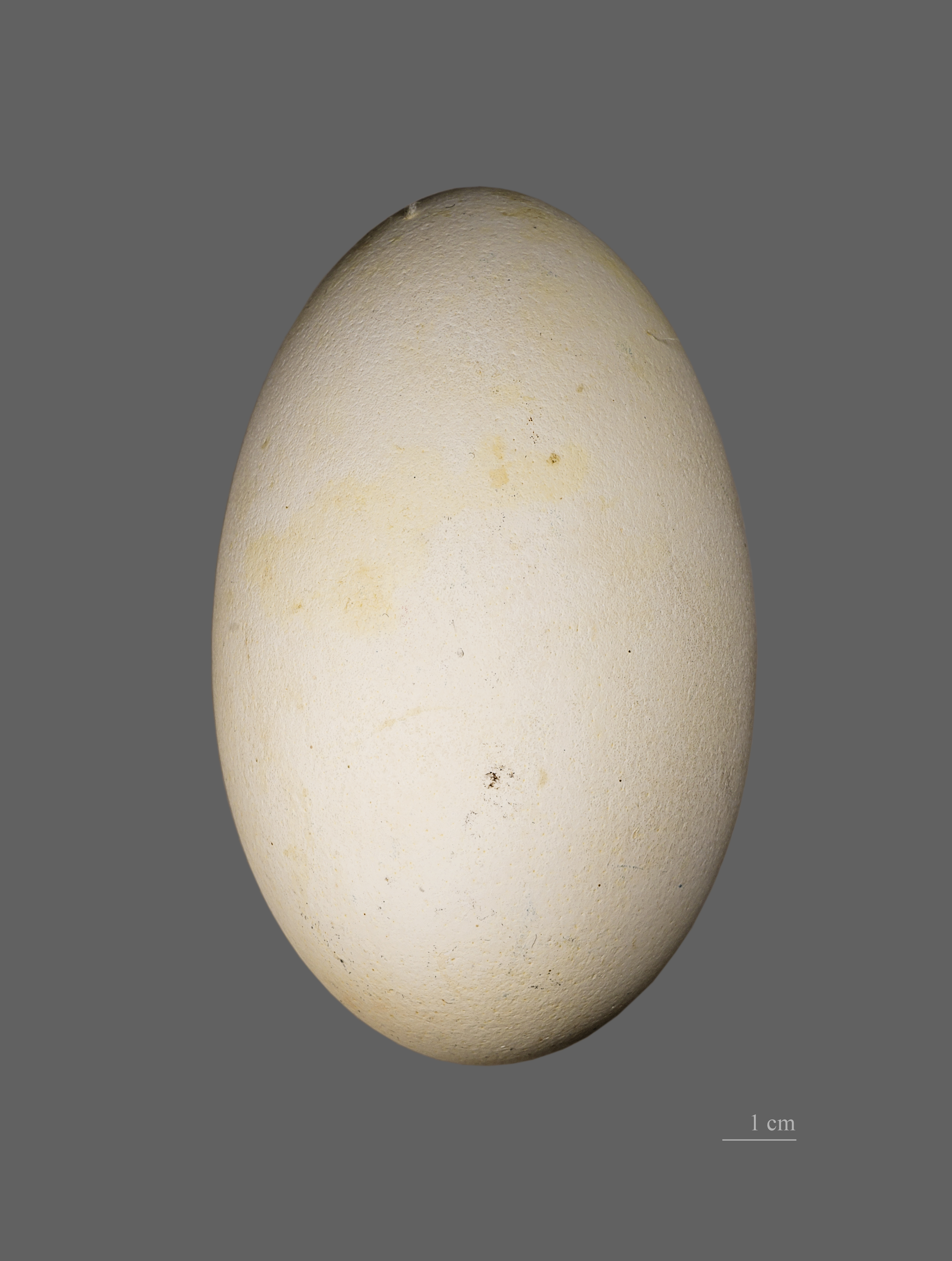
Egg of southern giant petrel

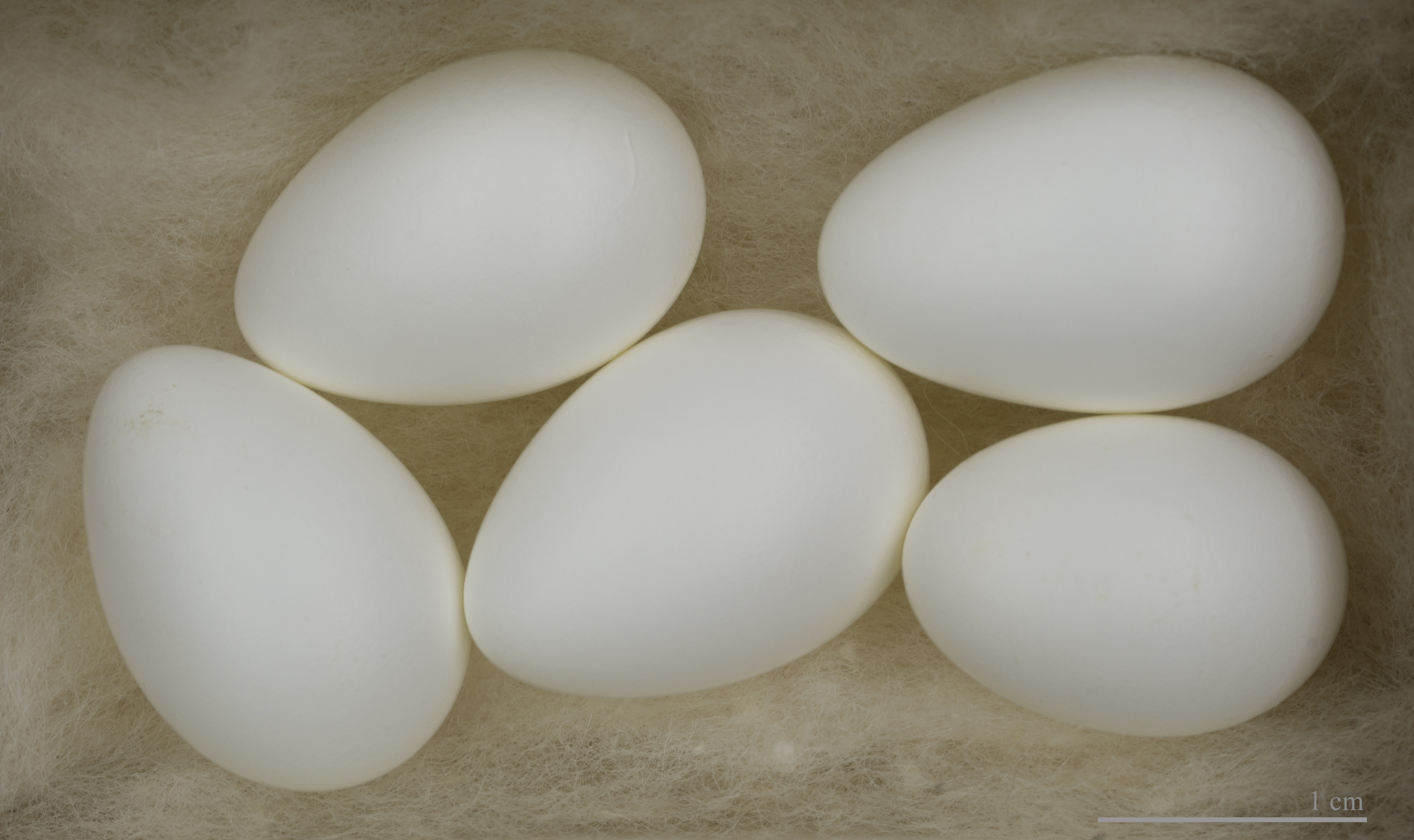
Nest of common house martin

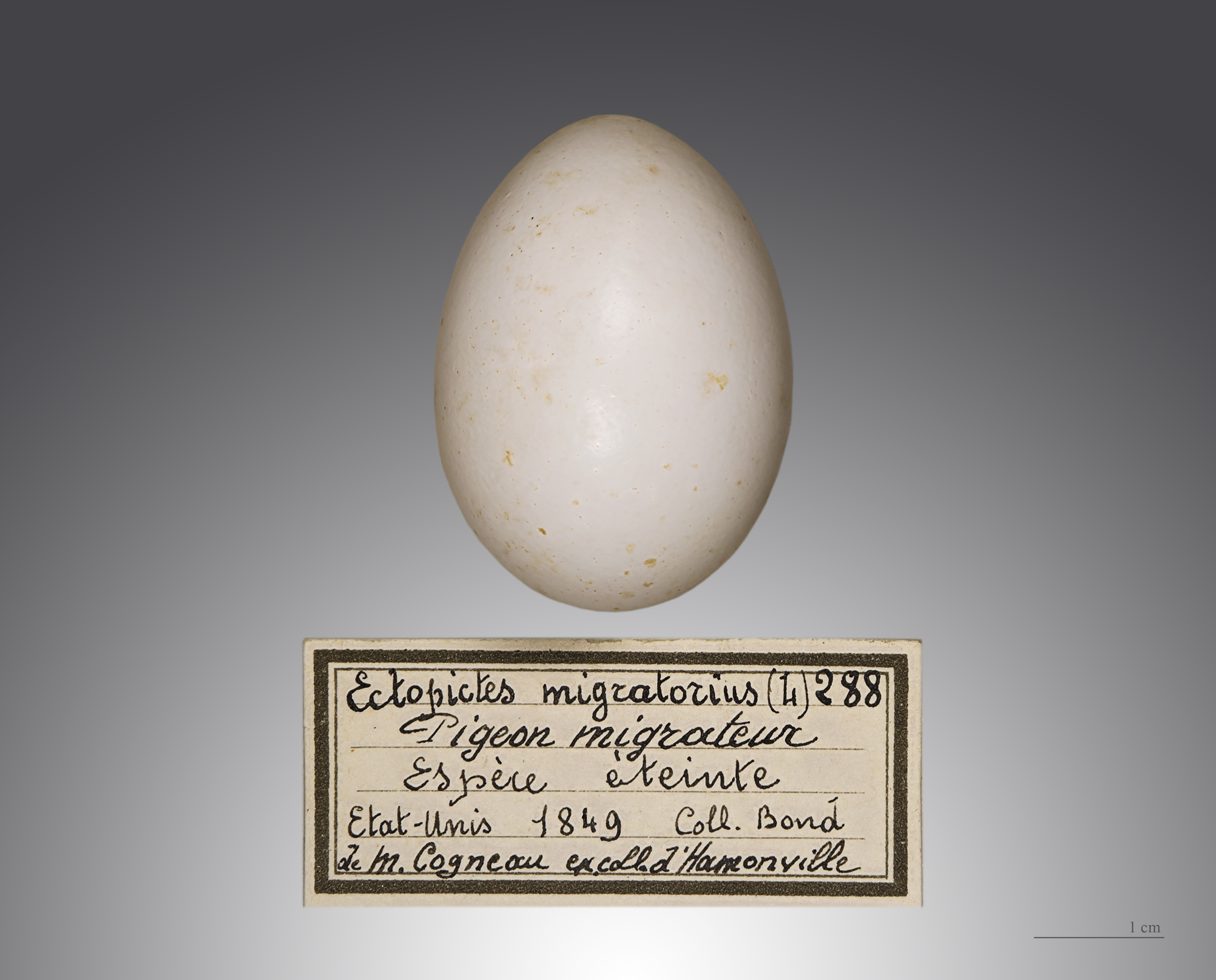
Egg of passenger pigeon

=== Osteology ===
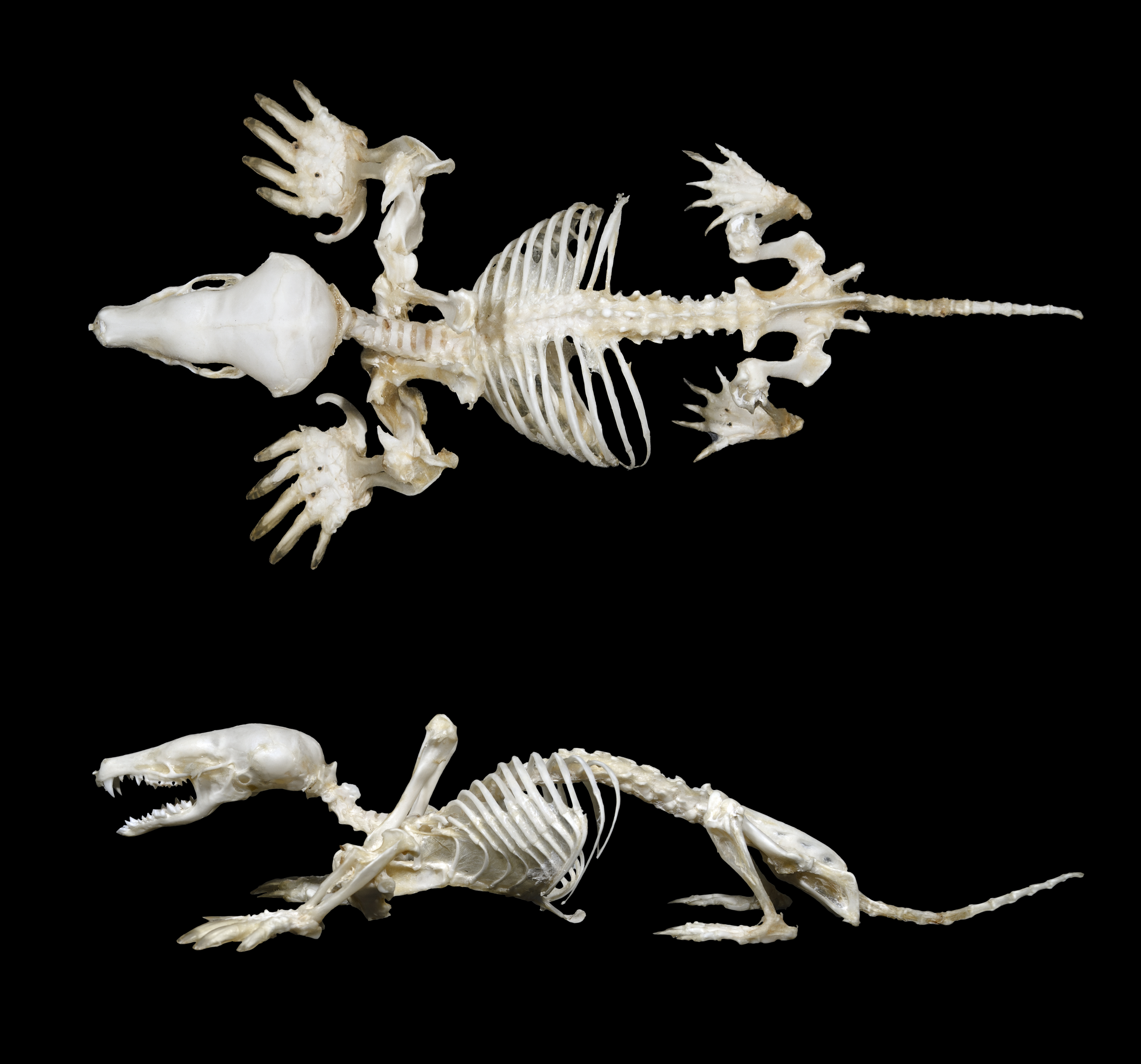
European mole

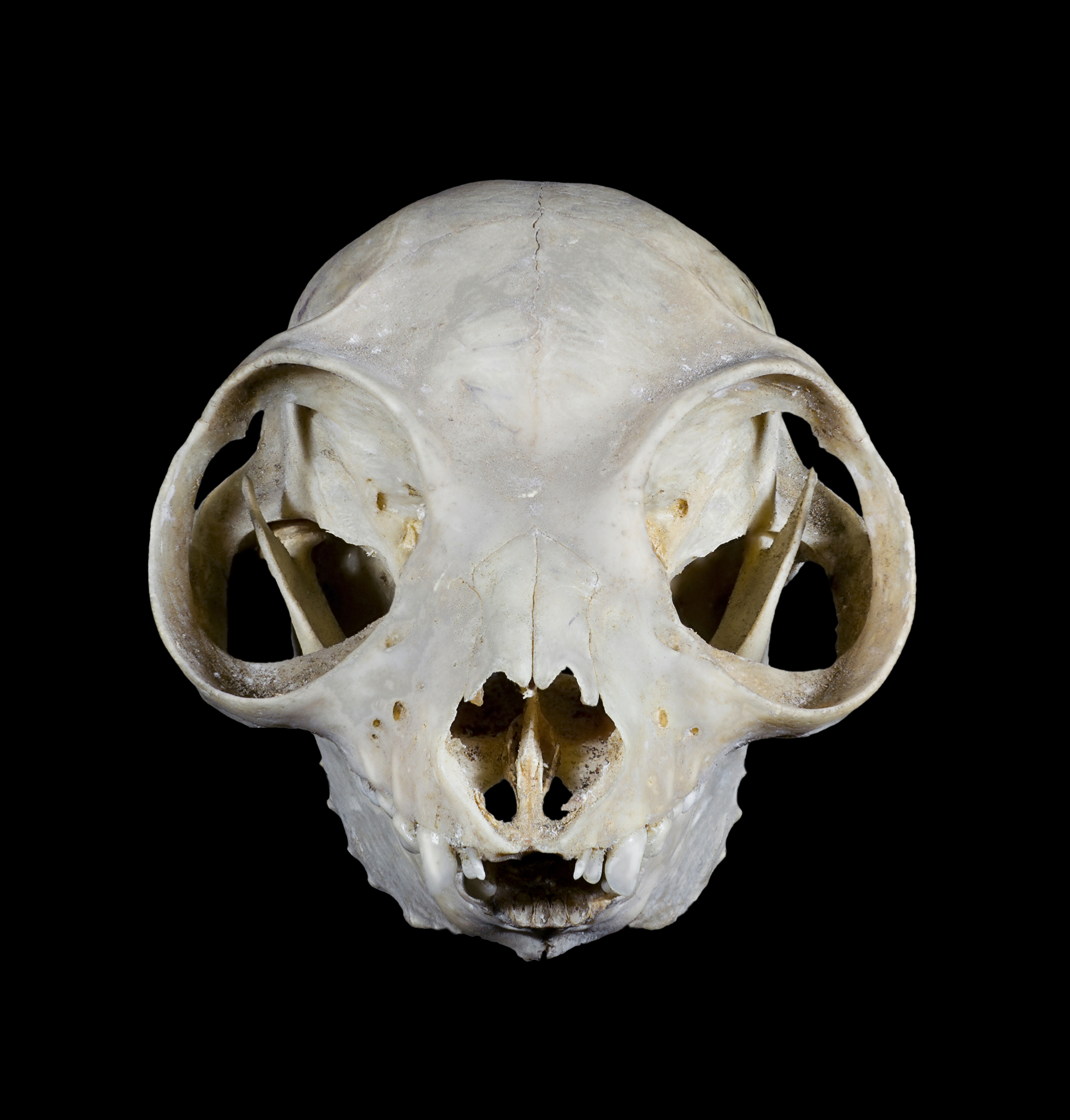
Eastern woolly lemur

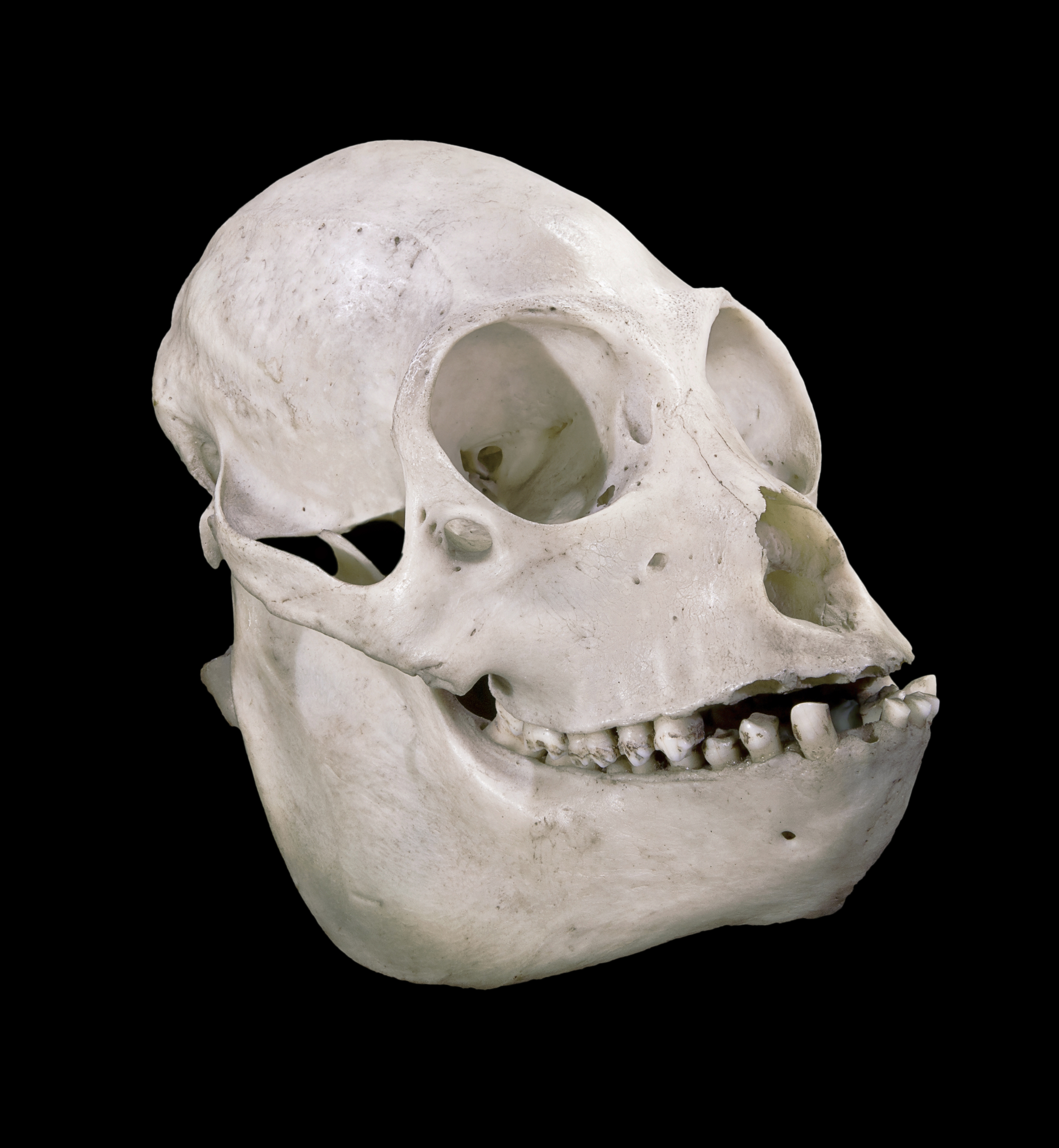
Red howler monkey

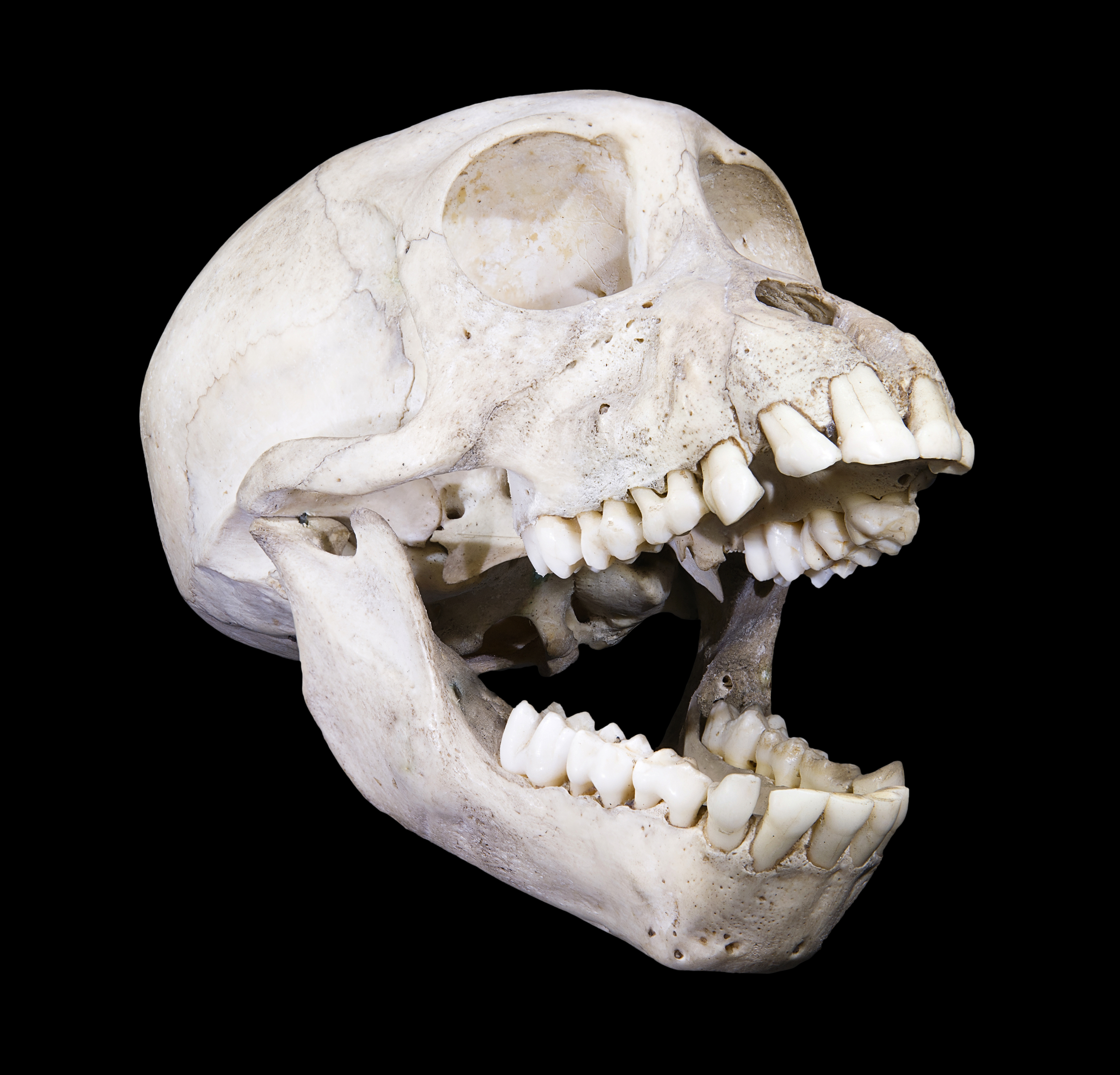
Yellow baboon

=== Paleontology ===
The specimens of the collection of paleontology amount to tens of thousands. They date from the Paleoarchean to the Eocene.

==== Invertebrates ====
The invertebrates room was named Saint-Simon in honor to the collection of the malacologist Alfred de Candie de Saint-Simon, presented during the museum opening exhibit in 1865, under the directorship of Édouard Filhol.

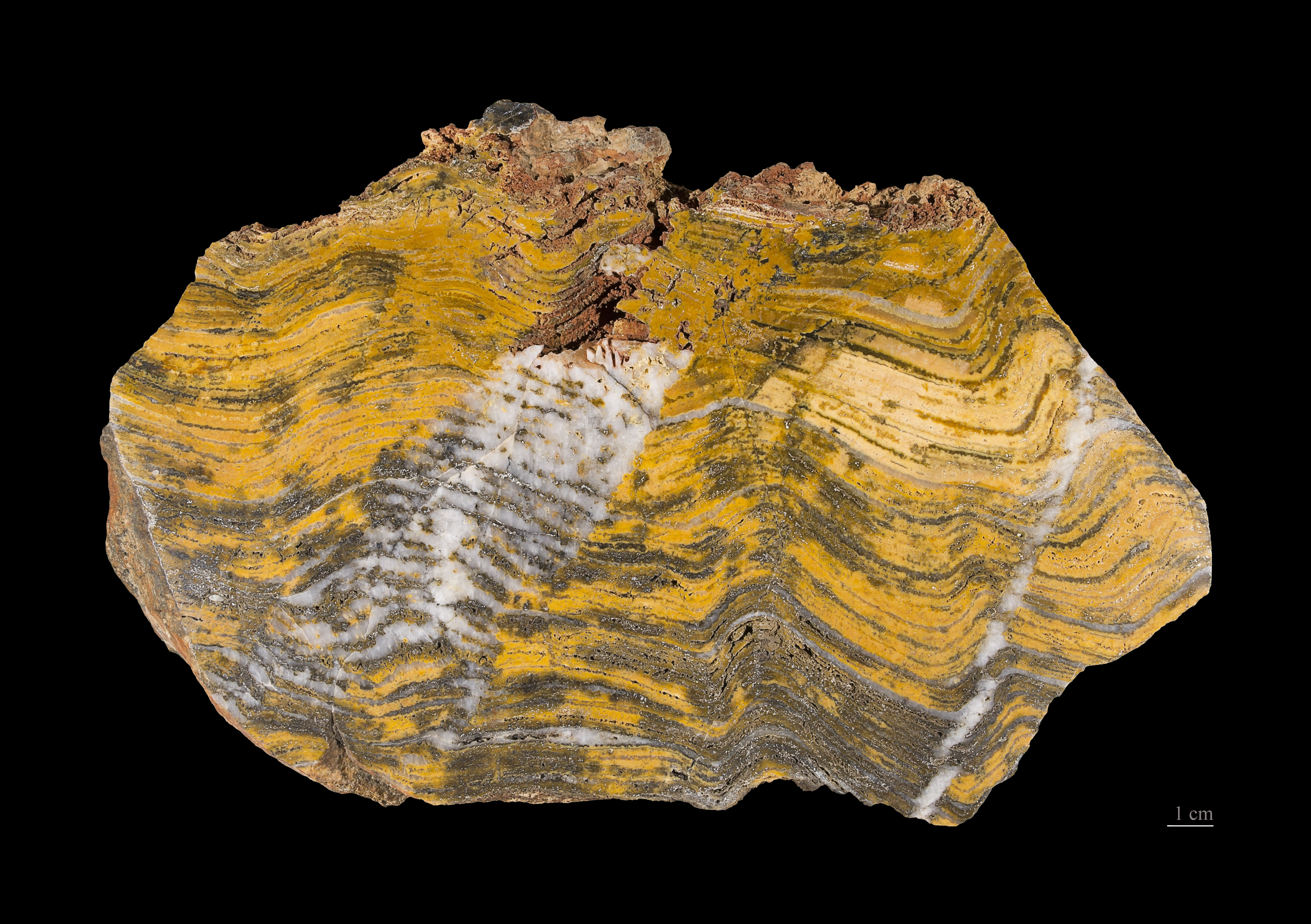
One of the oldest life forms, a Stromatolite of Paleoarchean age – 3, 600 to 3, 200 million years ago (Mya)

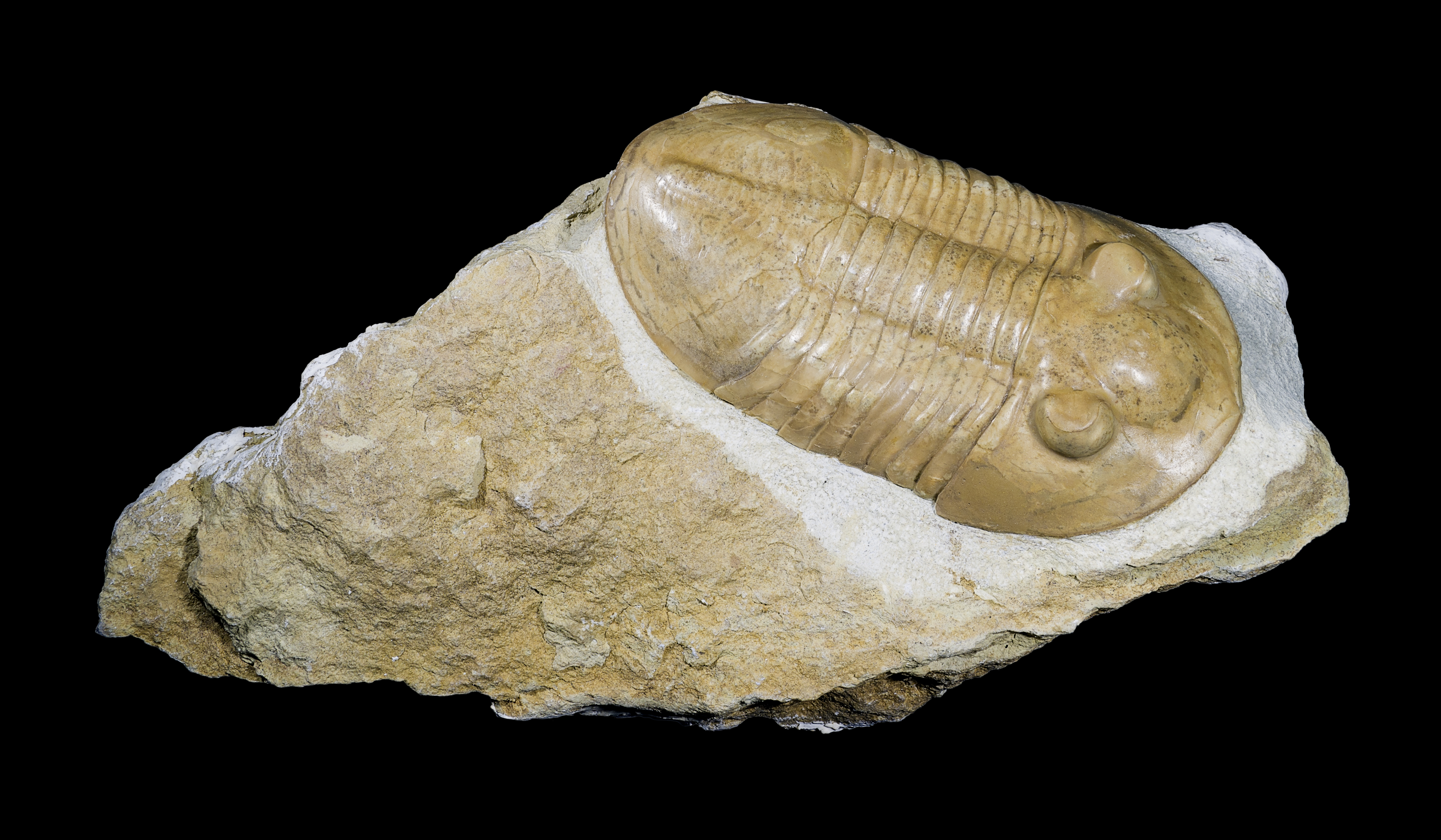
Trilobite of Middle Ordovician – 468 to 460 Mya

==== Vertebrates ====
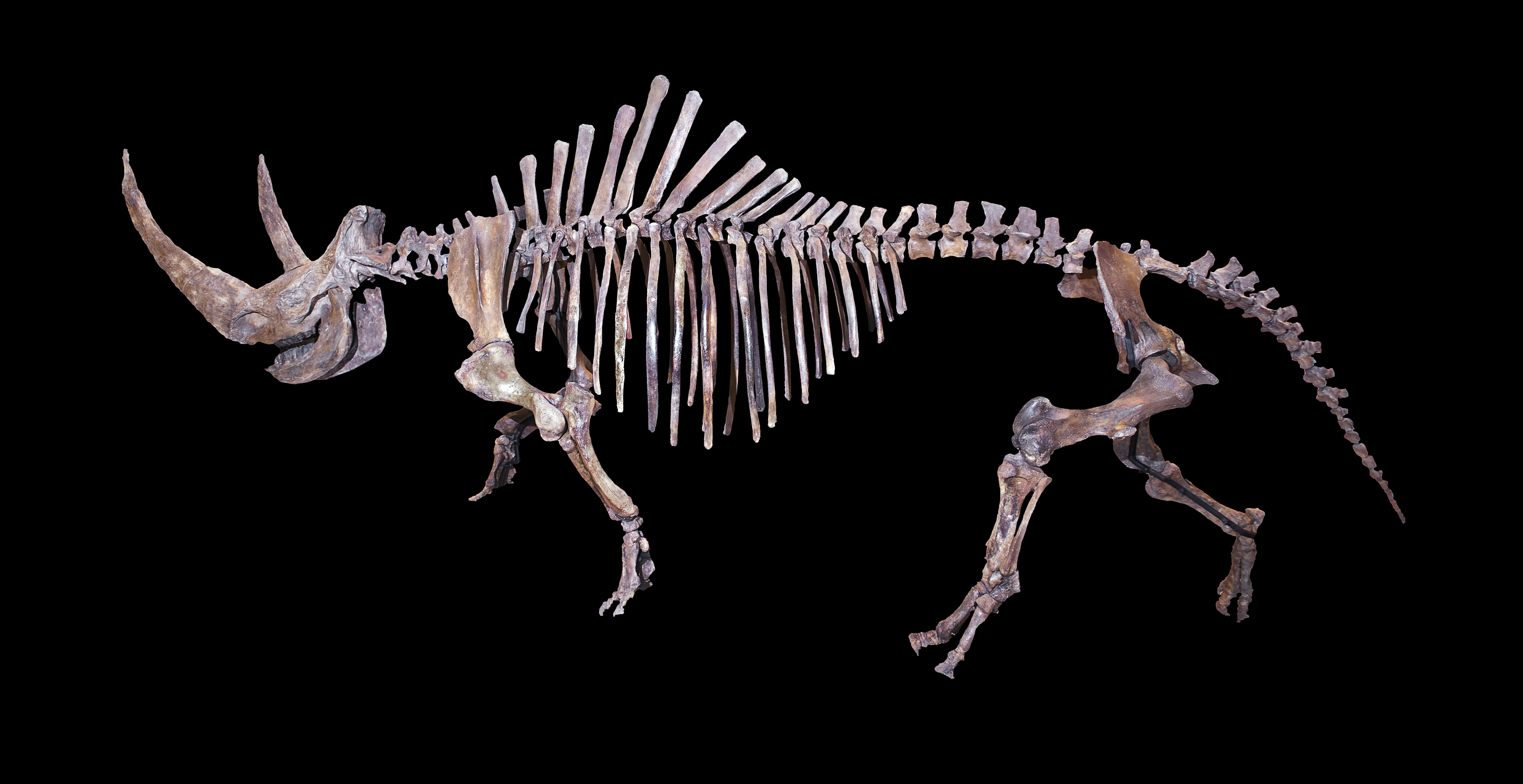
Woolly rhinoceros complete skeleton of Pleistocene age – 370, 000 to 10, 000 years ago

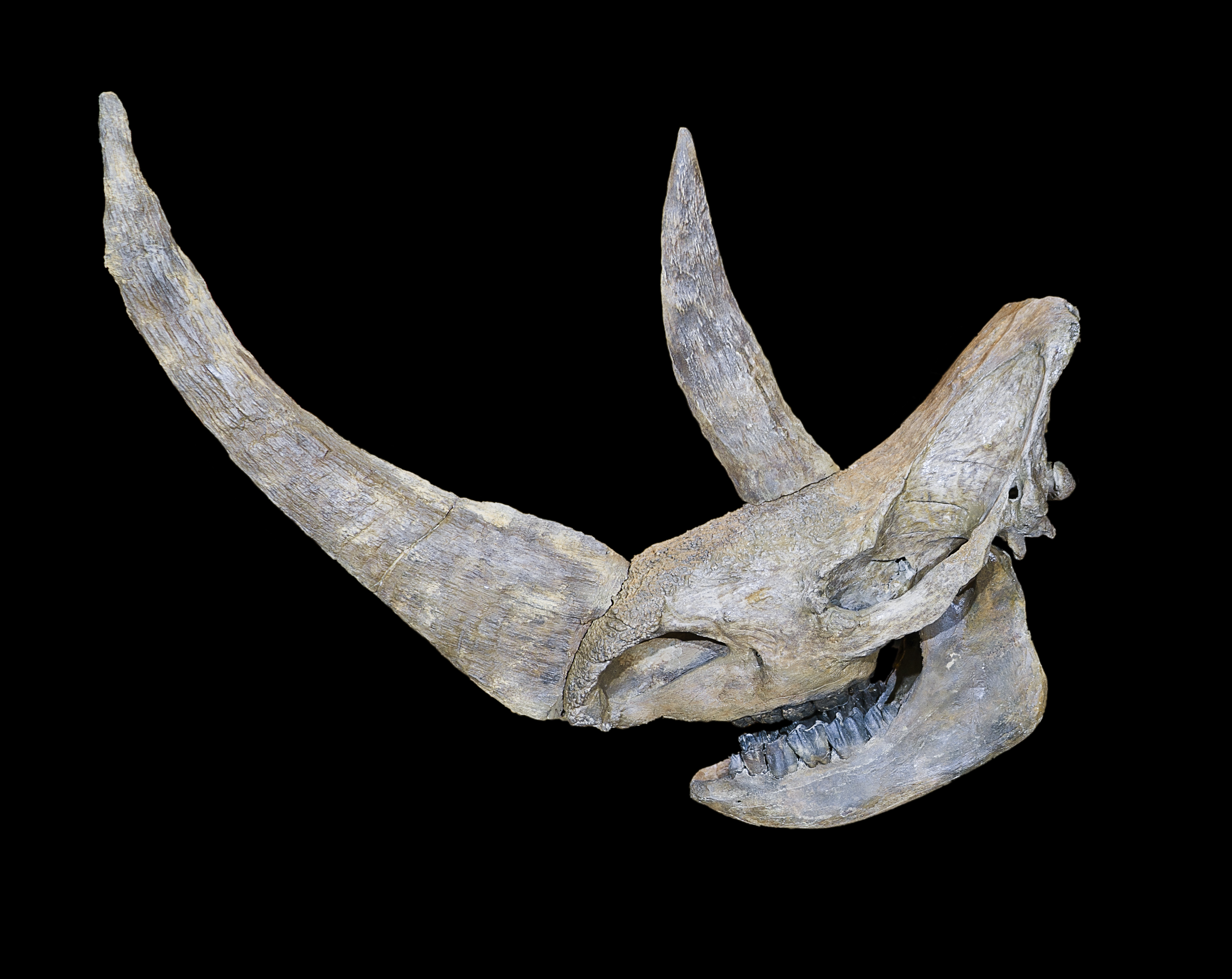
Woolly rhinoceros, complete skull

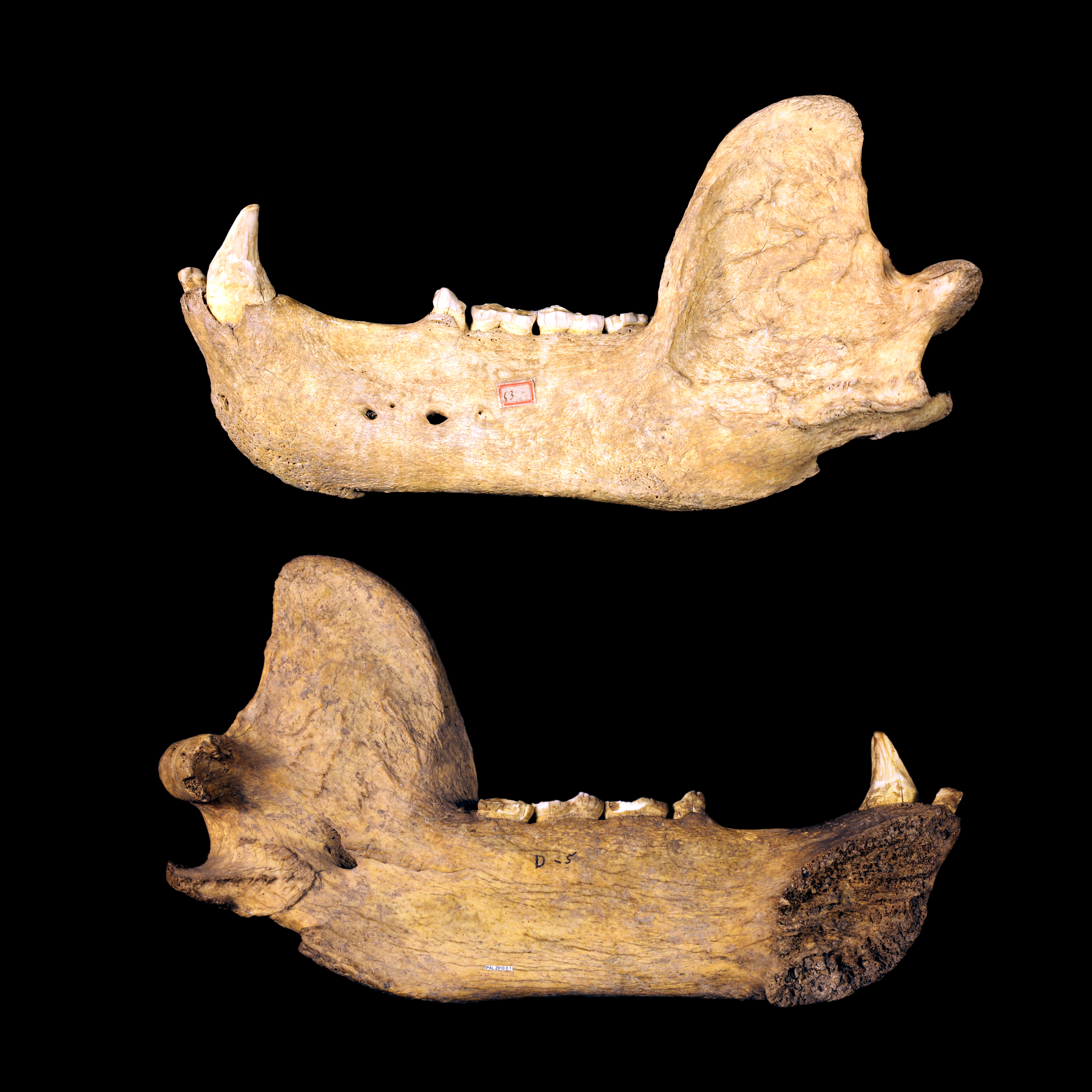
Cave bear mandible of Pleistocene age

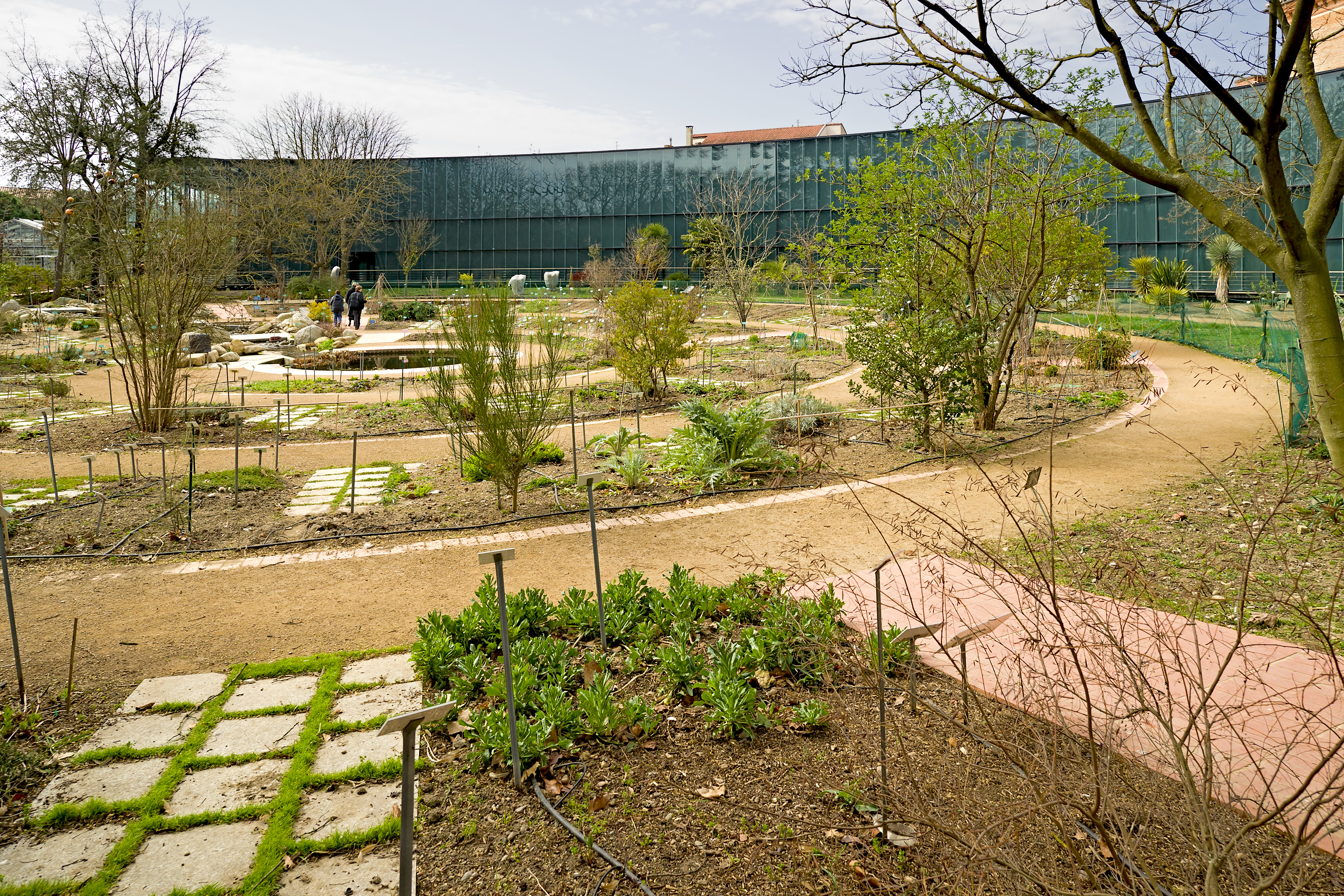
Jardin Henri Gaussen in winter

== Henri Gaussen Botanical Garden ==
Henri Gaussen was a Toulouse-based phytogeographer and botanist. The botanic garden which honours his name is attached to the museum and is part of the Earth and Life Science Research and Training Paul Sabatier University. A second botanical area, The Museum Gardens, extends over 3 hectares. It is notable for "potagers du monde" (vegetable gardens of the world) and a "shade house" which recreates the conditions required by shade plants.
