= Émile Cartailhac =

French prehistorian (1845–1921)

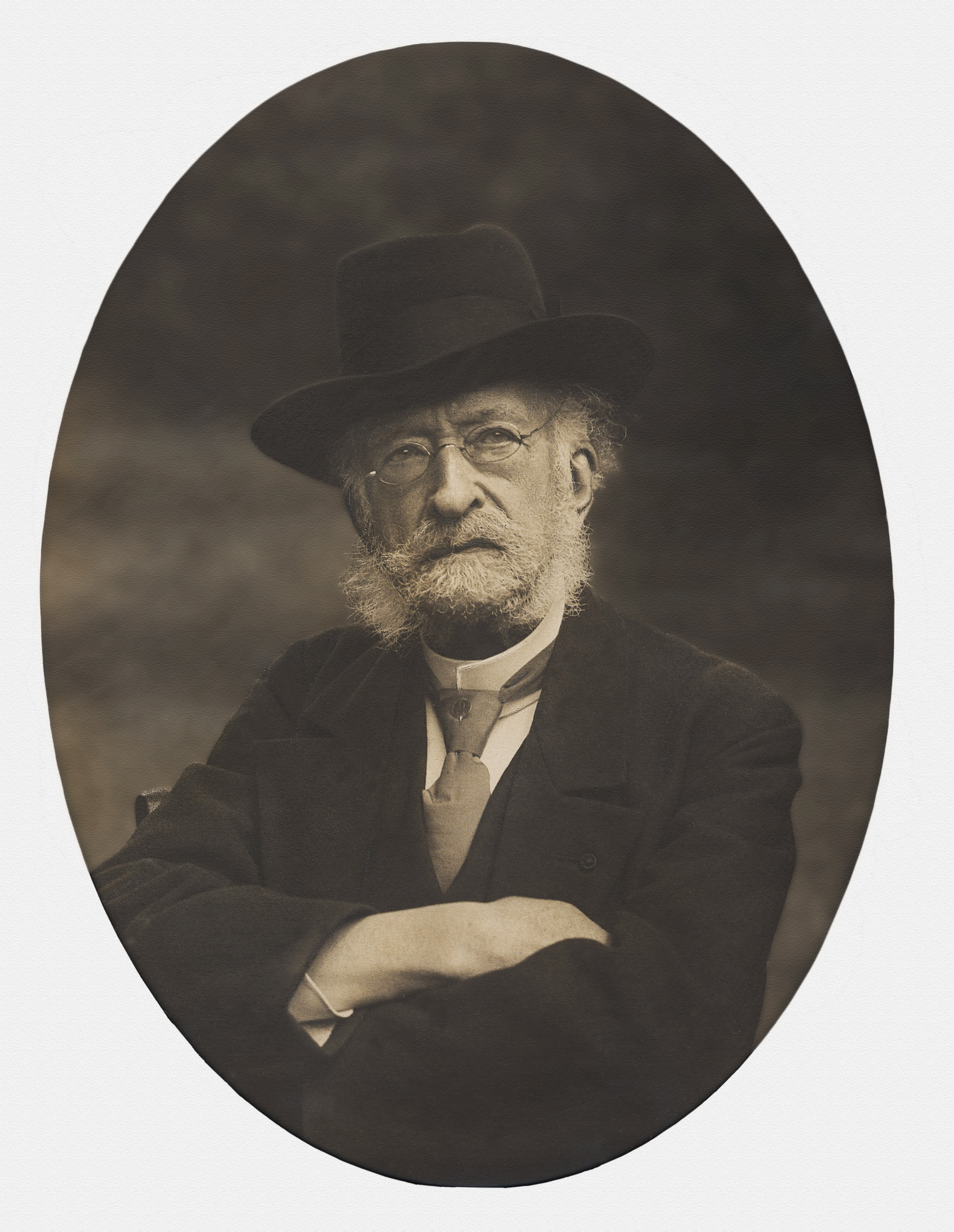
- Émile Cartailhac
- Born: February 15, 1845; Marseille, France
- Died: November 26, 1921 (aged 76); Geneva, Switzerland
- Known for: Studies of cave art Mea culpa d'un sceptique (1902)
- Scientific career
- Fields: Prehistoric art, Archaeology
- Workplaces: University of Toulouse; Institut de paléontologie humaine, Paris

Émile Cartailhac (15 February 1845 – 26 November 1921) was a French prehistorian, sometimes regarded as one of the founding fathers of the studies of the cave art.

Cartailhac is perhaps best remembered because of his involvement with the Altamira paintings, which he originally dismissed as a forgery on the specious grounds that primitive men had no capacity for abstract thought. This ruined the reputation of Altamira's discoverer, Marcelino Sanz de Sautuola, which Cartailhac feebly attempted to restore 14 years after the former's death, once mounting evidence had made the prehistoric authorship of the cave art undeniable.

Cartailhac was born in Marseille. He became interested in prehistory (studies of which were then just beginning) at a very young age. He made excavations around the dolmens in Aveyron, and also in Portugal, Iceland and the Balearic Islands. In 1867, he was the supervisor of the prehistory section at a world's fair in Paris. Two years later, he became the chief editor of the revue Matériaux pour l'histoire naturelle et primitive de l'homme founded by Gabriel de Mortillet. This position he held until 1887. From 1882 he taught at the university in Toulouse and in 1897, he was elected a curator of Académie des Jeux floraux. After changing his opinion about Altamira, he became one of the founders of the studies of the cave art and one of the scientists (together with e. g. Henri Breuil) who recognised its importance. With Breuil he made the initial survey of the Caves of Gargas at Aventignan in the Pyrenees, and where Félix Régnault discovered Gravettian cave art in 1906. He was (together with Breuill and Marcellin Boule) one of the founders of Institut de paléontologie humaine in Paris (following a generous donation from Albert I).

== Cartailhac and Altamira ==
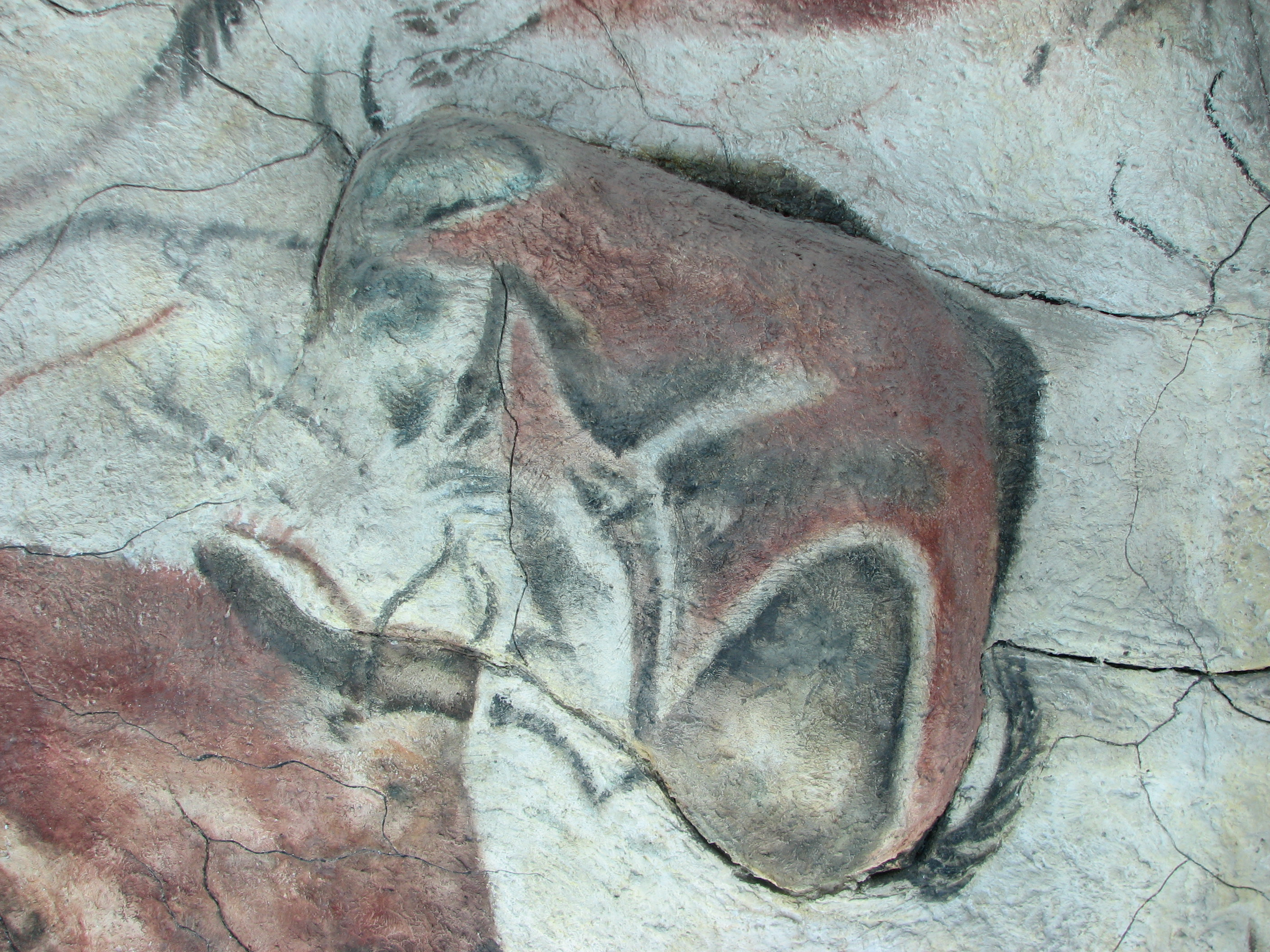
A bison in Altamira

When Marcelino Sanz de Sautuola's daughter María discovered the paintings in Altamira and Sautuola, together with professor Vilanova, published their findings in 1880, Cartailhac was one of the leaders of the scientists who, suddenly facing a revolutionary change in the view of the prehistoric man, ridiculed these paintings at the 1880 Prehistorical Congress in Lisbon. Due to this opinion, the members of the congress did not even visit Altamira. He changed his mind after several other caves with clearly prehistoric paintings had been found and visited the cave with Breuill in 1902. He apologised there to María de Sautuola (her father died in 1888) and promised her to do everything to clear don Marcelino's name (Sautuola had even been accused of forgery). His letter from 9 October 1902 says among other things: "We live in a new world". He also wrote a famous article, Mea culpa d'un sceptique in which he admitted he was deeply wrong, emphasized the importance of Altamira, accused himself of holding back the progress of his science, and harshly criticised himself for doing an injustice to an honest man and rejecting a thing without any investigation. Today, opinions about this article vary. Kleibl praises it as "one of the finest moments of prehistory" and a "brave article, showing no fear of hurting his" [Cartailhac's] "professional credit", while Lewis-Williams writes about it as an opportunist thing used calculatingly for Cartailhac's own benefit when his position was no longer tenable.

Cartailhac died in Geneva, aged 76.

== Works ==
- Cartailhac, Émile; Breuil, Henri (1903), "Les peintures de la grotte d'Altamira à Santillana (Espagne)", Comptes rendus de l'Académie des Inscriptions et Belles-Lettres, vol. 46, pp. 256–264, doi:10.4000/bibnum.709, S2CID 192990651 , also in Compte rendu de l'Académie des Sciences, p. 534. (1903)
- Cartailhac, Émile (24 Jan 1904), "Les peintures préhistoriques de la caverne d'Altamira" (PDF), Conférence faite au Musée Guimet
- Cartailhac H, Émile; Breuil, Henri (1904), "Les peintures et gravures murales des cavernes pyrénéennes. Altamira et Marsoulas" (PDF), L'Anthropologie, 15: 625–644
  - continued in "Les peintures et gravures murales des cavernes pyrénéennes. Altamira et Marsoulas", L'Anthropologie, 16: 431–444, 1905
- Cartailhac, Émile; Breuil, Henri (1906), "La caverne d'Altamira à Santillana, près de Santander (Espagne)", Peintures et gravures murales des cavernes paléolithiques, vol. 1
- Cartailhac, Émile (1902), "La grotte d'Altamira. "Mea culpa" d'un sceptique", L'Anthropologie (XIII): 348–354
- Cartailhac, Émile (1892), Monuments primitifs des Îles Baléares, É. Privat (Toulouse)
- Cartailhac, Émile (1886), Les âges préhistoriques de l'Espagne et du Portugal, C. Reinwald (Paris)
- Cartailhac, Émile (1889), La France préhistorique : d'après les sépultures et les monuments, F. Alcan (Paris)
