= Glozel artifacts =

Collection of artifacts discovered in France

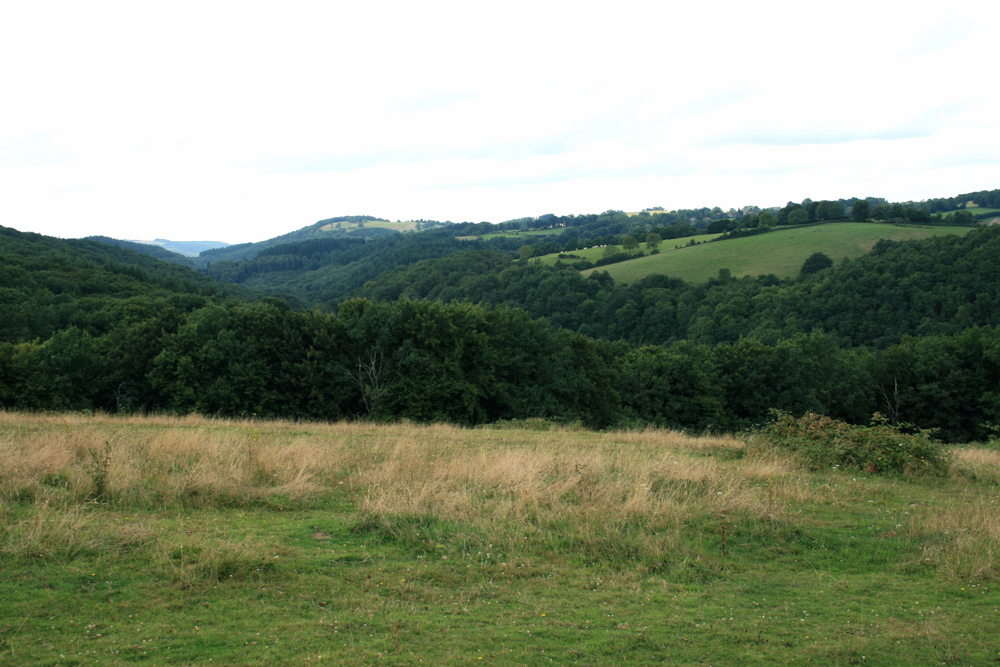
View of the area where Glozel is located

The Glozel artifacts are a collection of over 3,000 artifacts, including forged clay tablets, sculptures and vases, some of which were inscribed, discovered from 1924 to 1930 in the vicinity of French hamlet of Glozel.

Promoted by their discoverers as proof of an advanced prehistoric civilization, the finds initiated a series of claims and counterclaims. The objects were all initially dismissed as a hoax by professional archaeologists. Later research confirmed that some of the items date back to the Iron Age, but it was not before a 1995 study ordered by the French Ministry for Culture that the "prehistoric civilization" thesis was rebutted and the vast majority of the finds dated to the Middle Ages, with significant presence of alterations and forgeries.

== Discovery and excavation ==
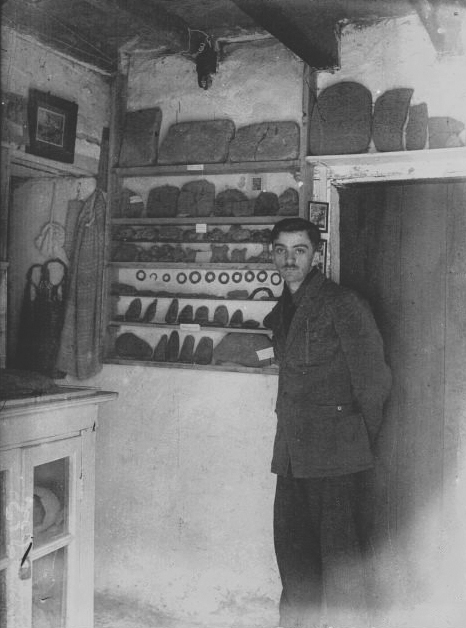
Young Émile Fradin inside his museum

The initial discovery was made on 1 March 1924 by 17-year-old Émile Fradin (born August 8, 1906, died February 10, 2010, age 103) and his grandfather Claude Fradin. Émile was guiding a cow-drawn plow when the cow's foot became stuck in a cavity. Freeing the cow, the Fradins uncovered an underground chamber, with walls of clay bricks and 16 clay floor tiles, containing human bones and ceramic fragments.

Adrienne Picandet, a local teacher, visited the Fradins' farm in March, and afterwards informed the Minister of Education about the site. On July 9, another teacher, Benoit Clément, visited the Fradins representing the Société d'Émulation du Bourbonnais, later returning with a man called Viple. Clément and Viple used pickaxes to break down the chamber's remaining walls, which they took away with them. Later, Viple wrote to Émile Fradin identifying the site as Gallo-Roman, dating to between about A.D. 100–400, and possibly of archeological importance. The January issue of the Bulletin de la Société d'Émulation du Bourbonnais mentioned the finds, intriguing Antonin Morlet, a Vichy physician and amateur archaeologist. Morlet visited the farm on 26 April, offering 200 francs to be allowed to complete the excavation. Morlet began his excavations on 24 May 1925, discovering tablets, idols, bone and flint tools and engraved stones. Morlet identified the site as Neolithic in a report entitled Nouvelle Station Néolithique published in September 1925, with Émile Fradin listed as co-author.

Two other tombs were uncovered in 1927. More excavations were performed in April 1928. After 1941, a new law outlawed private excavations, and the site remained untouched until the Ministry of Culture re-opened excavations in 1983. The full report was never published, but a 13-page summary appeared in 1995. The authors suggest that the site is medieval (roughly A.D. 500–1500), possibly containing some earlier Iron Age objects, but was likely enriched by forgeries. A group of scholars organized by René Germain held an annual colloquium about Glozel in Vichy from 1996 to 2009.

=== Glozel affair and controversy ===
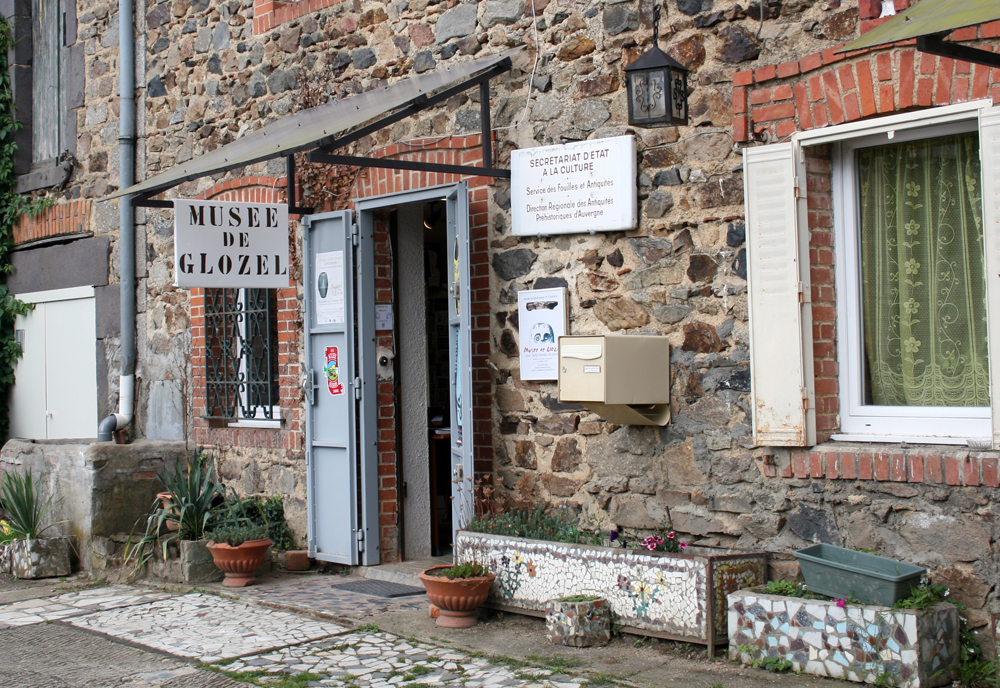
Glozel Museum in 2008

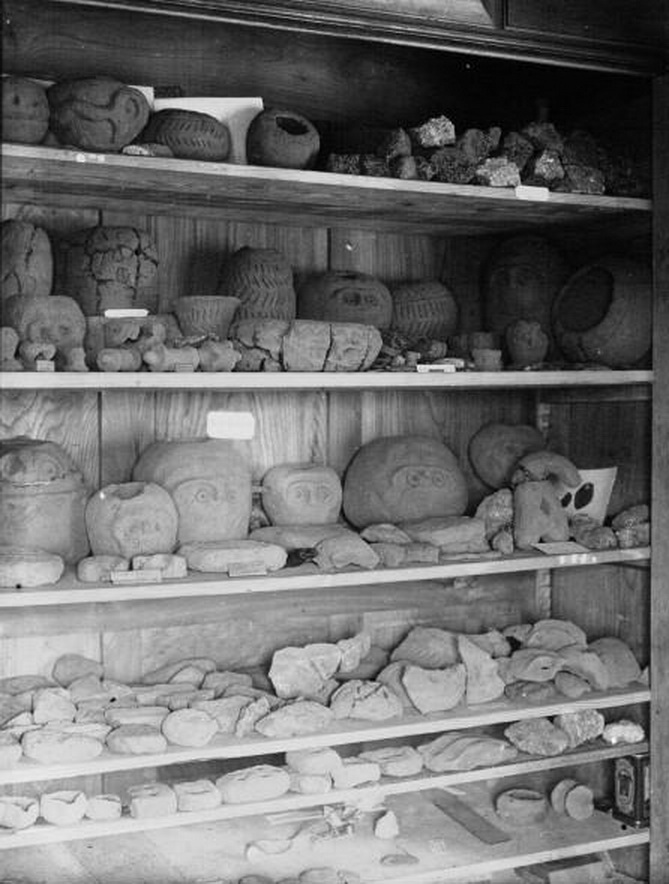
Glozel Museum

French archaeological academia was dismissive of Morlet's 1925 report, published by an amateur and a peasant boy. Morlet invited a number of archaeologists to visit the site during 1926, including Salomon Reinach, curator of the National Museum of Saint-Germain-en-Laye, who spent three days excavating. Reinach confirmed the authenticity of the site in a communication to the Académie des Inscriptions et Belles-Lettres. Similarly, famous archaeologist Abbé Breuil excavated with Morlet and was impressed with the site, but on 2 October, Breuil wrote that "everything is false except the stoneware pottery".

At the meeting of the International Institute of Anthropology in Amsterdam, held in September 1927, Glozel was the subject of heated controversy. A commission was appointed for further investigation, arriving at Glozel on 5 November 1927. During their three-day excavation campaign, the archaeologists were observed by spectators, who were by now flocking to the site, finding various artifacts, but in their report of December 1927, the commission declared everything at Glozel with the exception of a few pieces of flint axes and stone were fake. René Dussaud, curator at the Louvre and famous epigrapher, also accused Émile Fradin of forgery. On 8 January 1928, Fradin filed suit for defamation against Dussaud.

Felix Regnault, the president of the French Prehistoric Society, visited Glozel on 24 February 1928. After briefly visiting the site's small museum, he filed a complaint of fraud. On 25 February, the police, under the direction of Regnault, searched the museum, destroyed glass display cases and confiscated three cases of artifacts. On 28 February the suit against Dussaud was postponed due to Regnault's pending indictment against Fradin. A new group of neutral archaeologists, called the Committee of Studies, was appointed by scholars who were uncomfortable with the ongoing controversy. They concluded that "that the whole of Glozel was a fake".

Excavating from 12 to 14 April 1928, they found more artifacts, and in their report asserted the authenticity of the site, which they identified as Neolithic. Gaston-Edmond Bayle, chief of the Criminal Records Office in Paris, analyzed the confiscated artifacts. Bayle's report identified the artifacts as recent forgeries, and on 4 June 1929, Émile Fradin was indicted for fraud on the basis of Bayle's report. The verdict against Fradin was reverted by an appeal court in April 1931. The defamation charge against Dussaud came to trial in March 1932, and Dussaud was found guilty of defamation.

== Dating the artifacts ==
Glass found at Glozel was dated spectrographically in the 1920s, and again in the 1990s at the SLOWPOKE reactor at the University of Toronto by neutron activation analysis. Both analyses place the glass fragments in the medieval period. Alice and Sam Gerard together with Robert Liris in 1995 managed to have two bone tubes found in Tomb II C-14 dated at the AMS C-14 laboratory at the University of Arizona, finding a 13th-century date.

Thermoluminescence dating (TL) of Glozel pottery in 1974 confirmed that the pottery was not produced recently. By 1979, 39 TL dates on 27 artifacts separated the artifacts into three groups: the first between 300 BC and 300 AD (Celtic and Roman Gaul), the second medieval, centered on the 13th century, and the third recent. TL datings of 1983 performed in Oxford range from the 4th century to the medieval period.

Carbon-14 datings of bone fragments range from the 13th to the 20th century. Three C-14 analyses performed in Oxford in 1984 dated a piece of charcoal to the 11th to 13th century, and a fragment of an ivory ring to the 15th century. A human femur was dated to the 5th century.

== Glozel tablets ==
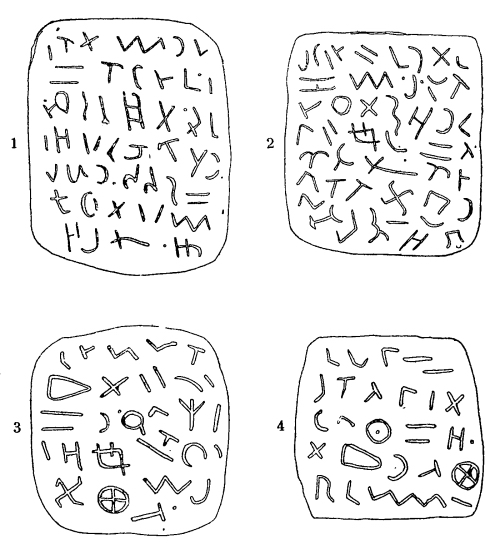
Symbols on some tablets.

Some 100 ceramic tablets bearing inscriptions are among the artefacts found at Glozel. The inscriptions are, on average, six or seven lines, mostly on a single side, although some specimens are inscribed on both faces.

The symbols on the tablets are reminiscent of the Phoenician alphabet, but they have not been conclusively deciphered. There were numerous claims of decipherment, including identification of the language of the inscriptions as Basque, Chaldean, Eteocretan, Hebrew, Iberian, Latin, Berber, Ligurian, Phoenician and Turkic.

== Literature ==
- André Cherpillod, Glozel et l'écriture préhistorique (1991), ISBN 2-906134-15-5
- Émile Fradin, Glozel et ma vie (Les Énigmes de l'univers), R. Laffont (1979), ISBN 2-221-00284-9
- Alice Gerard, Glozel : Bones of Contention (2005), ISBN 0-595-67067-9
- Hans-Rudolf Hitz, Als man noch protokeltisch sprach: Versuch einer Entzifferung der Inschriften von Glozel, Juris (1982), ISBN 3-260-04914-2
- Marie Labarrère-Delorme, La Colombe de Glozel: Propositions pour une lecture des inscriptions de Glozel, M. Labarrère-Delorme (1992) ISBN 2-9504632-1-5
- A Morlet, 'Glozel: Corpus des Inscriptions' (1965) (Montpellier: Causse et Castelnau)
- Nicole Torchet, L'Affaire de Glozel, Copernic (1978), ISBN 2-85984-021-4
- Tom Weston's fictitious novel, The Elf of Luxembourg, tom weston media (2010) ISBN 978-0-981-94133-2, uses the discoveries at Glozel as the basis for his story.
