= Caves of Gargas =

Cave and archaeological site in France

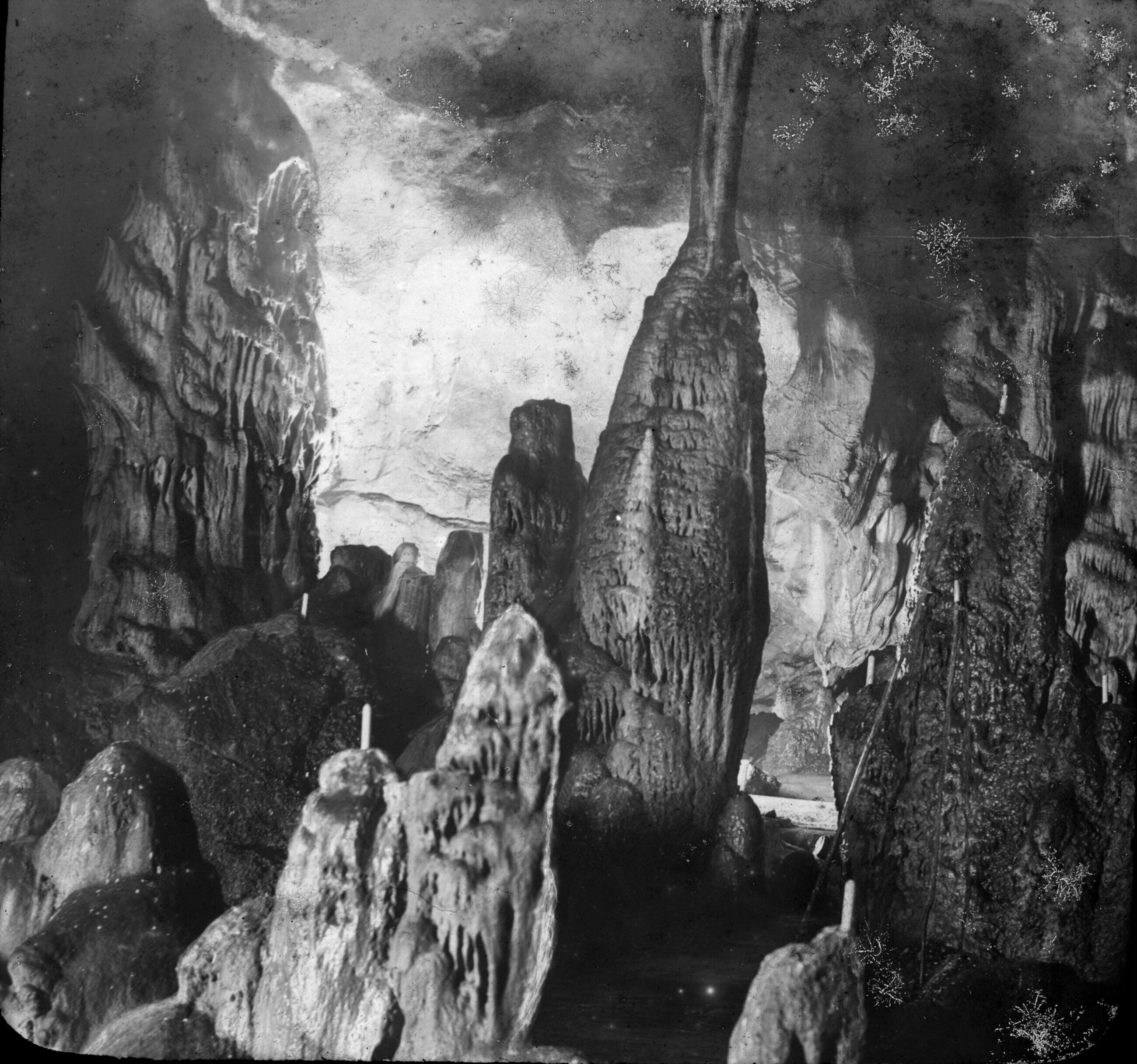
- Interior view taken by Félix Régnault before 1910
- Interactive map of Caves of Gargas
- Location: Aventignan, Hautes-Pyrénées
- Coordinates: 43°03′19″N 00°32′10″E

The Caves of Gargas (French: Grottes de Gargas, French pronunciation: [ɡʁɔt də ɡaʁɡas]) in the Pyrenees region of France are known for their cave art from the Upper Paleolithic period - about 27,000 years old.

The caves are open to the public.

== Location ==
The caves are located near the town of Aventignan in the Hautes-Pyrénées department in south-western France, at the edge of the Haute-Garonne close to Saint-Bertrand-de-Comminges.

== History ==
=== Human occupation ===
The caves have yielded evidence of occupation (bones, lithics (stone tools) and portable art) from the Mousterian to the Middle Ages, but it is most famous for its paintings and engravings of the Upper Paleolithic.

The paintings have numerous negative hand stencils made by the stencil technique. The hands are red (ochre) or black (manganese oxide), using a mixture of iron oxide and manganese crushed with animal fat, and sprayed around the hand against the wall. Some have one or more fingers absent which leads to hypotheses of diseases, frostbite and ritual amputation, but most researchers prefer the symbolism of bending one or more fingers.

Many figurative engravings are also present in other parts of the caves, depicting horses, bison, aurochs, ibex and mammoth. Carbon-14 dating of a bone stuck in a crack in a wall decorated with hand stencils revealed close to 27,000 years BP, indicating that the cave was frequented in the Gravettian period. It is surmised that the Hands paintings probably date from this period.

== Discovery ==
The two chambers of the caves began to be scientifically explored and documented at the end of the 19th century by Émile Cartailhac and Abbé Henri Breuil, but it was Felix Regnault who discovered the hand-print images in 1906.

== Tourism ==
The caves have been classified since 1910 by the French Ministry of Culture as a monument historique (historic monument), Schedule 2, and are open to the public.

== Gallery ==
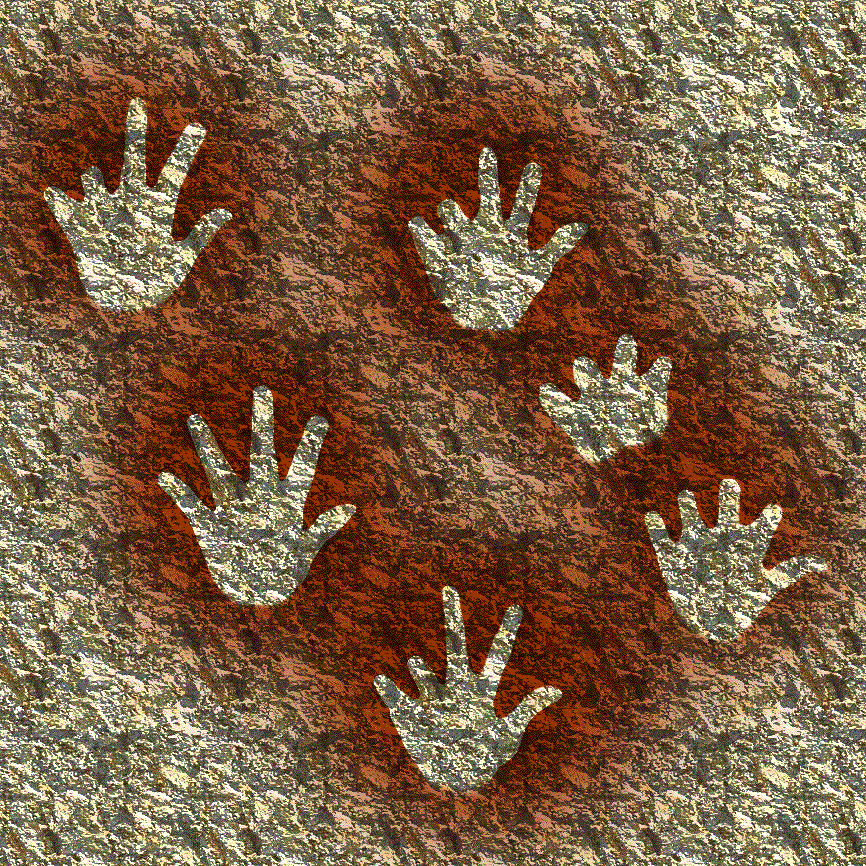
A digital art representation of Negative hand stencils made by the stencil technique

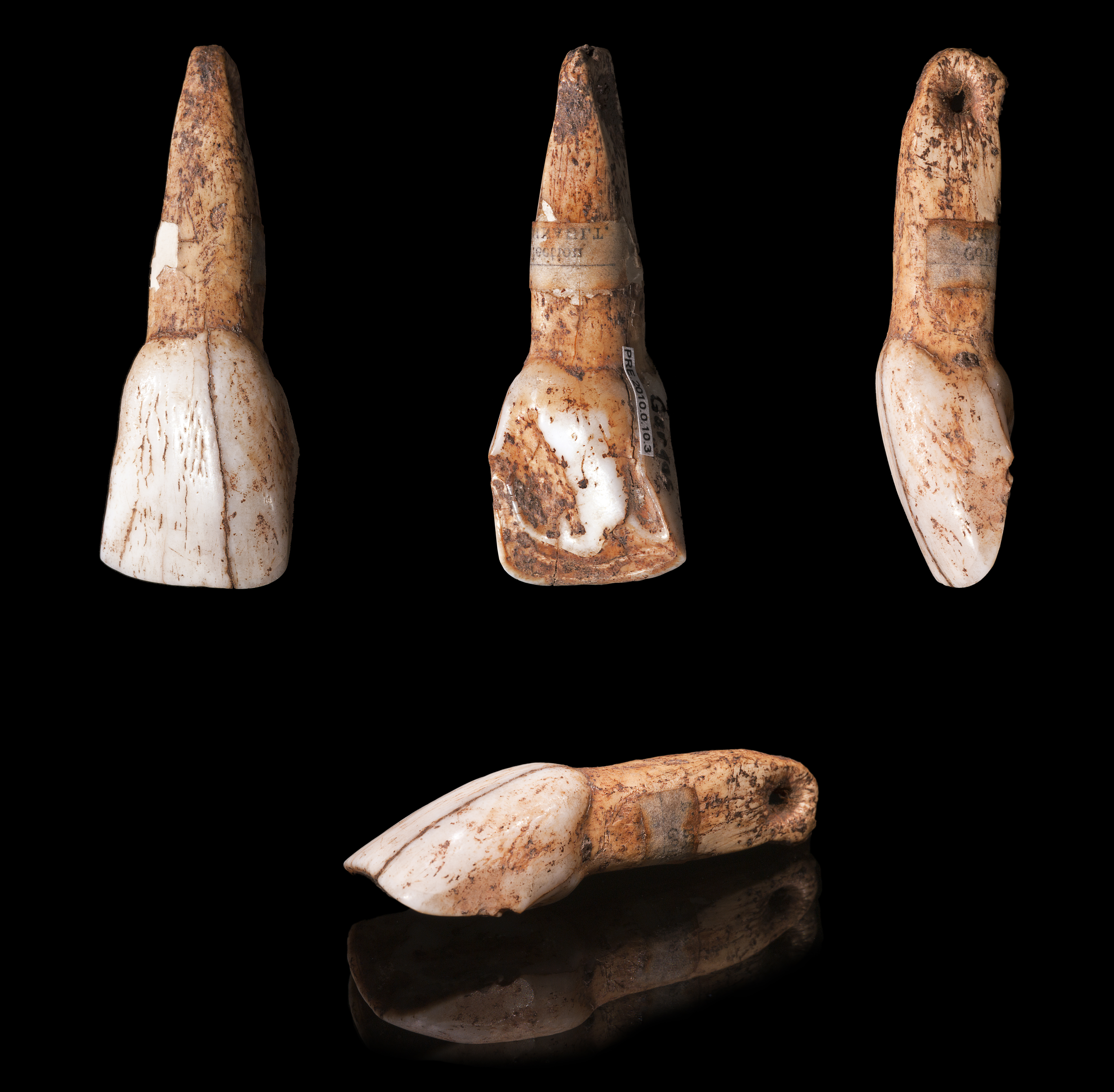
Perforated bovid Incisor – Gravettian Muséum de Toulouse

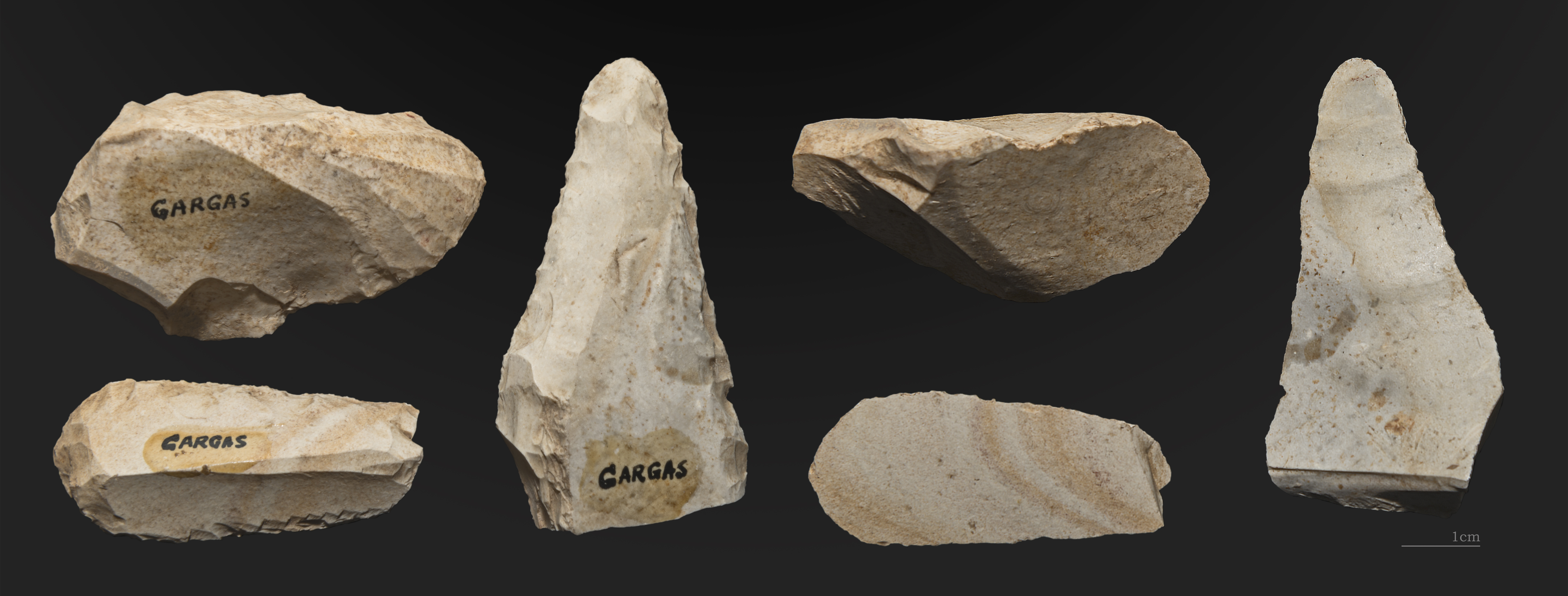
Lithic industry– Gravettian Muséum de Toulouse

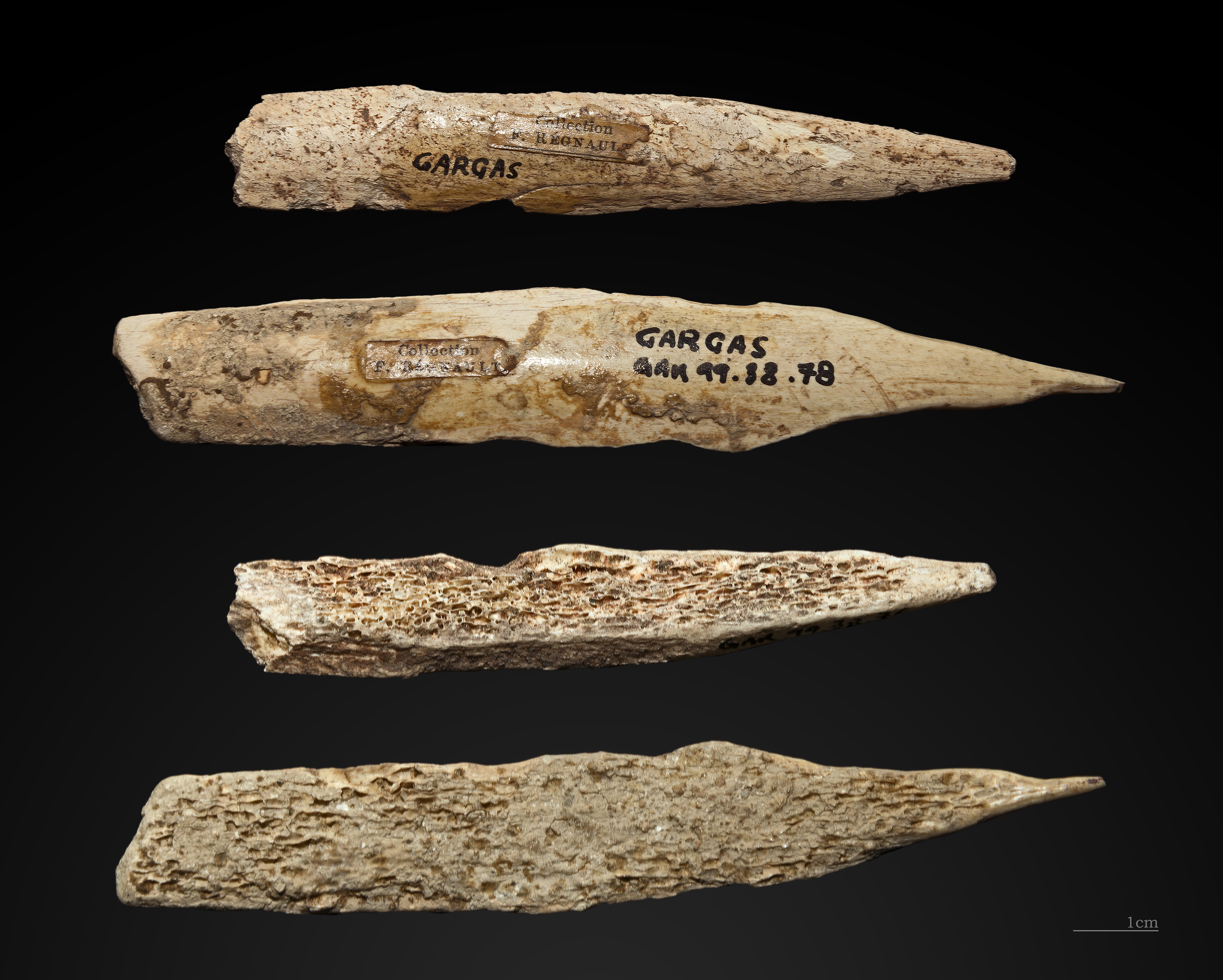
Awl made on abraded bone Gravettian Muséum de Toulouse

== See also ==
- Prehistoric art
- List of archaeological sites by country
- List of caves
- Cave painting
