= Jean-Baptiste Rames =

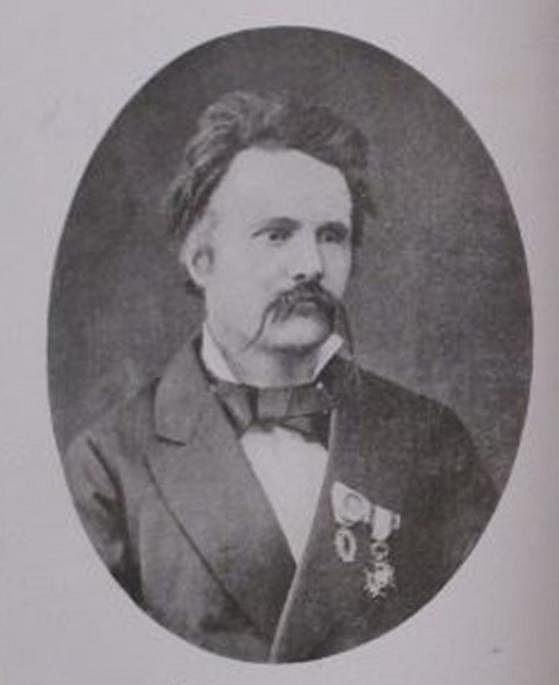
c. 1884

Jean-Baptiste Rames (26 December 1832 – 22 August 1894) was a French pharmacist, naturalist, and geologist who worked on the geology of Cantal and produced a geological map that was exhibited at the Paris Universal Exhibition in 1878.

Map of the Cantal Department produced by Rames (1878)

Rames was born in Aurillac, son of a pharmacist. He studied at the town school before training under the botanist Henri Lecoq. He then studied the natural sciences, geology, and chemistry in Toulouse and explored the Cantal mountains. He followed the ideas of Jean-Étienne Guettard who proposed that the Cantal mountains were the remnants of a single large volcano. In 1869 he published a book that supported evolutionary theory, La création, d’après la géologie et la philosophie naturelle and in 1873 he published Géogenie du Cantal. A relief map of the region that he produced was exhibited at the Paris Universal Exhibition of 1878. He collaborated with Gaston de Saporta and Ferdinand Fouqué. He discovered flints at Puy Courny which triggered debate on the presence of ancestral humans in the Miocene (and even a species Homosimius ramesii was proposed by Gabriel de Mortillet). He was made officer of the Legion of Honour in 1886. After his death, his collections became part of the Rames Museum at Aurillac established in 1902 which was then moved to Château Saint-Étienne as the volcano museum.
