= Chellian =

Term in geology and archeology

In geology, and archeology, Chellian or Chellean was the name given by the French anthropologist G. de Mortillet to the first epoch of the Quaternary period when the earliest human remains were discovered. The word is derived from the French town Chelles in the department of Seine-et-Marne.

== Fauna and flora ==
The climate of the Chellian epoch was warm and humid as evidenced by the wild growth of fig trees and laurels. The animals characteristic of the epoch are the Elephas antiquus, the Rhinoceros, the cave bear, the striped hyaena and the hippopotamus: Louis Lartet indeed called it the Hippopotamus Period.

== Early man ==
Man existed and belonged to the Neanderthal type, or a predecessor hominid. The implements characteristic of the period are hand-held flints chipped into leaf-shaped forms, but are now normally known as Acheulean.

== Cognate geologies ==
The drift-beds of St Acheul (Amiens), of Menchecourt (Abbeville), of Hoxne (Suffolk), and the detrital laterite of Madras are considered by de Mortillet to be synchronous with the Chellian beds.

== See also ==
- Abbevillian
- Oldowan
- Lower Palaeolithic
- Stone Age
- Stone tools
