= National Museum and Research Center of Altamira =

Museum in Santillana del Mar, Spain

- Museo Nacional y Centro de Investigación de Altamira
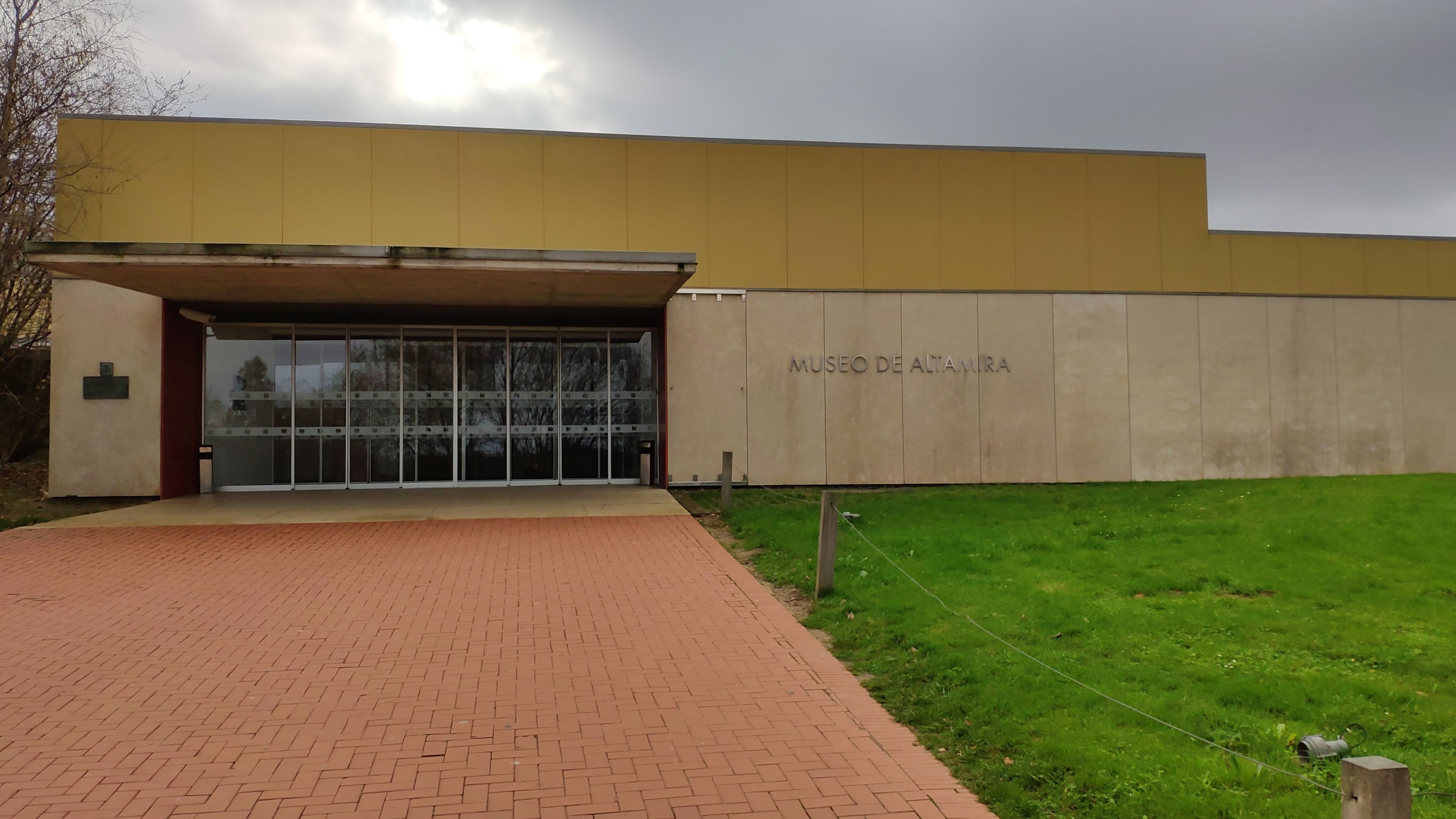
- Museum Entrance
- Established: July 17, 2001
- Location: Santillana del Mar (Cantabria), Spain
- Coordinates: 43.3774°N 4.1225°W
- Key holdings: Neocave, a reproduction of the Cave of Altamira
- Collections: See collections
- Visitors: 287 929 (2017)
- Architect: Juan Navarro Baldeweg
- Website: museodealtamira.mcu.es

The National Museum and Research Center of Altamira (Spanish: Museo Nacional y Centro de Investigación de Altamira), also known as Altamira Museum (Spanish: Museo de Altamira), is a center dedicated to the conservation of, research into, and the sharing of information about the cave of Altamira in Santillana del Mar (Cantabria), Spain, named a World Heritage Site by Unesco. It is one of the National Museums of Spain and it is attached to the Ministry of Culture.

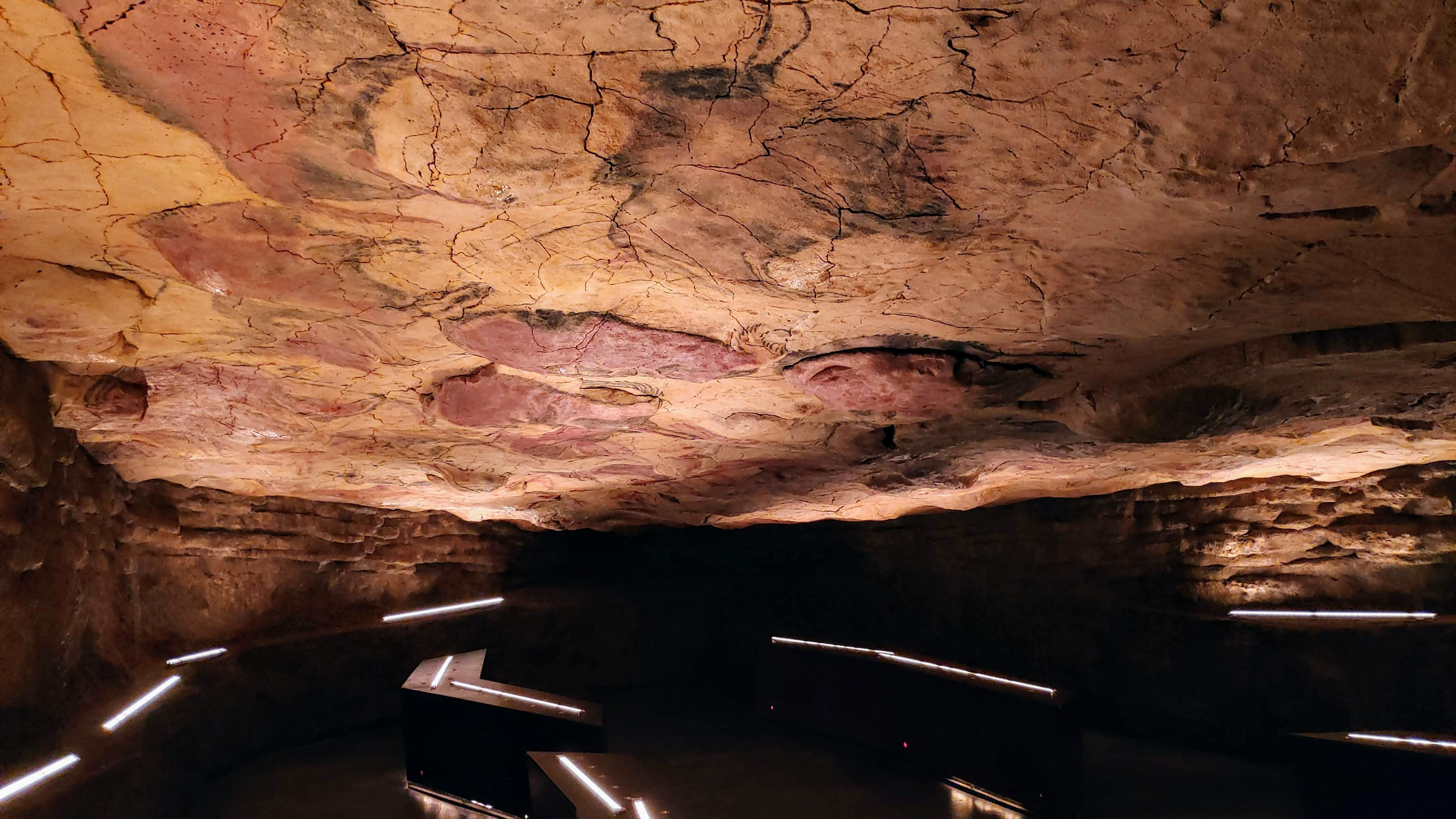
The Neocave, inside the museum

The museum offers prehistoric technology workshops to visitors, as well as a permanent exhibition called Times of Altamira, which contains objects from Altamira as well as those from other palaeolithic caves of Cantabria such as El Morín, El Juyo and El Rascaño. The New Altamira Cave, or Neocave, is also part of this exhibition: an artificial replica of the original caves, built in order to preserve the originals from damage arising from a massive influx of visitors.

== History ==
The vast number of people that wanted to see the cave and the long wait list to do it (more than a year) brought into the table the possibility and necessity of creating a replica. In 2001, the Museum, designed by architect Juan Navarro Baldeweg was erected. The most notable piece in the museum collection is the Neocave. There was already a small replica in Madrid at the National Archaeology Museum, but the Altamira Museum has the most faithful representation of the 15000 year old original cave. In its interior one can see a reproduction of the famous paintings from the cave's ceiling, made by Pedro Saura and Matilde Múzquiz, professors of photography and drawing in the Faculty of Fine Arts of the Complutense University of Madrid, respectively. In this reproduction, the same painting techniques used by painters in the Paleolithic were used. The reproduction was so deeply planned and studied that, during the study of the originals, new paintings and engravings were discovered.

It is a National Museum of Spain, subscribed to the Ministry of Education, Culture and Sports, managed by the General direction of Fine Arts.

== Collections ==
Various collections are custodied and displayed, from discoveries in the Cave of Altamira and others nearby, such as:

- Cave of Altamira (Santillana del Mar, Cantabria).
- Surroundings of Altamira (Santillana del Mar, Cantabria).
- Archeological site of Cuchía (Cuchía, Miengo, Cantabria).
- Cave of El Castillo (Puente Viesgo, Cantabria).
- Cave of El Morín (Villanueva de Villaescusa, Cantabria).
- Cave of El Rascaño (Mirones, Miera, Cantabria).
- Cave of El Salitre (Ajanedo, Miera, Cantabria).
- Cave of Chufín (Riclones, Cantabria).
- Cave of Juyo (Igollo de Camargo, Cantabria).
- Cave of La Pila (Cuchía, Miengo, Cantabria).
- Cave of Las Estalactitas (Santillana del Mar, Cantabria).
- Other outdoor paleolithic sites.

== See also ==
- List of museums in Spain
