= Marcelino Sanz de Sautuola =

Spanish archaeologist (1831–1888)

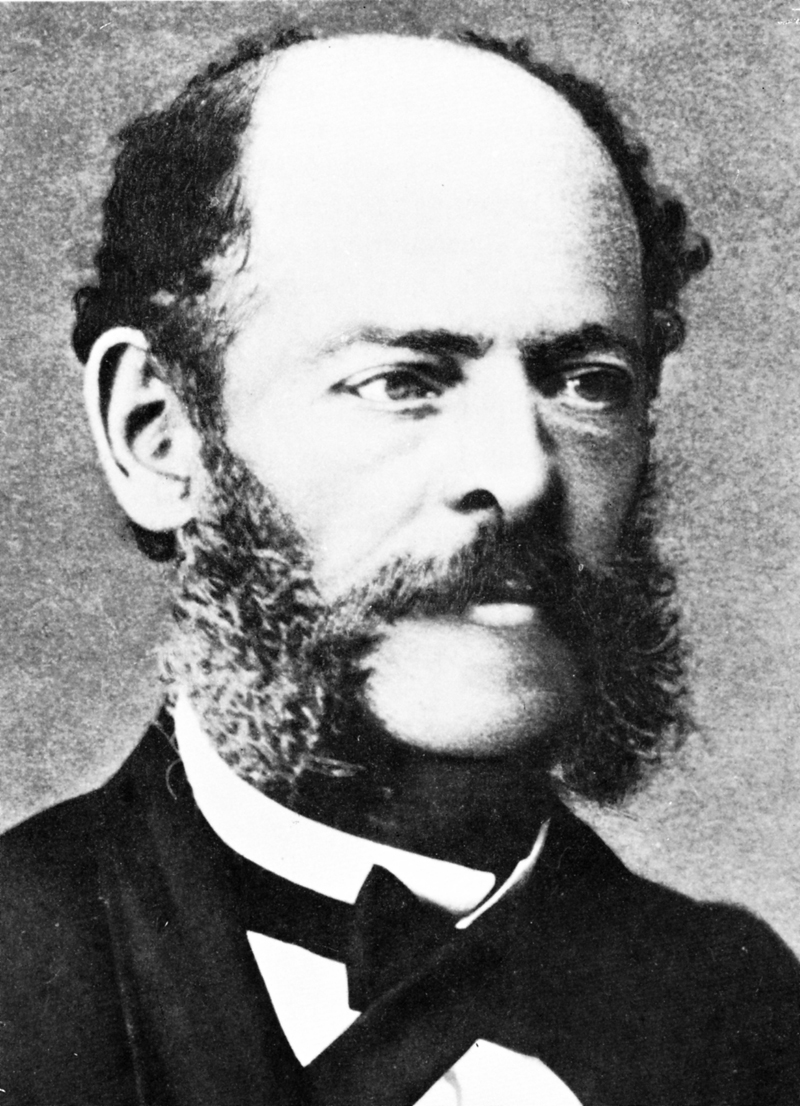
- Born: Marcelino Sanz de Sautuola y Pedrueca; 2 June 1831; Santander
- Died: 2 June 1888 (aged 57); Santander
- Known for: Discoverer and researcher of Altamira
- Children: María (1871-1946)
- Scientific career
- Fields: Prehistorian and archaeologist

Notes
- Did not live to see the worldwide recognition of his great discovery.

Don Marcelino Sanz de Sautuola y Pedrueca or Marcelino de Sautuola (1831-1888) was a Spanish jurist and amateur archaeologist who owned the land where the Altamira cave was found.

== Altamira cave ==
The Altamira cave, now famous for its unique collection of prehistoric art, was well known to local people, but had not been given much attention until 1868, when it was "discovered" by the hunter Modesto Cubillas Pérez.

Sautuola started exploring the caves in 1875. He did not become aware of the paintings until 1879, when his eight-year-old daughter María noticed that the ceiling was covered with images of bison. Sautuola, having seen similar images engraved on Paleolithic objects displayed at the World Exposition in Paris the year before, rightly assumed that the paintings might also date from the Stone Age. He therefore engaged an archaeologist from the University of Madrid to help him in his further work.

=== Publication ===
Professor Juan Vilanova y Piera supported Sautuola's assumptions, and they published their results in 1880, to considerable public acclaim. In contrast, the scientific establishment of his day was reluctant to accept the presumed antiquity of the paintings. The French specialists, led by their guru Gabriel de Mortillet, were particularly adamant in rejecting the hypothesis of Sautuola and Piera and their findings were loudly ridiculed at the 1880 Prehistorical Congress in Lisbon. Due to the supreme artistic quality, and the exceptional state of conservation of the paintings, Sautuola was even accused of forgery. A fellow countryman maintained that the paintings had been produced by a contemporary artist, on Sautuola's orders.

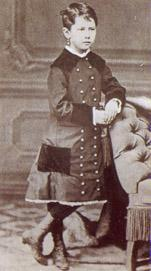
María Sanz de Sautuola, the discoverer of the Altamira paintings

During the next 20 years, several other findings of prehistoric paintings made the Altamira-paintings more plausible, and mainstream scientists retracted their opposition to the Spaniards. In 1902, the respected French archaeologist Émile Cartailhac, who had been one of the leading critics, emphatically admitted his mistake in the article, "Mea culpa d'un sceptique", published in the journal L'Anthropologie.

=== Legacy ===
Sautuola had died fourteen years before Cartailhac's apology, and did not live to enjoy the restitution of his honour or the later scientific confirmation of his premonitions. Modern dating techniques have since confirmed that the paintings of the Altamira cave were created over extended periods, ranging from 20,000 and 40,000 years ago. For the study of Paleolithic art, Sautuola's discoveries must now be considered pivotal.

== Family ==
Sautuola's daughter later married into the Botín family of Cantabrian bourgeoisie. The current owners of Banco Santander are Sautuola's descendants.
