= Henri Breuil =

French priest, archaeologist, anthropologist, and geologist (1877–1961)

- Abbé Breuil
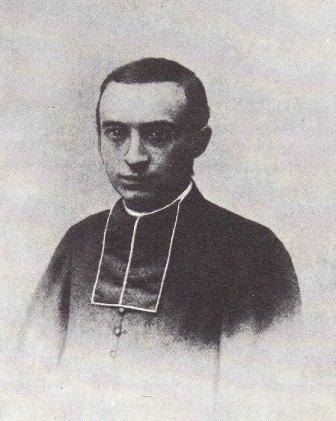
- Henri Breuil in 1954
- Born: 28 February 1877; Mortain, Manche, France
- Died: 14 August 1961 (aged 84); L'Isle-Adam, Val-d'Oise, France
- Education: Sorbonne
- Awards: Daniel Giraud Elliot Medal (1924); Albrecht-Penck-Medaille (1958)
- Scientific career
- Fields: Catholic priest; archaeologist; anthropologist; ethnologist; geologist

Henri Édouard Prosper Breuil (28 February 1877 – 14 August 1961), often referred to as Abbé Breuil (French pronunciation: [abe bʁœj]), was a French Catholic priest, archaeologist, anthropologist, ethnologist and geologist. He studied cave art in the Somme and Dordogne valleys as well as in Spain, Portugal, Italy, Ireland, China with Teilhard de Chardin, Ethiopia, British Somali Coast Protectorate, and especially southern Africa.

== Life ==
Breuil was born at Mortain, Manche, France, and was the son of Albert Breuil, magistrate, and Lucie Morio De L'Isle.

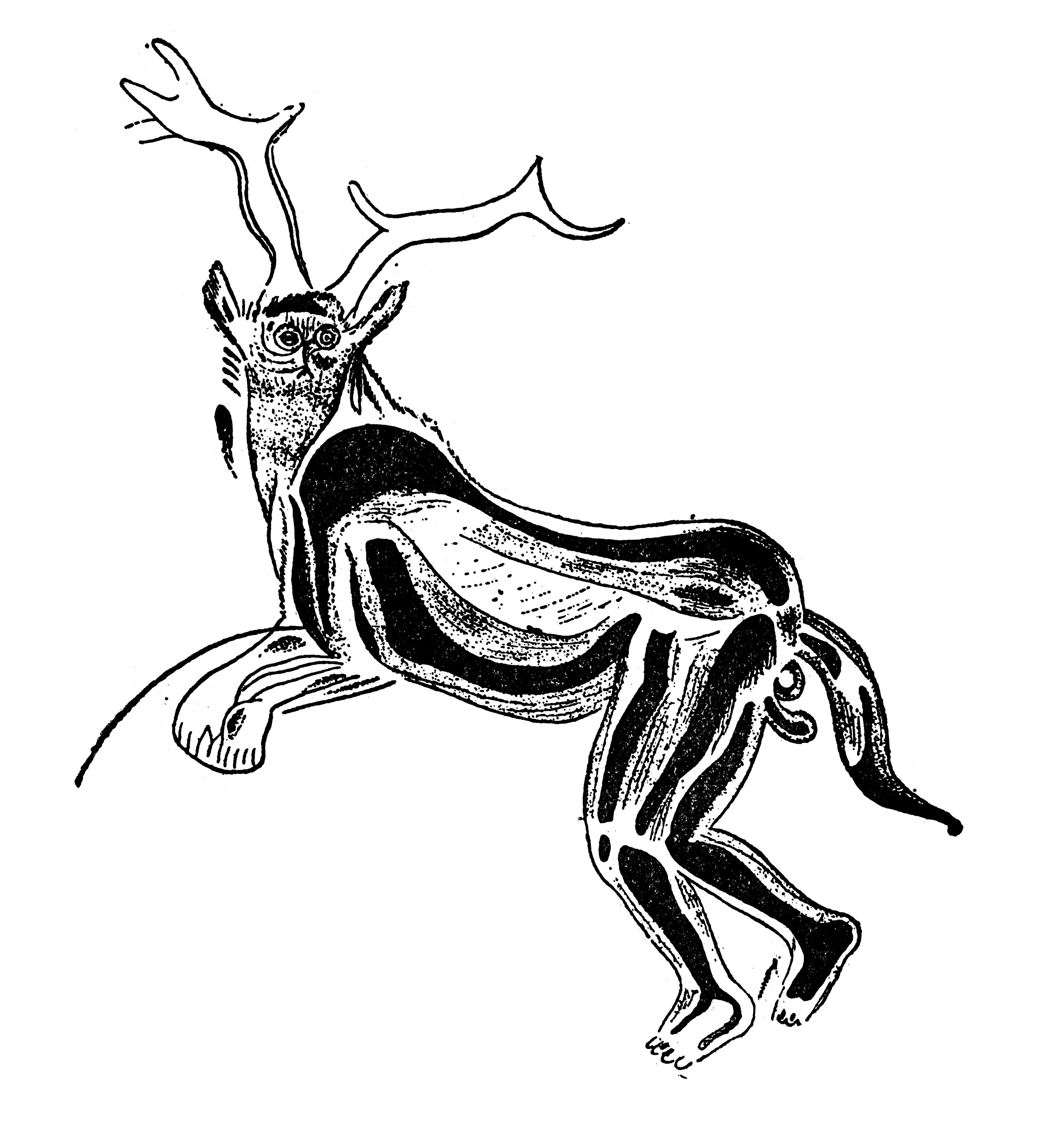
"The Sorcerer", one of Breuil's most enduring and controversial sketches.

He received his education at the Seminary of St. Sulpice and the Sorbonne and was ordained in 1900, and was also given permission to pursue his research interests. He was devoutly religious. In 1904 Breuil had recognised that a pair of 13,000-year-old carvings of reindeer at the British Museum were in fact one composition. He assumed a post as lecturer at the University of Fribourg in 1905, and in 1910 became professor of prehistoric ethnology in Paris and at the Collège de France from 1925.

== Cave paintings ==
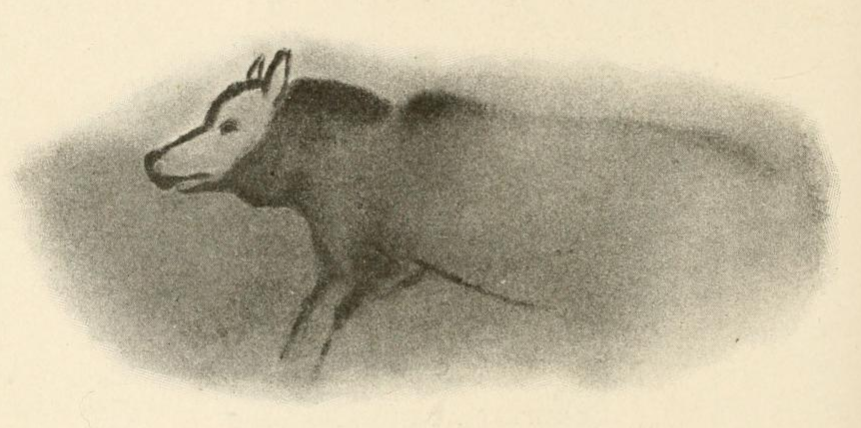
Polychrome cave painting of a wolf, Font-de-Gaume

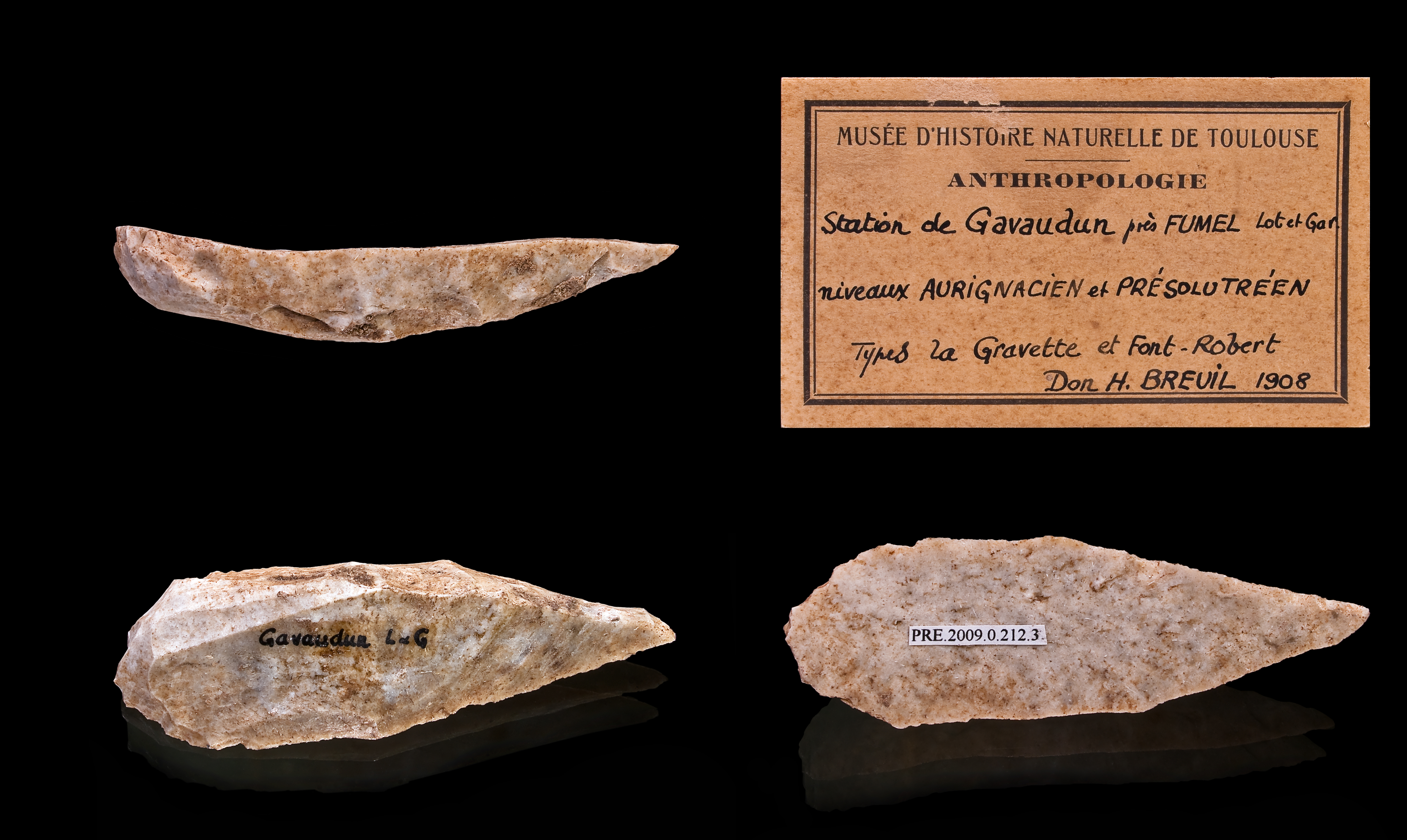
Scraper – Aurignacian

Breuil was a competent draughtsman, reproducing faithfully the cave paintings he encountered, although certain modern scholars have questioned the validity of Breuil's sketch known as "The Sorcerer" and his interpretation of it. In 1924 he was awarded the Daniel Giraud Elliot Medal from the National Academy of Sciences. He published many books and monographs, introducing the caves of Lascaux and Altamira to the general public and becoming a member of the Institut de France in 1938.

Breuil visited the excavations associated with Peking Man at Zhoukoudian, China in 1931 and confirmed the presence of stone tools at the site.

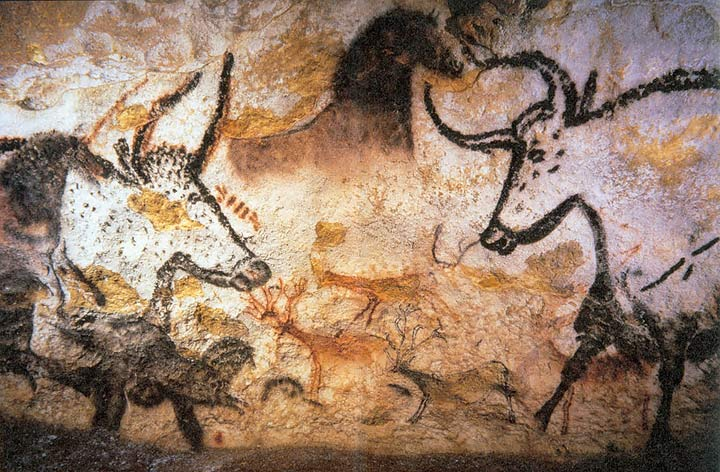
Aurochs, horses, and deer at Lascaux.

In 1929, when already a recognised authority on North African and European Stone Age art, he attended a congress on prehistory in South Africa. At the invitation of premier Jan Smuts he returned there in 1942 and began a professorship at Witwatersrand University from 1944 to 1951. During his South African stay he studied rock art in Lesotho, the eastern Free State and in the Natal Drakensberg. He performed three expeditions to South West Africa and Rhodesia between 1947 and 1950. He described this period as "the most thrilling years of my research life". He had excursions to South West Africa and Bechuanaland with a local archeologist, Kosie Marais. In 1953 he announced his discovery of a painting about 6,000 years old, subsequently dubbed The White Lady, under a rock overhang in Brandberg Mountain.

Breuil returned to France in 1952 and produced a series of publications sponsored by the government of South Africa. Breuil's books contain valuable photographs and sketches of the art works at the sites he visited but are marred by official South African racism. Breuil developed elaborate scenarios to attribute Caucasian authorship to the paintings he studied. For example, he had a theory that the beautiful painting known as "The White Lady of the Brandberg" had been painted by Egyptians (or some other Mediterranean people), who had improbably made their way thousands of miles southwest into the wilds of southern Africa, rather than accepting the logical and fairly obvious fact that the paintings were the product of (and clearly represent the lifestyle of) the Bushmen and other native peoples of southern Africa.

His contributions to European and African archaeology were considerable and recognised by the award of honorary doctorates from no fewer than six universities. He was President of the PanAfrican Archaeological Association from 1947 to 1955.

He died at L'Isle-Adam, Val-d'Oise, France.

== Published works ==
His works in English include:

- Rock Paintings of Southern Andalusia: A Description of a Neolithic and Copper Age Art Group (with M.C. Burkitt and Montagu Pollock). Oxford: Clarendon Press, 1928.
- The Cave of Altamira at Santillana del Mar, Spain (with Hugo Obermaier). Madrid, 1935.
- Four Hundred Centuries Of Cave Art. Montignac, Dordogne, 1952.
- The White Lady of the Brandberg (with Mary E. Boyle and E.R. Scherz). London: Faber and Faber; New York: Frederick A. Praeger, 1955.
- The Men of the Old Stone Age. New York: St. Martin's Press, 1965.
- The Paintings of the Tsisab Ravine
- The Rock Paintings Of Southern Africa (with Mary E. Boyle)

== See also ==
- Cave painting
- Caves of Gargas
- Cave of the Trois Frères
- Cueva de La Pasiega
- Cave of Altamira
- Pierre Teilhard de Chardin
- List of Roman Catholic cleric–scientists
- Les Combarelles
- Émile Cartailhac
