= Aventignan =

- Commune
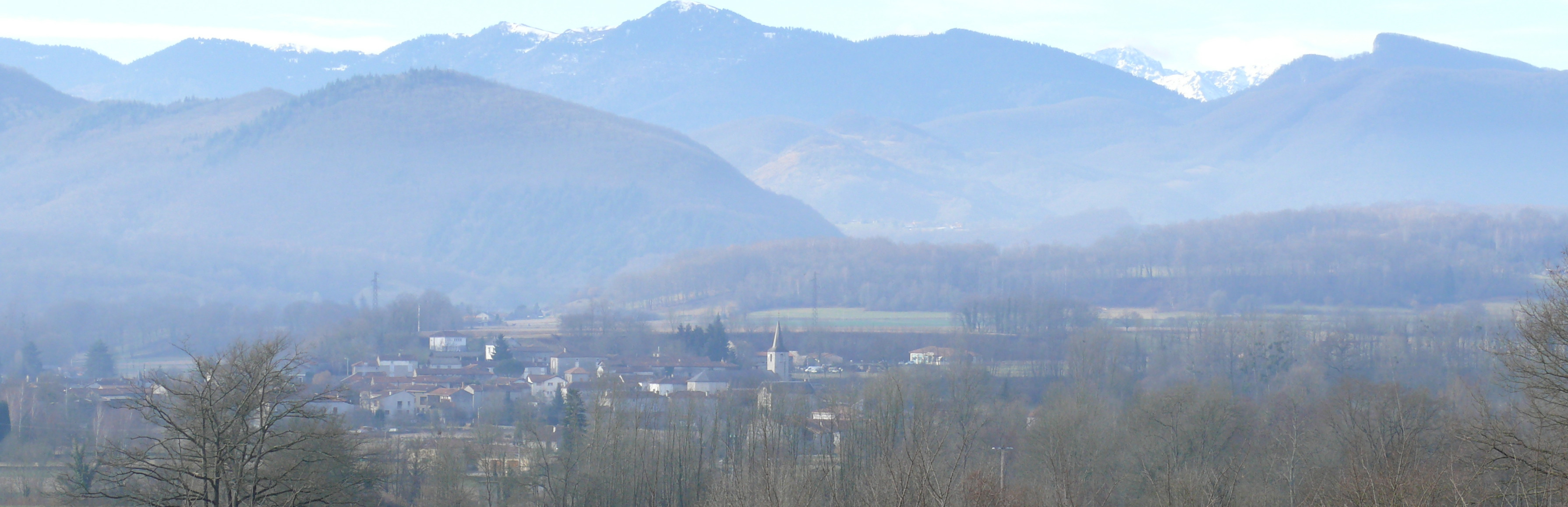

- Coat of arms
- Location of Aventignan
- Location within France Location within Occitanie
- Coordinates: 43°04′09″N 0°31′18″E
- Country: France
- Region: Occitania
- Department: Hautes-Pyrénées
- Arrondissement: Bagnères-de-Bigorre
- Canton: La Vallée de la Barousse
- Intercommunality: Neste Barousse

Government
  - Mayor (2020–2026): Yoan Rumeau
- Area^{1}: 5.22 km^{2} (2.02 sq mi)
- Elevation: 448 m (1,470 ft)
- Highest elevation: 783 m (2,569 ft)
- Lowest elevation: 434 m (1,424 ft)
- Population (2023): 204
  - Density: 39.1/km^{2} (101/sq mi)
- Time zone: UTC+01:00 (CET)
  - Summer (DST): UTC+02:00 (CEST)
- INSEE/Postal code: 65051 /65660
- ^{1} French Land Register data, which excludes lakes, ponds, glaciers > 1 km^{2} (0.386 sq mi or 247 acres) and river estuaries.

Aventignan (French pronunciation: [avɑ̃tiɲɑ̃]; Occitan: Aventinhan) is a commune in the Hautes-Pyrénées department in southwestern France.

== Geography ==
Close to Aventignan are the Gargas caves, a natural underground formation of stalactites and stalagmites. The caves are sometimes described as the Grotto of Gargas, in reference to an ancient chieftain who used the place as a prison.

== Population ==
Historical population
Year	Pop.	±% p.a.
1968	272	—
1975	225	−2.67%
1982	216	−0.58%
1990	208	−0.47%
1999	180	−1.59%
2007	179	−0.07%
2012	192	+1.41%
2017	205	+1.32%
2023	204	−0.08%
Source: INSEE

== See also ==
- Communes of the Hautes-Pyrénées department
