= Gabriel de Mortillet =

French anthropologist (1821–1898)

Louis Laurent Gabriel de Mortillet
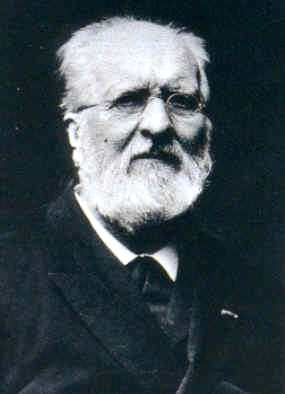
- Louis Laurent Gabriel de Mortillet
- Born: 29 August 1821; Meylan, Isère
- Died: 25 September 1898 (aged 77); St Germain-en-Laye
- Scientific career
- Fields: anthropology

Louis Laurent Gabriel de Mortillet (29 August 1821 – 25 September 1898), French archaeologist and anthropologist, was born at Meylan, Isère.

== Biography ==
Mortillet was educated at the Jesuit college of Chambéry and at the Paris Conservatoire. Becoming in 1847 proprietor of La Revue indépendante, he was implicated in the Revolution of 1848 and sentenced to two years' imprisonment. He fled the country and during the next fifteen years lived abroad, chiefly in Italy.

In 1858 he turned his attention to ethnological research, making a special study of the Swiss lake-dwellings. He also issued three works on the evidence for early man in North Italy, the third making a then unprecedented association with the Ice Age. He returned to Paris in 1863, and soon afterwards was appointed curator of the newly created Musée des Antiquités Nationales at Saint-Germain-en-Laye, with responsibility for the Stone Age collections. He became mayor of Saint-Germain-en-Laye, and in 1885 he was elected deputy for Seine-et-Oise.

He had meantime founded a review, Matériaux pour l'histoire positive et philosophique de l'homme, and in conjunction with Broca assisted to found the French School of Anthropology. In 1895, he was elected to the American Philosophical Society in 1895. He died at St Germain-en-Laye on 25 September 1898.

== Typological stages ==
Mortillet is best known for his clarification and ordering of the archeology of the Paleolithic. Where Édouard Lartet had used fauna as a distinguishing feature – Mammoth against Reindeer – for his important discoveries, Mortillet realised that as fauna varied with latitude they were unreliable indicators, and proposed instead a classification by means of dwelling places: Alluvial or Cave epochs, for example. Later acknowledging the ambiguity in that system as well, he published a new classification in 1869, using type sites and their associated artifacts to distinguish and name periods: (Chellian, Mousterian, Solutrean, Magdalenian, Robenhausen). His system may have subsequently been refined, but still remains in current use. However, whereas Mortillet believed his classifications were universal stages, with a unilineal evolution, later thinking regards each culture as a more localised conglomerate, capable of overlapping in time with others, not necessarily lineally related.

Mortillet proposed the name "Marnian Epoch" as a replacement for the period usually called the Gallic, which extends from about five centuries before the Christian era to the conquest of Gaul by Caesar. Mortillet generally objected to the term Gallic, as the civilization characteristic of the epoch was not peculiar to the ancient Gauls, but was common to nearly all Europe at the same date. The name is derived from the French département of Marne.

== Homosimius ==
J.-B. Rames discovered flints at Puy Courny which triggered debate on the presence of ancestral humans in the Miocene, and the new genus and species Homosimius ramesii was proposed by de Mortillet. G. de Mortillet also suggested that these tools should be classified as the "Puycournian Epoch". His hypothetical genus gained another species, H. bourgeoisi, from the Oligocene of Thenay, France based on similar flints and exhibited by Abbot Bourgeois at the International Congress of Anthropology and Prehistoric Archaeology hosted in Paris, 1867. G. de Mortillet (1883) named it in honour of Bourgeois, but Boule (1952) suggested usage as Homo bourgeoisi as a hypothetical link between apes and humans, with Homo riberoi (a hypothetical species named from Miocene flints near Otto, Lisbon) being intermediate between H. bourgeoisi and H. ramesi (a hypothetical species named from Aurillac). This genus would have served as an ancestor to Neanderthals and then humans in a linear stage, which de Mortillet envisioned these toolmakers as large-brained but not fully bipedal. Knowledge at the time contradicted his belief, as Homo erectus was demonstrably fully bipedal. As later analysis would reveal, the 'tools' were eoliths of natural origin and originated from (mostly) marine Miocene strata that predates human activities, but suggest integral geological activities.

== Stone age art ==
De Mortillet recognised the importance of the mobiliary art discovered by Lartet and Christie, commenting of such bone carvings, "They are not the work of children. They are the childhood of art". However he was unable to accept the authenticity of the much more extensive cave art that was coming to light, conservatively and stiffly rejecting Sautuola's discovery of the paintings in Altamira as the original work of Paleolithic man.

== Published works ==
- Promenades au Musée de Saint-Germain (1869)
- Classification des diverses périodes de l'âge de la pierre (1873)
- Musée préhistorique (1881)
- Le préhistorique, antiquité de l'homme (1882)
- Les Nègres et la civilisation égyptienne (1884)
- Origines de la chasse, de la pêche et de l'agriculture (1890)
- Le préhistoire : origine et antiquité de l'homme (1900)

== See also ==
- Henry Christie
