= Félix Regnault =

French physician, anthropologist and prehistorian

Félix Regnault (17 June 1863 in Rennes – 4 October 1938) was a French physician, anthropologist and prehistorian. He served as president of the Société d'Anthropologie de Paris and the Société préhistorique française (1928).

== Works ==
Partial list

- Regnault, F. (1895). Les artistes préhistoriques d’après les dernières découvertes. La Nature 1167(12 octobre 1895): 305–307.
- Regnault, F. (1897). Hypnotisme, religion. Preface by Camille Saint-Saëns.
- Regnault, F. (1900). Les Lépreux au Moyen-Age. in Correspondant Médical: Journal Médical, Scientifique Littéraire et Illustré 6(130):5.
- Regnault, F. (1907). Les Figurines Antiques Devant l'Art et la Médecine. Médecin (Paris, France) 4:26ff.
- Regnault, F. (1912). Les représentations de l'obésite dans l'art préhistorique. Bulletin de la Société d'Anthropologie de Paris, Series 6, 3:35-39.
- Regnault, F. (1924). Les representations de femmes dans l'art paléolithique sont stéatomères, non stéatopyges. Bulletin de la Société Préhistorique Francaise 21:84-88.

His collection of prehistoric artefacts is held by the Muséum de Toulouse.

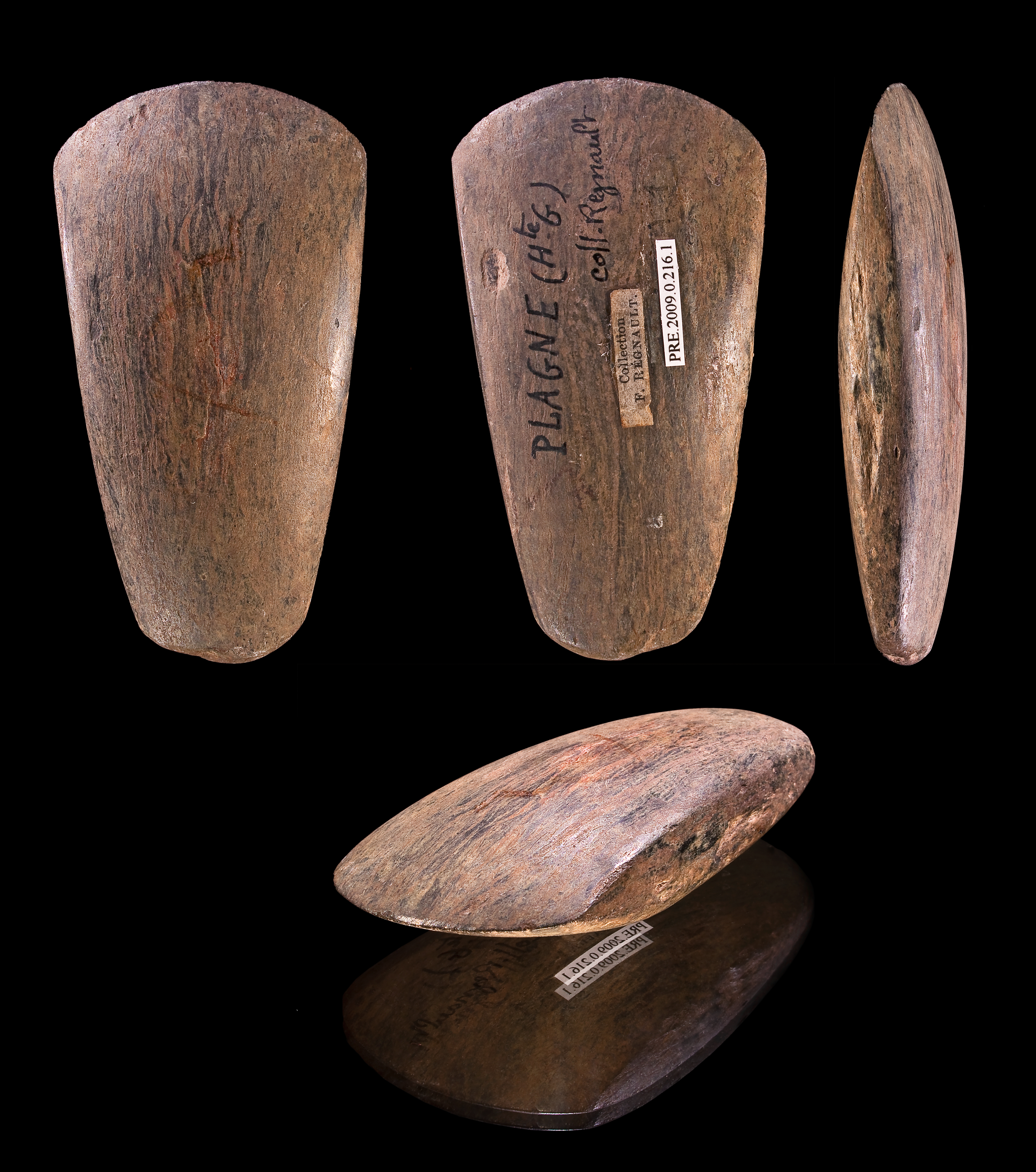
Neolithic axe from the Félix Regnault collection in Toulouse
