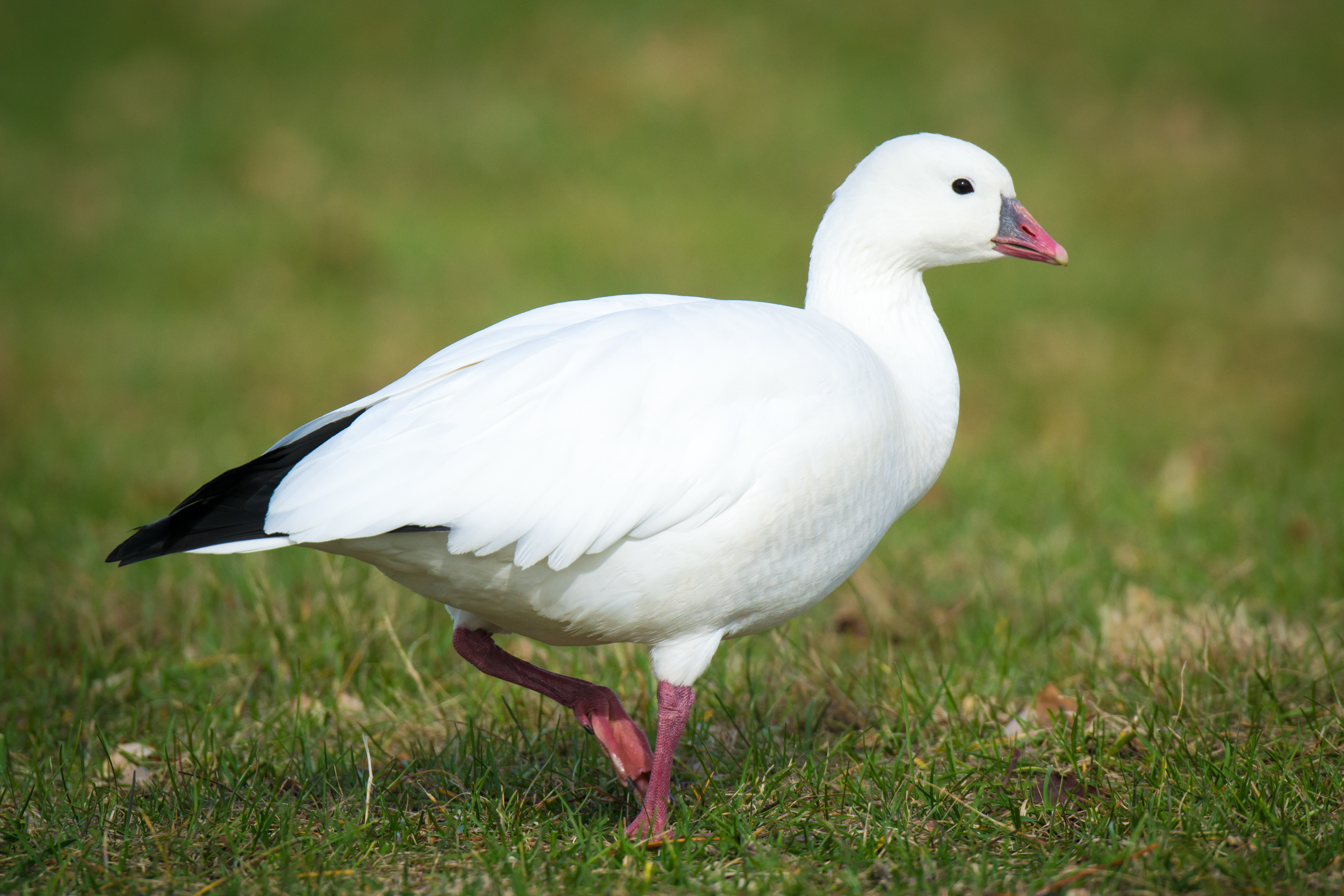
- Adult Ross's goose in Ohio, USA

Conservation status
- Least Concern (IUCN 3.1)

Scientific classification
- Kingdom: Animalia
- Phylum: Chordata
- Class: Aves
- Order: Anseriformes
- Family: Anatidae
- Genus: Anser
- Species: A. rossii

Binomial name
- Anser rossii Cassin, 1861
- Ross's goose range: Breeding Wintering Migration

Synonyms
- Chen rossii

= Ross's goose =

Species of bird

Ross's goose (Anser rossii) is a white goose with black wingtips and a relatively short neck. It is the smallest of the three white geese that breed in North America. It is similar in appearance to a white-phase snow goose, but about 40% smaller. Other differences from the snow goose are that the bill is smaller in proportion to its body and lacks "black lips". Like snow geese, Ross's geese may exhibit a darker "blue" phase or morph, though this is extremely rare (<0.01% of adult birds).

Before the early 1900s, this goose was considered a rare species, possibly as a consequence of open hunting, but numbers have increased dramatically as a result of conservation measures. It is now listed as a species of Least Concern by the IUCN, and is protected by the Migratory Bird Treaty Act.

Ross's goose is named in honor of Bernard R. Ross (1827–1874), who was associated with the Hudson's Bay Company in Canada's Northwest Territories. Members of the Hudson's Bay Company were the first Europeans to discover the arctic nesting grounds of Ross's geese in 1940. The first recognizable description of Ross's geese, under the name "horned wavey", was given by explorer Samuel Hearne 80 years before John Cassin named it after Ross.

== Taxonomy ==
Ross's geese, along with other "white geese" (i.e., snow goose, emperor goose) previously belonged to the genus Chen, but recent genetic sequencing has concluded that this genus was polyphyletic with the Anser genus, where most taxonomists now place Ross's goose and its allies.

Members of the Chen genus were officially transferred to Anser in the International Ornithological Committee's World Bird List version 6.3 in 2016.

== Description ==
Ross's goose has a rounded head above a short neck. The bill is short and triangular and has a bluish base with warty structures that increase in prominence with age. Adults are identified by all-white secondary feathers, while juveniles' are dark centered. Females average 6% smaller than males. Legs begin as olive gray on goslings and turn deep red as they mature.

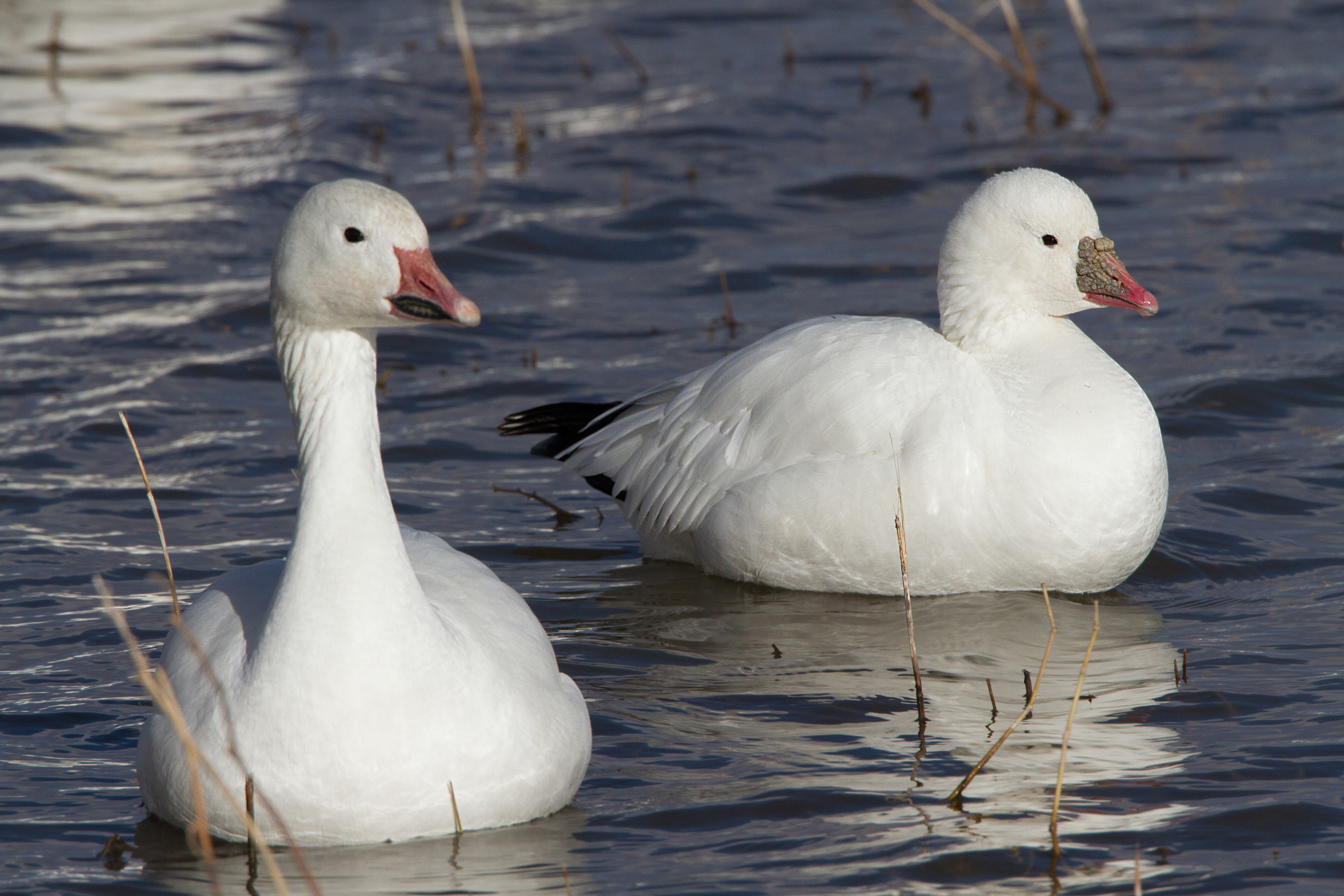
Snow goose (left) and Ross's goose (right) for comparison

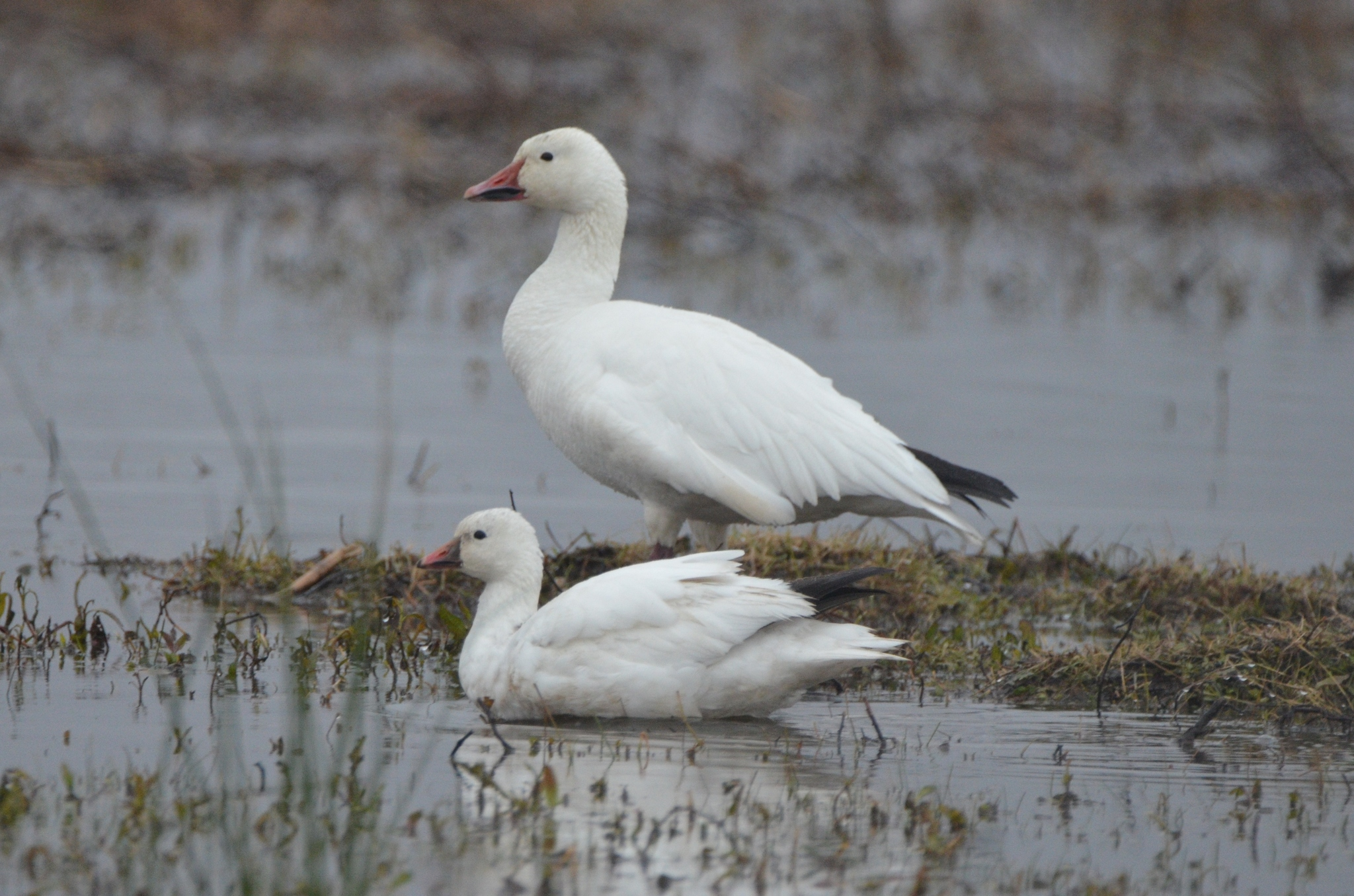
Ross's goose (foreground) and snow goose (background), in Louisiana

No geographic variation or identified subspecies is known. Related species include other Anser geese, particularly the lesser snow goose, where the two mtDNA lineages imply frequent hybridization. Two hypotheses about the evolution of Ross's goose are that they arose from a population of snow geese that were isolated by glacial advance or in a refugium that remained ice free.

Measurements:

- Male
  - Length: 23.2–25.2 in (59–64 cm)
  - Weight: 42.3–55.3 oz (1198–1567 g)
  - Wingspan: 44.5-45.7 in (113–116 cm)
- Female
  - Length: 22.6–24.4 in (57.3–62 cm)
  - Weight: 37.6–51.3 oz (1066–1454 g)

== Habitat ==
Landscape in the central Arctic is dominated by flat plains with some rock outcrops and drumlins, wet meadows, and marshy tundra. Vegetation includes patches of dwarf birch, willow, grasses, sedges, and low-growing vascular plants including crowberry, lapland rosebay, and lousewort.

== Behavior ==
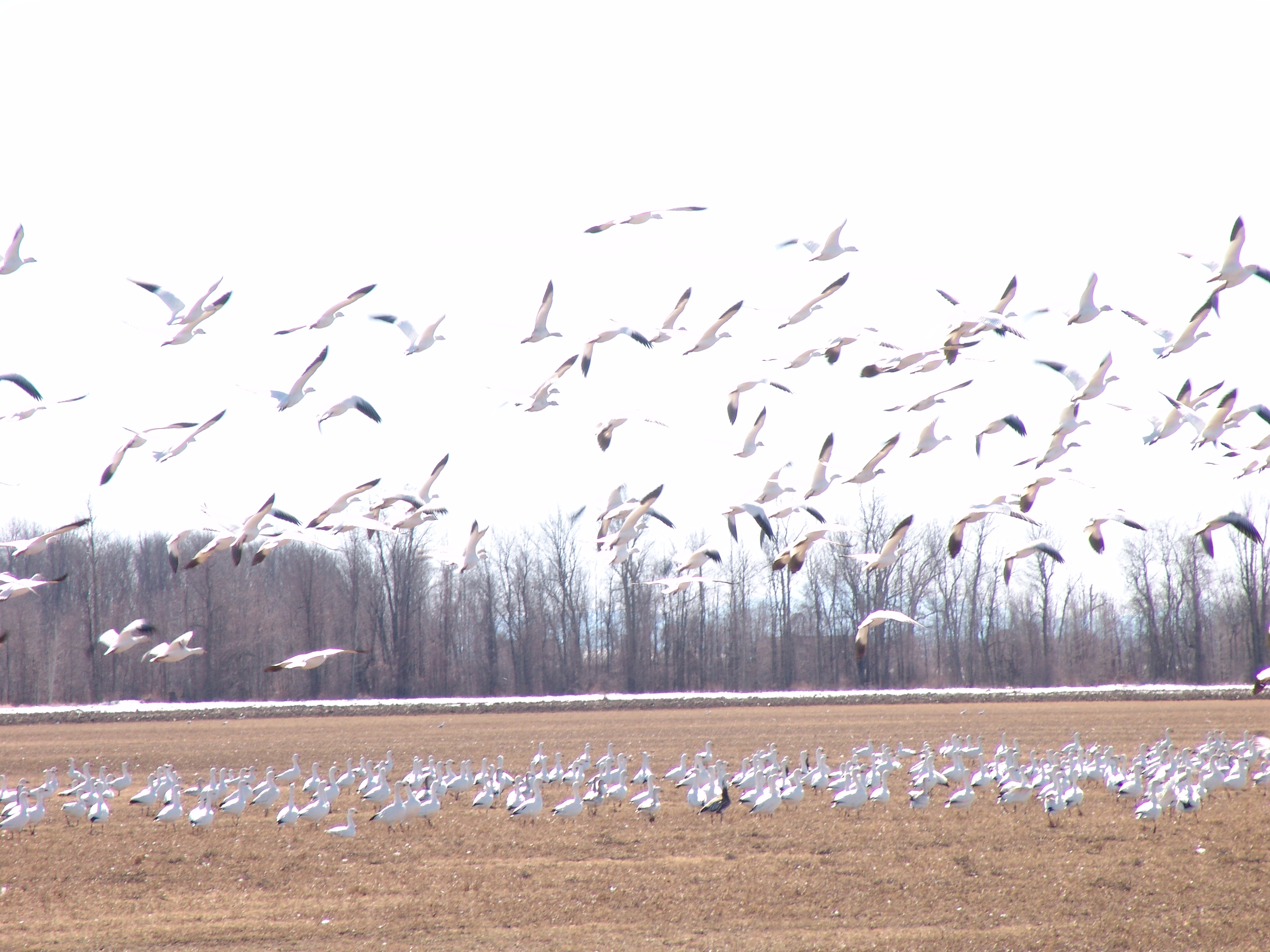
Ross's goose colony in Missisquoi National Wildlife Refuge

These birds migrate from their Canadian nesting grounds by mid-October, probably in response to limited food before freezing temperatures set in, and begin their return in mid-April to May.

Like most geese, they are grazers that feed on grasses, sedges, and small grains. They often forage in large, mixed flocks with snow geese. Large colonies of nesting birds can cause extensive damage to plants by overgrazing.

=== Reproduction ===
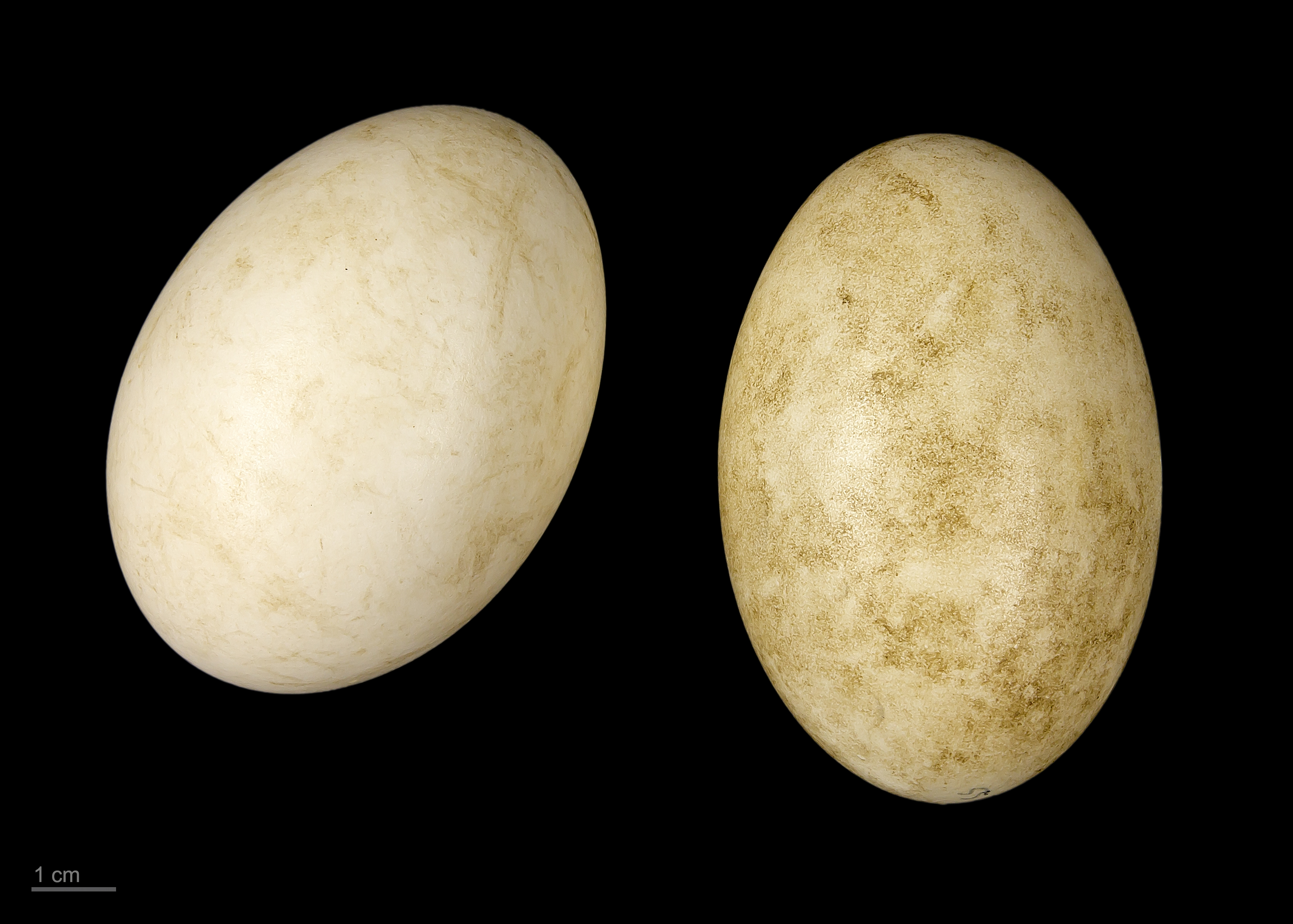
Ross's goose eggs from the collection of Jacques Perrin de Brichambaut.

Ross's geese form large nesting colonies on islands in shallow lakes and adjacent mainland, building nests on the ground made of twigs, leaves, grass, moss, and down. Females lay an average of four eggs per clutch and incubate the nest for 21–23 days. The eggs measure 6.54–8.02 cm (2.6–3.2 in) in length and 4.43–5.14 cm (1.7–2 in) in length.

A study of ground-based sampling along the McConnell River on the west coast of Hudson Bay reported a population of about 81,000 nesting Ross's geese.

== Conservation and management ==
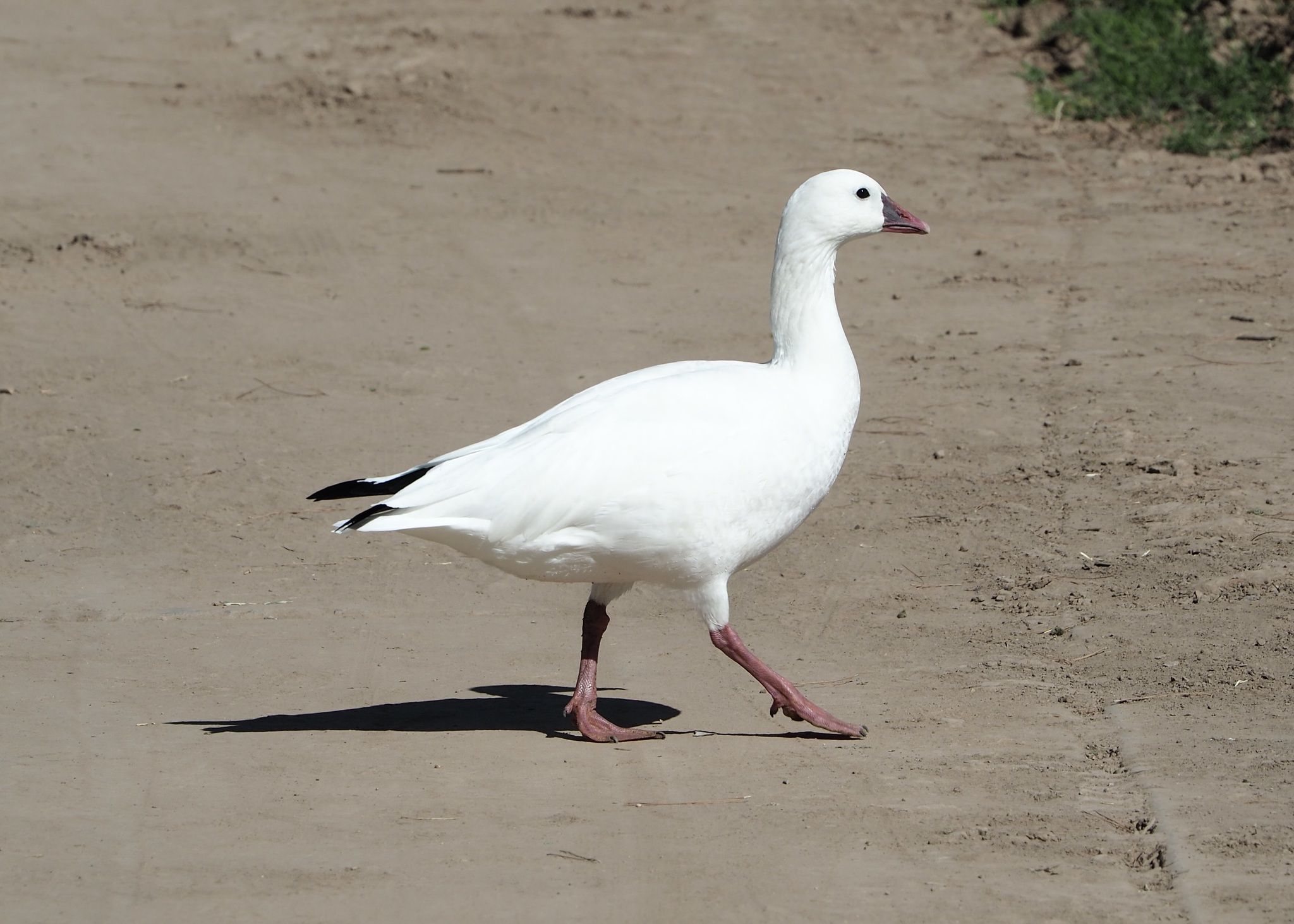
In Arizona

The number of nesting birds in the Queen Maud Gulf hit a record low of 2,000-3,000 in the early 1950s due to extensive shooting and trapping and their subsequent sale in California markets. Hunting of Ross's geese was made illegal in the U.S. in 1931. When populations on wintering grounds began to increase again, restricted hunting was introduced. Today, Ross's goose is protected under the Migratory Bird Treaty Act.
