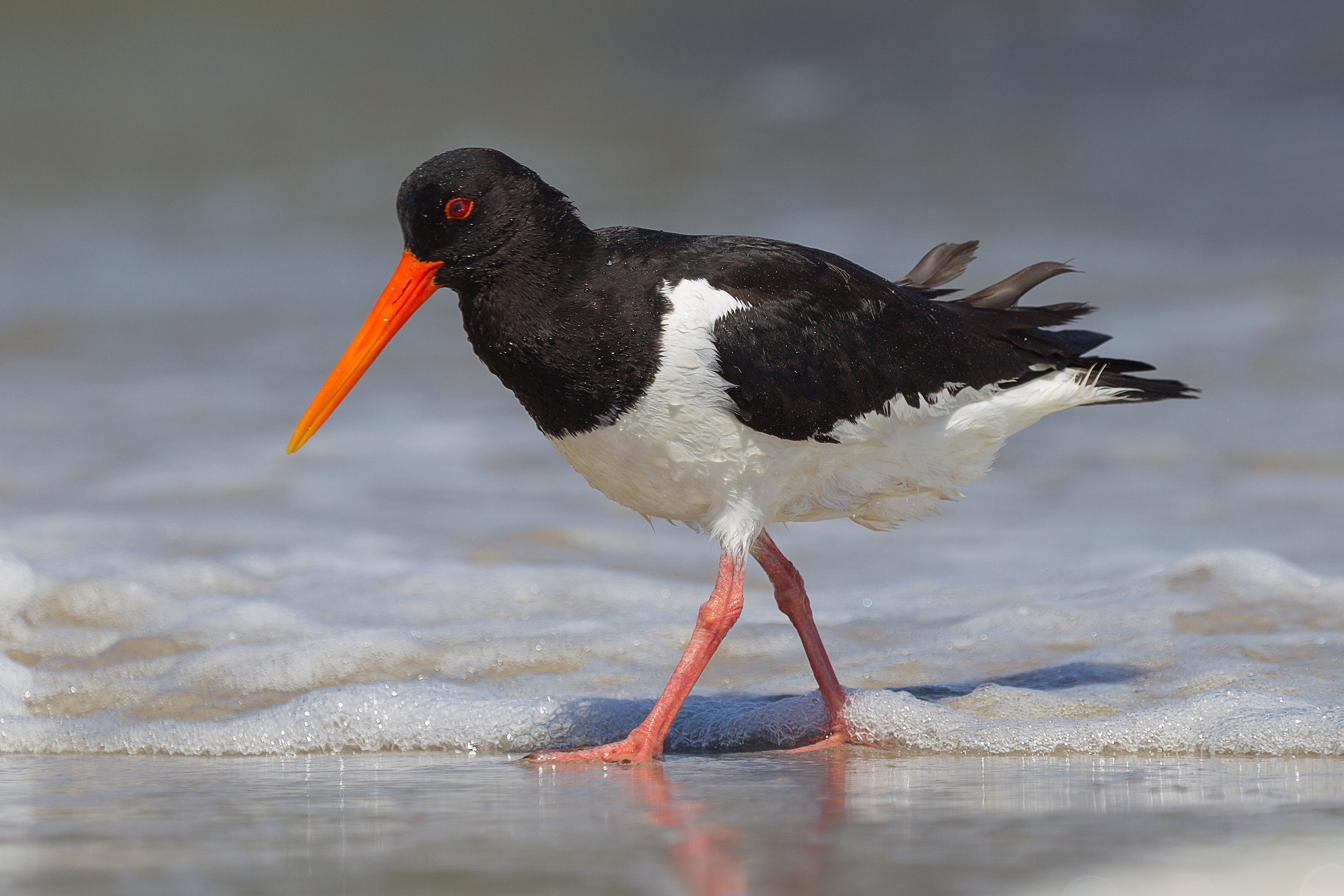

Conservation status
- Near Threatened (IUCN 3.1)

Scientific classification
- Kingdom: Animalia
- Phylum: Chordata
- Class: Aves
- Order: Charadriiformes
- Family: Haematopodidae
- Genus: Haematopus
- Species: H. ostralegus

Binomial name
- Haematopus ostralegus Linnaeus, 1758
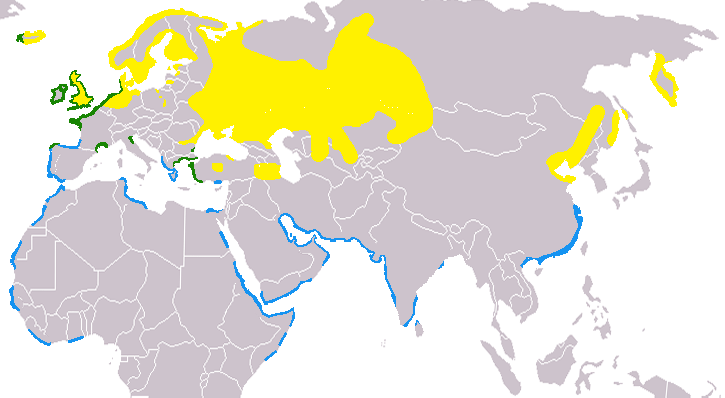
- Range of H. ostralegus Breeding range Year-round range Wintering range

Audio
- Calls recorded at Loch Fleet, Scotland

= Eurasian oystercatcher =

Species of bird

The Eurasian oystercatcher or European oystercatcher (Haematopus ostralegus), also known as the common pied oystercatcher, or (in Europe) just oystercatcher, is a wader in the oystercatcher bird family Haematopodidae. It has striking black and white plumage, a long straight orange-red bill, red eyes and relatively short dull pink legs. The sexes are similar in appearance but the bill of the female is longer than that of the male.

It is the most widespread of the oystercatchers, with four subspecies breeding in western Europe, central Eurosiberia, Kamchatka, China, and the western coast of Korea. No other oystercatcher occurs within this area.

== Taxonomy ==
The Eurasian oystercatcher was listed by Swedish naturalist Carl Linnaeus in 1758 in the 10th edition of his Systema Naturae under the binomial name Haemotopus ostralegus. The genus name Haematopus combines the Ancient Greek haima αἷμα meaning "blood" and pous πούς meaning "foot". The specific epithet ostralegus combines the Latin ostrea meaning "oyster" and legere meaning "to gather".

The name "oyster catcher" was coined by Mark Catesby in 1731 as a common name for the North American species H. palliatus, described as eating oysters. William Yarrell in 1843 established this as the preferred term, replacing the older name sea pie.

Four subspecies are recognised:

Image	Scientific name	Distribution	Notes
Núpur, Iceland	H. o. ostralegus Linnaeus, 1758	Breeds Iceland to Scandinavia and south Europe, winters from Britain south to west Africa	
Sluch River, Lyubykovychi, Rivne Oblast, Ukraine	H. o. longipes Buturlin, 1910	Breeds Ukraine and Turkey to central Russia and west Siberia, winters in east Africa	
Khijadiya Bird Sanctuary, Jamnagar, Gujarat, India (wintering)	H. o. buturlini Dementiev, 1941	Breeds west Kazakhstan to northwest China, winters in southwest Asia and India	
Khabarovsk Krai, Pacific coast of Russia	H. o. osculans Swinhoe, 1871	Breeds Kamchatka Peninsula, Korean Peninsula, and northeast China, winters in east China	Disjunct from the other subspecies with a 2,500 km gap between its range and H. o. buturlini

The subspecies H. o. osculans lacks white on the shafts of the outer 2–3 primaries and has no white on the outer webs of the outer five primaries; it is probably better treated as a separate species, but has not yet been formally recognised as such.

The extinct Canary Islands oystercatcher (Haematopus meadewaldoi), usually considered as a distinct species, may have actually been an isolated subspecies or distinct population of the Eurasian oystercatcher.

== Description ==
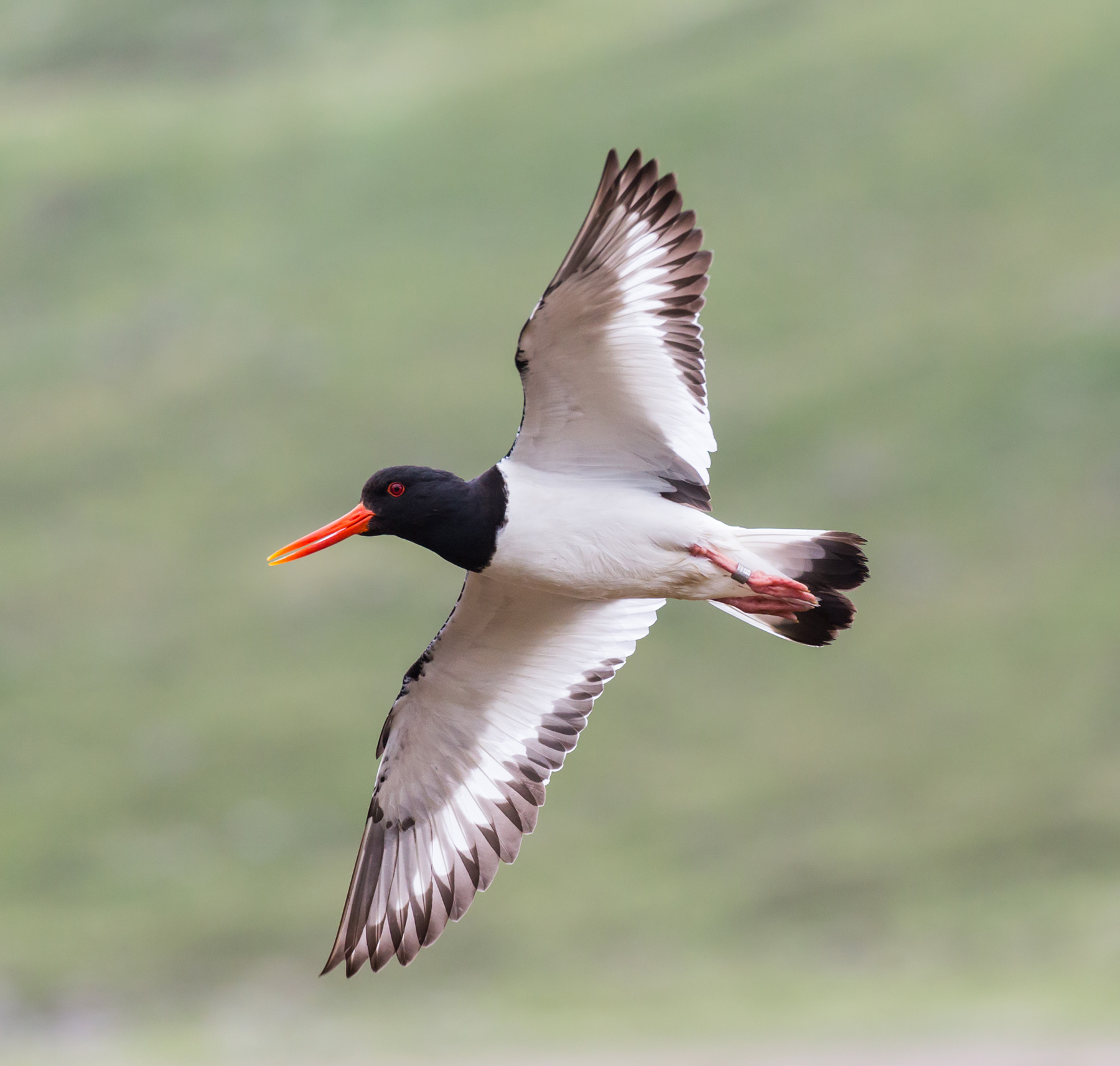
Eurasian oystercatcher flying on Loch Sligachan on the Isle of Skye, Scotland

The oystercatcher is one of the largest waders in the region. It is 40–45 cm (16–18 in) long, the bill accounting for 8–9 cm (3–3 1/2 in), and has a wingspan of 80–85 cm (31–33 in). It is an obvious and noisy plover-like bird, with black and white plumage, pink legs and a strong broad red bill used for smashing or prising open molluscs such as mussels or for finding earthworms. The sexes are similar in plumage but the female has a longer bill than the male. The winter plumage differs slightly from the breeding plumage in having a white throat collar; this is only shown for a short time in adults, but for longer in immature birds. Despite its name, oysters do not form a large part of its diet. The bird still lives up to its name, as few if any other wading birds are capable of opening oysters.

This oystercatcher is unmistakable in flight, with white patches on the wings and tail, otherwise black upperparts, and white underparts. Young birds are more brown, have a white neck collar and a duller bill. The call is a distinctive loud piping.

The bill shape varies; oystercatchers with broad bill tips open molluscs by prising them apart or hammering through the shell, whereas pointed-bill birds dig up worms. Much of this is due to the wear resulting from feeding on the prey. Individual birds specialise in one technique or the other which they learn from their parents. It shows clinal variation in bill length with an increase from west to east. The subspecies H. o. longipes has distinctly brownish upperparts and the nasal groove extends more than halfway along the bill. In the subspecies H. o. ostralegus the nasal groove stops short of the half-way mark.

The American oystercatcher (Haematopus palliatus) differs from the Eurasian oystercatcher in having a yellow eye and blackish-brown rather than black dorsal plumage.

== Distribution and migration ==
The oystercatcher is a migratory species over most of its range. The European population breeds mainly in northern Europe, but in winter the birds can be found in north Africa and southern parts of Europe. Although the species is present all year in Ireland, Great Britain and the adjacent European coasts, there is still migratory movement; the large flocks that are found in the estuaries of south-west England in winter mainly breed in northern England or Scotland. Similar movements are shown by the Asian populations. The birds are highly gregarious outside the breeding season. It is a rare vagrant as far south as southern Africa, where it can occur together with the all-black African oystercatcher. It is commonly found in lowland plains (< 200 m a.s.l.) that are flat, have short vegetation, and are close to water.

== Breeding ==
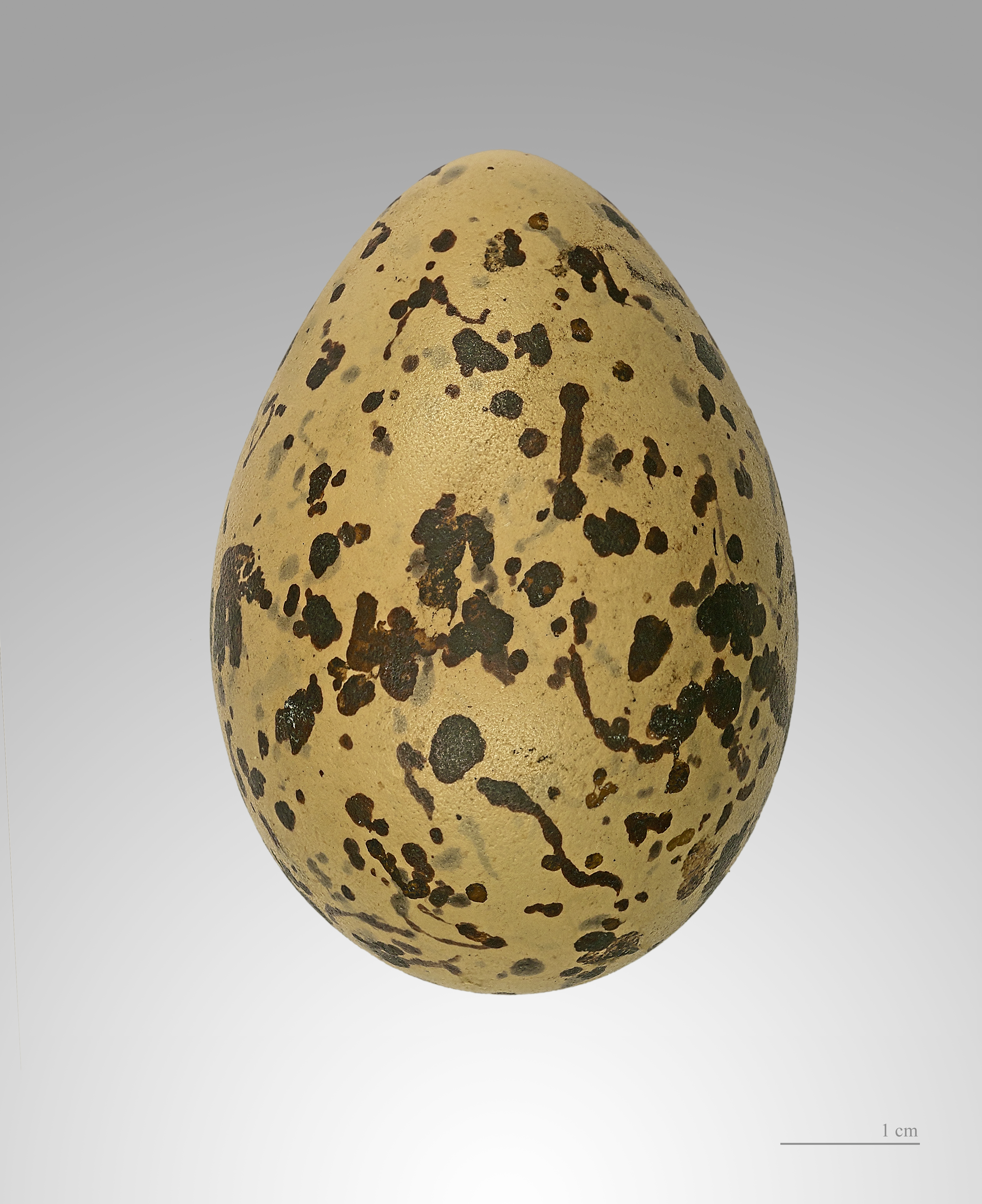
Egg, Jacques Perrin de Brichambaut collection, Muséum de Toulouse

The mating system is monogamous and the pair-bond usually lasts for many years. They first breed when they are between three and five years of age. The nest is a bare scrape on pebbles, on the coast or on inland gravelly islands. Two to four eggs are laid. On average the eggs are 57 mm × 40 mm (2.2 in × 1.6 in) in size and weigh 47 g (1.7 oz). They are buffish-yellow in colour with black-brown blotches and streaks. Beginning after the last egg is laid, they are incubated by both parents and hatch synchronously after 24–27 days. The young are precocial and nidifugous. They are brooded by both parents and leave the nest after one or two days. They are fed by both parents. Only one brood is raised in a season. Both eggs and chicks are highly cryptic.

Similar to many other ground nesters, they defend the nest by attacking aerial predators (such as ravens) in the air, while they deal with ground threats via distraction. When not foraging, the male commonly stands guard and will often be the first (and more adamant) to react, but the female will also leave the nest to take part. The pair will repeatedly vocalise to try to get the threat to pursue them away from the nest. If the threat is particularly close to the nest, they may make short low distraction flights, or even feign injuries. However, with repeated exposure to a particular threat (such as a human), they tend to become somewhat accustomed to them and not as prone to react, with the female often not even leaving the nest.

== Status ==
Because of its large numbers and readily identified behaviour, the oystercatcher is an important indicator species for the health of the ecosystems where it congregates. Extensive long-term studies have been carried out on its foraging behaviour in northern Germany, the Netherlands, and particularly on the River Exe estuary in south-west England. These studies form an important part of the foundation for the modern discipline of behavioural ecology.

It is a long-lived bird; an adult (at least three years old) ringed in England in 1982 was recaptured in 2025, 43 years after ringing, making it at least 46 years old.

== Gallery ==
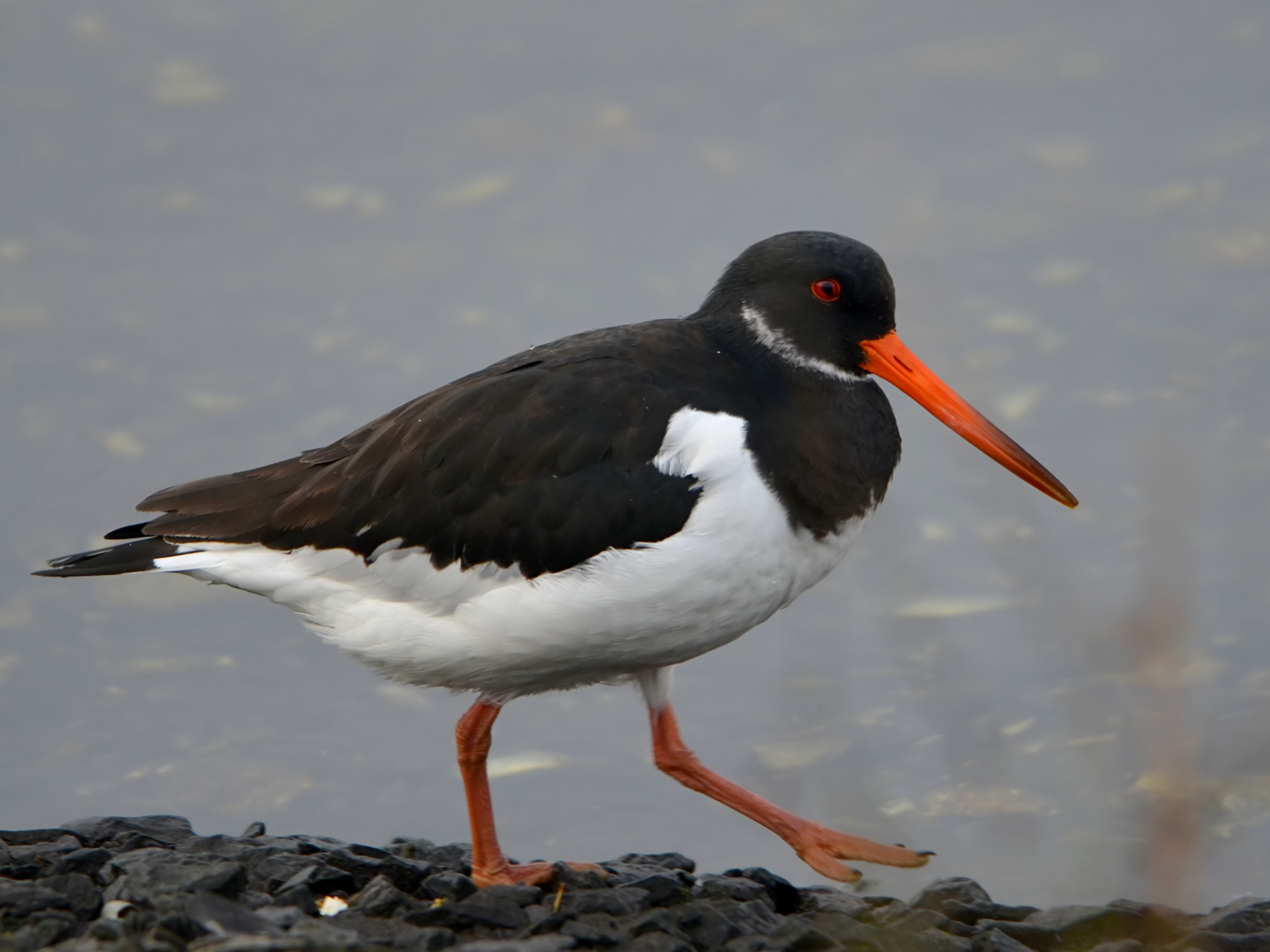
Non-breeding plumage with white collar

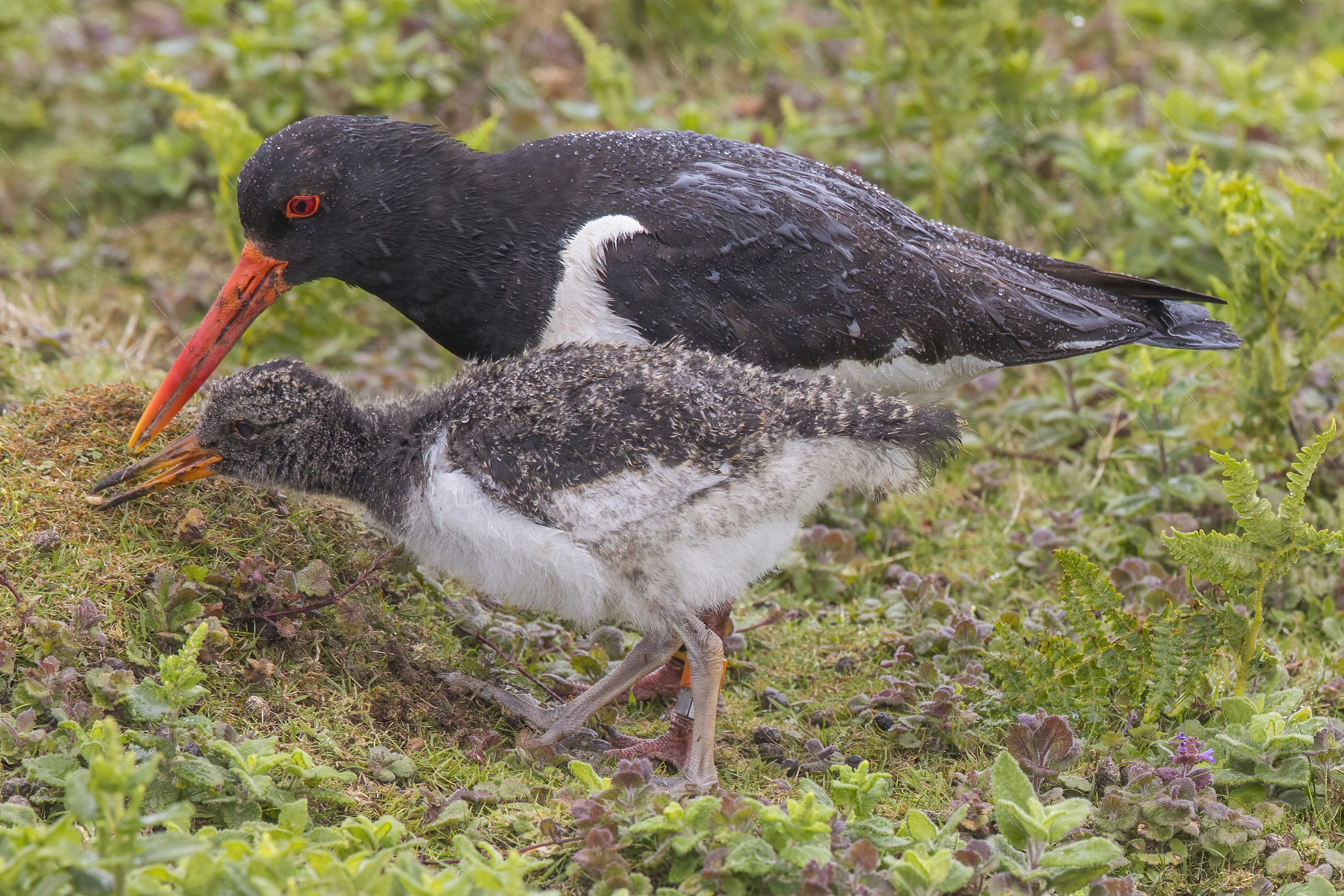
Parent with chick, Skomer Island

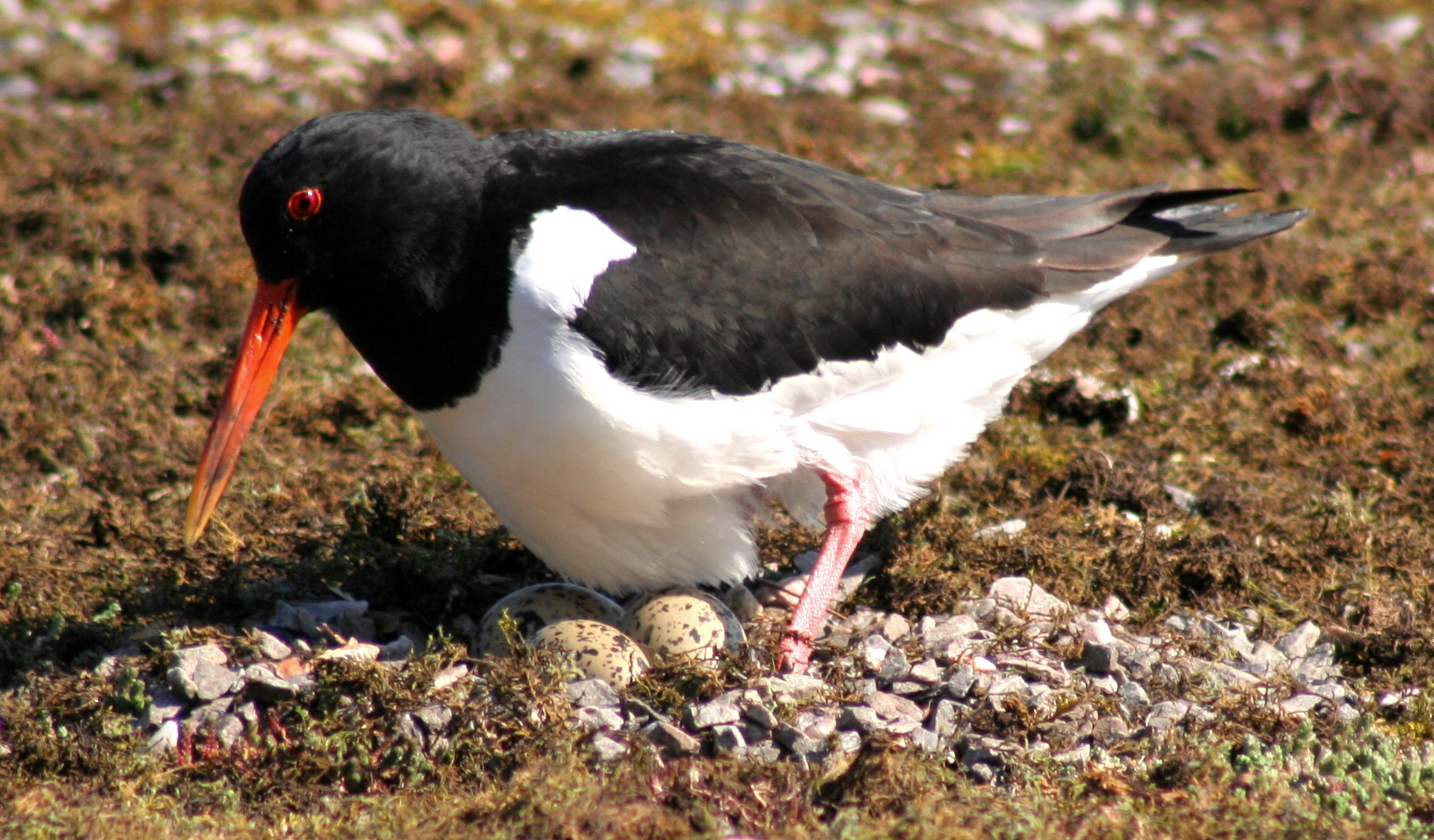
Nesting, Dornoch (Scotland)

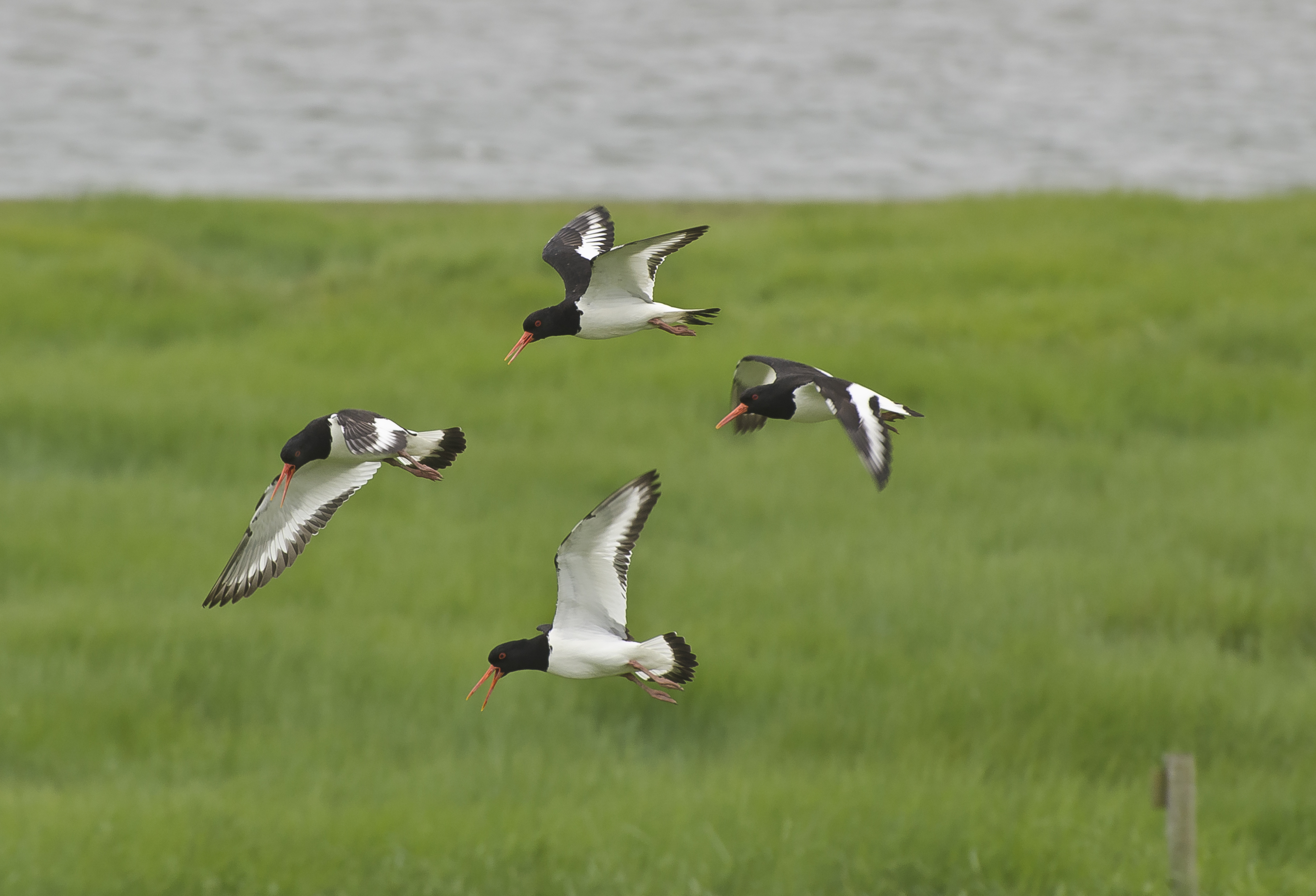
Four adults in flight (Hamburger Hallig, North Frisia)

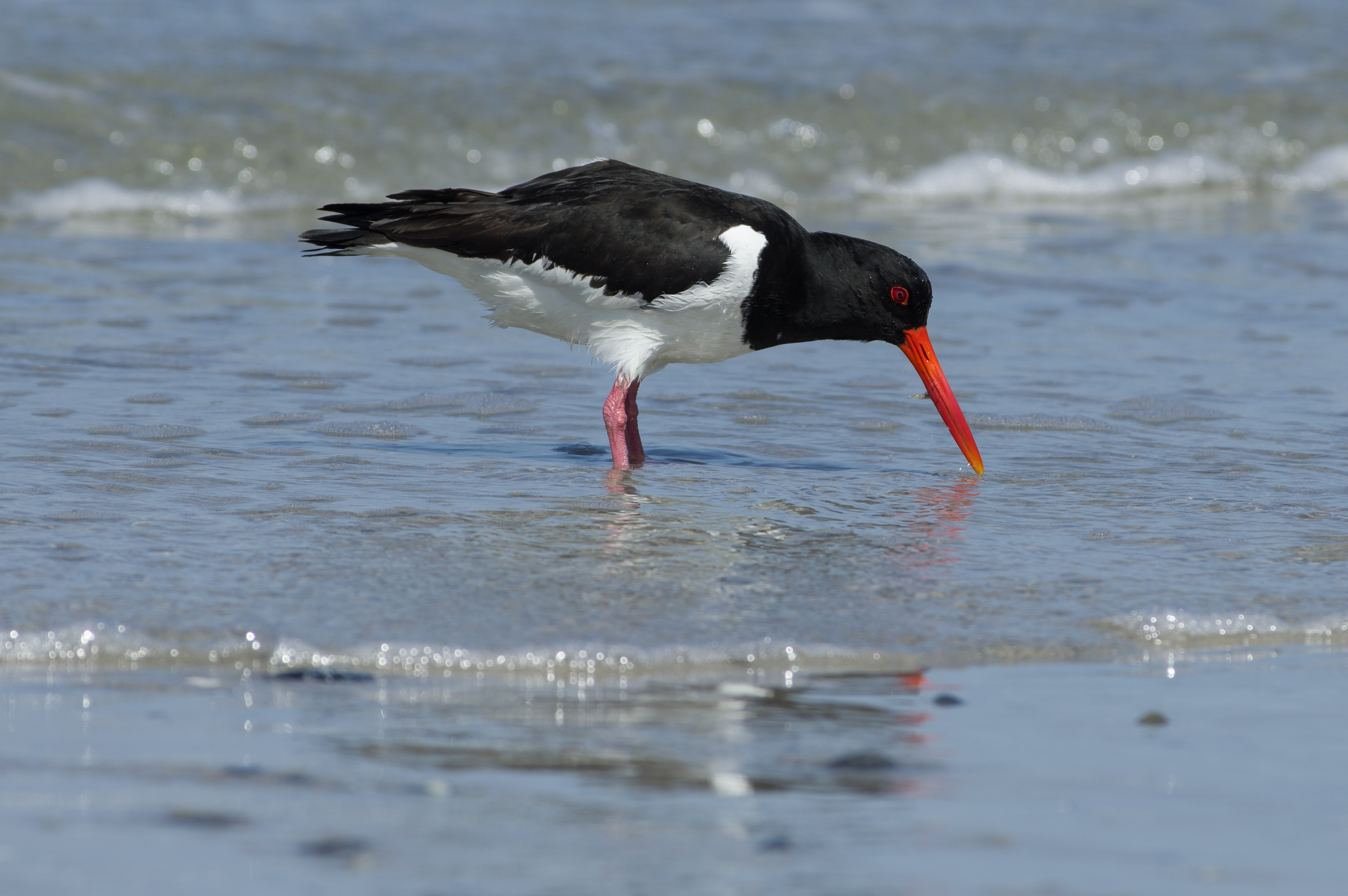
Heligoland

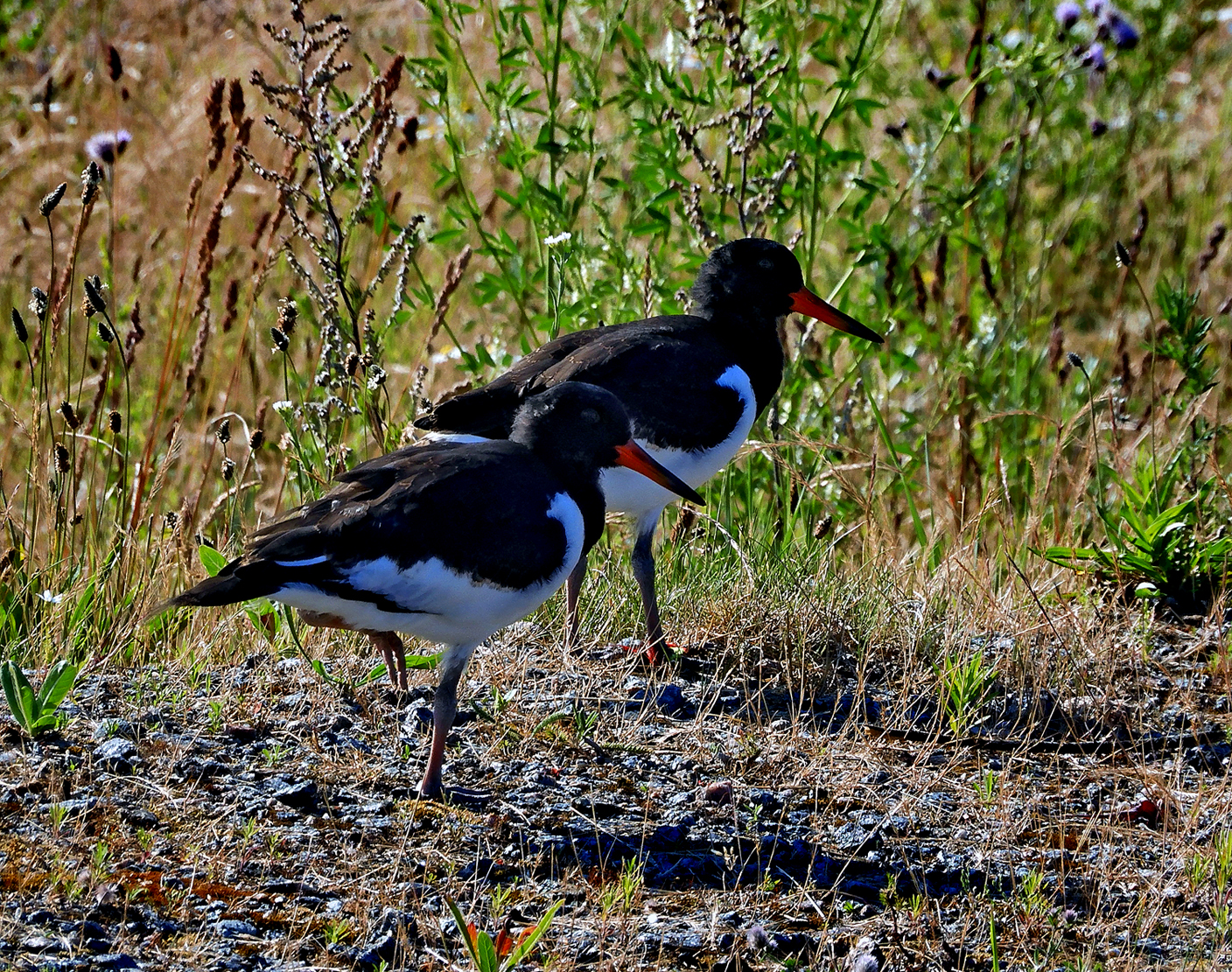
Only three weeks old and fully ready to fly.

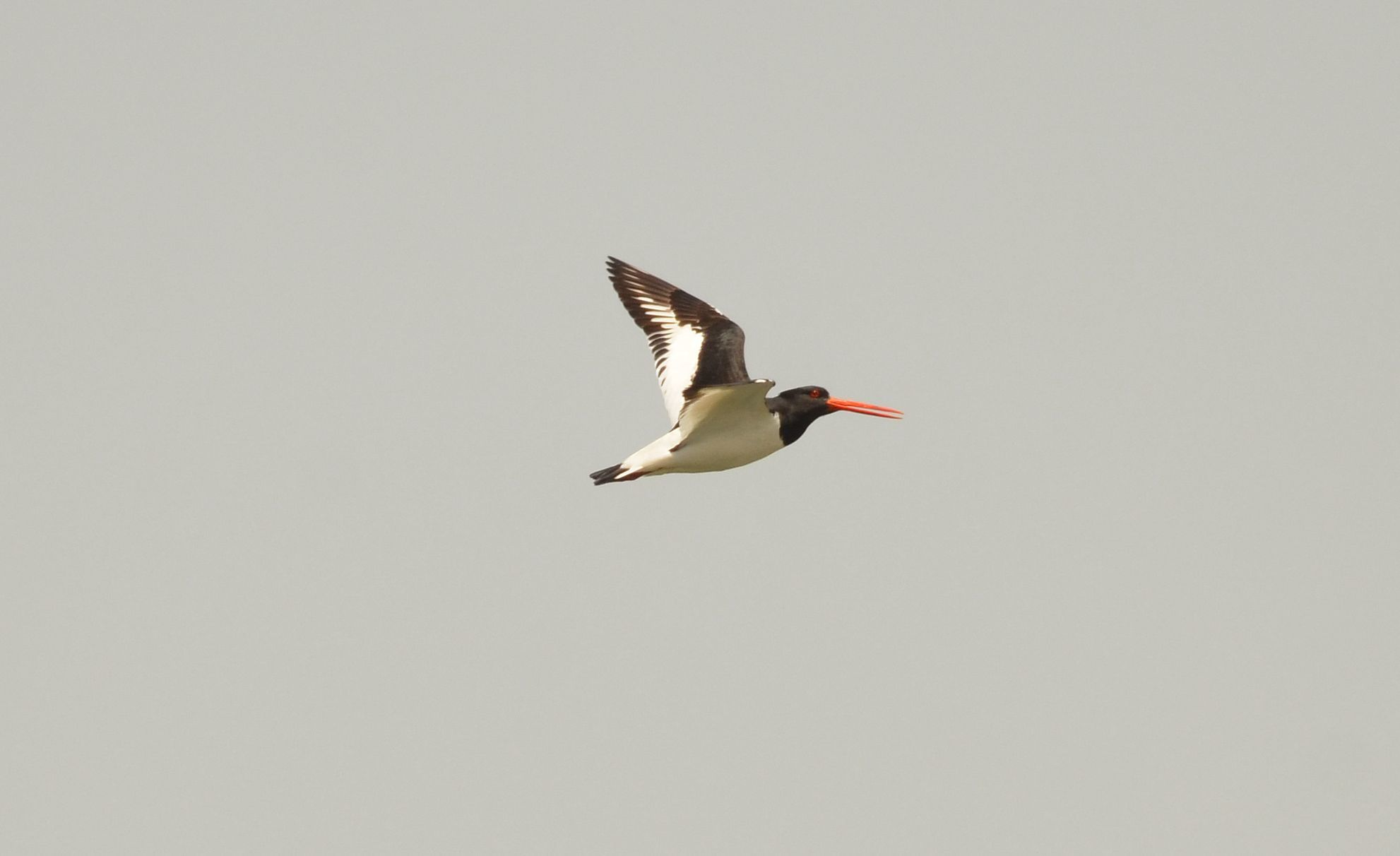
H. o. osculans in flight, Hebei, China

== Sources ==
- Cramp, Stanley, ed. (1983). "Haematopus ostralegus Oystercatcher". Handbook of the Birds of Europe the Middle East and North Africa. The Birds of the Western Palearctic. Vol. 3: Waders to Gulls. Oxford: Oxford University Press. pp. 17–35. ISBN 978-0-19-857506-1.
