= Bernard Rogan Ross =

Canadian pelt trader and zoologist (1827–1874)

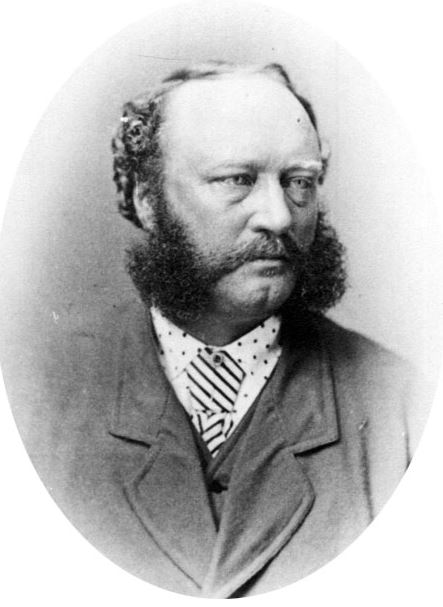
Portrait photograph of Ross

Bernard Rogan Ross (25 September 1827 – 21 June 1874) was a Hudson's Bay Company trader and a naturalist who worked in Canada, where he collected natural history specimens. Ross's goose is named after him.

Ross was born in Derry, Ireland, to James and Elizabeth Rogan. He studied at Foyle College and joined the Hudson's Bay Company after receiving a suggestion from Sir George Simpson, whom he met at his uncle Frank Rogan's home. He taught at Cornwall for some time and moved to Norway House, where he was an apprentice clerk. After moving to many locations, in 1865, he became the chief trader at Fort Simpson. After a visit by Robert Kennicott to collect natural history specimens, he too became inspired and began to collect specimens of mammals, insects and birds which were sent to several museums including the Smithsonian (more than 2,200 specimens), the Royal Scottish Museum, and the British Museum of Natural History. Ross's goose was named from one of his specimens in 1861. He was made a fellow of several learned societies. He retired in 1871.

Ross was a Freemason and a member of the Anglican Church. He married Christiana, daughter of Donald Ross (unrelated superior in the Hudson's Bay Company), in 1860, and they had three children (b. 1861). Donald Ross once described Bernard Ross as "one of the greatest blunderers this country every produced" noting that in return for specimens that he sent to Spencer Baird in the Smithsonian, he received rewards in the form of membership to learned societies, tobacco, and alcohol among other gifts. He died in Toronto, Canada.
