= Jacques Perrin de Brichambaut =

French ornithologist

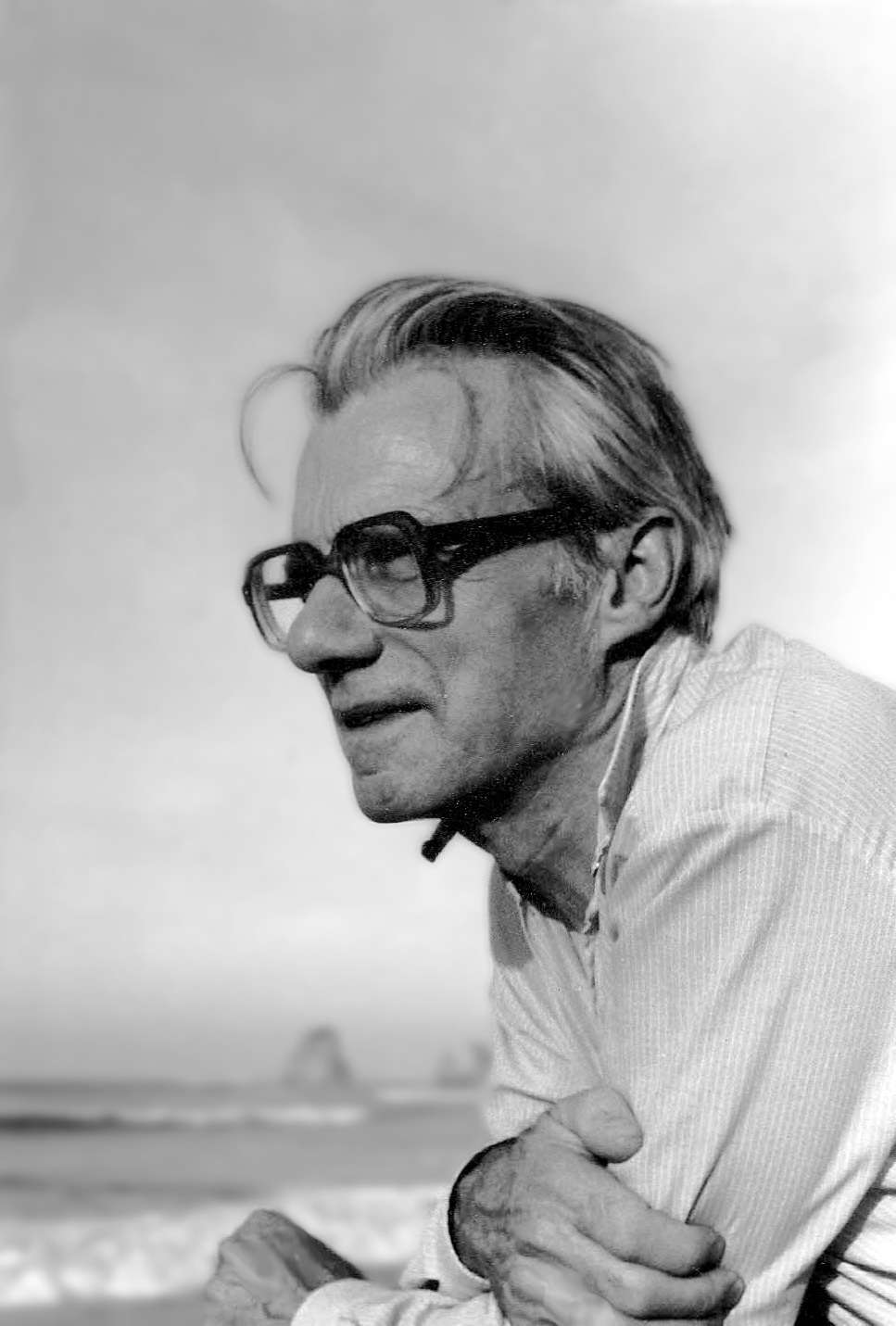
Jacques Perrin de Brichambaut

Jacques Perrin de Brichambaut (18 October 1920, Paris – 17 March 2007, Paris) was a French ornithologist.

His bird collections are held by Muséum de Toulouse. The Jacques Perrin de Brichambaut egg collection includes all the Palearctic species (Europe, North Africa and Asia), that is to say approximately 1,000 species and nearly 15,000 eggs and is one of the most complete and best documented palearctic egg collections in Europe.

== Works ==
- Quelques observations sur le terrain Oiseaux de France 1951
- Capture d’un aigle doré dans la région de Paris Oiseaux de France 1951
- Chevalier guignette et Hirondelle de rivage Oiseaux de France 1953
- Les becs-croisés à Noirmoutier Oiseaux de France 1953
- Quelques remarques sur le Goëland argenté des côtes de France Oiseaux de France 1954
- Passage d’oiseaux aquatique en baie de Seine Oiseaux de France 1954
- Le Bec-croisé Oiseaux de France 1955
- Quelques observations dans la région de Toulouse Oiseaux de France 1956
- Observations aux Marais Vernier (Quillebeuf)Oiseaux de France 1956
- Observations de pigeons ramiers Alauda1956
- Bec-croisés dans l’Oise Alauda 1957
- Cigogne blanche nidificatrice dans la région de Toulouse Alauda 1957
- Reproduction des hirondelles en 1957 Alauda 1957
- Observations aux îles Chausey Alauda 1963
- Destruction curieuse d’une nichée de hulotte Alauda 1963
- Le harle bièvre Mergus merganser sur le lac de Genève Alauda 1968
- Mésange à moustaches Panurus biarmicus en Brière Alauda 1969
- Nidification de la barge à queue noire et présence d’aigrettes garzettes en baie d’Audierne Alauda 1969
- Tourterelle turque à Beg-Meil en 1967 Alauda 1969
- Nidification possible de la barge à queue noire et présence d’aigrettes garzettes en baie d’Audierne Alauda1969
- Aigrette garzette sur le lac de Genève Alauda 1969
- Hivernage d’avocettes dans la région de Saint-Nazaire Alauda 1969
- Reproduction de la bécassine des marais Capella gallinago et migration des bondrées Pernis apivorus aux marais de Saint-Gond Alauda 1973
- Contribution de l’oologie à la connaissance de la biologie du coucou-gai Clamator glandarius Alauda 1973
- Mode de dépouillement de mammifères moyens par deux rapaces Alauda 1978
- Comportement particulier d’une mésange nonette Parus palustris Alauda 1978
- Observations sur l’île de Beniguet, archipel de Molène Alauda 1978
- Examen microscopique de la surface des coquilles d’œufs d’oiseaux Alauda 1982
- Mimétisme des œufs de coucou gris Cuculus canorus Alauda 1993
- Le comportement parasitaire du coucou gris Cuculus canorus : comparaisons régionales, évolutions dans le temps Alauda 1997

== Bibliography ==
- Jacques Perrin de Brichambaut
